= Dushanbe =

Capital and largest city of Tajikistan

Dushanbe Душанбe (Tajik)
- Capital city
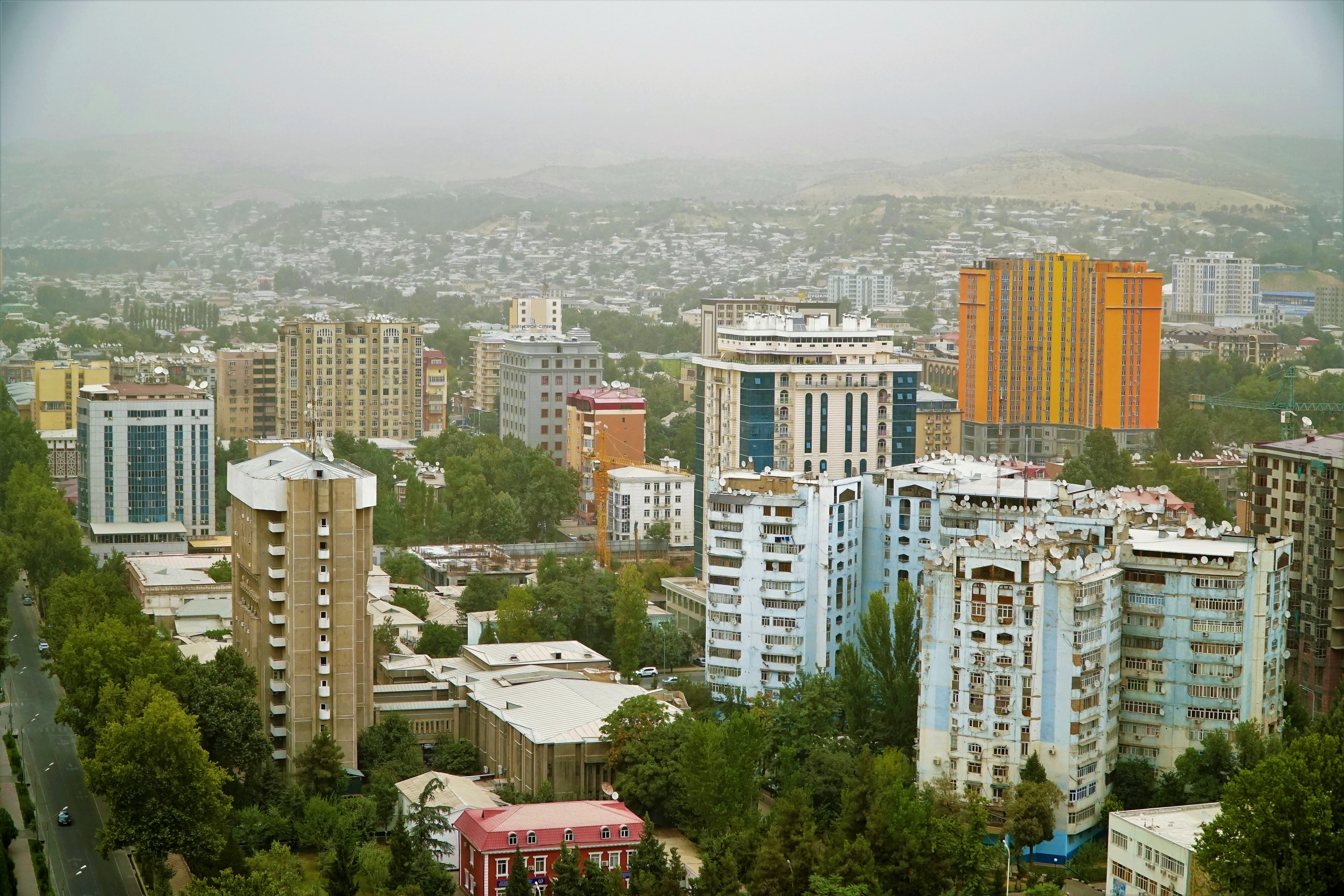
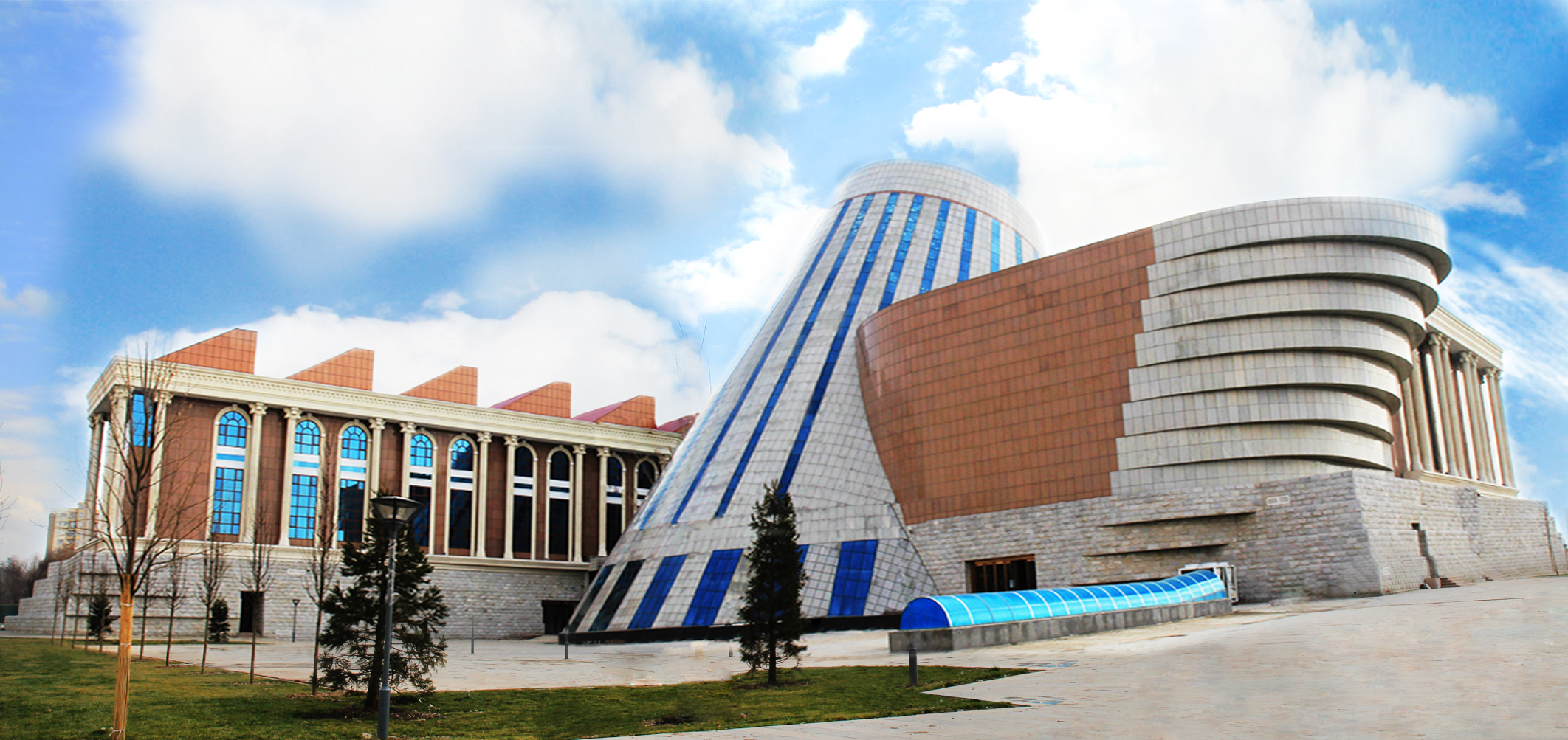
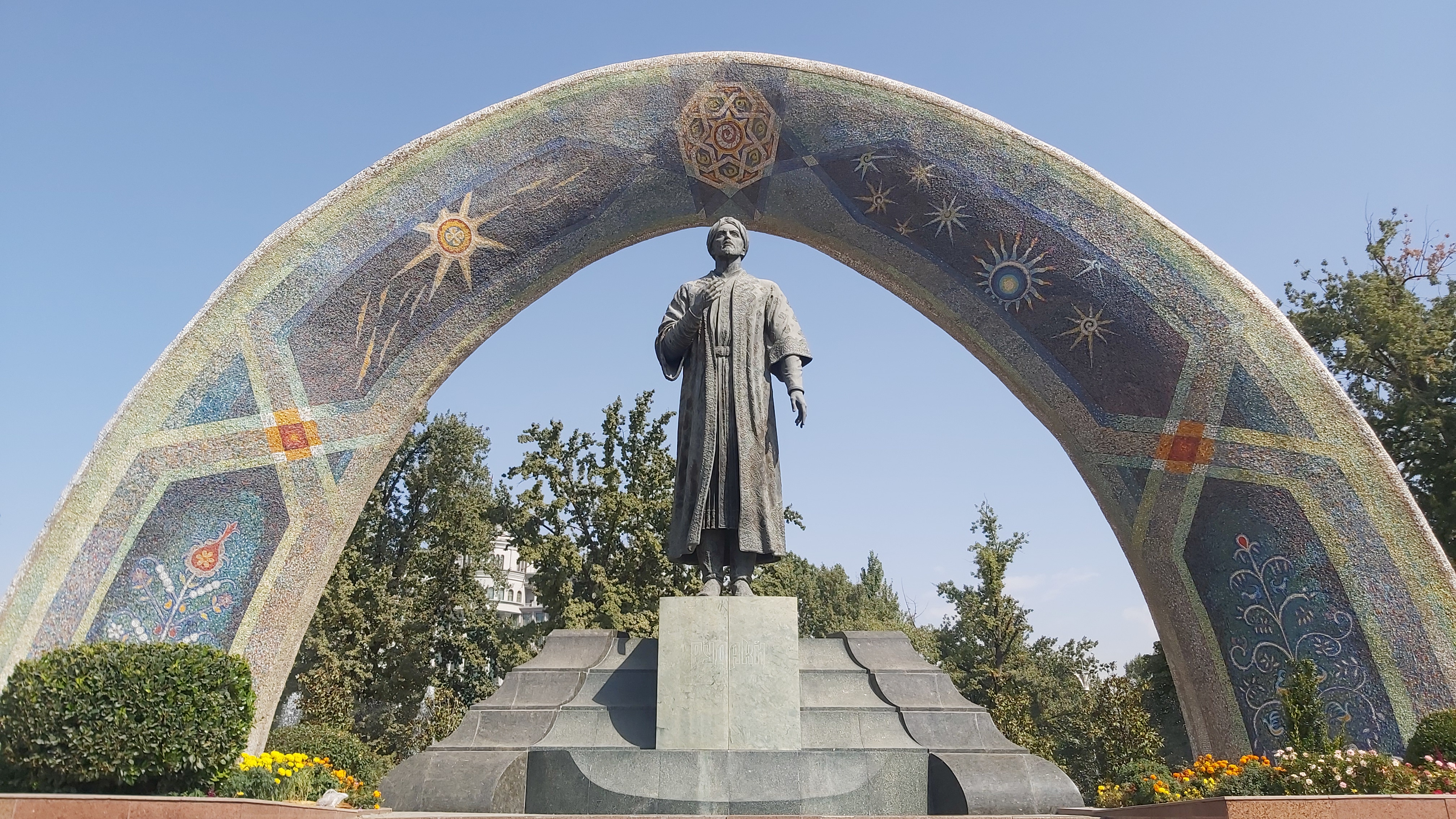
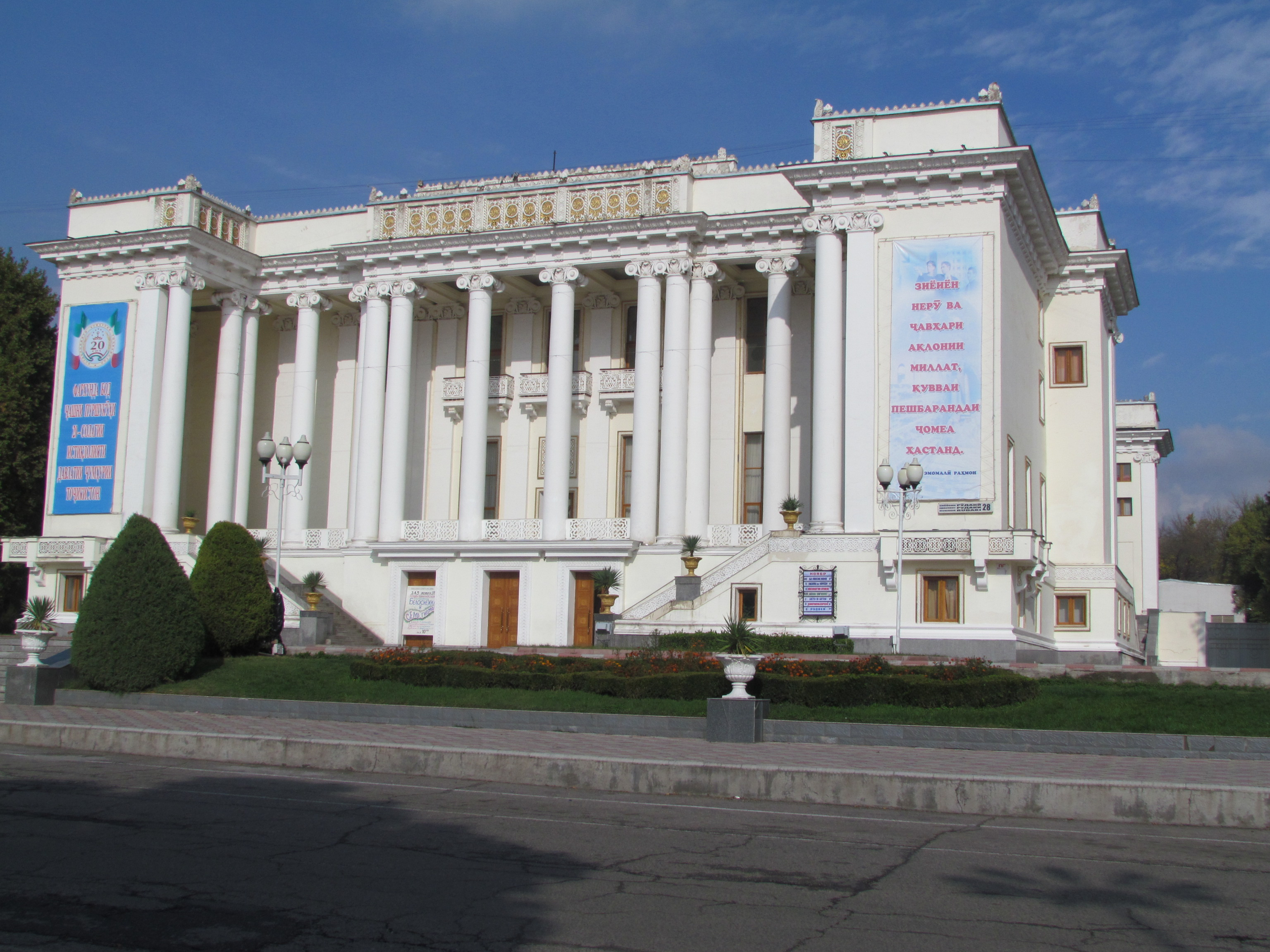
- Dushanbe skyline Tajikistan National Museum Rudaki Park National Library of Tajikistan Ayni Opera House Palace of the Nation and Dushanbe Flagpole

- Seal

- Location of Dushanbe in Tajikistan

- Location within Tajikistan Location within Asia
- Coordinates: 38°32′12″N 68°46′48″E
- Country: Tajikistan
- Region: Dushanbe
- Named for: Monday

Government
  - Shahrdar (Mayor): Rustam Emomali (PDPT)

Area
  - Land: 203 km^{2} (78 sq mi)
  - Urban: 185 km^{2} (71 sq mi)
- Elevation: 823 m (2,700 ft)
- Highest elevation: 930 m (3,050 ft)
- Lowest elevation: 750 m (2,460 ft)

Population (March 2024)
  - Capital city: 1,228,400
  - Rank: 1st in Tajikistan
  - Density: 7,700/km^{2} (20,000/sq mi)
  - Metro: 3,147,000
- Time zone: UTC+05:00 (TJT)
- Postal code: 6-Digit
- Area code: 372
- Vehicle registration: 01, 05
- HDI (2023): 0.758 high
- Official languages: Tajik (State); Russian (Interethnic)
- Website: www.dushanbe.tj

Dushanbe (Note: Tajik: Душанбе, Tajik pronunciation: [duʃæmˈbe]; Russian: Душанбе IPA: [dʊʂɐnˈbɛ]) (Note: Literally 'Monday'.) is the capital and largest city of Tajikistan. As of February 2023, Dushanbe had a population of 1,228,400, with this population being largely Tajik. Until 1929, the city was known in Russian as Dyushambe, (Note: Russian: Дюшамбе [dʲʊʂɐmˈbɛ]) and from 1929 to 1961 as Stalinabad, (Note: Tajik: Сталинобод, romanized: Stalinobod, pronounced [(ɪ)stɐlinɔˈbɔd]; Russian: Сталинабад [stəlʲɪnɐˈbat]) after Joseph Stalin. Dushanbe is located in the Hisar Valley, bounded by the Hisar Range in the north and east and the Babatag, Aktau, Rangontau and Karatau mountains in the south, and has an elevation of 750–930 m. The city is divided into four districts: Ismail Samani, Avicenna, Ferdowsi, and Shah Mansur.

In ancient times, what is now or is close to modern Dushanbe was settled by various empires and peoples, including Mousterian tool-users, various neolithic cultures, the Achaemenid Empire, Greco-Bactria, the Kushan Empire, and Hephthalites. In the Middle Ages, more settlements began near modern-day Dushanbe such as Hulbuk and its famous palace. From the 17th to early 20th century, Dushanbe grew into a market district controlled at times by the Beg of Hisor, Balkh, and finally Bukhara, before being conquered by the Russian Empire. Dushanbe was captured by the Bolsheviks in 1922, and the town was made the capital of the Tajik Autonomous Soviet Socialist Republic in 1924, which commenced Dushanbe's development and rapid population growth that continued until the Tajik Civil War. After the war, the city became capital of an independent Tajikistan and continued its growth and development into a modern city, today home to many international conferences.

Much of Dushanbe's education system dates from Soviet times and has a legacy of state control; today the largest university in Dushanbe, the Tajik National University, is funded by the government. Dushanbe International Airport is the primary airport serving the city. Other forms of transport include the trolleybus system dating from 1955, the small rail system, and the roads that traverse the city. Dushanbe's electricity is primarily hydroelectric, produced by the Nurek Dam, and the aging water system dates from 1932. Tajikistan's healthcare system is concentrated in Dushanbe, meaning that the major hospitals of the country are in the city. The city makes up 20% of Tajikistan's GDP and has large industrial, financial, retail, and tourism sectors. Parks and main sights of the city include Victory Park, Rudaki Park, the Tajikistan National Museum, the Dushanbe Flagpole, and the Tajikistan National Museum of Antiquities.

== Etymology ==
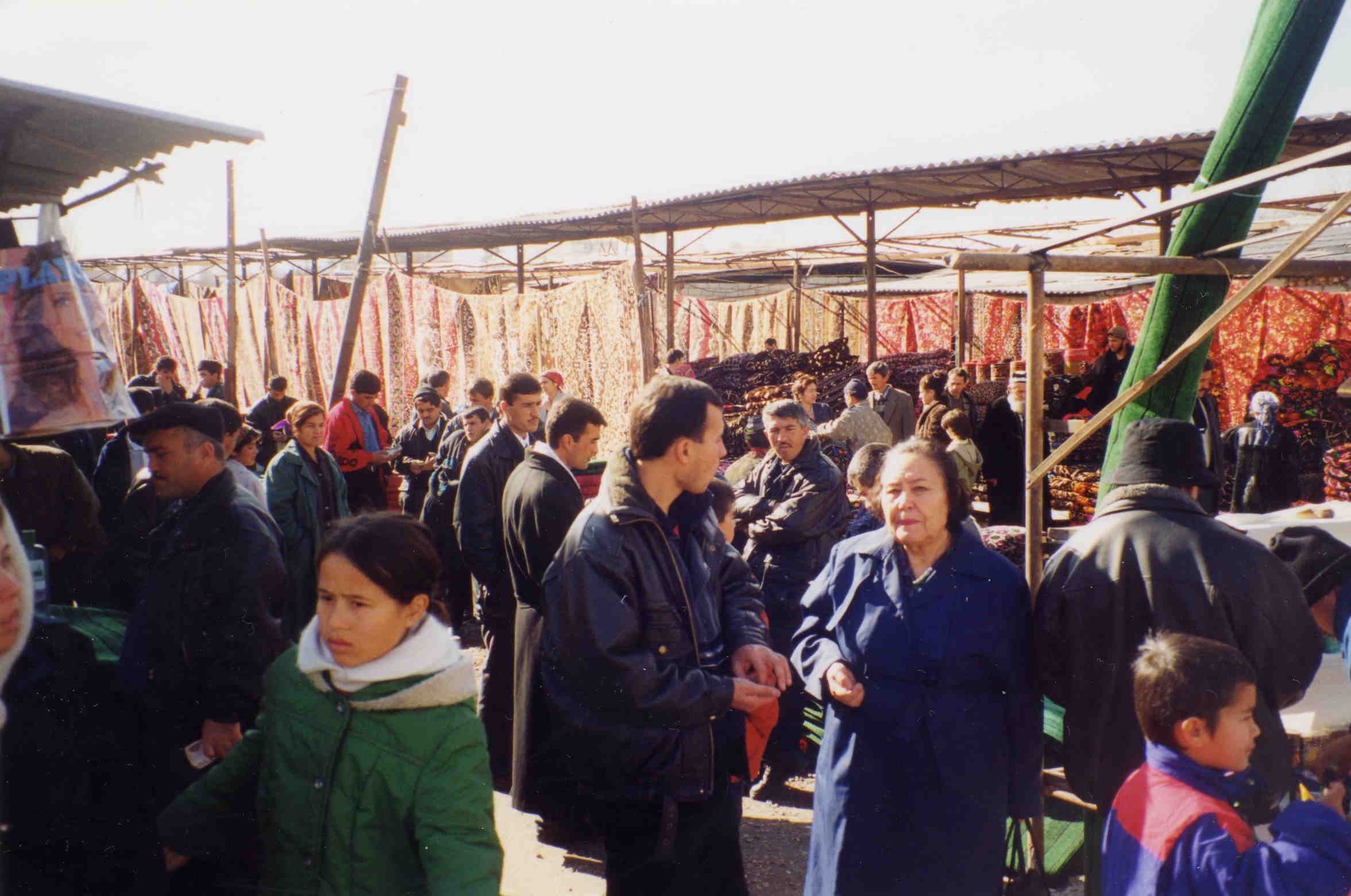
Bazaar in Dushanbe, 2007

Dushanbe was the location of a large bazaar that operated every Monday (in Tajiki Persian: Душанбе old sc. دوشنبه lit. 'the second day [دو du] following Saturday [شنبه shanbe]') named simply Душанбе Бозор Dushanbe-Bazar (o. s. دوشنبه بازار) In late 1929, the city was renamed Stalinabad (the city of Stalin), but was reverted late 1961 as a result of de-Stalinization.

== History ==
=== Ancient times ===
In the Stone Age, Mousterian tool-users inhabited the Hisar Valley near modern-day Dushanbe. The Hisar culture, whose stone tools were discovered within modern-day Dushanbe at the confluence of the Varzob and Luchob, Bishkent culture, and Vakhsh culture all were thought to have inhabited the valley in the second millennium BC, during the Neolithic period, and were primarily involved in cattle breeding, agriculture, and weaving.

Near Dushanbe International Airport, Bronze Age burials were discovered dating from the end of the second to the beginning of the first millennium BC. Achaemenid dishes and ceramics were found 6 kilometres (3.7 mi) east of Dushanbe in Qiblai, as the city was controlled by the Achaemenids from the sixth century BC. Archaeological remnants of a small citadel dating to the fifth century BC have been discovered 40 kilometres (25 mi) south and wedge-shaped copper axes have been discovered from the second century BC.

The Seleucids conquered the region in 312 BC. A small Greco-Bactrian settlement of about 40 hectares (99 acres) was dated to the end of the third century BC. The oldest coin found in the city is a Greco-Bactrian coin depicting Eucratides (r. 171–145 BC) and another was found depicting Dionysus. There was also a Kushan city on the left bank of the Varzob river from the 2nd century BC to 3rd century AD containing burial sites from the time period. The Kushans created other settlements such as Garavkala, Tepai Shah, Shakhrinau, and Uzbekontepa. The Sasanian Empire invaded Sogdiana in the fifth century, possibly giving coins as tribute to the Kidarites which ended up on the site of today's city.

The ruins of a Buddhist monastery of the Hephthalite period of the late fifth to sixth century, now referred to as Ajina Tepe, lie in the Vakhsh valley near Dushanbe. Other settlements from the Tokharistan period have also been discovered, like the town of Shishikona that was destroyed during the Soviet era and depopulated during the Mongol invasion. International trade picked up during this period in the region. A castle was also discovered dating from the time period. In 582, the Western Turkic Khaganate gained control over the region. In the seventh century, a Chinese pilgrim visited the region and mentioned the city of Shuman, possibly on the site of modern Dushanbe.

After the Arab conquest, the Samanids controlled the region, which was involved in crafts and trade, and in the 10th-12th centuries the medieval city of Hulbuk developed near Dushanbe, which notably contained the palace of the governor of Khulbuk, "an artistic treasure of the Tajik people", among other smaller medieval settlements like Shishikhona. The Kharakhanids minted coins from 1018 to 1019 found in the city. The city came under the influence of the Ghurids from the 12th to 13th centuries.

Other smaller settlements were founded during the Late Middle Ages after the Mongol invasion, such as Abdullaevsky and Shainak. Timur conquered the region during this time period and various other empires controlled the city. The city's economy started to rely more heavily on crafts and trade.

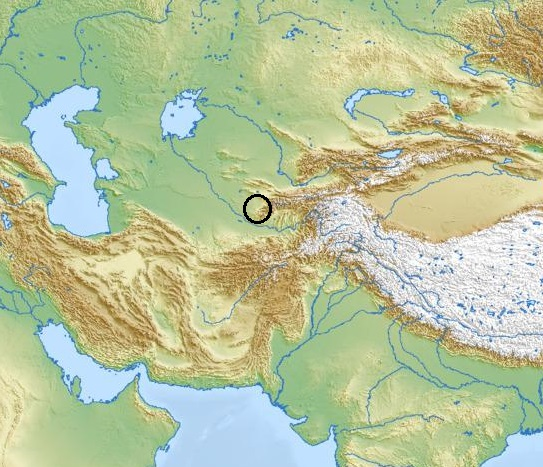
Bishkent culture

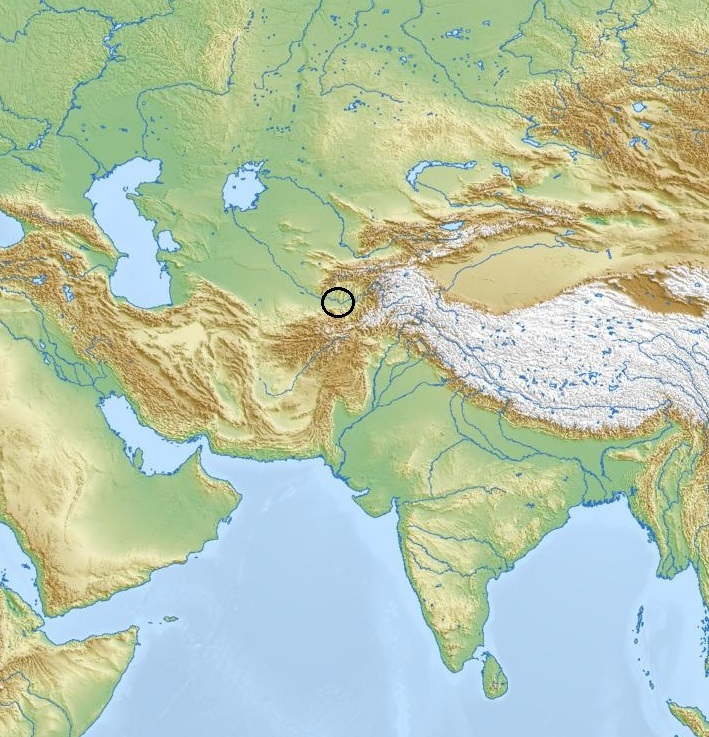
Vakhsh culture

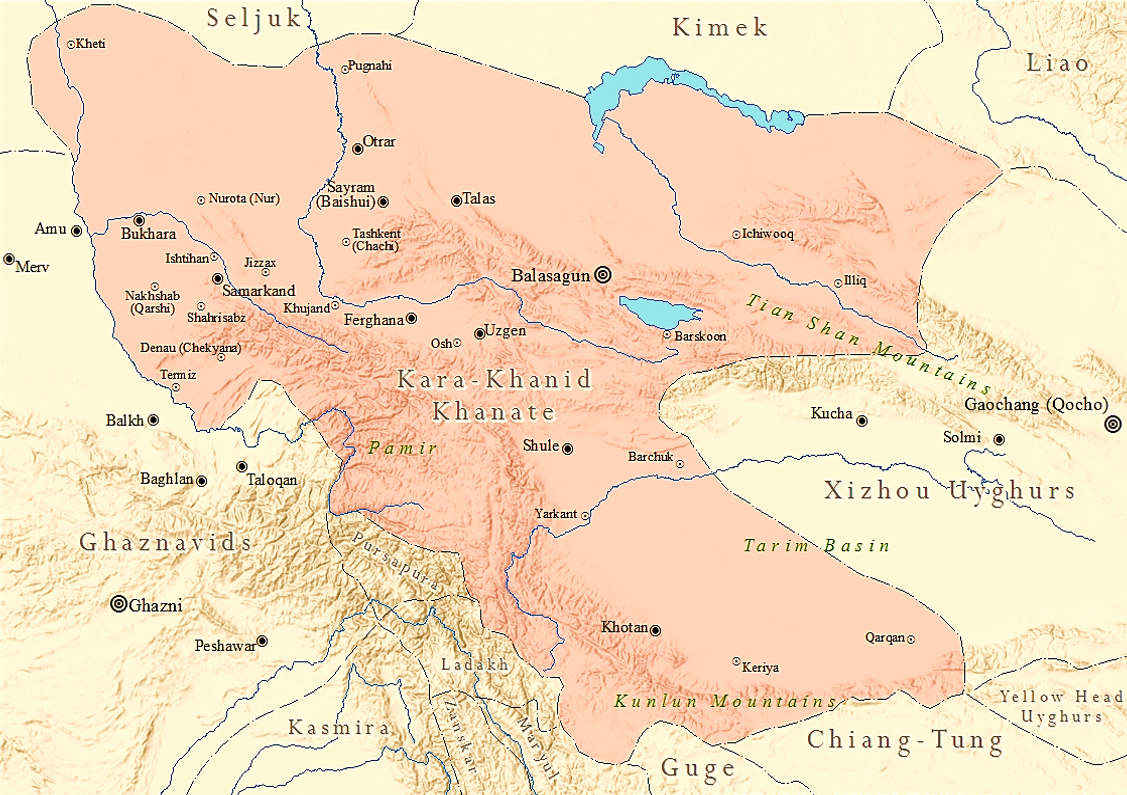
Kara-Khanid Khanate

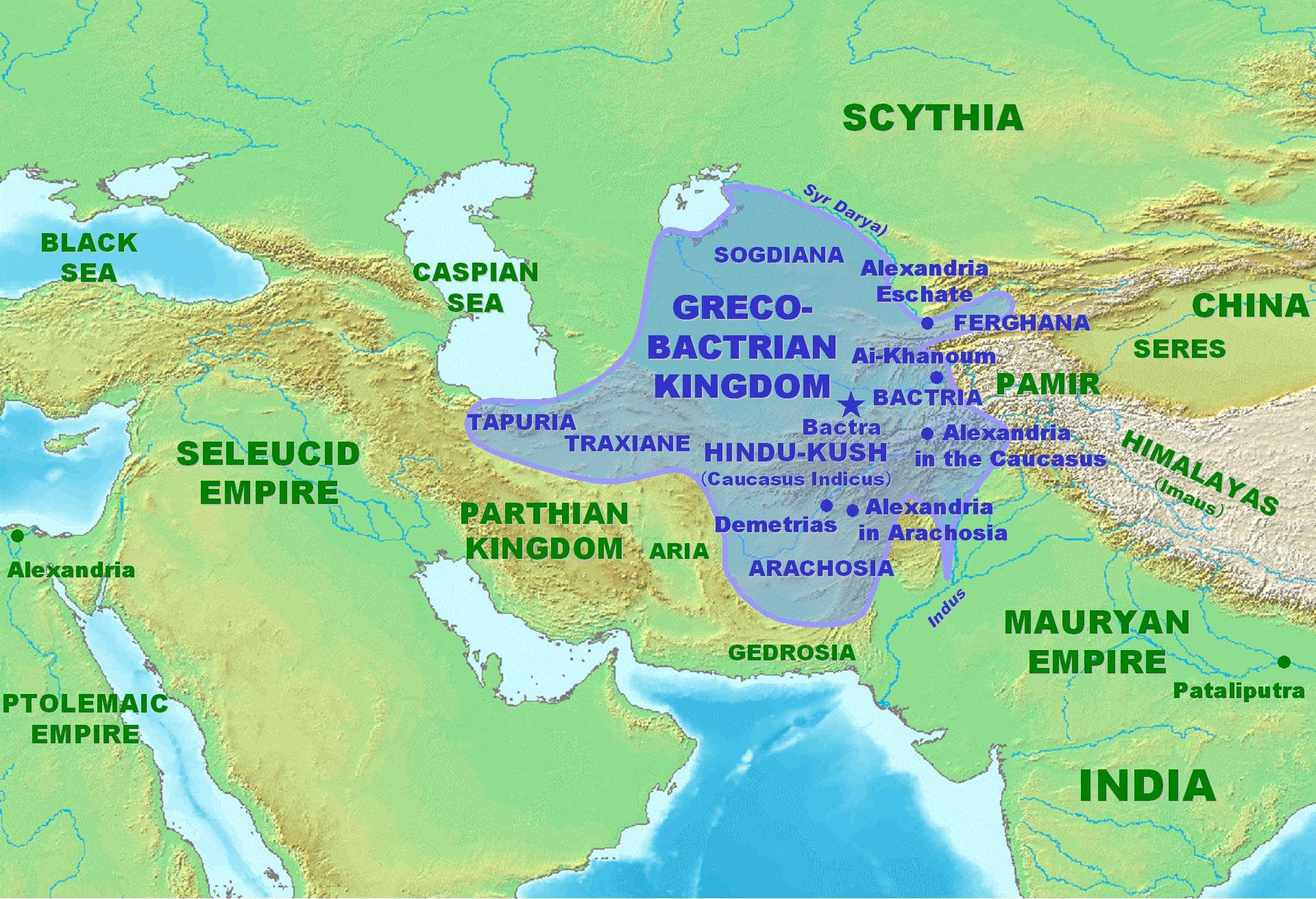
Greco-Bactria

=== Market town ===
The first time Dushanbe appeared in the historical record was in 1676, in a letter sent from the Balkh khan Subhonquli Bahodur to Fyodor III, the Tsar of Russia. However, the Balkh historian Mahmud ibn Wali mentioned the area in the 1630s in the book Sea of Secrets Regarding the Values of the Noble. At first, the town was called "Kasabai Dushanbe" (Persian: قصبه دوشنبه қасабаи Душанбе), when it was under the control of Balkh. This name reflected both Dushanbe's status as a town, with Kasaba meaning town, and the influence of trade, as the name Dushanbe, which means Monday in Persian, was due to the large bazaar in the district that operated on Mondays. Dushanbe's location between the caravan routes heading east–west from the Hisar Valley through Karategin to the Alay Valley, and north–south to the Kafirnigan River and then to Vakhsh Valley and Afghanistan through the Anzob Pass from the Fergana and Zeravshan valleys that ultimately led traders to Bukhara, Samarkand, the Pamirs, and Afghanistan incentivized the development of its market. At the time, the town had a population of around 7,000–8,000 with around 500–600 households.

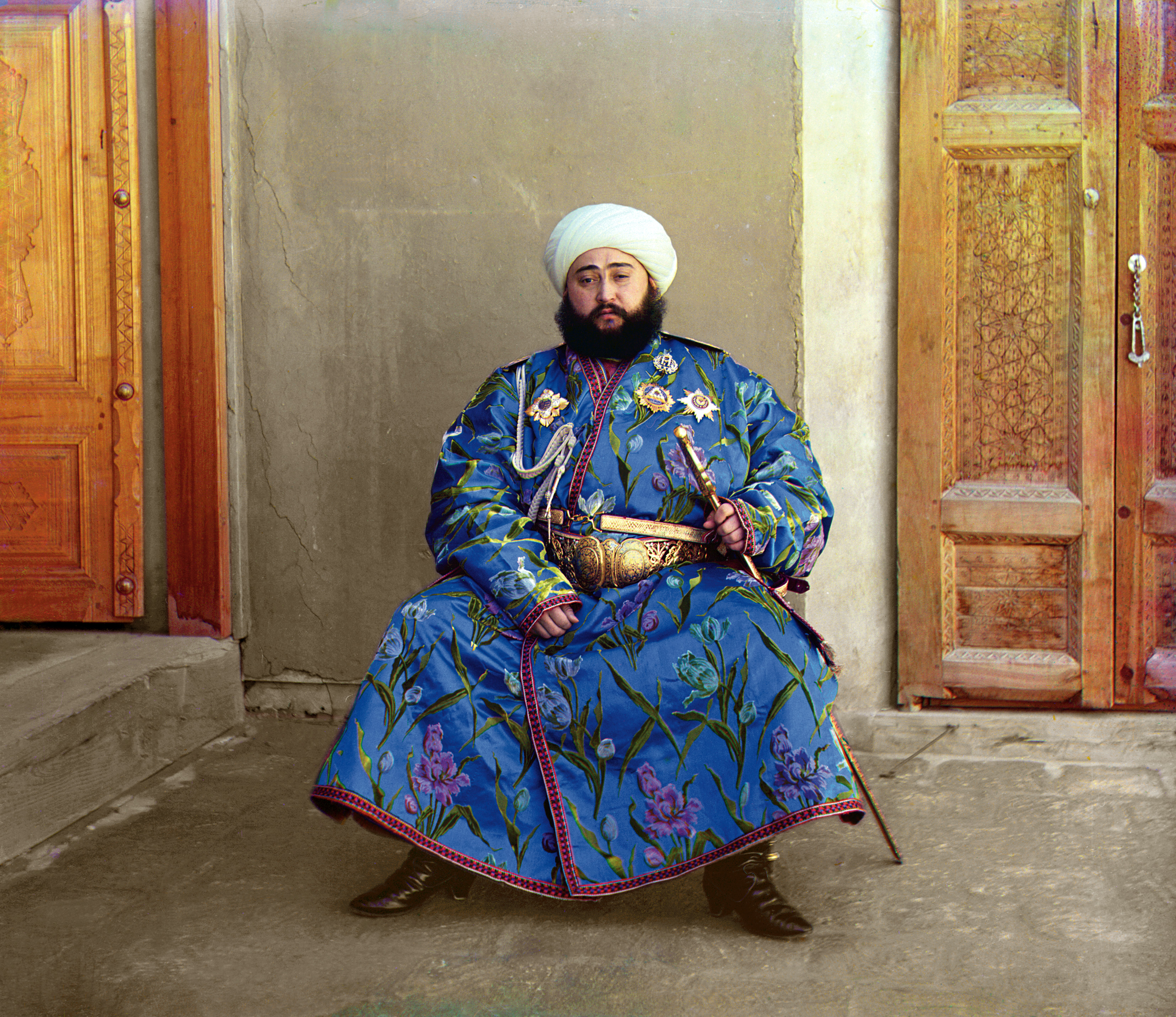
1911 color photograph of the last Emir of Bukhara, Alim Khan

By 1826, the town was called Dushanbe Qurghan (Tajik: Душанбе Қурғон, Dushanbe Qurghon, with the suffix qurƣon from Turkic qurğan, meaning "fortress"). It was first Russified as Dyushambe (Дюшамбе) in 1875. It had a caravanserai, a stopping point for travelers to Samarkand, Khujand, Kulob and the Pamirs. It boasted 14 mosques with maktabs, 2 madrassas, and 14 teahouses at the turn of the 19th century. At that time, the town was a citadel on a steep bank on the left bank of the Varzob River with 10,000 residents. It was a center for weaving, tanning, and iron smelting production in the region. Various states, including Hisor, exercised control over the city during the 18th and early 19th century despite Bukharan claims of sovereignty. In 1868, the Tsarist government established suzerainty over Bukhara. In the unstable environment of Russian intervention and local revolts, Bukhara took over the Dushanbe region, control over which the Emirate was able to sustain through the gradual establishment of a Russian-influenced centralized state. The first hospital in the district was constructed in 1915 by Russian investment and an early railroad was proposed to connect the market town with the Russian railway system in 1909, but was abandoned after a review determined the venture would not be profitable, although the town did have a functioning railroad to Kagan.

In 1920, the last Emir of Bukhara briefly took refuge in Dushanbe after being overthrown by the Bolshevik revolution. After the Red Army conquered the area the next year, he fled to Afghanistan on 4 March 1921. In February 1922, the town was taken by Basmachi troops led by Enver Pasha after a siege, but on 14 July 1922 again came under the power of the Bolsheviks soon before the death of Enver Pasha on 4 August 1922 outside of Dushanbe. It was a part of the Bukharan PSR until the formation of the Tajik ASSR.

==== Capital of the Tajik ASSR ====
National delimitation of Central Asia; the Tajik ASSR is in light purple

Dushanbe was proclaimed the capital of the Tajik Autonomous Soviet Socialist Republic as a part of the Uzbek Soviet Socialist Republic in October 1924, and the government started to function formally on 15 March 1925.

Dushanbe was chosen instead of larger-populated districts in Tajikistan because of its role as a crossroads of Tajikistan for its large market served as a meeting place for much of Tajikistan's population. Along with its market, there was a lively livestock trade as well as trade in fabrics, leather, tin products, and weapons. The mild Mediterranean climate was another reason Soviet authorities chose the city as the capital.

Before the Emir's relocation to the city, Dushanbe had the only Jewish population in Eastern Bukhara (of about 600) whom were involved in trade and tailoring. When the Emir moved to the city in 1920, however, the Jewish population's property was plundered and the Jews were relocated to Hisor. They were only let back into Dushanbe with its conquest by the Red Army, and in the 1920s and 1930s their population gradually increased with Bukharan immigrants. Dushanbe was also officially recognized as the capital of the Emirate of Bukhara during its waning days as it served as the last refuge of the last Emir of Bukhara during its conquest by the Soviet Union, possibly another motivating factor for the decision to establish the new ASSR's capital in the district. The population during Soviet conquest and Basmachi revolts declined from an already meager 3,140 in 1920 to only 283 in 1924 with only 40 houses still standing. To aid in the recovery, the Soviet authorities temporarily exempted much of the population from having to pay taxes. In 1923, the Soviets created Dushanbe's first telegraph link to Bukhara, initiated its first railroad to Termez, and set up a telephone switchboard in 1924. On 12 August 1924, the first newspaper of the town, Voice of the East (Russian: Овози Шарк), was published in Arabic and soon after a Russian-language paper, Red Tajikistan (Russian: Красный Таджикистан), began publication. Power plants and electricity were introduced to Dushanbe during this time. By the end of 1924, the first regular plane routes from Dushanbe came into operation, with one connection to Bukhara and later one to Tashkent. The post office was also set up that year. Construction on the railroad commenced on 24 June 1926, and it was completed in November 1929, connecting Dushanbe with the Trans-Caspian railroad and kickstarting economic growth. In 1925, the first boy's boarding school was constructed in the capital. On 1 September 1927, the first pedagogical college opened in Dushanbe and in November the motor road from Dushanbe to Kulob was completed. Tajiks from the countryside were given assistance and free land plots in the capital to increase its population and development.

=== Capital of the Tajik SSR ===
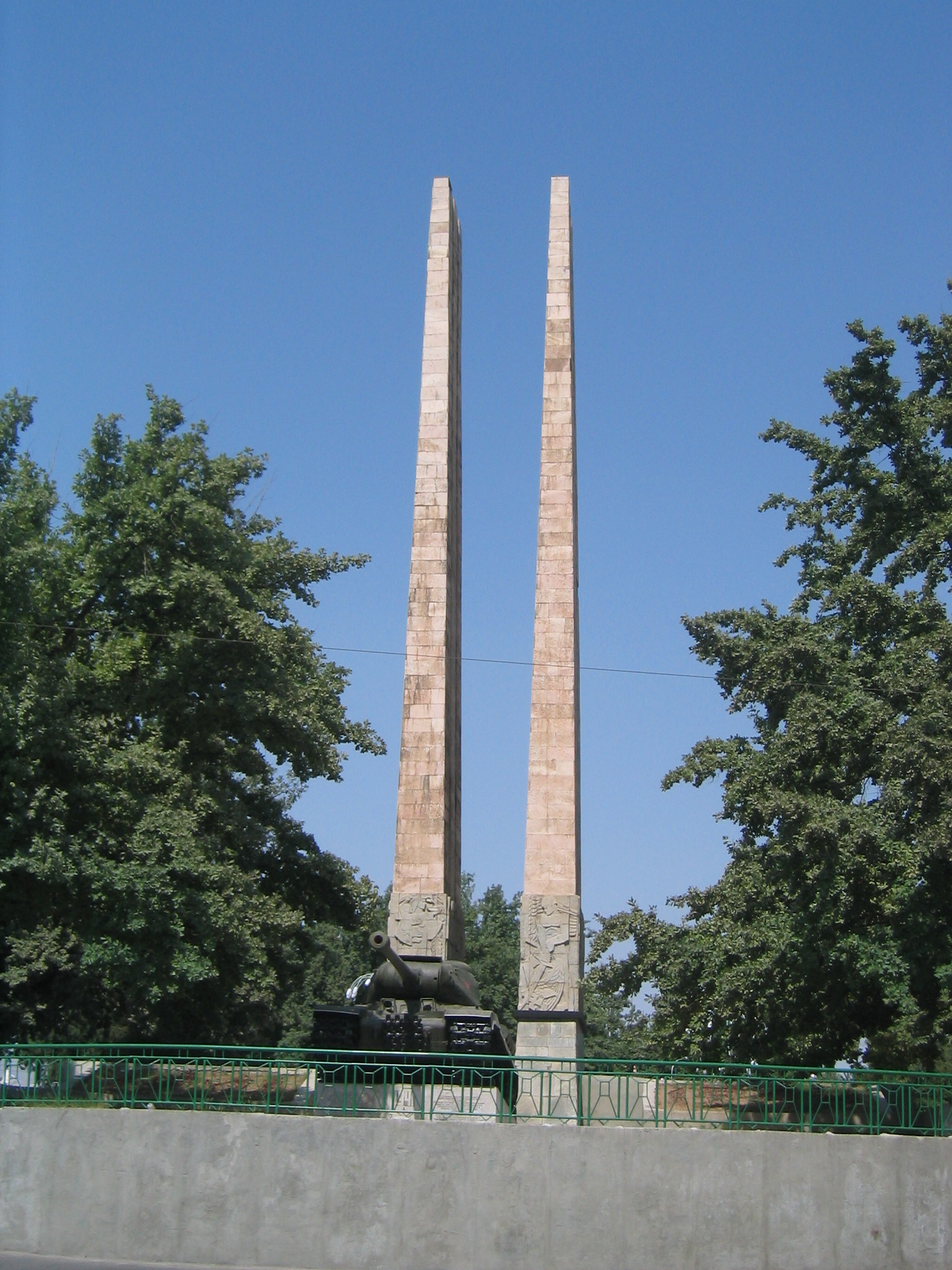
Dushanbe World War II monument

The Tajik Soviet Socialist Republic, previously the Tajik ASSR, separated from the Uzbek SSR in 1929, and its capital Dyushambe was renamed Stalinabad (Russian: Сталинабад; Tajik: Сталинобод Stalinobod) for Joseph Stalin on 19 October 1929, incorporating the nearby districts of Shohmansur, Mavlono, and Sari Osiyo.

In the years that followed, the city developed at a rapid pace. The Soviets transformed the area into a center for cotton and silk production, and tens of thousands of people relocated to the city. The population also increased with thousands of ethnic Tajiks migrating to Tajikistan from Uzbekistan following the transfer of Bukhara and Samarkand to the Uzbek SSR as part of national delimitation in Central Asia. Industry during the time period was limited, focused on local production, although it had expanded by nine times since 1913 by 1940. The first bus line began operating in 1930 and in 1938, Komsomol members constructed Komsomolskoye Lake in the city.

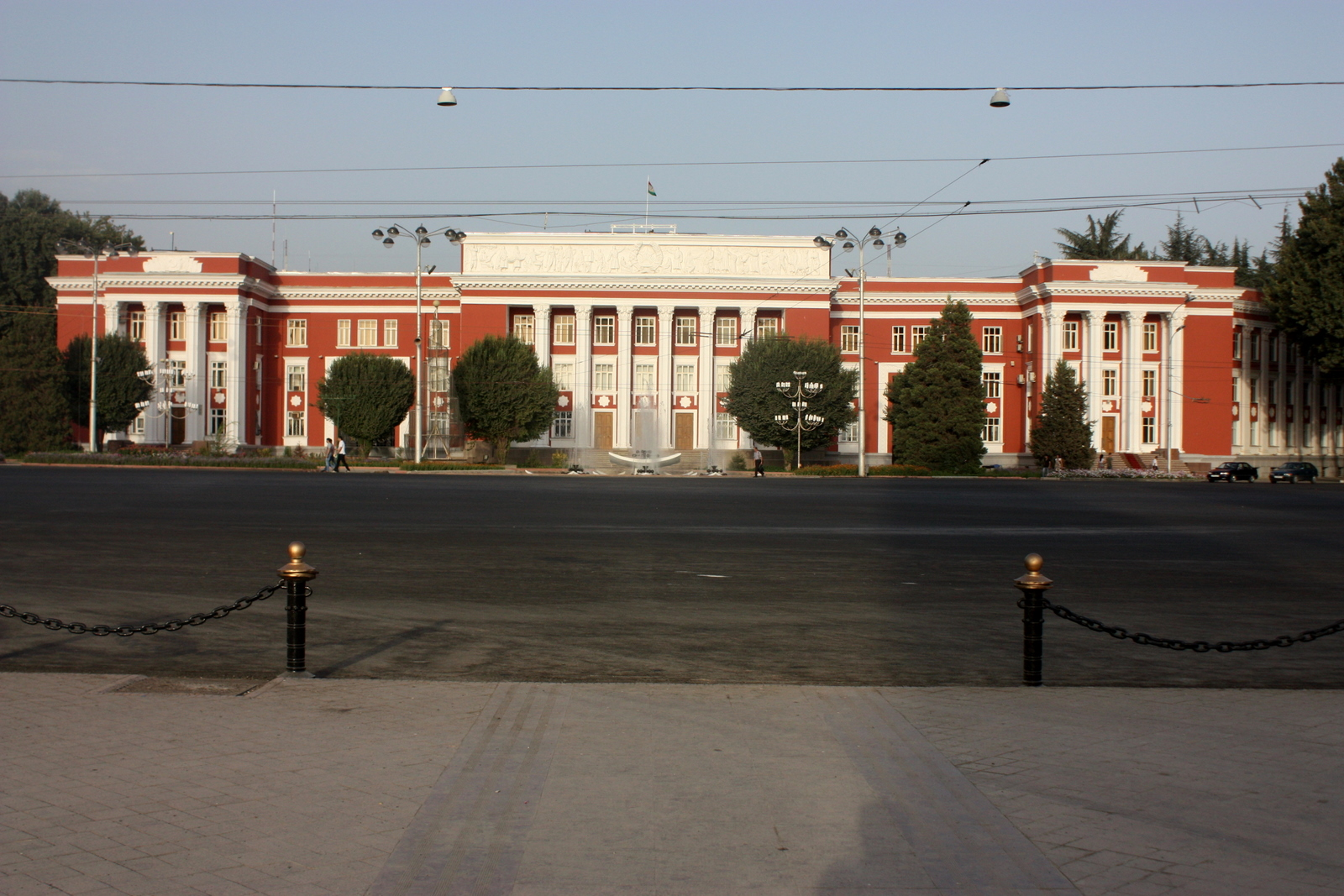
Former Supreme Soviet Building

Former Central Committee Building, demolished in 2021

Many of these projects occurred under the 1925–1932 mayoralty of Abdukarim Rozykov, one of the first mayors of Dushanbe, who sought to transform it into a "model communist city" through modernization and urban planning. Mikhail Kalitin continued the industrial development of Dushanbe, building the Komsomolskoye Lake and promoting industry in the city. Towards the end of this period, in the late 1930s, there were 4,295 buildings in Dushanbe.

During World War 2, the population of Dushanbe and Tajikistan swelled with 100,000 evacuees from the Eastern Front that led to the deployment of 17 hospitals in the city. The city's industry also greatly increased during the war, as the Soviets wanted to move critical infrastructure far behind enemy lines, and industries like textile manufacturing and food processing grew. In 1954, there were 30 schools in the city; a medical institute named after Avicenna; the Stalinabad Academy of Sciences; the University of Stalinabad, which was founded in 1947 and had 1,500 students; and the Stalinabad Pedagogical Institute for Woman, established on 1 September 1953. In 1960, gas supply reached the capital through a gas pipeline opened from Kyzyl to Tumxuk to Dushanbe. On 10 November 1961, as part of de-Stalinization, Stalinabad was renamed back to Dushanbe, the name it retains to this day. In 1960, under the leadership of Mahmudbek Narzibekov, the first zoo was built in the city. Later in the decade the mayor developed a plan to end the housing shortage and provide free apartments.

The Nurek Dam, which was the tallest dam in the world at the time, was completed 90 kilometres (56 mi) south east of Dushanbe during the 1960s. The Rogun Dam, upstream from Nurek Dam, was started in that period as well. They were both megaprojects meant to showcase Soviet innovation and development in Tajikistan. However, while the Nurek Dam was completed, the Rogun Dam was cancelled in the 1970s because of stagnating Soviet economic growth. On 2 August 1979, the population of Dushanbe reached 500,000, and it had the highest population growth rate in the Soviet Union.

==== Riots and unrest ====
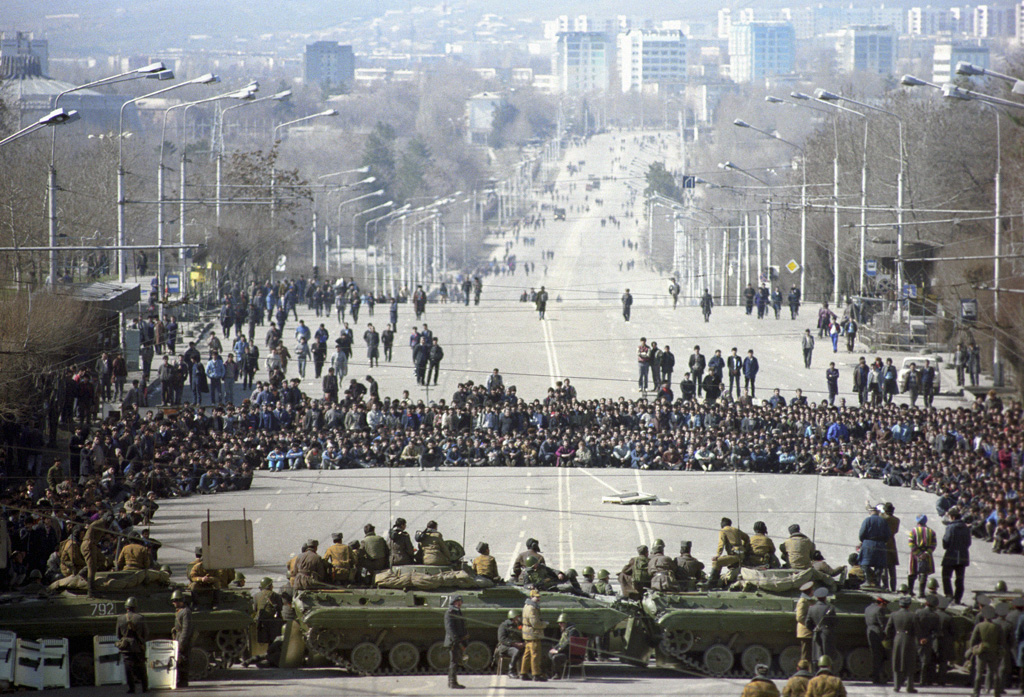
February 1990 Riots in Dushanbe

In the 1980s, environmental problems and crime began to increase. Mass violence, hooliganism, binge drinking, and violent assaults became more common. There was an attack on foreign students at the Agricultural Institute in 1987 and a riot in the Pedagogical Institute two years later. Increasing regionalism also destabilized the SSR.

On 10–11 February 1990, 300 demonstrators gathered at the Communist Party Central Committee building after it was rumored that the Soviet government planned to relocate tens of thousands of Armenian refugees to Tajikistan. In reality, only 29 Armenians went to Dushanbe and were housed by their family members. However, the crowd kept growing in size to 3-5 thousand people; soon after, violence broke out. Martial law was quickly declared and troops were sent in to protect ethnic minorities and defend against vandalism and looting. The number of people protesting increased significantly, however, and they attacked the Central Committee building. The 29 Armenians were quickly evacuated on an emergency flight after shots were fired.

A few days after, and with looting still occurring throughout the city, demonstrators created the Provisional People's Committee, or the Temporary Committee for Crisis Resolution, which put forward demands such as "the expulsion of Armenian refugees, the resignation of the government and the removal of the Communist Party, the closure of an aluminum smelter in western Tajikistan for environmental reasons, equitable distribution of profits from cotton production, and the release of 25 protesters taken into custody."

Many high-ranking officials resigned and the protector's goal of toppling the government was almost successful, but Soviet troops moved into the city, declared the demands illegal, and rejected the resignation of the high-ranking officials. 16-25 people were killed in the violence; many if not most were Russian.

The riots were largely fueled by concerns about housing shortages for the Tajik population, but they coincided with a wave of nationalist unrest that swept Transcaucasia and other Central Asian states during the twilight of Mikhail Gorbachev's rule.

After the increase of organized opposition from the Democratic Party of Tajikistan and Rastokhez, glasnost by Gorbachev, economic contraction, and increased opposition by regional elites, Qahhor Mahkamov disbanded the Communist Party of Tajikistan on 27 August 1991 and quit the party the next day. On 9 September 1991, Tajikistan's government declared independence from the Soviet Union.

=== Capital of Tajikistan ===
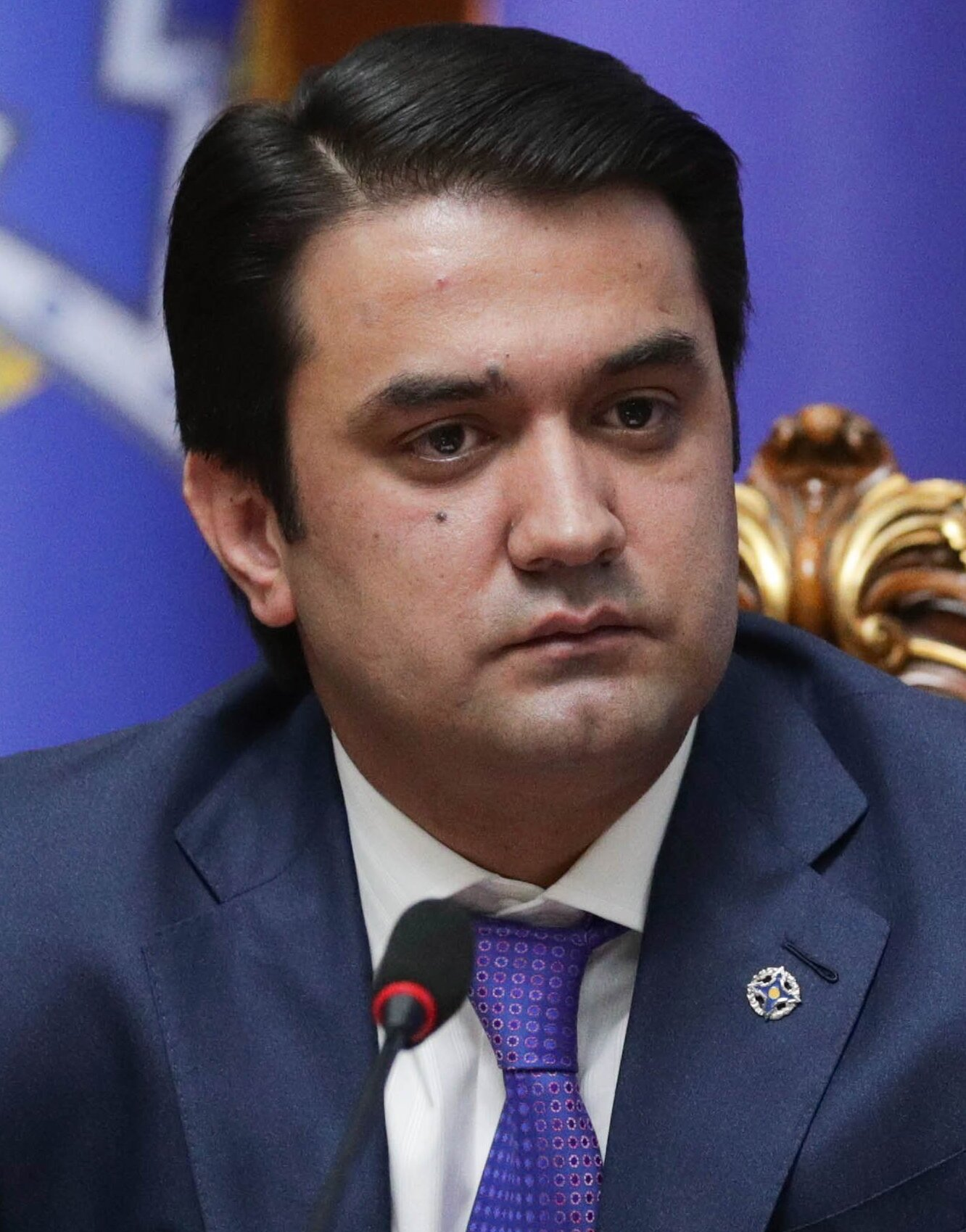
Rustam Emomali

Dushanbe became the capital of an independent Tajikistan on 9 September 1991. Iran, the United States, and Russia soon opened embassies in Dushanbe in early 1992.

Dushanbe was controlled by the Popular Front-supported government during most of the 1992–1997 Tajikistani Civil War, although the Islamist and Democratic United Tajik Opposition managed to capture the capital in 1992 until 8000 Russian-backed and Uzbekistani-backed government troops regained control of Dushanbe. Most of the Russian population fled the capital during the violence of this time period while large amounts of rural Tajiks moved in; by 1993, more than half of the Russian population had fled. The factions during the civil war were organized primarily upon regional lines. The war was ended by a 27 June 1997 armistice, administered by the UN, that guaranteed the opposition 30% of the positions in the government.

In 2000, Dushanbe received internet access for the first time. In 2004, the UNESCO declared Dushanbe as a city of peace. Mahmadsaid Ubaidulloev was declared mayor of Dushanbe in 1996, after during the civil war era many said he was in real control of the government. He was the mayor of the capital for the longest term of any mayor, 21 years, until 2017. From independence, the city's economy has grown consistently up until the COVID-19 recession. In January 2017, Rustam Emomali, current President Emomali Rahmon's son, was appointed Mayor of Dushanbe, a move which is seen by some analysts as a step to reaching the top of the government.

== Geography ==
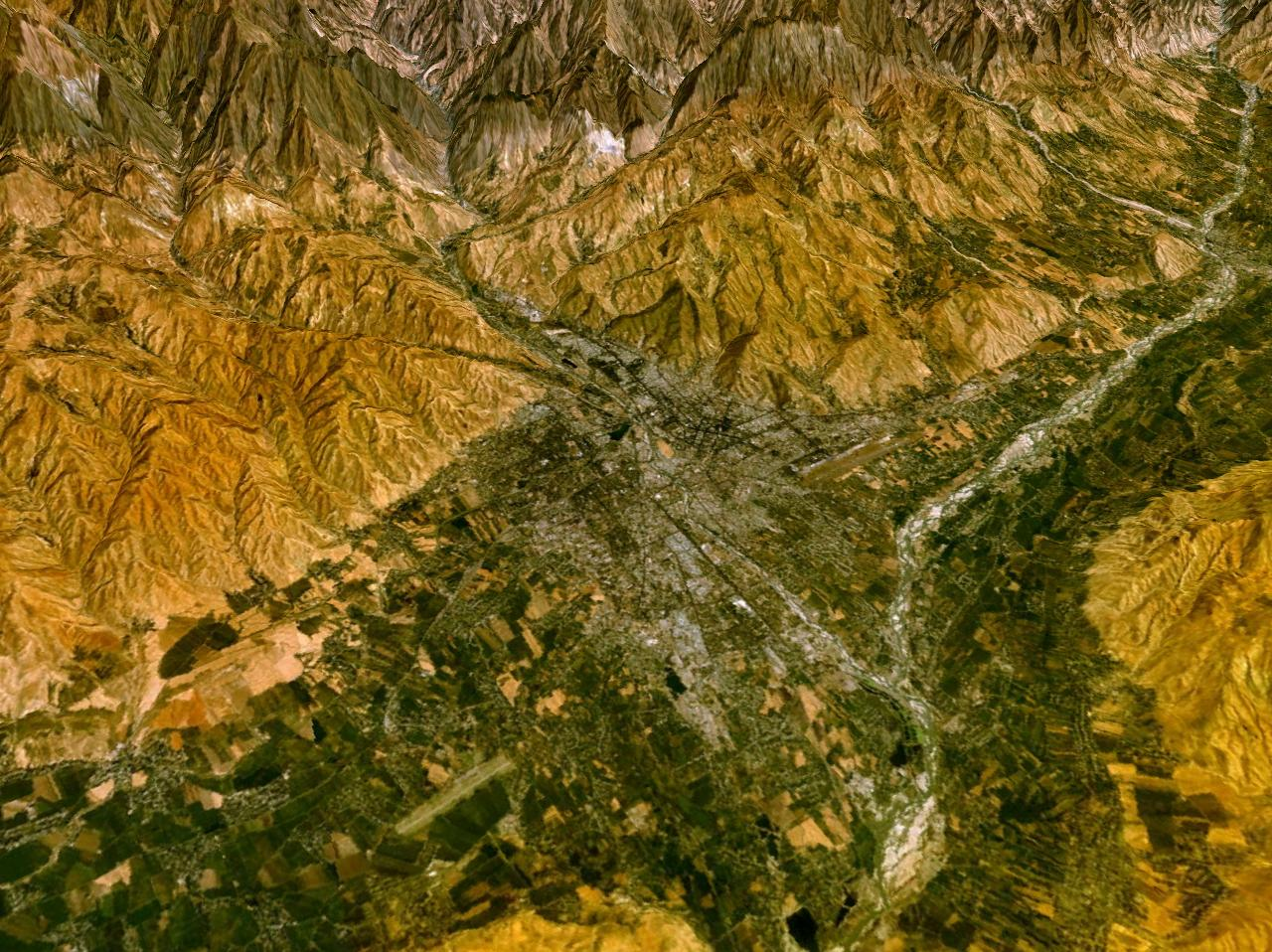
Dushanbe in the Hisar Valley

Dushanbe is situated at the confluence of two rivers, the Varzob (flowing from north to south) and the Kofarnihon. It is 750 metres (2,460 ft)–930 metres (3,050 ft) above sea level; in the south and west, the elevation is closer to 750 metres (2,460 ft)–800 metres (2,600 ft), while in the north and northeast it reaches 900 metres (3,000 ft)–950 metres (3,120 ft). The north and east of the city is bounded by the Hisar range, which can reach up to 4,000 metres (13,000 ft) above sea level, and is bounded on the south by the Babatag, Aktau, Rangontau and Karatau mountains which reach a height from 1,400 metres (4,600 ft)–1,700 metres (5,600 ft) above sea level; Dushanbe, therefore, is an intermontane basin located in the Hisar Valley. It has a primarily hilly terrain. 80% of Dushanbe's buildings are located within the valley, which has a width of approximately 18 kilometres (11 mi)–100 kilometres (62 mi). Before the 1960s, most of Dushanbe was located on the left bank of the Varzob river, but increased construction led to the city expanding across it.

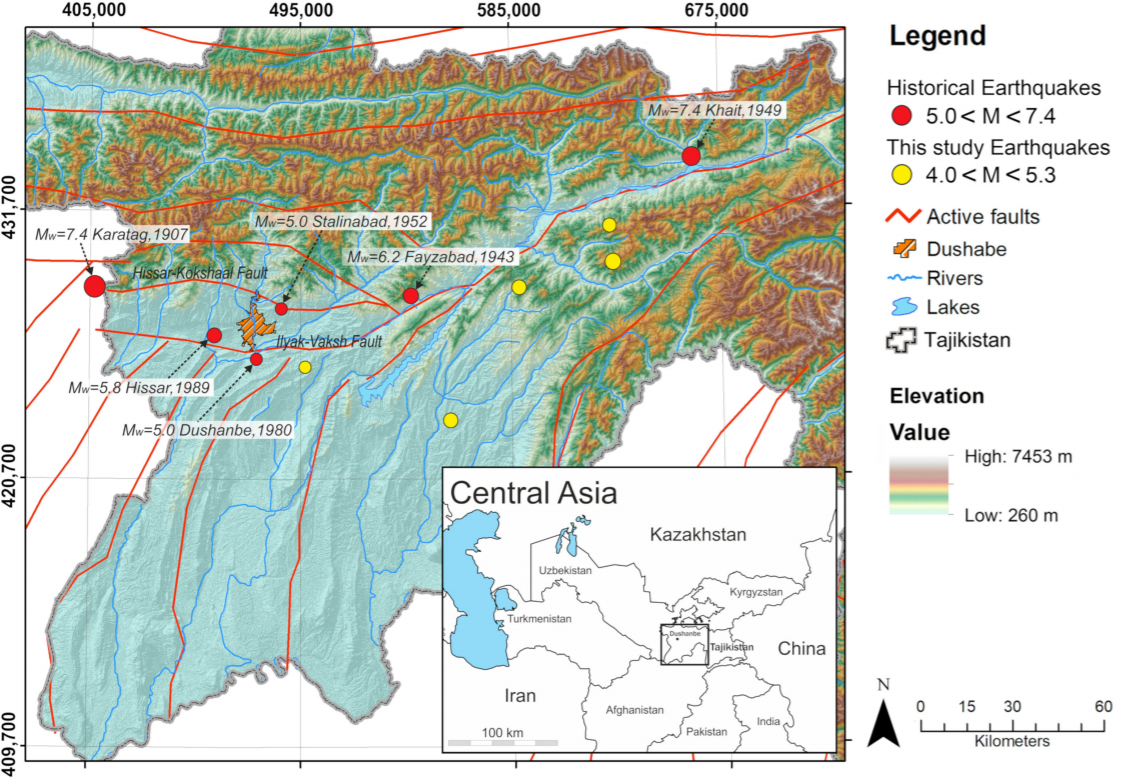
Seismic map of Dushanbe

Dushanbe is located in an area with high seismicity. The magnitude of potential earthquakes is thought to reach a maximum of 7.5-8. Over the past 100 years, many earthquakes from a 5-6 magnitude have been felt in the city, such as the 1949 Khait earthquake.

=== Climate ===
Dushanbe features a Mediterranean climate (Köppen: Csa), with some humid continental climate influences (Köppen: Dsa) due to the nearby glaciers and mountain range. The city features hot summers and chilly winters. The climate is damper than other Central Asian capitals, with an average annual rainfall over 500 millimetres (20 in) as moist air is funneled by the surrounding valley during the winter and spring. Winters are not as cold as north of the Hisar Range owing to the shielding of the city by mountains from extremely cold air from Siberia. Snow occurs on an average of 25 days a year and cloudy days make up an average of 24 a year. However, precipitation in winter typically falls as rain and not snow. The surrounding mountains prohibit strong winds from entering the city, although there are consistent mild breezes.

Winter in Dushanbe begins on 7 December and ends on 22 February; spring starts on 22 February and ends on 17 May. During springtime, cyclones and rain are at their highest along with thunderstorms and hail, which causes significant damage and occurs for around 3 days per year. Summer starts on 17 May and ends on 14 August, the best period for agriculture. Dry weather sets in during this, as evidenced by a sharp drop in precipitation during the summer. A warm and dry autumn begins on 14 August and ends on 7 December.

Climate data for Dushanbe (1991–2020, extremes 1926–present)
Month	Jan	Feb	Mar	Apr	May	Jun	Jul	Aug	Sep	Oct	Nov	Dec	Year
Record high °C (°F)	21.8 (71.2)	27.7 (81.9)	32.2 (90.0)	36.2 (97.2)	38.8 (101.8)	44.1 (111.4)	43.7 (110.7)	45.0 (113.0)	38.9 (102.0)	36.8 (98.2)	31.9 (89.4)	24.3 (75.7)	45.0 (113.0)
Mean daily maximum °C (°F)	9.0 (48.2)	11.0 (51.8)	17.0 (62.6)	22.8 (73.0)	27.9 (82.2)	33.6 (92.5)	36.4 (97.5)	35.5 (95.9)	31.3 (88.3)	24.4 (75.9)	16.7 (62.1)	11.1 (52.0)	23.1 (73.6)
Daily mean °C (°F)	3.1 (37.6)	5.0 (41.0)	10.5 (50.9)	15.8 (60.4)	20.1 (68.2)	25.1 (77.2)	27.4 (81.3)	26.0 (78.8)	21.2 (70.2)	14.7 (58.5)	9.0 (48.2)	4.6 (40.3)	15.2 (59.4)
Mean daily minimum °C (°F)	−0.9 (30.4)	0.5 (32.9)	5.5 (41.9)	10.1 (50.2)	13.4 (56.1)	17.2 (63.0)	18.9 (66.0)	17.2 (63.0)	12.7 (54.9)	7.8 (46.0)	3.8 (38.8)	0.4 (32.7)	8.9 (48.0)
Record low °C (°F)	−26.6 (−15.9)	−17.6 (0.3)	−12.9 (8.8)	−6.1 (21.0)	1.2 (34.2)	8.4 (47.1)	10.9 (51.6)	8.2 (46.8)	−1.0 (30.2)	−4.4 (24.1)	−13.5 (7.7)	−19.5 (−3.1)	−26.6 (−15.9)
Average precipitation mm (inches)	61 (2.4)	94 (3.7)	103 (4.1)	114 (4.5)	77 (3.0)	17 (0.7)	3 (0.1)	1 (0.0)	4 (0.2)	29 (1.1)	55 (2.2)	60 (2.4)	618 (24.4)
Average precipitation days (≥ 1.0 mm)	8.5	9.1	13.4	9.8	7.8	1.5	0.7	0.1	0.8	3.7	5.3	8.1	68.8
Average relative humidity (%)	69	67	65	63	57	42	41	44	44	56	63	69	57
Mean monthly sunshine hours	120	121	156	198	281	337	352	338	289	224	164	119	2,699
Source 1: Pogoda.ru.net
Source 2: Deutscher Wetterdienst (humidity 1951–1993 and precipitation days 1961–1990) NOAA (sun, 1961–1990)

=== Flora and fauna ===
Before the 20th century, the city had some vegetation such as bushes of Bukhara almonds, but the creation of the city mostly removed natural vegetation. The green belt, however, and the botanical garden introduced new vegetation to the city. The city has over 150 species of trees and shrubs, with only about 15 native to the city and 22% of the city being occupied by green space.

There are 14 identified species of mammals in urban Dushanbe, including a fox, a weasel, the marbled polecat, the long-eared hedgehog, five bats, and five rodents. There are 130 identified bird species in the city, such as rock pigeons, blue pigeons, and turtle doves. Migratory birds are common, often staying only in fall and summer. There are 47 identified reptiles in Dushanbe, such as geckos, snakes, lizards, and turtles. Amphibians, like the marsh frog and the green toad, live in the cleaner water bodies of the city. The 14 identified fish species of Dushanbe live in the rivers, lakes, and ponds of the city. Some species are the marinka, the Tajik char, and the Turkestan catfish in the Varzob rivers, along with 7 in the Kofarnikhon, and species like carp, goldfish, striped swine, and mosquito fish in the lakes and ponds. 300 identified species of insects inhabit the city, mostly cicadas, psyllids, aphids, scale insects, bugs, beetles, and butterflies. The endemic Hissar grape hawk moth lives in the city as well, and malaria-carrying insects have been increasing in the city. Phytonematodes are a menace to plants in the city, with 55 distinct identified species, the most damaging of which are the root gall nematodes. Rare or endangered species include the radiant tachysphex, the white-bellied arrow eagle, and the European free-tailed bat.

=== Districts ===
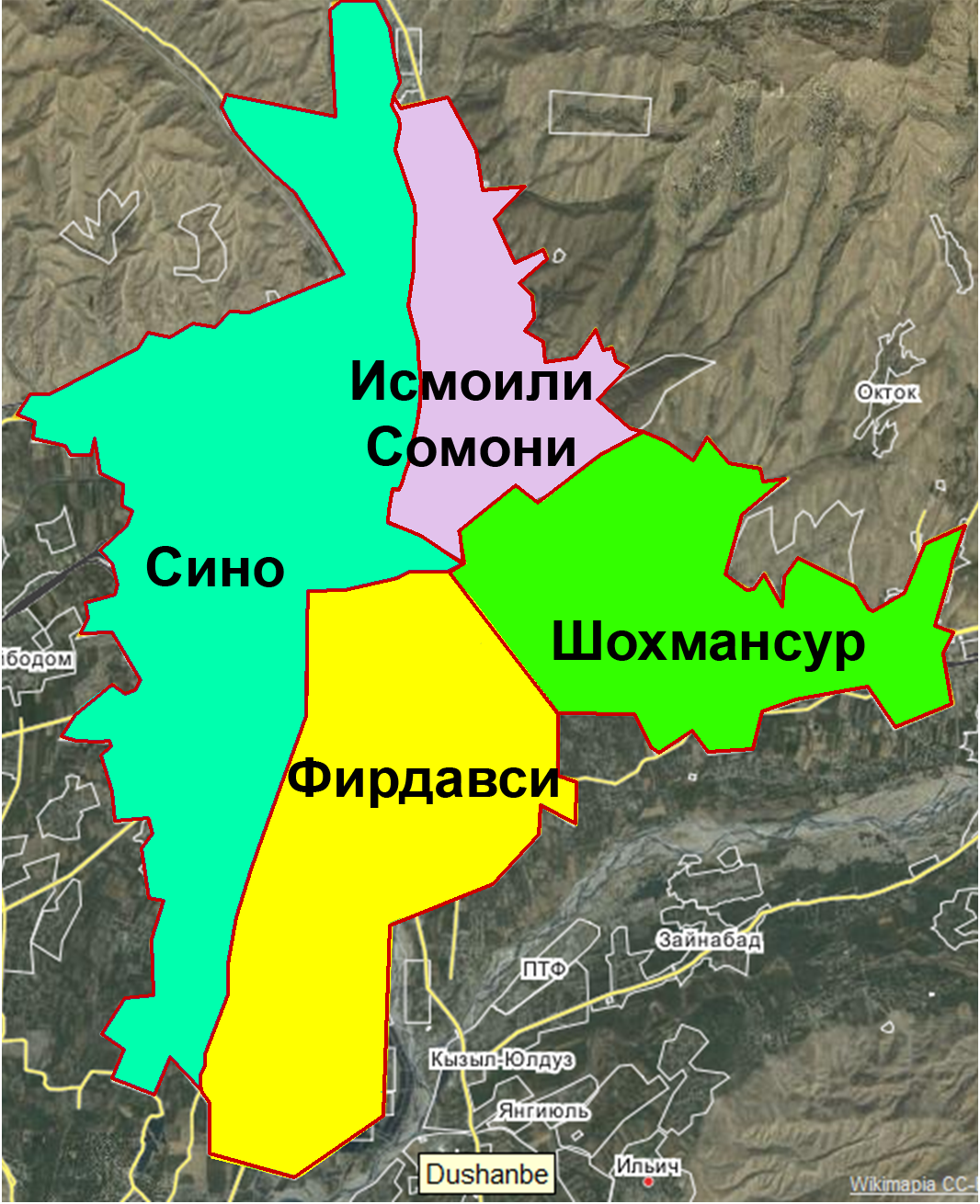
Districts of Dushanbe before the 2020 expansion Dark Green: Shah Mansur Purple: Ismail Samani Light Green: Avicenna Yellow: Ferdowsi

Dushanbe is divided into the following districts:

District name	Former name	Area, km^{2} (2020)	Population, persons (as of previous 2019 borders)	District Chairman
Ismail Samani (Tajik: Исмоили Сомонӣ, Ismoili Somoni; Persian: اسماعیل سامانی‌)	October (Октябрьский)	37.6	148,700	Sami Sharif Hamid
Avicenna (Sino) (Tajik: Абӯалӣ Ибни Сино, Abūali Ibni Sino; Persian: ابوعلی ابن سینا‌)	Frunzensky (Фрунзенский)	62.2	326,100	Salimzoda Nusratullo Faizullo
Ferdowsi (Tajik: Фирдавсӣ, Firdavsi; Persian: فردوسی‌)	Central (Центральный)	54.5	209,000	Yusufi Muhammadrahim
Shah Mansur (Tajik: Шоҳмансур, Shohmansur; Persian: شاه منصور‌)	Railway (Железнодорожный)	48.9	162,600	Bilol Ibrohim

In 2020, the city's boundaries were expanded to take in land from Rudaki District in the southwest.

Land use in Dushanbe as of 2020
Land	Area (ha)
Irrigated land	2,091.75
Orchards	145.21
Silk gardens	12.28
Citrus orchards	2.10
Pastures	25.79
Settlements	6390.85
Private farms/gardens	65.79
Swamp	3.7
Bush thickets	1372.0026
Reservoirs	1436.66
Underground passages	310.2
Construction	7227.51
Land not used for agriculture	1235.03

=== Main sights ===
Some of Dushanbe's major sights include the Tajikistan National Museum; the National Museum of Antiquities; the Ismaili Centre; Vahdat Palace; the Dushanbe Flagpole, which is the second tallest free-standing flagpole in the world, at a height of 165 metres (541 feet); the Dushanbe Zoo; Rudaki Avenue, the main street of the capital; the Gurminj Museum of Musical Instruments; and the National Library, the largest in Central Asia, with 3.11 million copies of books.

Main sights of Dushanbe

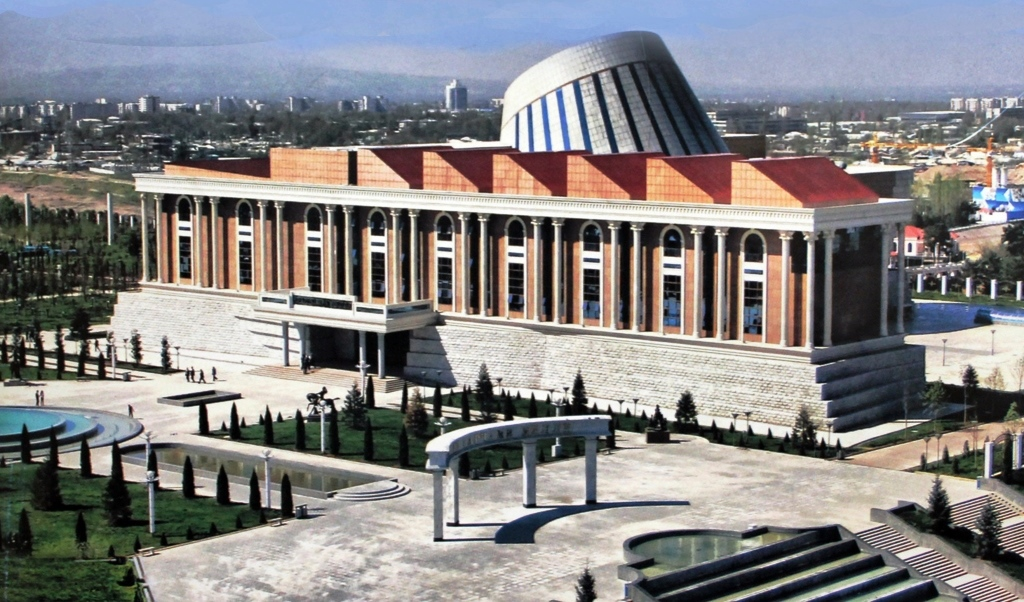
National Museum of Tajikistan

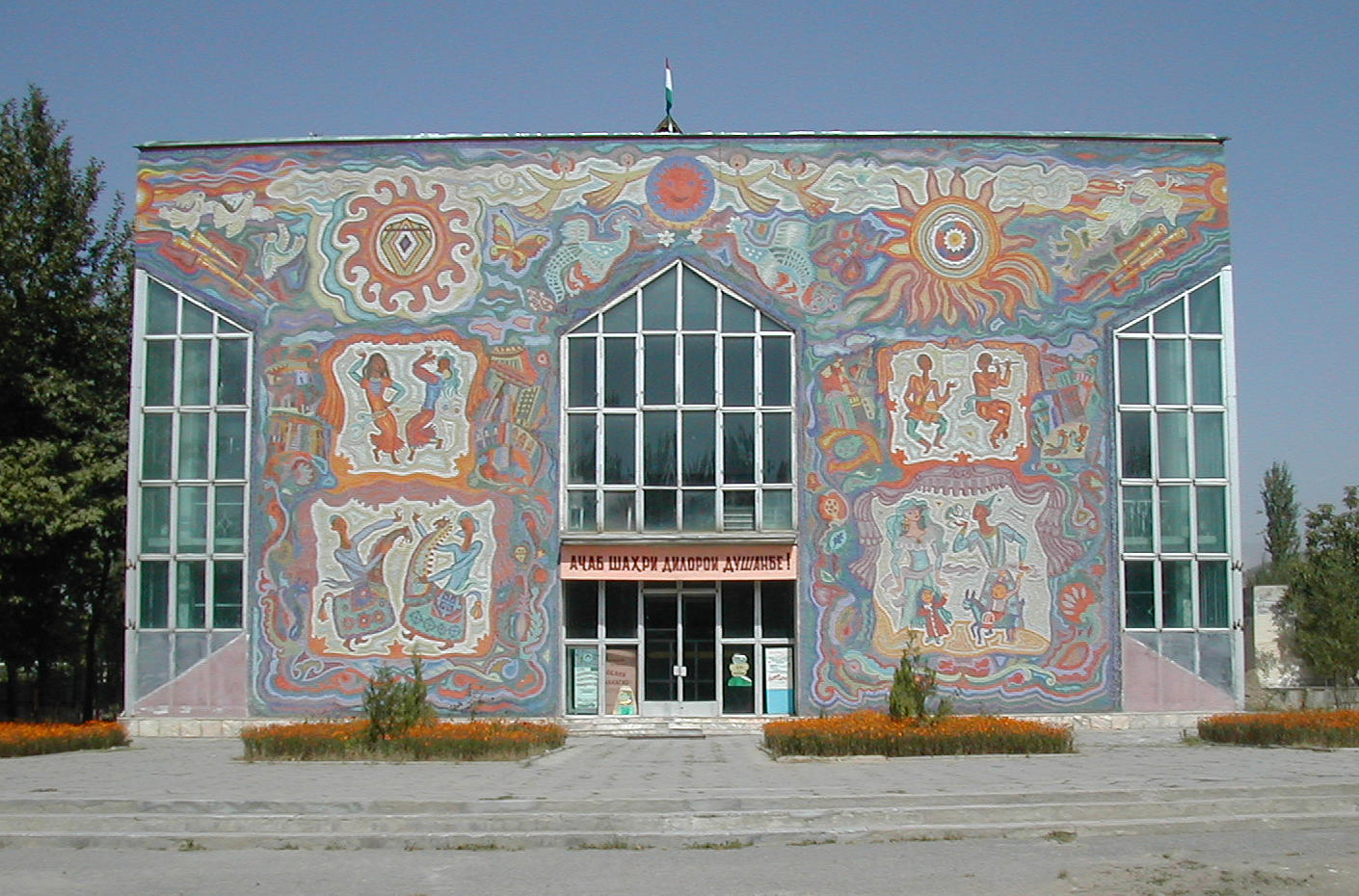
Puppet Theater

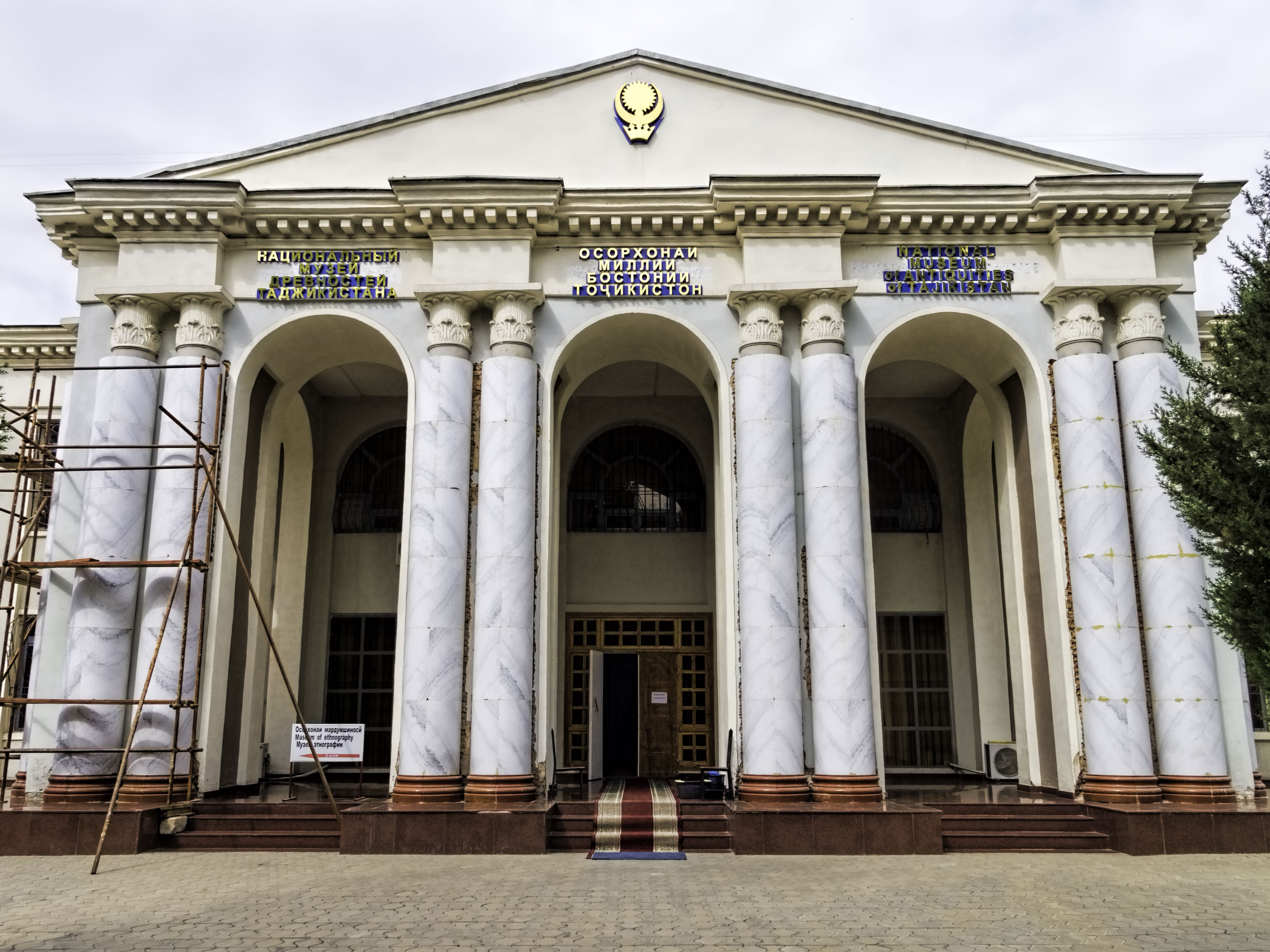
National Museum of Antiquities

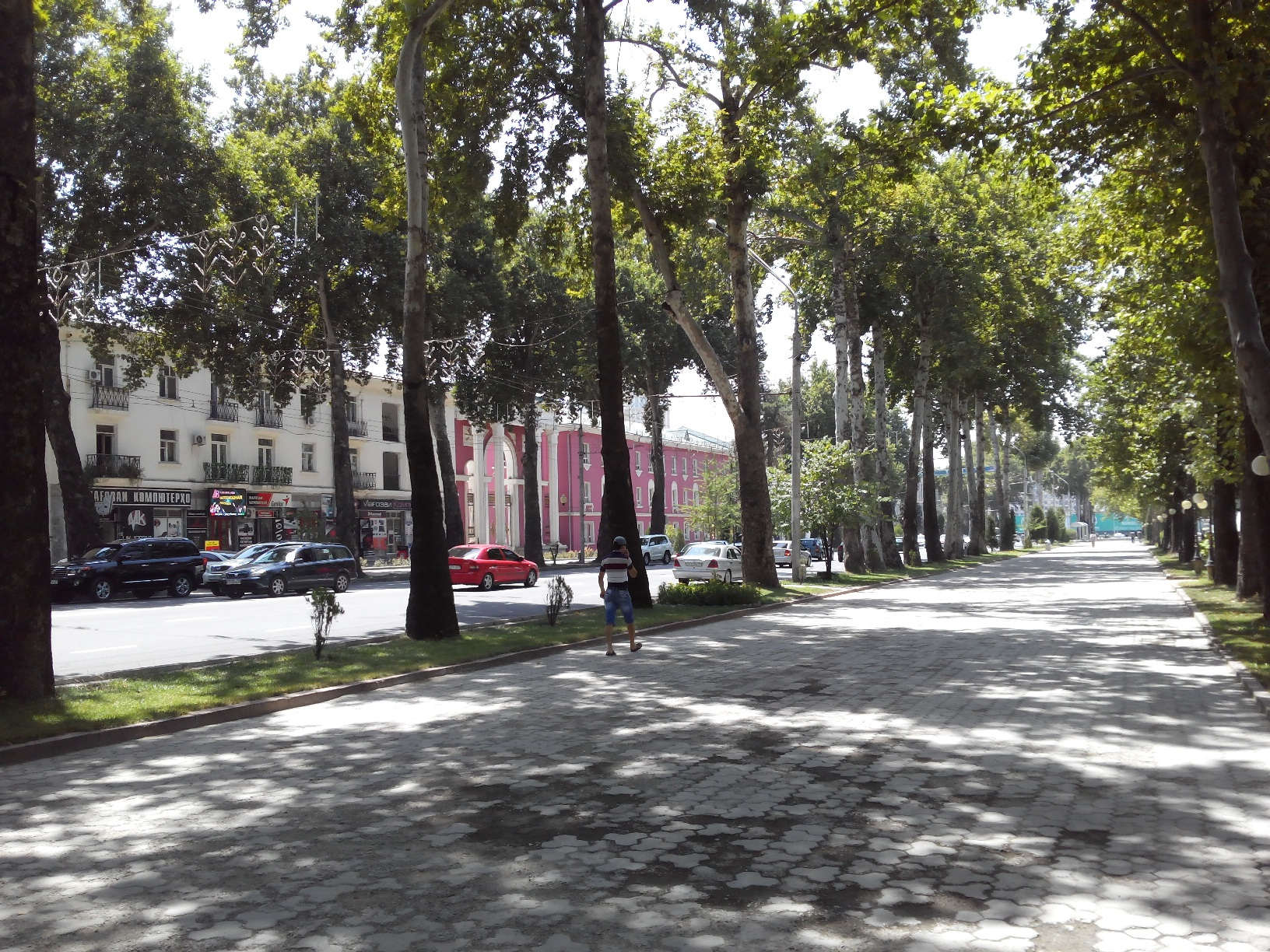
Rudaki Avenue

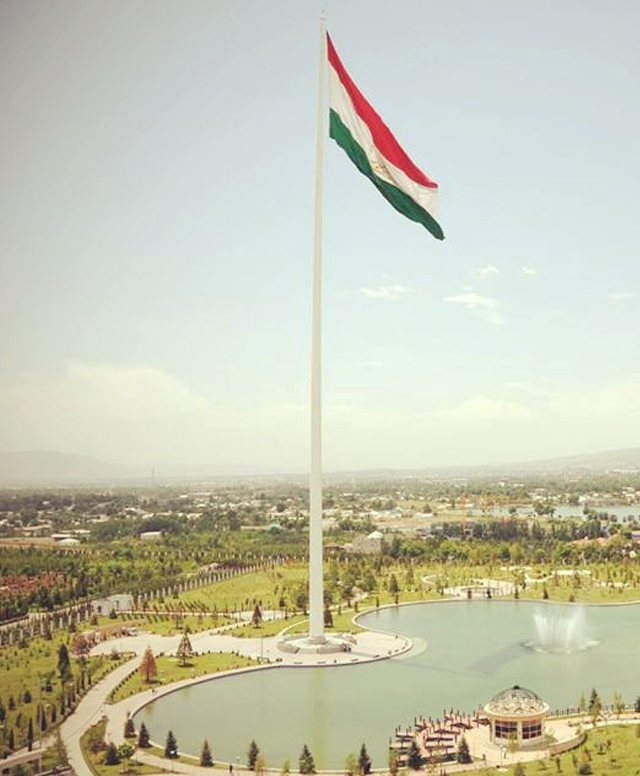
Dushanbe Flagpole

== Demographics ==
The population of Dushanbe grew at a rapid pace following the Soviet invasion of the 1920s, declined during the Tajik Civil War and rising unrest of the 1990s, and resumed its growth after that period. During the mid 20th century, the city had a majority Russian/Eastern European population, but after the civil war, many Russians departed the city and the Tajik population became predominant. From 2005 to 2014, 53,118 people migrated to the city in total. The average life expectancy of Dushanbe in 2014 was 74.1 years overall, with 71.9 years for men and 76.3 for women.

Historical population
Year	Pop.	±%
1676	7,500	—
1875	10,000	+33.3%
1911	20,000	+100.0%
1920	3,140	−84.3%
1924	283	−91.0%
1926	5,600	+1878.8%
1929	7,298	+30.3%
1939	82,540	+1031.0%
1949	150,000	+81.7%
1959	233,500	+55.7%
1970	376,200	+61.1%
1979	492,200	+30.8%
1989	601,501	+22.2%
2000	564,000	−6.2%
2010	731,100	+29.6%
2020	863,400	+18.1%
2022	1,201,800	+39.2%

Ethnic composition of Dushanbe by year
Year	Tajik	Russian	Uzbek	Tatar	Ukrainian	Jewish	Korean	German	Turkmen	Kirghiz	Kazakh	Other
1939	12.05	56.95	9.02	4.71	5.95	4.09	.01	.46	0.05	0.11	0.42	6.18
1959	18.7	47.83	10.31	5.5	4.4	3.88	0.14	3.55	0.05	0.11	0.17	5.36
1970	26.4	41.92	10.26	5.13	3.54	3.04	0.87	3.62	0.08	0.14	0.15	4.85
1979	31.61	38.51	10.03	4.73	3.59	2.26	1.01	3.09	0.11	0.14	0.15	4.77
1989	39.13	32.37	10.43	4.09	3.55	2	1.10	2.28	0.12	0.17	0.18	4.58
2000	84.4	5.1	9.1	.7	.3	.02				.06		1.32
2003	83.4	5.1		.7	.3		.1	1.1				9.3
2010	89.5	2.63	6.71	0.26					.1	0.08	0.03	0.7

The main languages spoken in Dushanbe are the two official languages, Tajik and Russian, along with the widely-spoken minority language Uzbek.

=== Religion ===
The Central Mosque of Dushanbe, the largest mosque and religious building in Tajikistan

Islam was introduced to Dushanbe in the eighth century and today, the majority of the city follows Sunni Islam. There is a small Catholic community of 120 in the city at St Joseph Church. There are around 350 Jews in Tajikistan, whose synagogue was destroyed in 2006 but was replaced in 2008.

On 9 September 2009, Mayor Mahmadsaid Ubaidulloyev endorsed the Islamic Educational, Scientific and Cultural Organization's plan to recognize Dushanbe as the 2010 capital of Islamic culture. In October 2009, President Emomali Rahmon launched the construction of a new central mosque in Dushanbe built at the expense of Qatari investors. It replaced the existing Haji Yakub Mosque and should become the largest in Central Asia. Construction began in 2011 with an original opening date in 2014; however in February 2021, its revised opening date was delayed. On 8 June 2023, it was opened as the Central Mosque of Dushanbe by Emomali Rahmon and Qatari Emir Tamim bin Hamad Al Thani.

The Russian Orthodox Church is another religious group in the city. St. Nicholas Cathedral in Dushanbe is a center of worship for the Orthodox community.

Religious buildings in Dushanbe

Haji Yaqub Mosque

St. Nicholas Cathedral

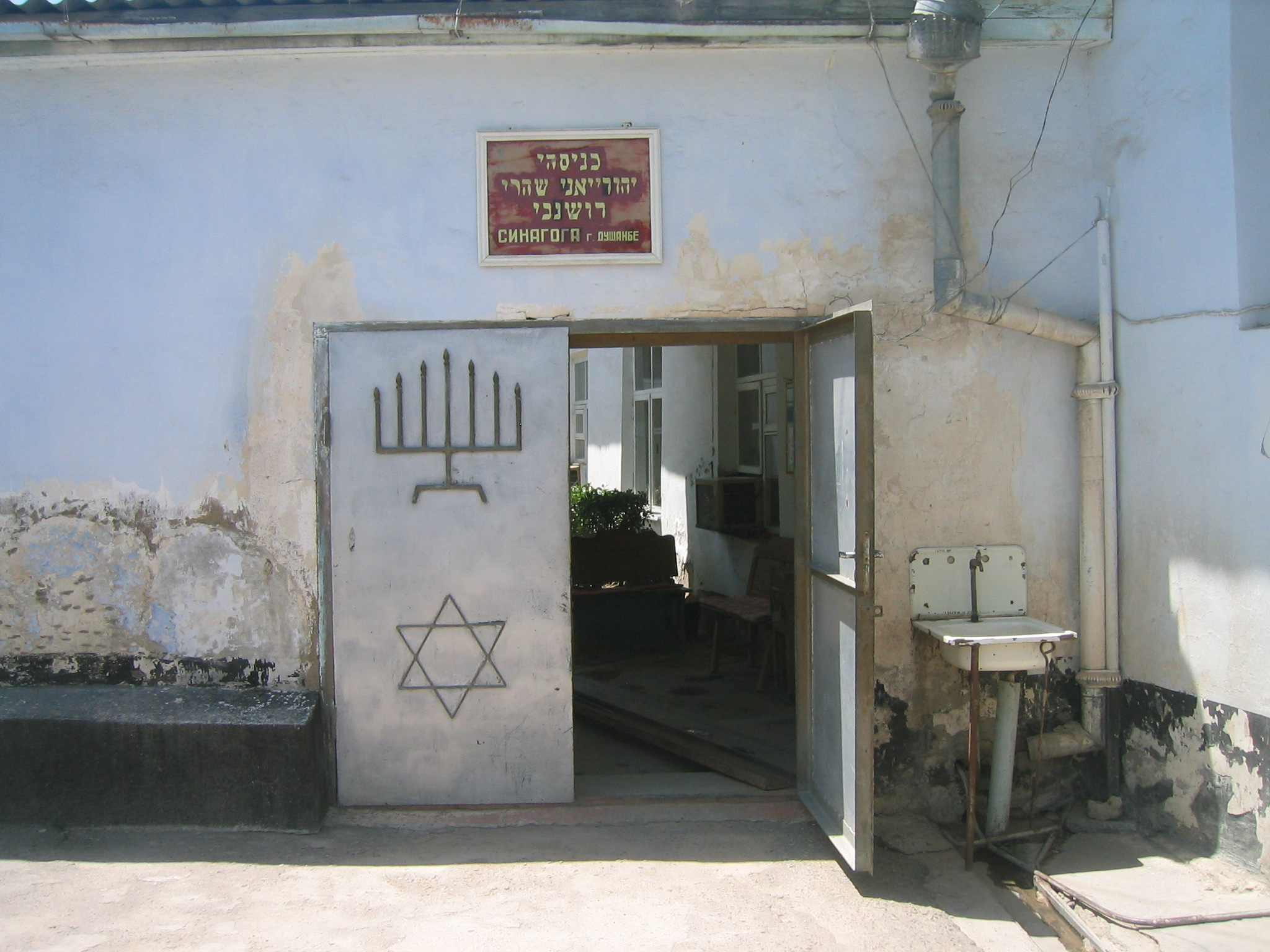
Dushanbe Synagogue

== Education ==
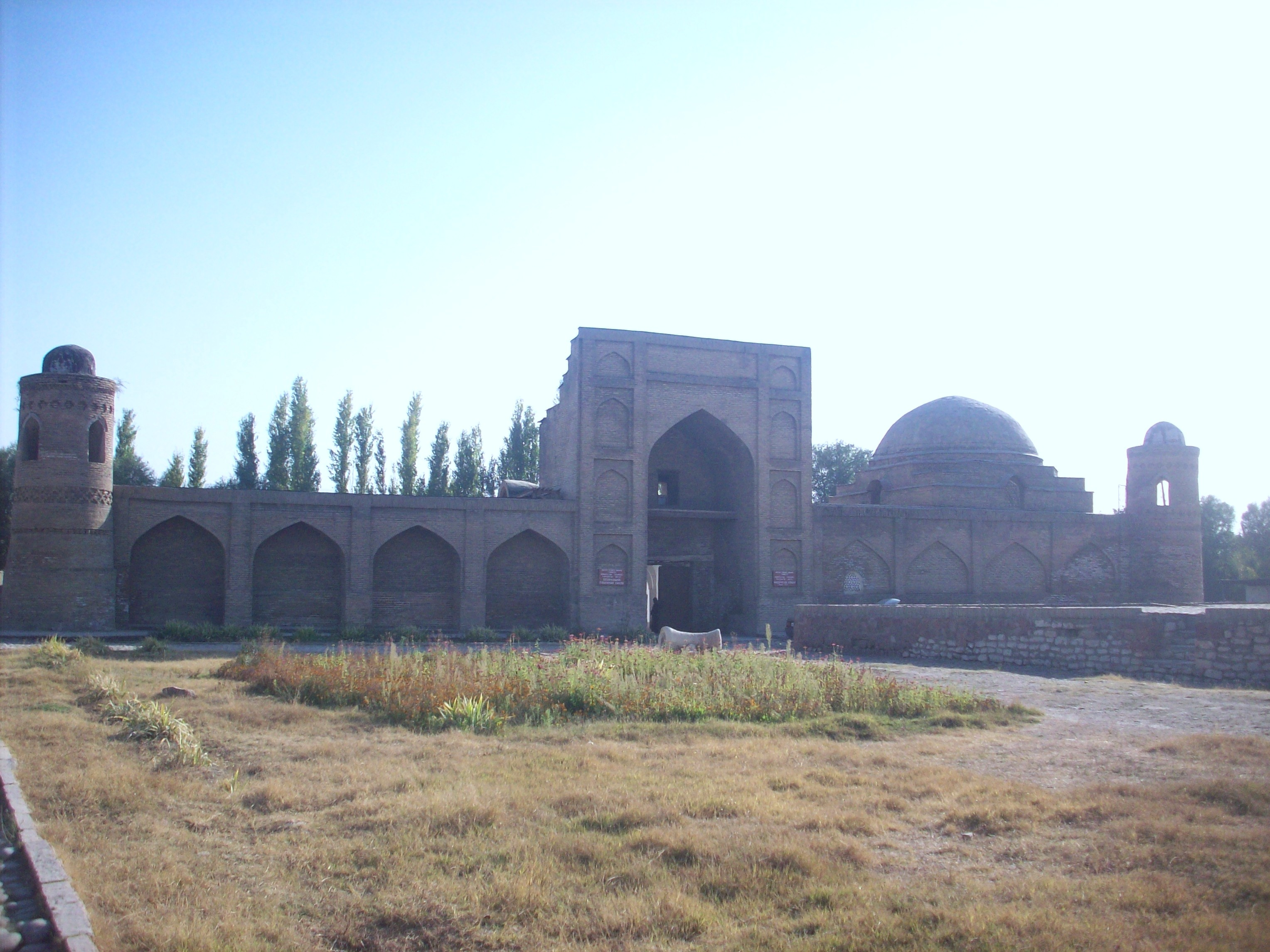
Madrassa just west of Dushanbe

Before the Soviet invasion, education was limited in Dushanbe, mainly consisting of madrasas that taught the Quran and Persian and Arabic along with geography, geometry, algebra, and other sciences. After the invasion, the Soviet Union closed the madrasas down.

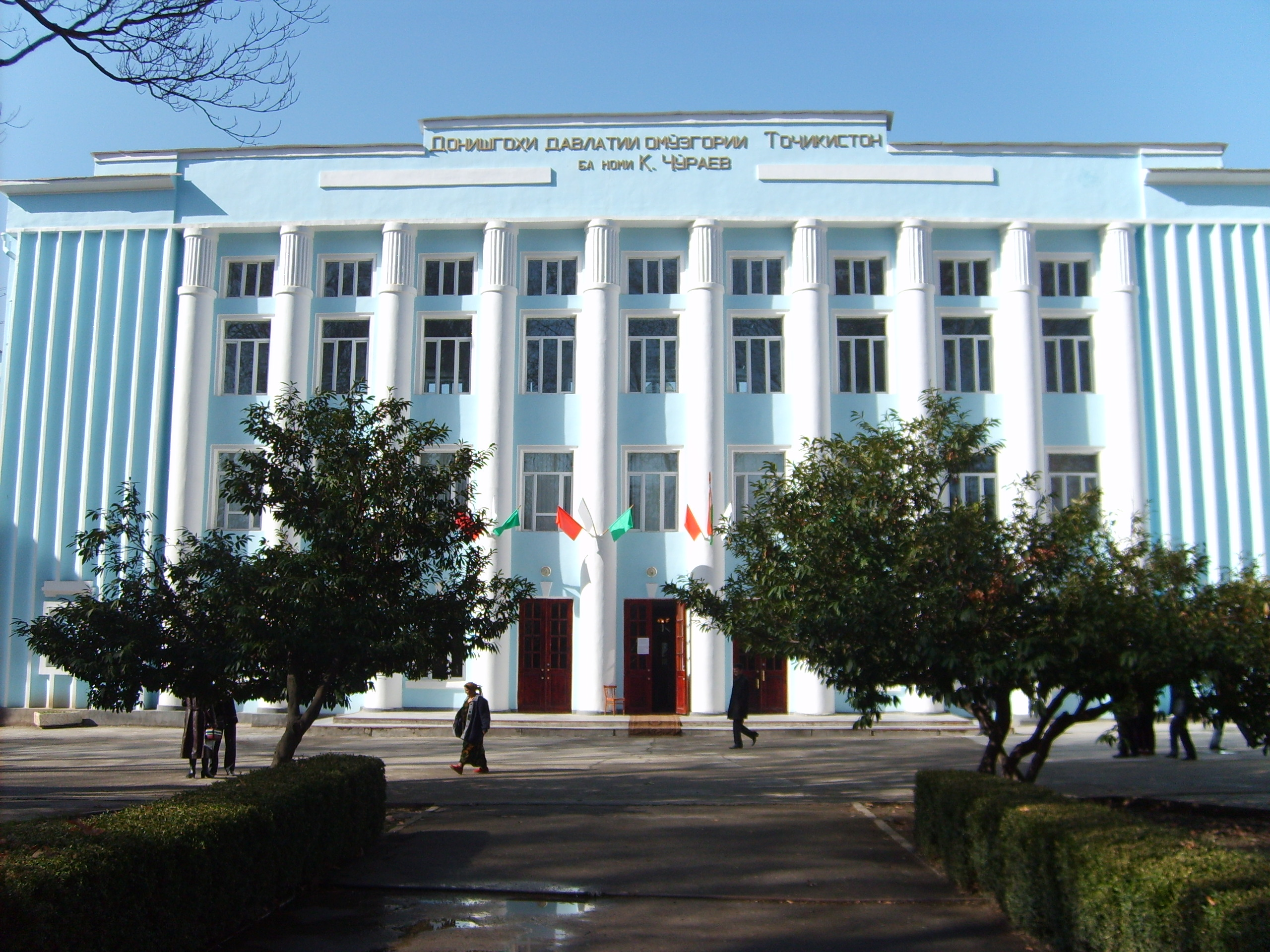
Dushanbe State Pedagogical Institute, the first university in Dushanbe

The Soviet education system was considered a success for its time, achieving close to 100% literacy through a large scale literacy program and compulsory education along with the inclusion of girls in education.

The People's Commissariat of Education of the Tajik SSR was created on 11 February 1925 in Dushanbe. Higher education began to be established in the 1930s with the creation of a pedagogical institute in Dushanbe in 1931. In 1939, the Tajik State Medical University was founded in Dushanbe and soon after in 1944 the Tajik Agrarian Institute moved to Dushanbe. Before the outbreak of World War Two, there were 32 secondary schools and two institutes in the city. While World War 2 slowed the growth of higher education, afterwards in 1947 the Tajik State University was created. In 1956 a polytechnic institute was created in the city along with the Institute of Physical Culture in 1971, the Institute of Arts in 1973, and the Tajik Pedagogical Institute of Russian Language and Literature in 1980 which became the Tajik State Institute of Languages in 1987. In 1990, the Technological University of Tajikistan was founded.

The Soviet system was based on the needs of the economy; the agrarian, medical, and polytechnic institutes were all founded to aid the economy. Outside of that, most higher education in the system were in the form of pedagogical colleges. Restrictions on political subjects such as history hampered advancements in those fields. After independence, universities less precisely tailored their courses to the economy and as a result other professions proliferated in schools such as the Tajik University of Law, Business and Politics.

The civil war after independence devastated the education system of the city, with state budgets falling from 11% to 2% during the time period. While state spending declined, private institutions temporarily developed in the market economy, accounting for growth in the number of universities in Dushanbe after independence.

The modern state university in Dushanbe, the Tajik State Pedagogical University, has an enrollment in the thousands. Institutions such as the Tajik Technical University, the Tajik Agrarian University, the Tajik State University of Commerce and the Technological University of Tajikistan, some of which existed during the Soviet era, grew and admitted anywhere from 5000 to 9000 students. Specialized and technical schools also expanded significantly.

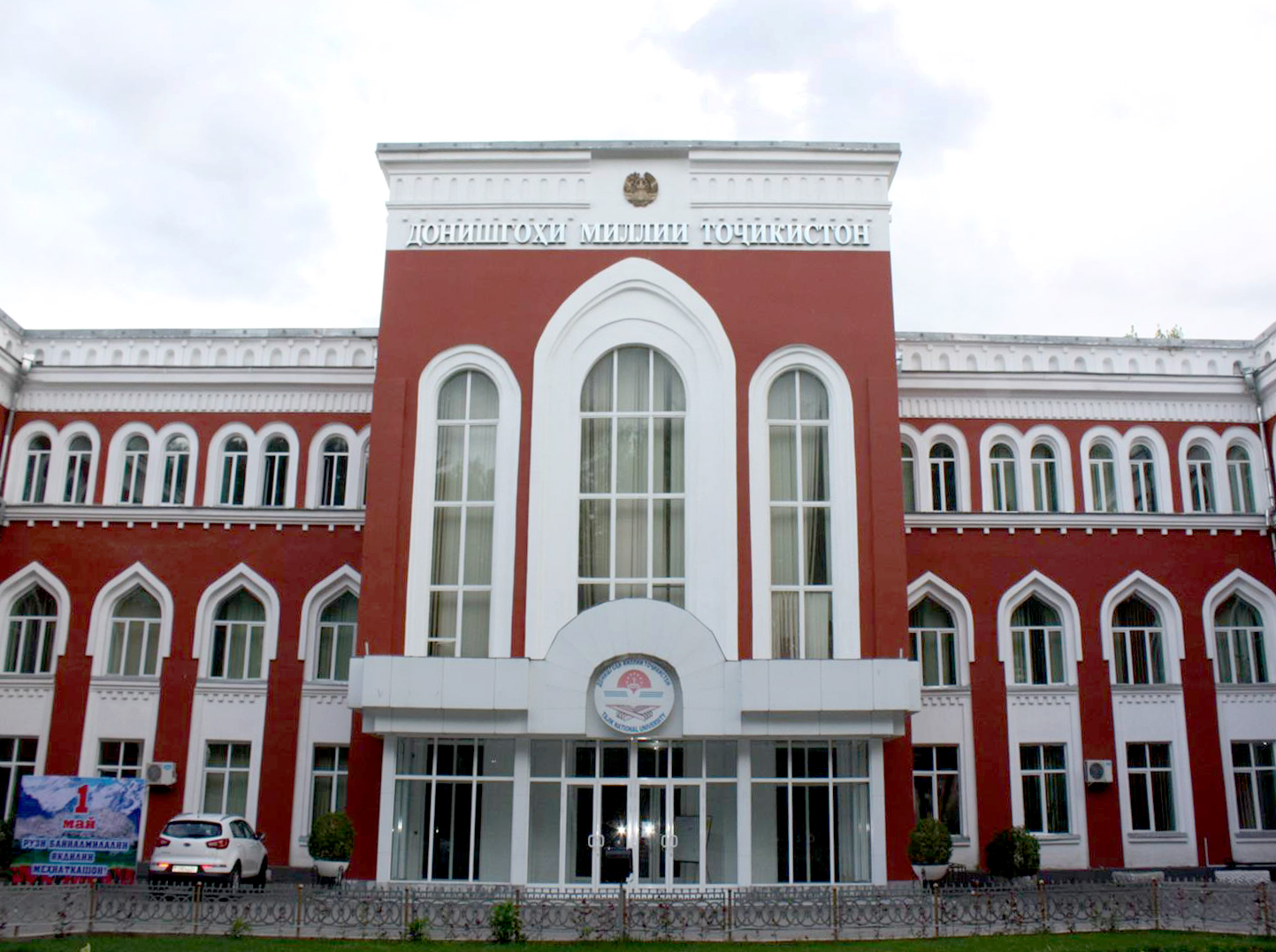
Tajik National University

Today, 60% of university students in Tajikistan are enrolled in Dushanbe, which has 23 universities with 103,600 students, 13 colleges with 16,100 students enrolled and 140 schools that have 180,800 students. As of 2015, there is one national university in Dushanbe, the Tajik National University, 7 specialized universities, 4 international bilateral institutions, and 12 institutes in the capital. In the 2018/2019 academic year, there were 23 higher education institutions with 103,600 students. There were also 124 preschools and 140 general education schools in the city.

The Russian-language Russian-Tajik Slavonic University was created in the 1990s during a trend of closure of Russian language instruction due to the exodus of Russians during the civil war. The Islamic Institute of Tajikistan, created with the goal of countering Islamic extremism, had 924 students as of 2020. The University of International Relations, which was founded by a Tajik-American, was founded in opposition to the government and produced opposition leaders until it was shut down. In 2009, due to the efforts of Emomali Rahmon, a Dushanbe branch of the Moscow State University was opened. 70% of the instructors are Russian, while only 30% are Tajik. Other branches of Russian universities in Dushanbe include a branch of the Moscow Institute of Steel and Alloy and a branch of the Moscow Energy Institute.

The Tajik National University is the most prominent in the city and the country. With an enrollment of over 21,000 students and a large number of programs it is the flagship university of Tajikistan. Uniquely, the university is directly funded by the government while also being more independent of it compared to other state universities. While in principle this provides academic freedom, in reality the government is still heavily involved, censors content, and controls appointments at the university. Dushanbe's education system is still heavily managed by the national government, a relic of Soviet times. Other schools include the Tajikistan Humanitarian International University, the Dushanbe International School, and the Tax Law Institute, now the Tajik State University of Finance and Economics.

== Transportation ==
=== Air transport ===
Rashid Beck Ahriev and Peter Komarov piloted the first flight to the city from Bukhara on 3 September 1924 on a Junkers F-13; the service ran three times a week from small airfield on modern day Rudaki Avenue. In 1927, the second air route in the Soviet Union opened from Tashkent to Samarkand to Termez to Dushanbe on the Junkers F-13, two years before the introduction of automobiles and five before the railway. A small Stalinabad airport was created, and in 1930 a first-class airport was constructed in the city. The first scheduled flight from the city began in 1945 on the Li-2. The state airline, Tojikiston - now known as Tajik Air - was created in 1949. In the 50s and 60s, many new aircraft were introduced to the Tajik Civil Air Fleet. The Tajik Civil Aviation Administration won first place in the USSR for efficiency in the 1980s.

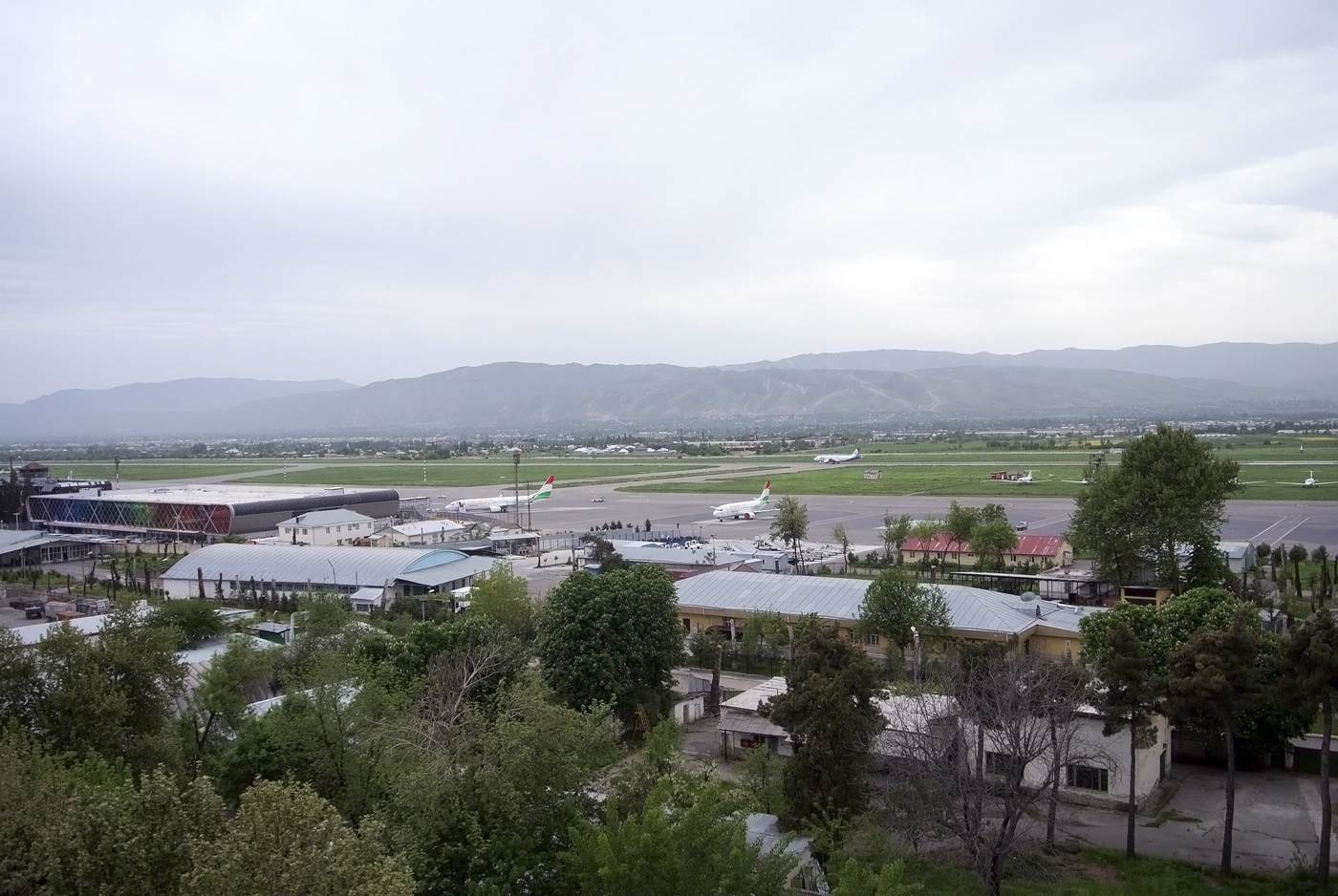
View of Dushanbe International Airport

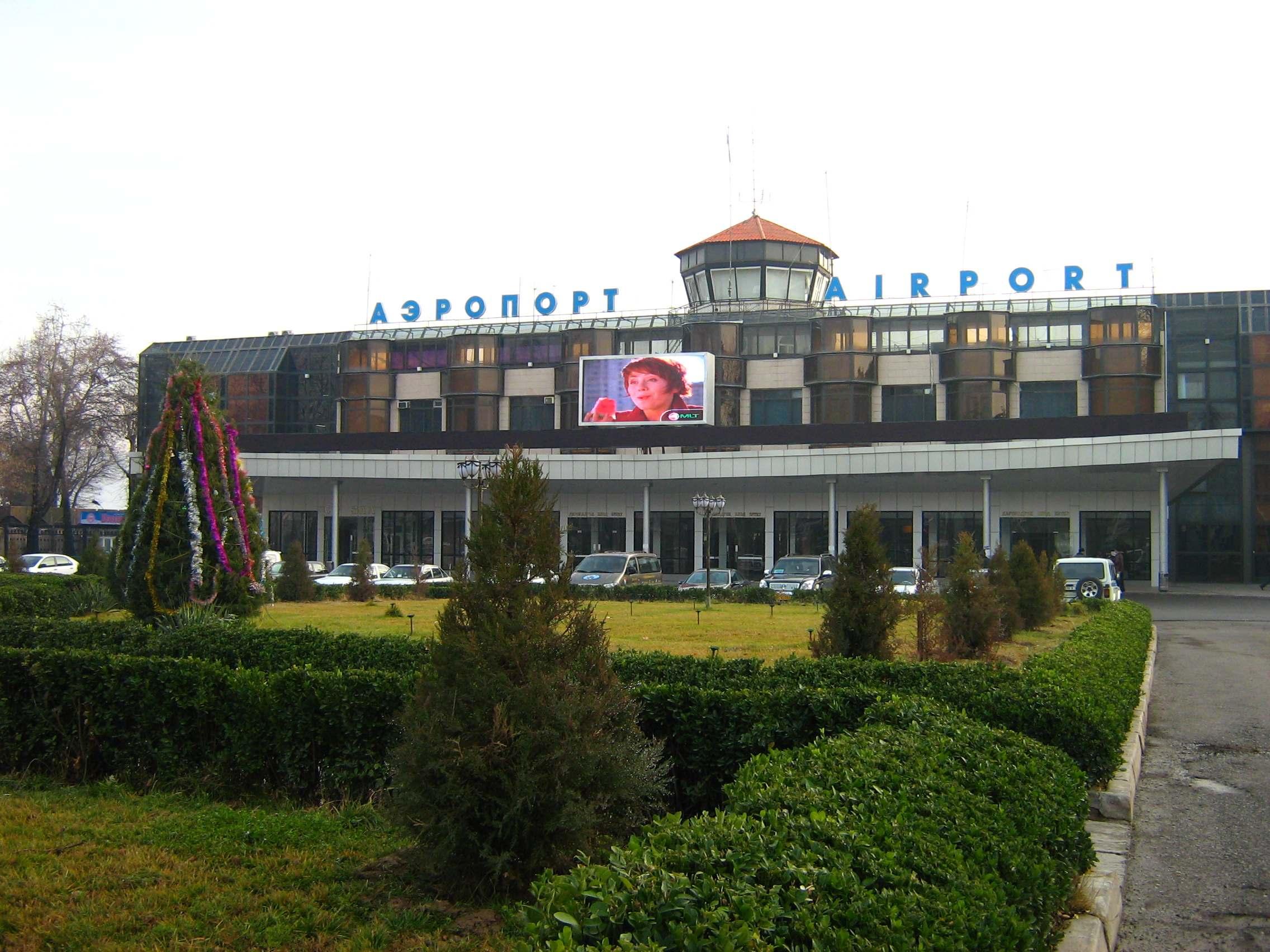
Terminal of Dushanbe International Airport

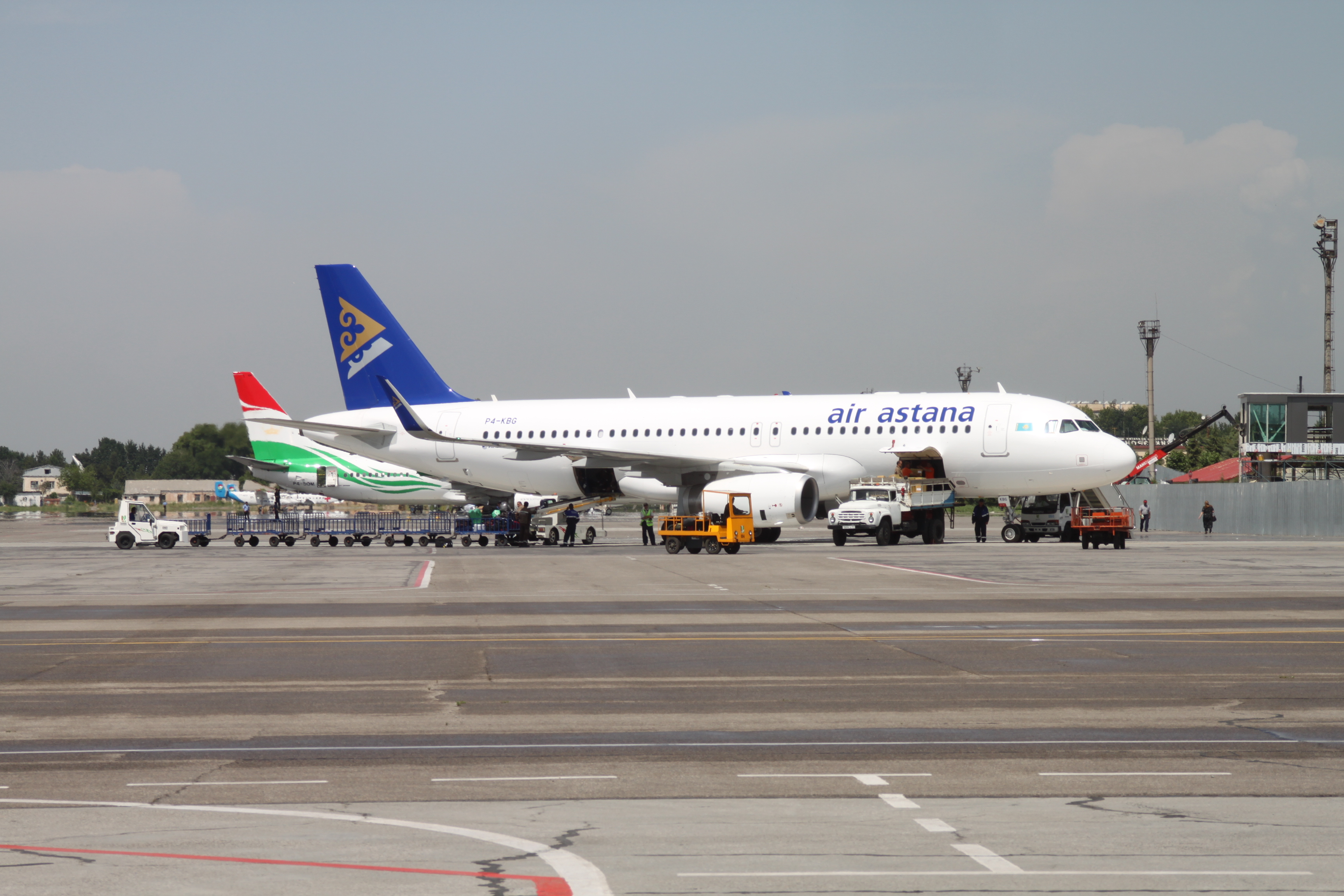
Air Astana plane at Dushanbe International Airport

The city is served by Dushanbe International Airport which, as of April 2015, had regularly scheduled flights to Ürümqi, Kabul, Delhi, Dubai, Istanbul, Frankfurt, and major cities in Russia and Central Asia, amongst others. Tajik Air had its head office on the grounds of Dushanbe Airport in Dushanbe. Somon Air, which opened in 2008, has its head office in Dushanbe. The government planned to devote .18% of Tajikistan's GDP to the development of aviation in a large part in Dushanbe. Japanese investors created a cargo terminal at the airport, costing $28 million.

=== Road system ===
The first road in the country, from the early 19th century, was to Guzor, traversed by camels, and made into a modern road by the Soviets. The first bus line was started in 1930 and taxi service began in 1937. Automobiles are the main form of transportation in the country and in Dushanbe. One major road goes through the mountains from Khujand to Dushanbe through the Anzob Tunnel, constructed by an Iranian operator. A second major road goes east from Dushanbe to Khorog in the Gorno-Badakhshan Autonomous Province, then to Murghab, and then splits into roads towards China and Kyrgyzstan.

Many highway and tunnel construction projects are underway or have recently been completed (as of 2014). Major projects include rehabilitation of the Dushanbe – Chanak (Uzbek border), Dushanbe – Kulma (Chinese border), Bokhtar – Nizhny Pyanj (Afghan border) highways and construction of tunnels under the mountain passes of Anzob, Shakhristan, Shar-Shar and Chormazak.

=== Rail transport ===
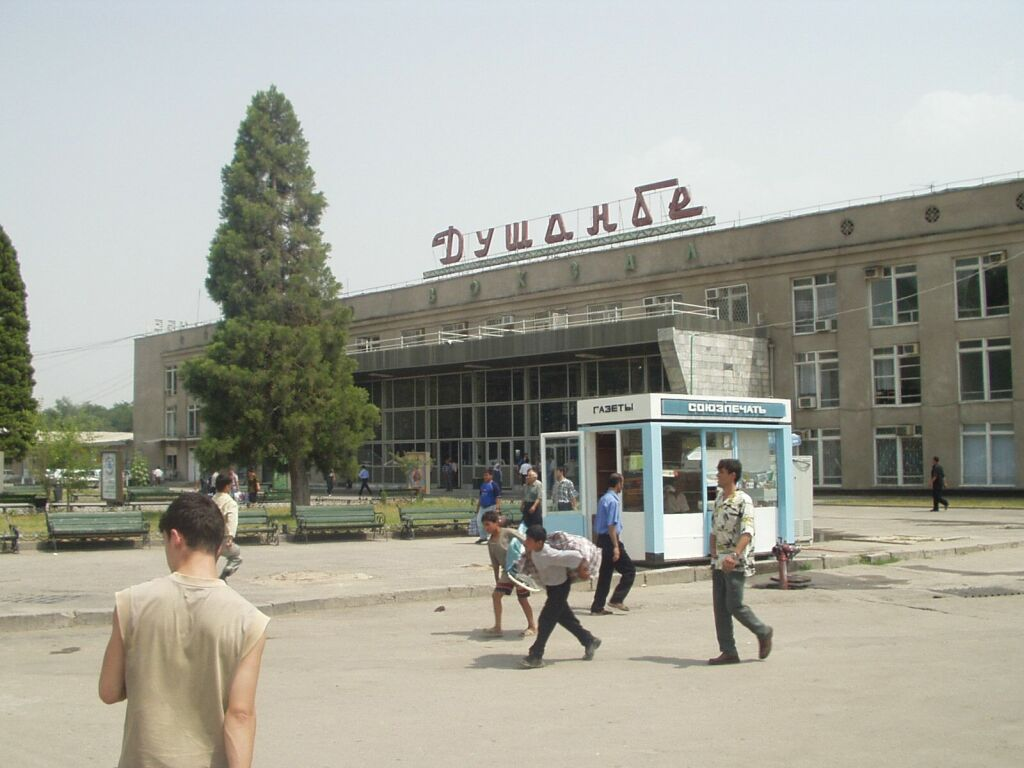
Dushanbe Railway Station

The first rail line in Dushanbe, which was 245 kilometres (152 mi) long, was built from 1926 to 1929 and opened on 10 September 1929 from Vhadat to Dushanbe to Termez that ultimately connected Dushanbe with Moscow. In 1933 and 1941, two other narrow-gauge railroad lines were laid from Dushanbe, to Gulpista and Kurgan-Tyube. In 2002, a new railroad administration took over that modernized the system.

Today, Tajikistan's principal railways are in the southern region and connect Dushanbe with the industrial areas of the Hisar and Vakhsh valleys and with Uzbekistan, Turkmenistan, Kazakhstan and Russia. Tajikistan's railways are owned and operated by Tajik Railway. In the early 2000s, a new railway line from Dushanbe to Gharm to Jirghatol was constructed that would connect the country to Russia, Kazakhstan, and Kyrgyzstan while not going through Uzbekistan due to contemporary geopolitical tensions. A proposed line from Dushanbe to Herat and Mashad is also being promoted by the government. On 18 June 2018, the first railway between Dushanbe and Astana, the capital of Kazakhstan, completed its trip through Uzbekistan's Karakalpakstan region. Tajikistan's northern railway system remains isolated from its other railway lines, including those of Dushanbe. There is also a service from Dushanbe to Khujand and the northern Uzbek town of Pakhtaabad.

=== Trolleybus system ===
Trolleybuses in Dushanbe

The Dushanbe trolleybus system began on 6 April 1955 when a trolleybus administration was organized in the city. On 1 May 1955, the first Trolza trolleybus began operation on Lenin Avenue, the main avenue of Dushanbe. Routes continued to be added in 1957 and 1958 and in 1967, 9 routes were opened and the length of the network reached 49 kilometres (30 mi). The collapse of the Soviet Union led to a crisis in the system, as fuel increased in price and looting became a consistent problem, with one incident occurring at the central bus station leading to the temporary suspension of lines. During the period, the number of trolleybuses declined from a high of 250 during the late 1980s to only 45–50. 100 new trolleybuses were ordered in 2004 which were delivered a couple years after and aided in the resumption of service.

In 2020, the European Bank for Reconstruction and Development gave $8 million to repair the system. As of 2020, Dushanbe had 7 trolleybus routes with 11 million passengers a years. While trolleybuses were the main mode of transport in the Soviet era, today they account for only 2% of motorized trips.

Dushanbe trolleybuses are based upon the ZiU-9 trolleybus design.

- TrolZa-5264.01 "Capital" (Nos. 1000–1003);
- ZiU-682H-016 (012) (Nos. 1004–1039, 2000–2027);
- ZiU-682H-016 (018) (Nos. 1042, 1053, 1054, 1058, 1059, 1072–1083, 2038, 2046, 2051–2079);
- ZiU-682V (Nos. 1177, 2095, 2099).

=== Metro system ===
The construction of an above-ground metro system is due to begin in 2025. The first aerial metro line is expected to be completed in 2040 and connect the Southern Gate and Gulliston (circus area).

== Infrastructure ==
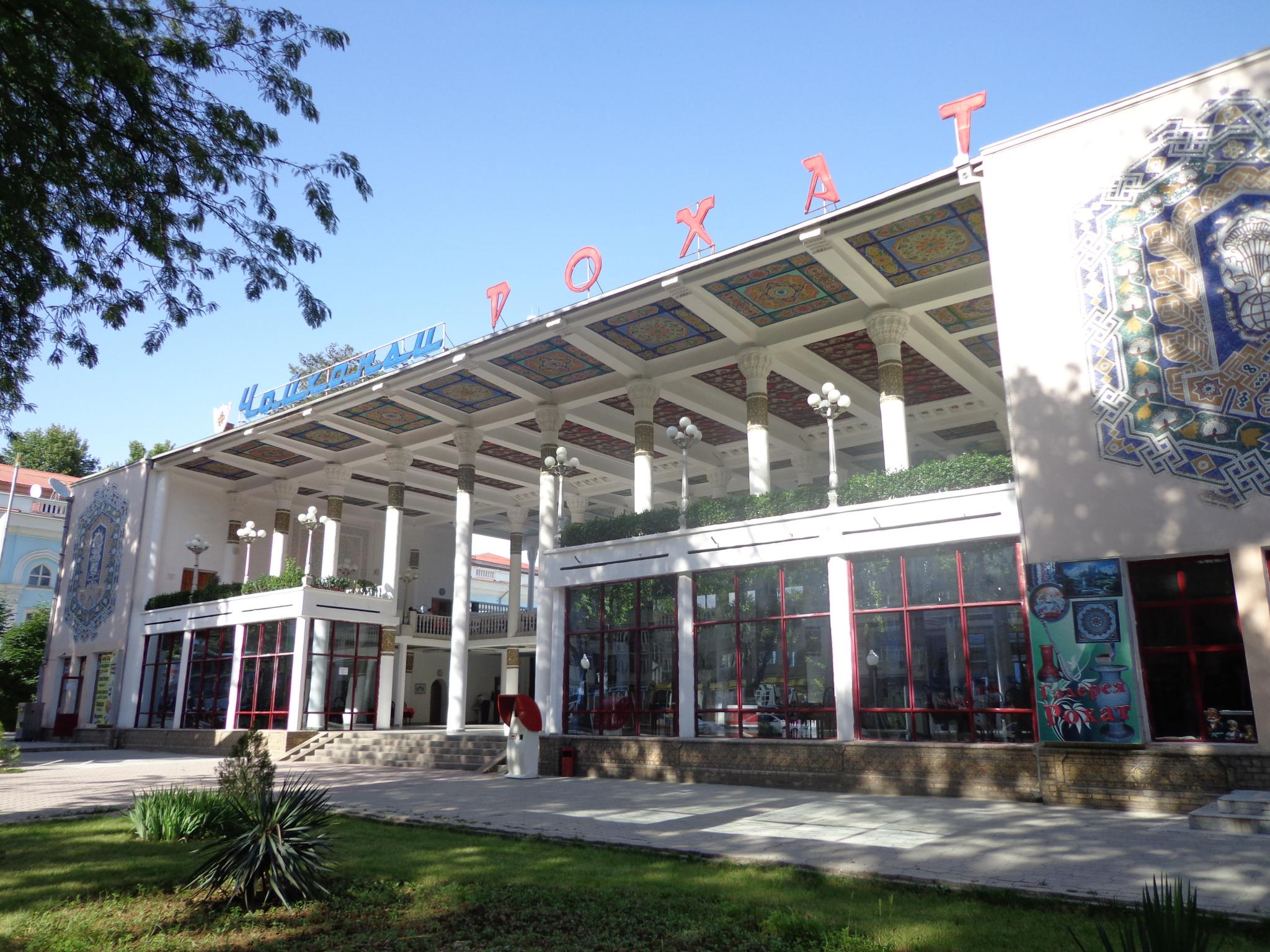
Combination of neoclassical decoration and a minimalist structure from the late 1950s

=== Architecture ===
Before the Soviet invasion, Dushanbe consisted of narrow streets with adobe buildings. None of the buildings from that time survived. The development of the 1920s, soon after the Soviet invasion, laid the groundwork for future development and established the beginning of the city. In the 1930s, constructivist architecture gained prominence along with the building of larger structures, often made out of concrete. Several architects played a major role in the city's construction in a group headed by Peter Vaulin. He drew up a piece of legislation called "On the construction of the city of Dushanbe" which the city adopted on 27 April 1927. He implemented a constructivist design in the city, possibly inspired by his meeting with Le Corbusier in Moscow in 1929.

In 1934 and 1935, the Griprogor Institute, based in Leningrad, created a master plan for the construction of Dushanbe. It was approved on 3 March 1938. The city center during the reconstruction shifted to Red Square and Frunze Park, the location of many workers demonstrations and military parades into the forties. In the later half of the decade, much of the modern infrastructure and utilities for the city were created. In the 1940s, architecture was focused more on decoration and the neoclassical style.

1955 heralded in a new era of architecture with the publication of "On the elimination of excesses in the design," which eventually ended the neoclassical period and integrated the city architecture into modernist, minimalistic Soviet trends. In 1966, a new master plan for the city was created due to the city's rapid growth.

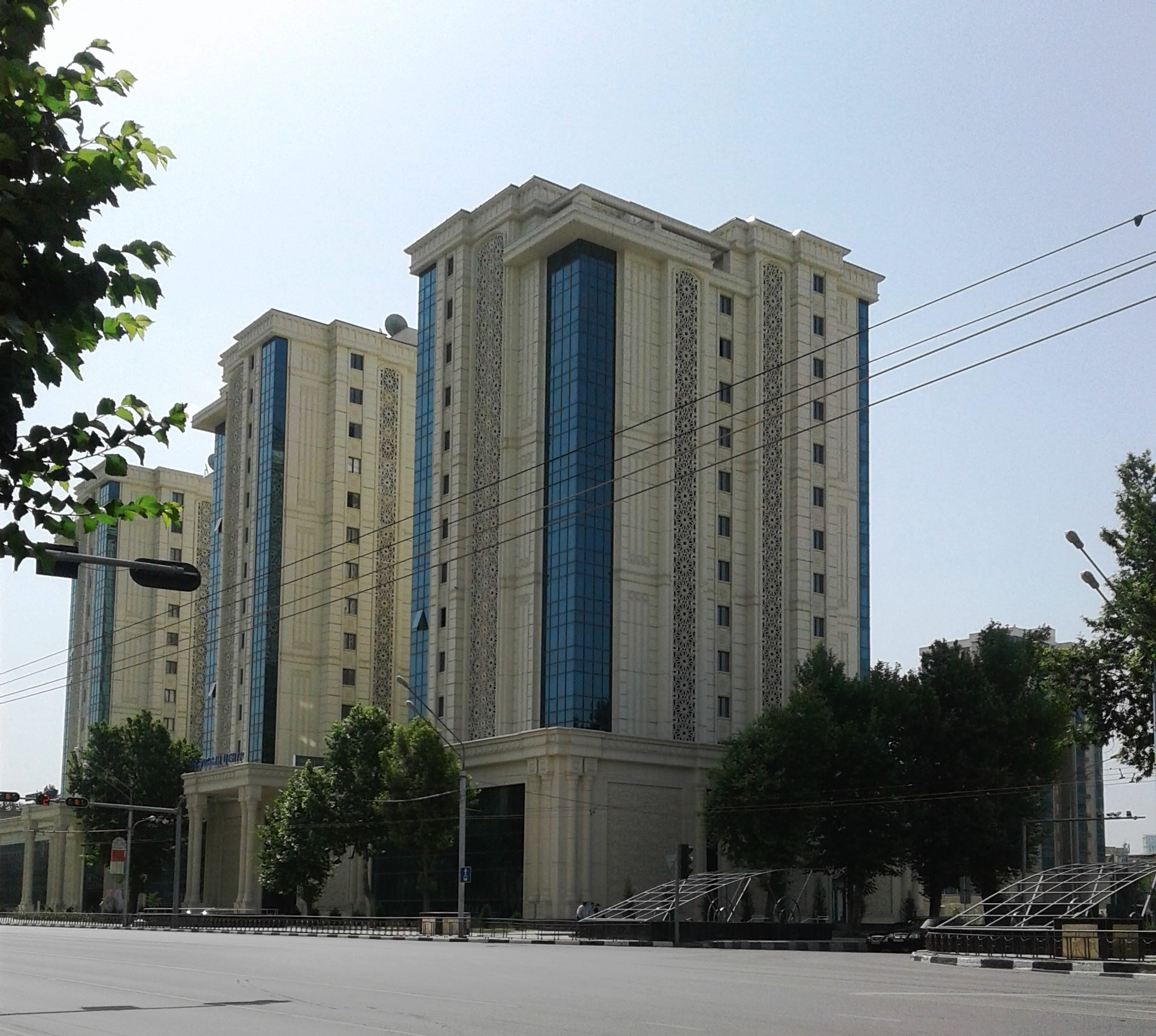
Modern high-rise architecture in Dushanbe

The first skyscraper in Dushanbe, the Hotel Dushanbe, was erected in 1964. High-rise buildings were developed in the mid-70s against the wishes of the Tajik Institute of Earthquake Engineering and Seismology, which viewed such developments as dangerous in an earthquake which they predicted would occur in the near future.

In the 1980s, more technically complex and creative designs were built by a new generation of architects along with more attention on ecological issues. In the late 1990s, more 9-12 story concrete houses were built and private companies grew to 75% of the housing market. Minimalist influences continued to be felt from the 60s up to the 90s.

In the 21st century, new construction projects such as tall skyscrapers, a new parliament building, and the national museum were or are being built. However, the new architectural styles of the modern day resulted in the demolition of many historical, Soviet-era buildings in the center of the city, such as the Central Post Office and the Mayakovsky Theatre, with the exception of a small list of 15 historically significant buildings. The central city mainly consists of wide boulevards and Russian-style buildings today, while suburban areas are comparatively underdeveloped.

=== Electricity ===
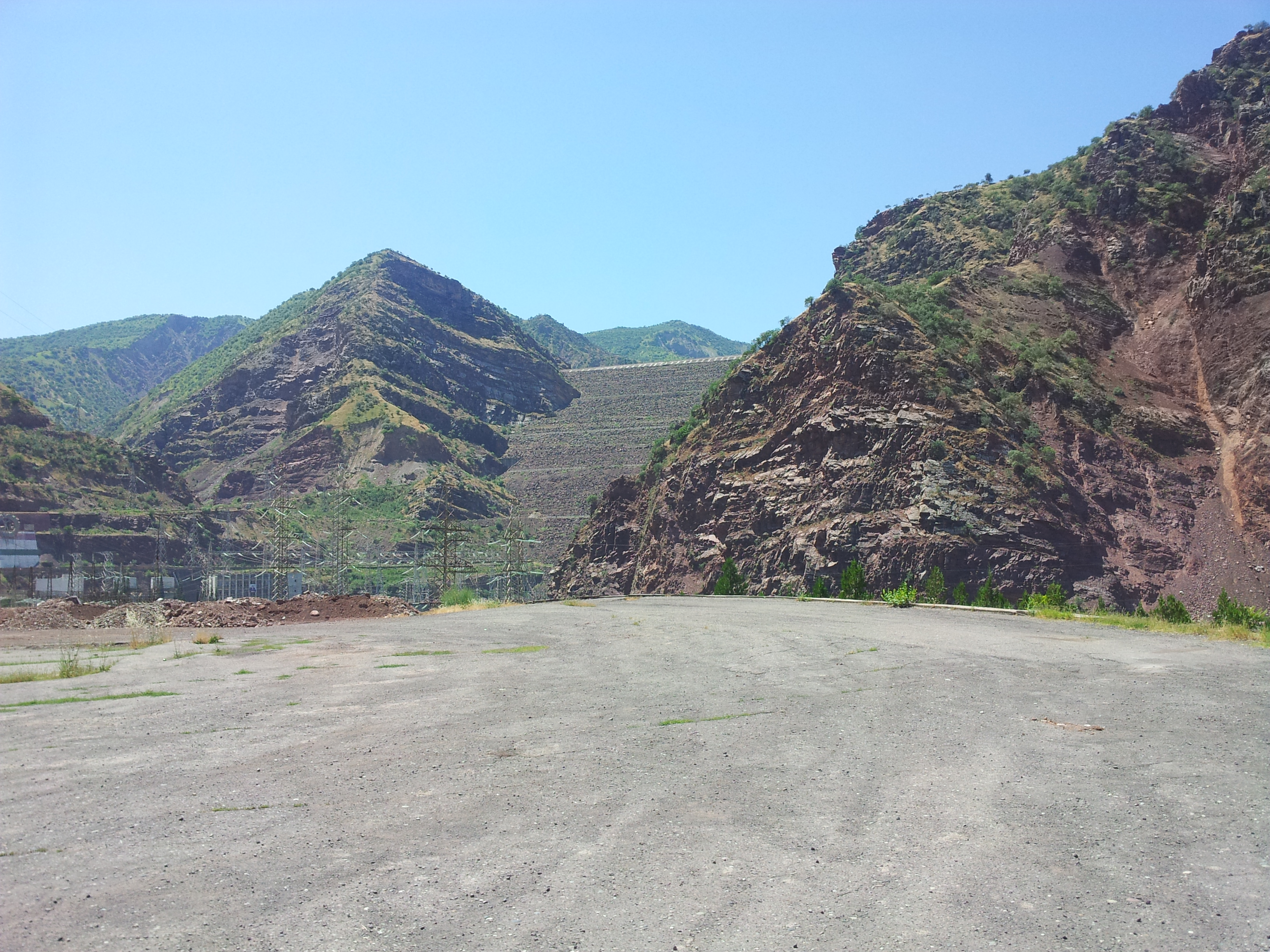
Nurek Dam

In the 1930s, the use of hydroelectricity began to take off in Dushanbe, leading it to be one of the most advanced in terms of energy production in the Soviet Union at the time; today, 96% of Tajikistan's power comes from hydroelectricity. In Dushanbe, 990 million kWh were generated in 1980 which reached 1161 million kWh in 1985 but decreased significantly in 2001.

In 2007, a major energy crisis caused by a cold winter rendered Dushanbe's Soviet-era energy system ineffective and caused a severe crisis due to lack of heating. Since 2007, there have been energy shortages during the winter in Dushanbe. In 2009, Tajikistan's energy trade with other countries was suspended, and in 2012, natural gas imports from Uzbekistan were cut off, which further exacerbated the crisis, although the natural gas imports were restored in 2018. The Nurek hydroelectric dam, as of 2016, provides around 3/4 of the country's power. New hydroelectric plants are being planned and in 2017, the government proclaimed an end to the rolling blackouts; however, in 2020, rolling blackouts continued. Barqi Tojik is the major energy producer for the city and produces 75% of the electricity in the country. To alleviate the energy crisis, a second coal plant for the city is planned with extensive Chinese involvement, but has been criticized for pollution and negative environmental effects.

Varzob's three power plants generated 150 million kWh per year in 2004, and Dushanbe's power supply, built on the idea of a double ring, has an outer ring of power transmission lines from Nurek Dam to Dushanbe to Yovon at a voltage of 220 kW and an inner ring which covers the perimeter of the city and consists of 110 kW power lines.

=== Water and sanitation ===
Tajikistan has the highest average annual precipitation in its region, along with numerous rivers, natural lakes (such as Lake Karakul), and glaciers. Most of the outdated Dushanbe water system was built during the Soviet era in 1932 and not significantly expanded afterwards even with a rising population. The Big Hisar Canal was constructed in 1942 and irrigates much of southern Tajikistan and goes from the Kofarnihon river to the Surxondaryo. As of 2004, the length of the city's water supply network was 476 km (296 mi) and mainly got its water from the Varzob, Kofarnikhon and the South-West. Water is supplied through two ground and two surface water treatment plants. As of 2018, 40% of the city's population did not have access to sewage systems.

=== Parks ===
As of 2020, there are 15 parks in Dushanbe. One of the most well known is Rudaki Park, created in the mid-1930s along with a bronze statue of Lenin. The park was renovated in 2007. Another park is Victory Park, which was created in 1975 to commemorate the Great Patriotic War. The Botanical Garden of the Academy of Sciences of Tajikistan was founded in 1933, and trees planted then are still prominent in the park. In 2007, a collection of folk architecture was added the park.

Parks in Dushanbe

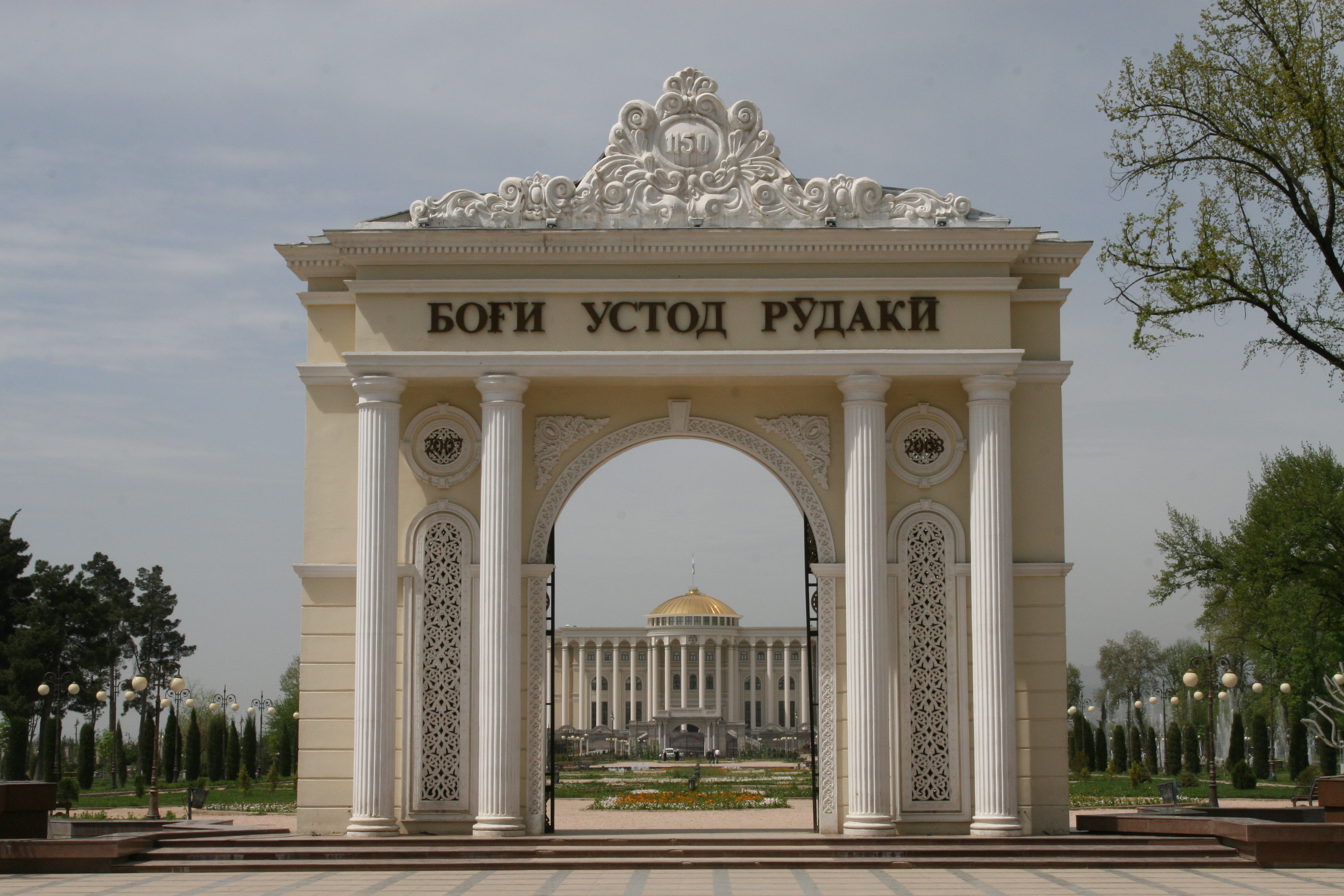
Rudaki Park with the Palace of the Nation in the background.

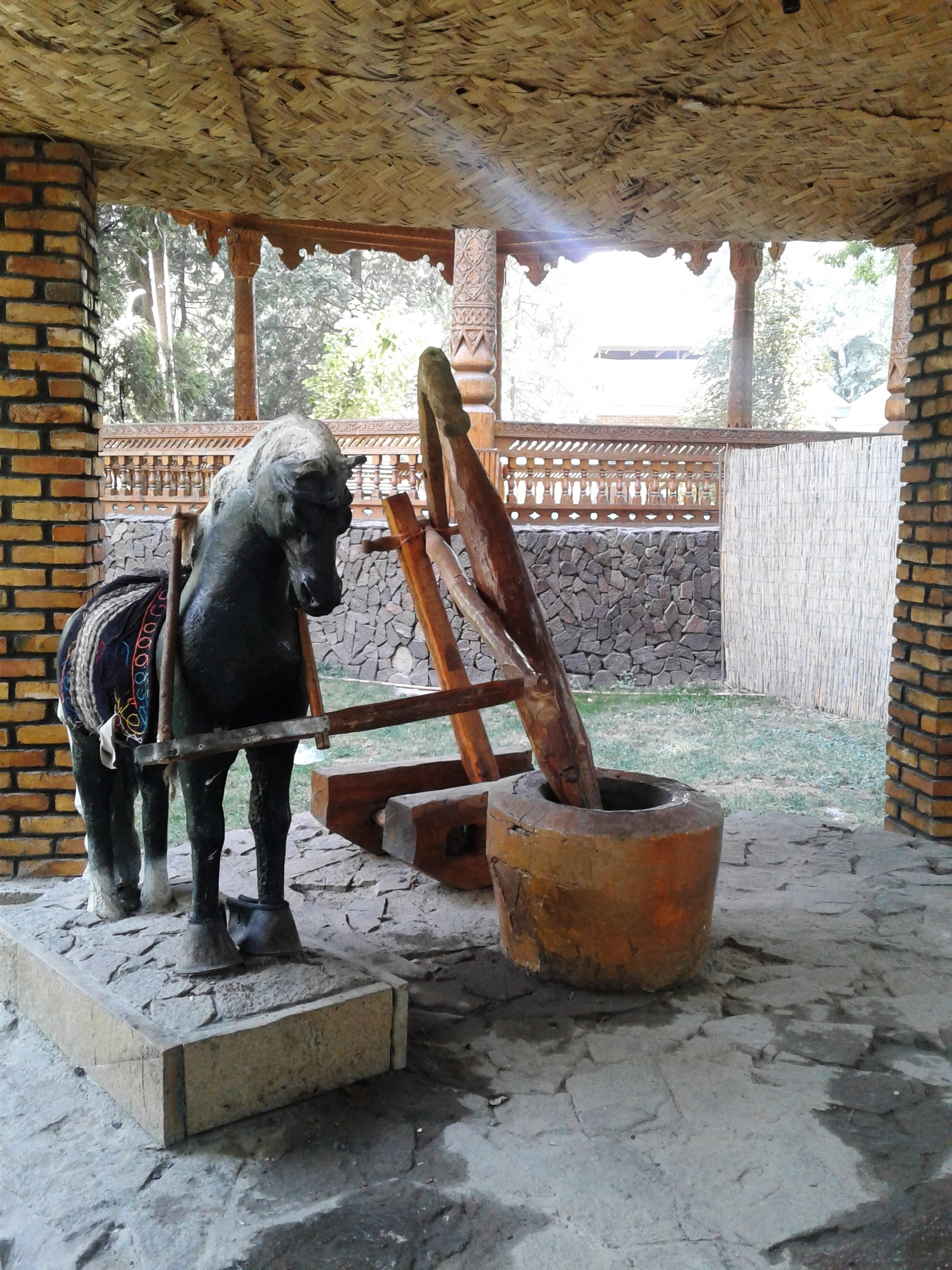
Folk architecture area of the botanical gardens

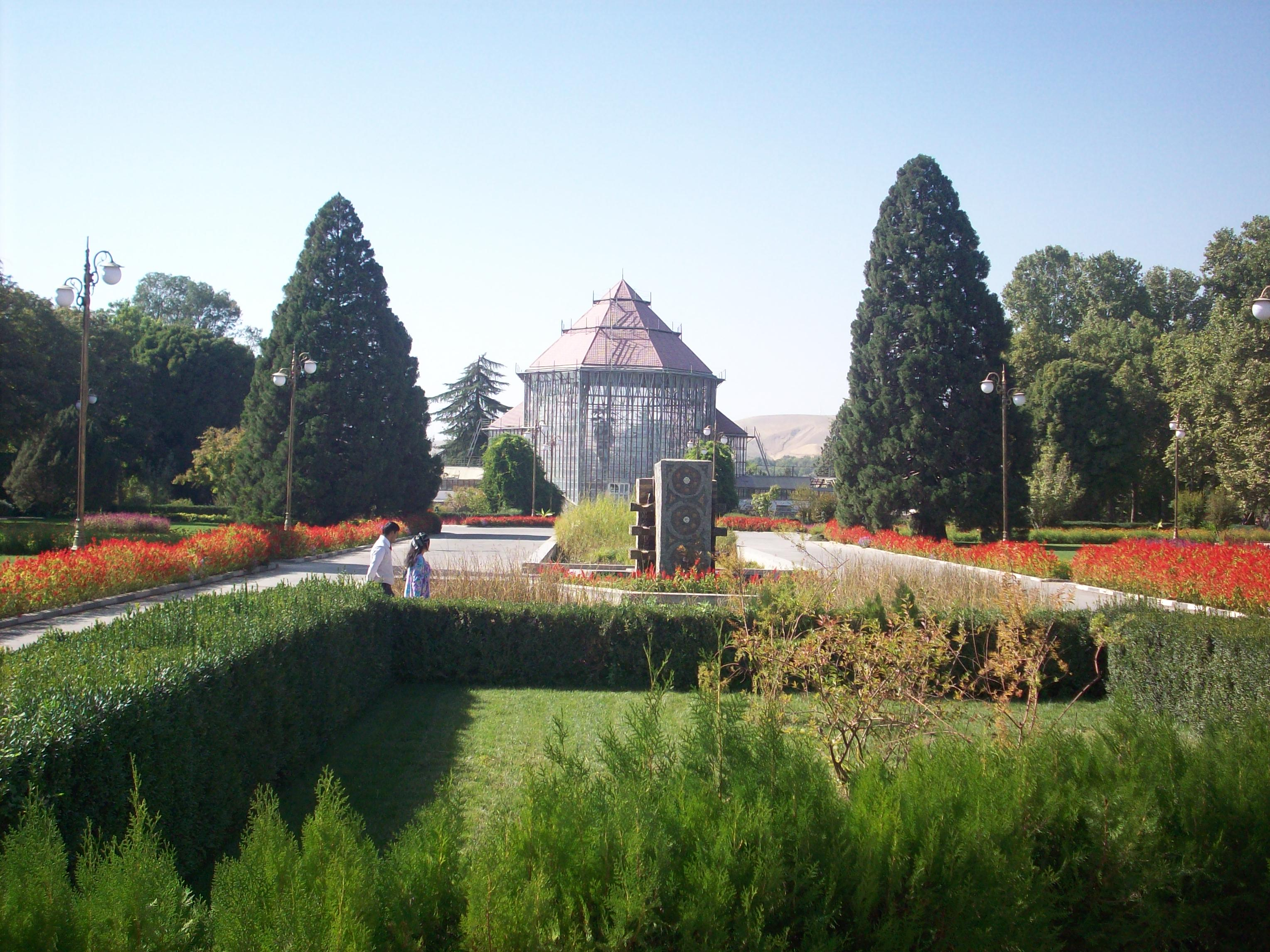
Dushanbe botanical gardens

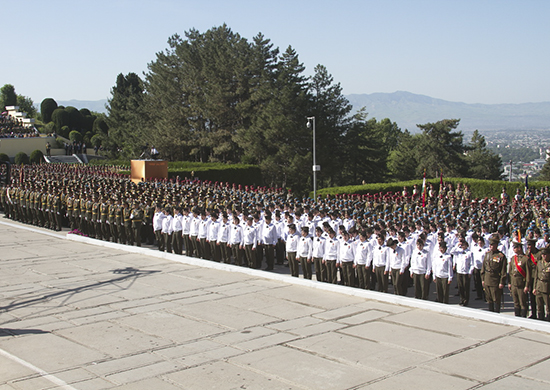
A parade in Victory Park

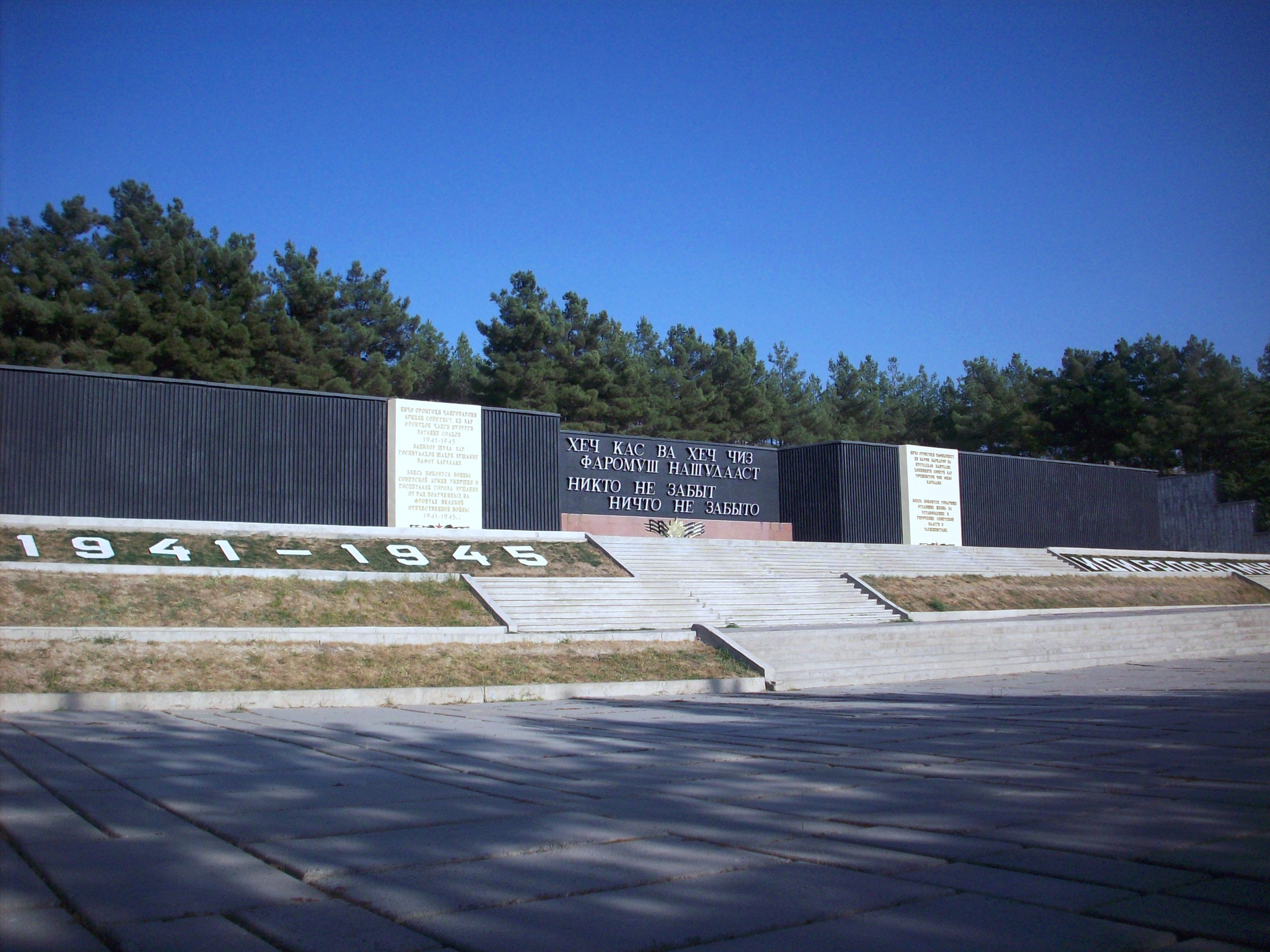
World War 2 memorial in Victory Park

=== Cemeteries ===
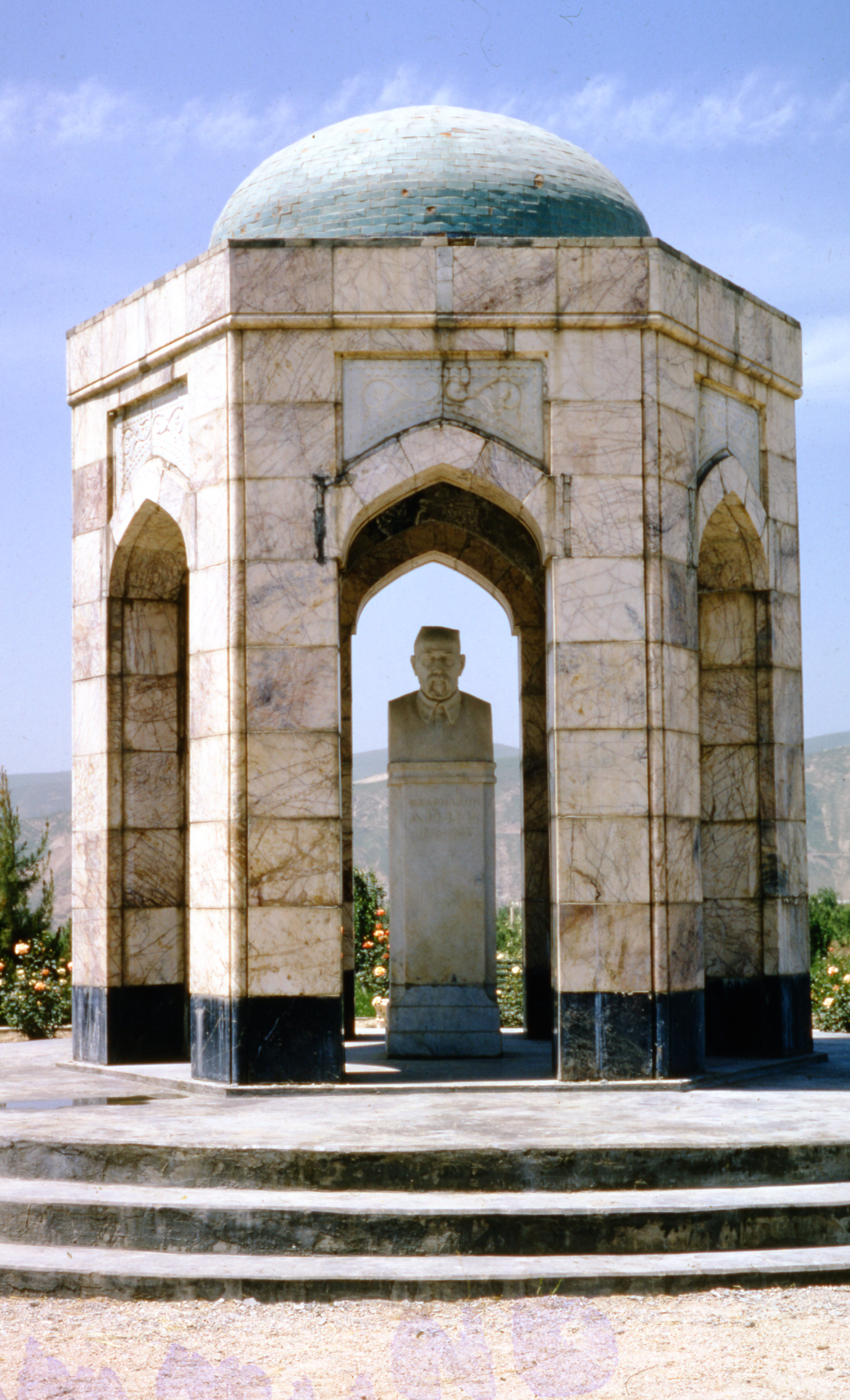
Mausoleum of Sadriddin Ayni

There are 5 main and 14 unrecognized cemeteries in Dushanbe. One of the 5 main ones is Mekhrobod, founded in 2013, that contains 74 hectares of primarily tombstones. For a period of 9 months in 2019, 78 people were buried there. Luchob cemetery, also one of the five, uses commemorative steles to remember the dead and houses more well-known figures. As of October 2019, 54 well-known people were buried there, such as Jabbār Rasulāv, Bobojon Ghafurov, Muhammad Osimi, Mirzo Tursunzade, Lāyiq Shēralī, Muhammadjon Shakuri, Malika Sabirova, Tufa Fozylova, and Mukaddima Ashrafi. It was founded in 1977 and uses the smallest amount of land of the five. In 2017, the government secretly moved many national figures from Aini park to Luchob cemetery, sparking outrage.

Sari Osiyo, founded in 1933, is another one of the five cemeteries. It is one of the oldest in the city and has graves from the late 19th century. For the 9-month period in 2019, 225 were buried here. The Christian cemetery is another one of the five, the least visited although frequented by the 201st Russian division. It uses 84.3 hectares of land and saw 197 new graves over the same nine-month period. Shokhmansur is the last of the five main cemeteries and saw 65 burials over the 9-month period. The Jewish cemetery of the city, one of the fourteen unofficial ones, is looked after by the Congress of Bukharian Jews.

=== Healthcare ===
Istiqlol Medical Complex

In 1925, Dushanbe city hospital and the ambulance system was created, and numerous medical facilities sprung up during the decade. In 1939, an infectious disease hospital was created, and in the same year, the Stalinabad Medical Institute was founded. During World War 2 and up to the Tajik Civil War, the healthcare system significantly expanded through hospitals and specialized clinics.

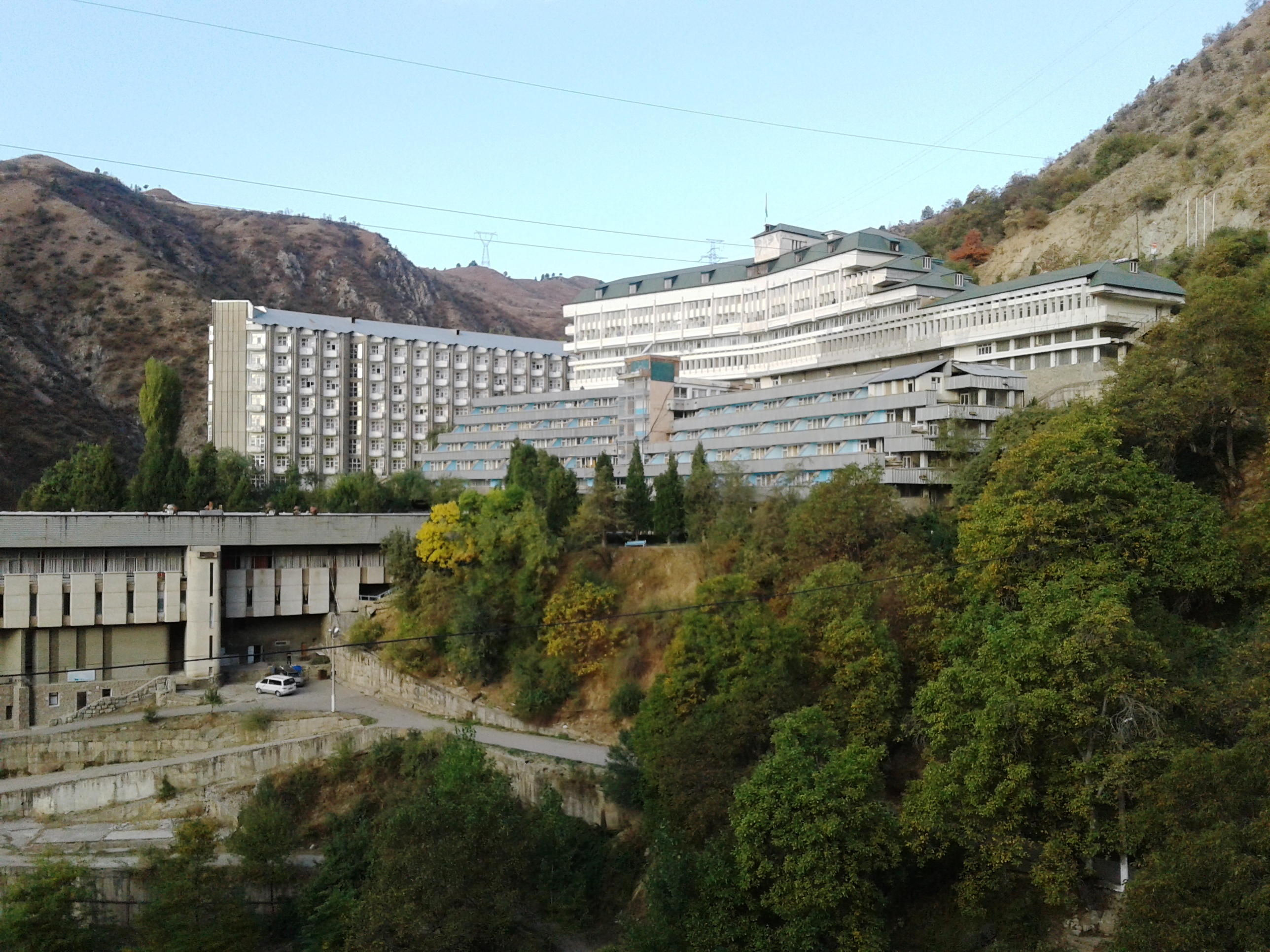
Khoja Obi Garm sanatorium

Tajikistan's health care system is concentrated in Dushanbe. There is a well-developed network of city clinics, hospitals, medical centers, maternity hospitals, orphanages, sanitary and epidemiological centers - a total of 62 medical institutions in the city as of spring 2010. These 62 treatment and prevention facilities include 17 hospitals, 2 orphanages, 14 city health centers, 5 dental clinics, 8 centers of sanitary and epidemiological surveillance and disincentives, 12 city branch centers and 4 support centers. In 2019, the number of hospitals grew to 43. Primary health care for Dushanbe residents (and guests of the city) is provided in 39 institutions (city health centers, dental clinics, centers for sanitary and epidemiological surveillance and de-stations, city branch centers).

Among the main medical institutions of Dushanbe are specialized republican hospitals and centers, city polyclinics No. 1-5, the city infectious diseases hospital, the children's infectious diseases hospital, and the departmental hospitals of the country's power ministries. Citizens receive care through their assigned clinics in the city. Some hospitals in Dushanbe include the Mansurov Clinic, the Tajik Railways Hospital, the Shifobakhsh National Medical Center, and the Istiqlol Medical Complex. Khoja Obi Garm, a Soviet-era sanatorium, still is in operation today and uses radon treatments, among others. Temporary hospitals were established during the COVID-19 pandemic.

== Economy ==
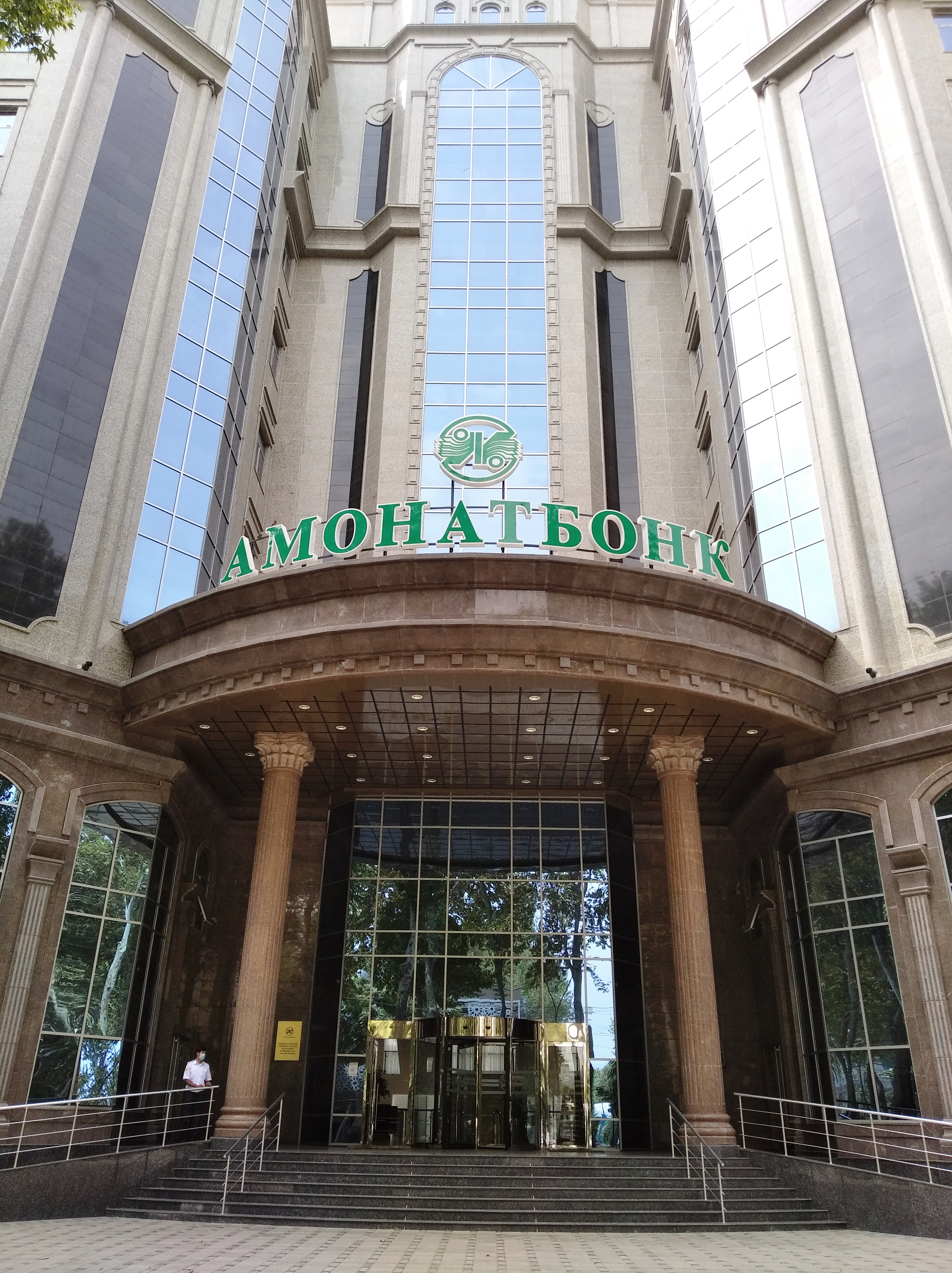
Bank in Dushanbe

In 2018, the gross regional product (GRP) of Dushanbe was 13,808,000,000 somoni, equaling approximately $1,508,900,000, with a growth rate of 7.3%. That comprised 20.1% of the overall GDP of Tajikistan. In the first half of 2020, the GRP of Dushanbe was 20.7% of the GDP of the country. The average salary of the city as of 2014 is 1402.67 somoni, or $147.18. As the center of financial activity of the republic, Dushanbe housed more than 30 commercial banks in 2004.

Dushanbe has extensive international trade. Exports from Dushanbe consisted of $8,343,200 during the first half of 2019, and overall foreign trade turnover was $398,080,900 in 2018. The primary countries Dushanbe exports to are Turkey (42.8% of the total), Iran (28.0%), Russia (10.8%), Afghanistan (7.3%), China (1.2%), Poland (1.2%), and others. For imports, Russia makes up 54.5% of the total, Kazakhstan 13.5%, China 6.8%, Italy 3.4%, Turkey 2.6%, Turkmenistan 2.5%, Ukraine 2.1%, Iran 1.4%, the United Arab Emirates 1.2%, and others make up the rest.

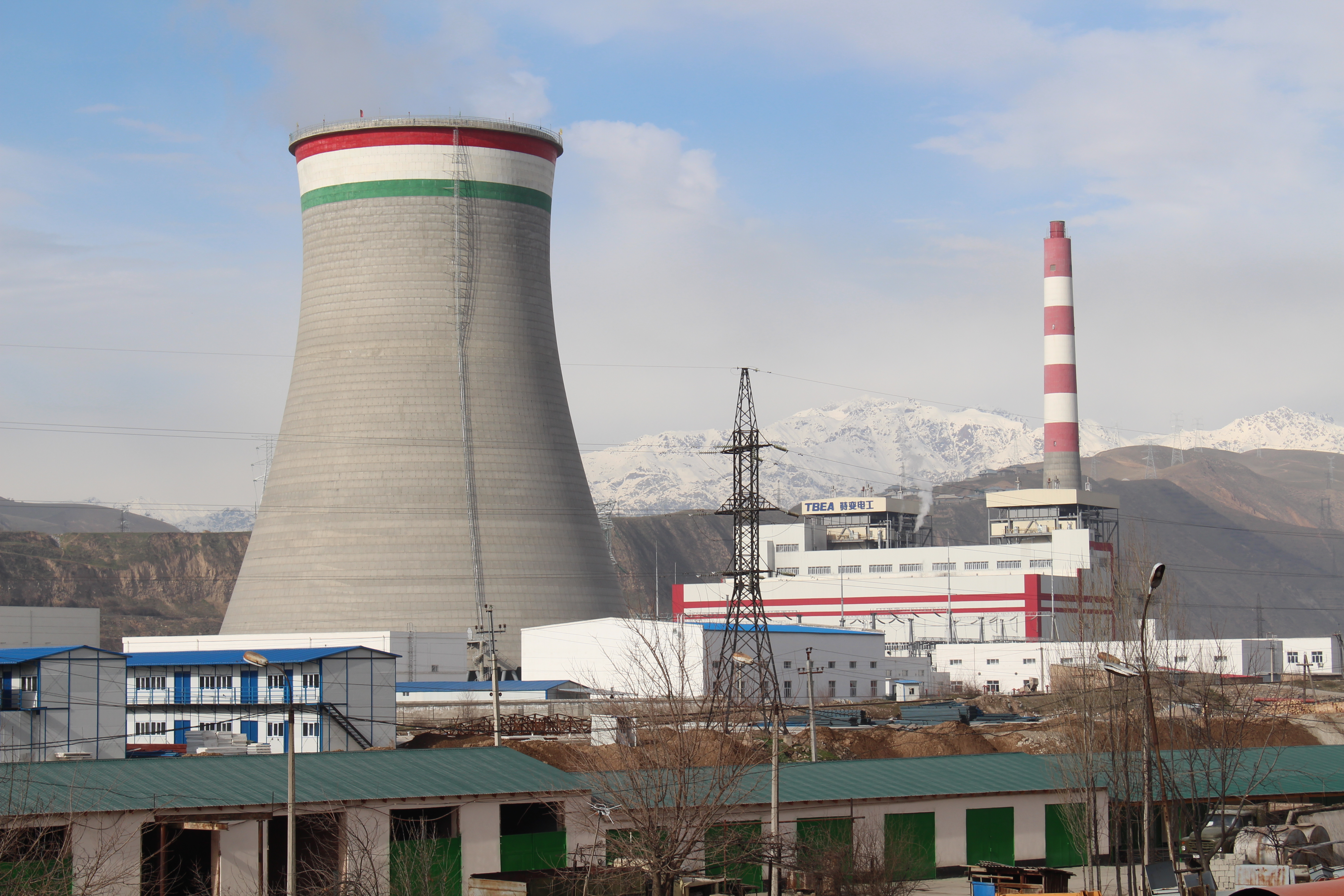
Coal plant in Dushanbe

During and during the decade after the Soviet invasion, most industries were focused on meeting local demand with local materials. Meat packing, soap production, bricks, lumber, silk thread, leather, clothing, and generation of electric power were all local industries during the time period. In 1932, 776 workers were employed in industry, while in 1938, 12 thousand were. During World War 2, the city's industry grew significantly with the Soviet decision to relocate industry eastwards to cities like Dushanbe, specifically light industries like textile manufacturing and food processing. Industry output increased by 2.5 times from 1940 to 1945. About 1/3 of the industrial and white-collar labor force of Tajikistan is located in Dushanbe, despite containing less than 10 percent of Tajikistan's population. From January to August 2019, there were 455 manufacturing companies in Dushanbe, producing 1,644,745,400 Somoni worth of products. The majority of that, 63.9%, was from the processing industry, 34.5% was from electricity, water, gas, and air purification, and the other 1.6% was from the non-metallic construction industry. The industry produces over 300 types of products. Exports from the industrial sector consisted of $1,535,500 during the time period.

The main industrial products exported from the city are cotton yarn, finished cotton fabrics, hosiery, cable products, agricultural products, tobacco products, and trade equipment, among others. Industry, as of 2019, employed 20746 people, with an average salary of 1428.02 somoni. Light industry is the most mature industry in the city, aided by the location of raw materials in the country. Some large companies in light industry are Nassoch, which processes large amounts of cotton fiber, Chevar and Guliston, which both produce garments, and Nafisa, which produces hosiery. The electrical, engineering, and metallurgical industries are also prominent in the republic. Tajiktekstilmash, which produces varied products for agriculture and electricity, and Tajikcable, which produces cables, are two well known companies from that sector of the economy. Somon-Tachkhizot, which produces electronic goods, Torgmash, which produces goods for trading companies, and Valve Plant, which produces iron products are some other prominent companies in the industry. The food processing industry also has a presence in the city with many wineries, dairy and meatpacking plants, canneries, and bakeries all in the city. Various other industries exist in the city as well. These include the building materials industry, which produces cement, oil (with 3 main gas deposits) and plastics; the wood industry; and the printing industry, which consists of 80% of the republic's capacity and began in 1926.

In 2014, the retail sector was involved in 2.6 billion somoni of transactions. In the service sector, hotels, restaurants, canteens and cafes sold services worth 296.6 million somoni. The paid services of the city in 2014 amounted to 5662.2 somoni per capita.

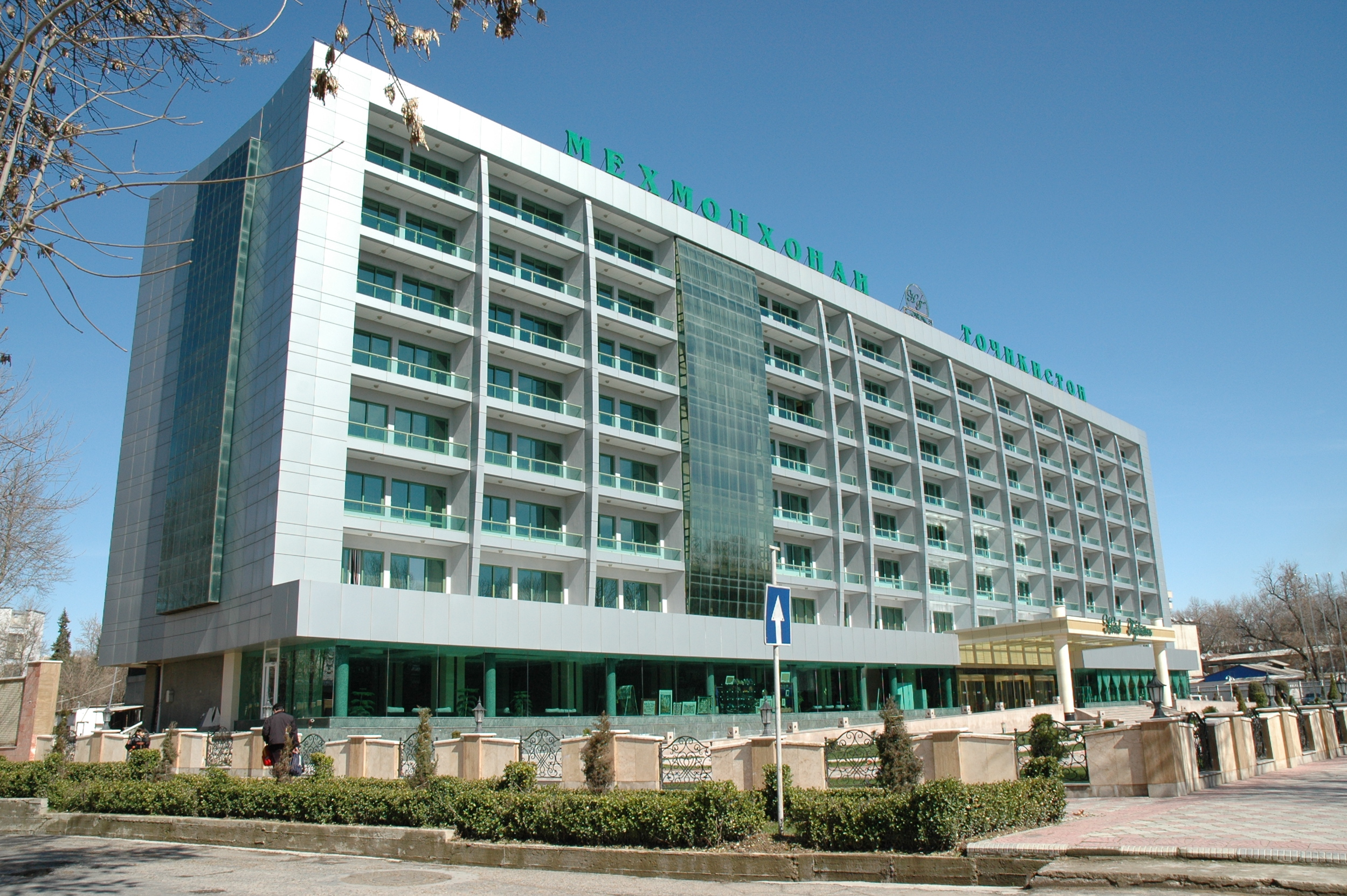
Hotel Tajikistan

Dushanbe is the capital of tourism of the Economic Cooperation Organization and is served by more than 40 hotels. The building of 9 modern hotels, with room for more than 1000 people, is being planned.

In 2018 and 2019, numerous initiatives, such as Dushanbe becoming a member of the World Tourism Cities Federation, different festivals, legislation promoting the city, an art gallery, and the establishment of the Year of Tourism and Folk Crafts in 2018 all served to promote the tourism industry. The Dushanbe Summer Fest, another promoted festival, is notable for its internet connectivity. Compared with the rest of the country, however, Dushanbe is a less popular tourist destination, partially due to its relatively recent founding and lack of historical significance. Museums in the city include the Tajikistan National Museum, founded in 1934, and the Gurminj Museum of Musical Instruments, which contains Pamiri and Badakshani musical instruments.

== Culture ==
Culture in Dushanbe, first developed during the period of Bukharan rule, grew under the Soviet Union, which established many of the first cultural institutions of the city. After independence, Dushanbe's culture went in a more nationalist direction.

=== Performing arts ===
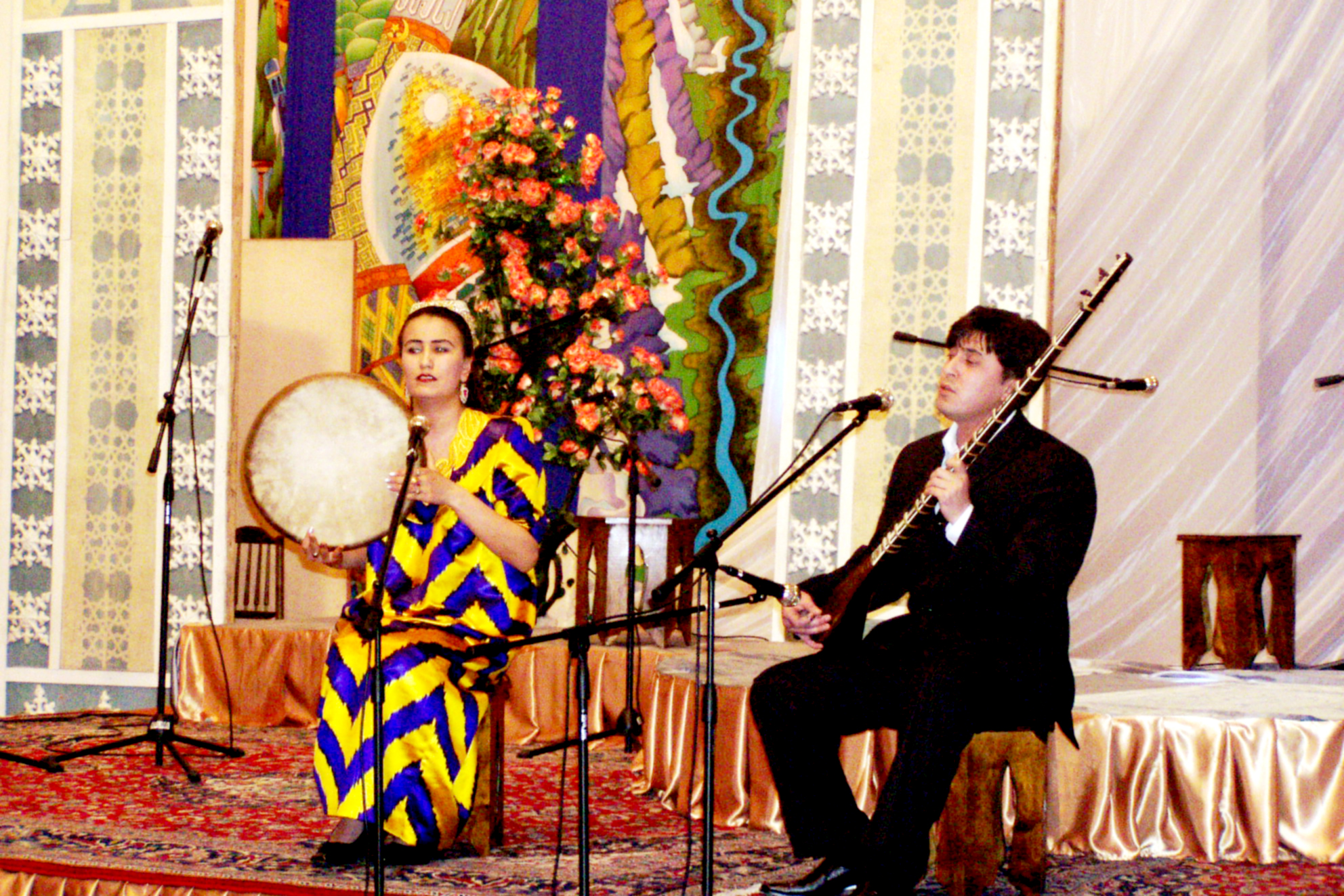
Shashmaqam in the Dushanbe Concert Hall

During the 19th century, shashmaqam was the most prevalent musical genre in Tajikistan. While Soviet authorities labeled it as "music composed for the Emir" and repressed it, in modern times it has gained greater popularity.

During the Soviet period, the Soviet Union encouraged the development of music in Dushanbe, a less culturally crowded place then typical Russian megacities. Revolutionary songs, like the Marseillaise, were promoted and translated into Tajik. The Tajik Philharmonic Society was founded in 1938; today, it is named after Akasharif Juraev. Sergei Artemevich Balasanyan, an Armenian, was a composer who went to Dushanbe in 1936–1943 to prepare the SSR for an upcoming Tajik cultural festival to be held in Moscow. While we was there, he described himself as a "composer, social-musical worker, folklorist, and pedagogue." He also became the head of the Tajik Composer's Union and the artistic lead of the opera house. Large numbers of Russian and Ukrainian symphonies moved to Dushanbe during World War 2.

The Tajik Opera and Ballet Theater, whose building was named after Sadriddin Ayni and was the first opera house in Dushanbe, was founded in 1936. The first opera performed, the first in history of Tajikistan, was The Vose Uprising and depicted a peasants' revolt in eastern Bukhara in the late 19th century. One notable singer of the opera was Hanifa Mavlianova.

Another musician to come to Dushanbe during the Soviet period was Aleksandr Lensky, a Moldovan who came to Tajikistan in 1937. He was the artistic director of the Lahuti Theatre, director of the Tajik Philharmonic, and first secretary of the Tajik Union of Composers. He also composed the first Tajik opera and many orchestral pieces. Another orchestra in Dushanbe is the Opera Orchestra. The State Symphony Orchestra of Tajikistan was founded in 2016, and its first concert took place on 9 September 2016. The Tajik Opera and Ballet Theater continues operating to this day and has won the Order of Lenin. At various times the opera house performed operas on modern, historical, national, revolutionary, and heroic themes.

The Tajik Opera and Ballet Theater also had the first ballet performed in Dushanbe in 1941, entitled Two Roses, and the ballet troupe gradually grew over time. The troupe was improved with graduates from the Leningrad Choreographic School with ballet dancers such as Malika Sabirova. The theater was refitted in 2009 and continues operating to this day.

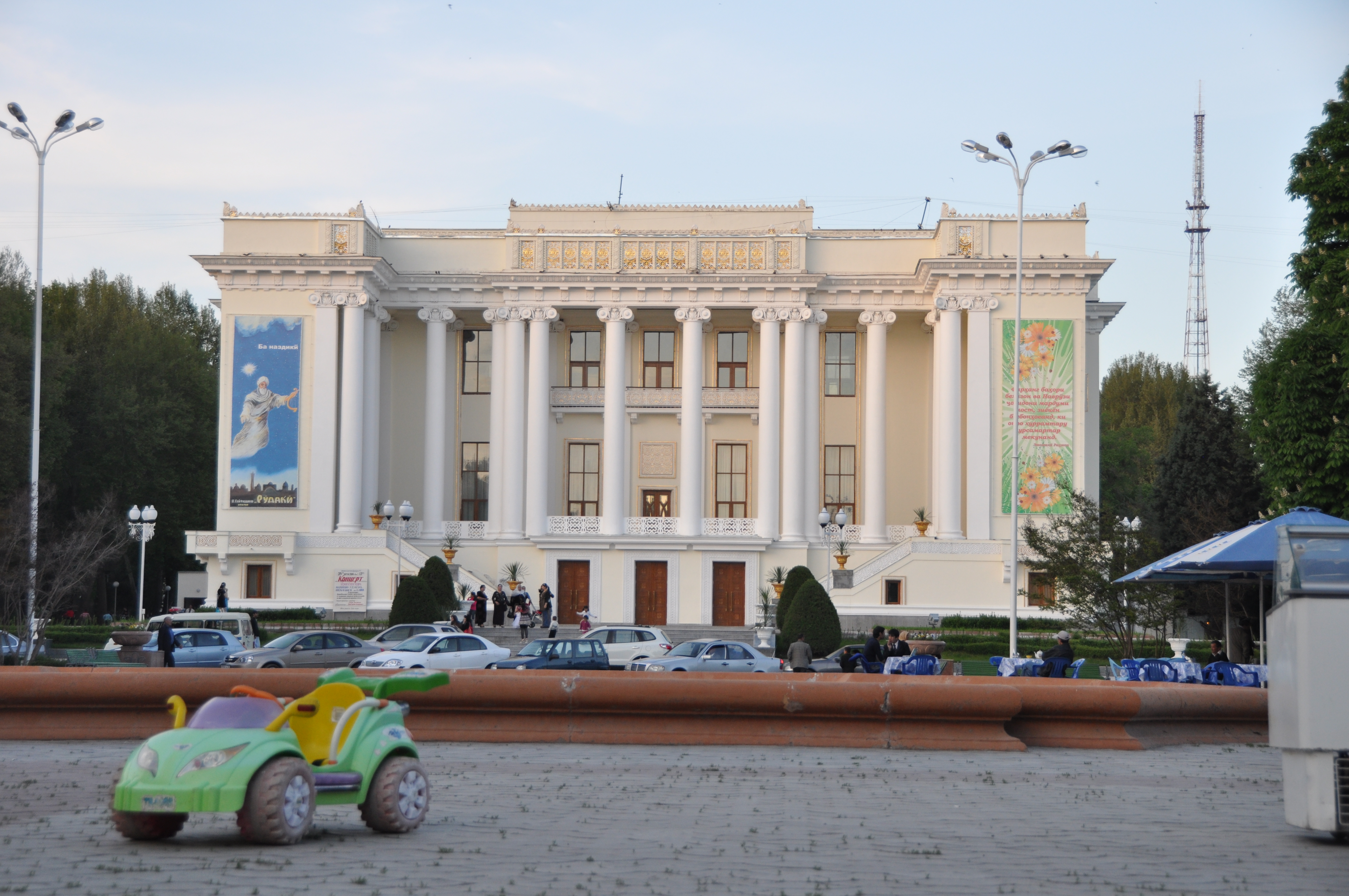
Ayni Opera theater

The 1920s saw the birth of drama in the city. The first, Lahouti theater, was built in 1929. In the 1930s, Soviet themes like class struggle, fighting against the past, and gender equality were prominent in plays. In 1935, the Tajik Musical Theater, now the Ayni theater, was built. A comedy troupe was created in 1944 and after the war young artists influenced plays in Dushanbe, influencing the creation of the Tajik State Youth Theater.

Continuing with a nationalist tradition, Tajik classics were made into plays. During World War 2, plays were focused on the war and historical themes from the 1950s onward. In the 70s and 80s foreign plays, like Oedipus Rex, were introduced to Dushanbe. After independence, plays focused primarily on the devastating civil war. Today, some theaters are the Tajik Academic Opera and Ballet Theater, the State Russian Drama Theater, the youth theater, the State Experimental Theater, and the republican puppet theater.

The Mayakovsky Theatre was Tajikistan's oldest theatre and last surviving Russian-language theatre company; it was demolished in 2016 as part of the government's wholesale destruction of numerous 20th-century buildings of historical and architectural interest.

=== Literature ===
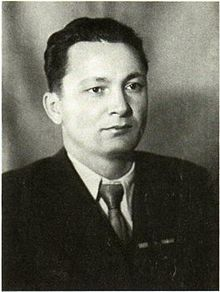
Mirsaid Mirshakar

The first printing press in Tajikistan was created in August 1924. The Tajik State Publishing House, the Donish Publishing House, was founded in 1944. In 1925, 4 books were printed, which grew to 13 in 1926. In 1930, Sadriddin Ayni wrote the first Tajik novel, Dokhunda. Publishing houses established in 1934 and the Academy of Sciences of Tajikistan publishing house dramatically increased book production in the city. The Maorif Publishing House was created in 1975. In 2004, there were 30 publishing companies in the city.

Dushanbe became the center of Tajik literature in the 1920s with figures such as Sadriddin Ayni, Abolqasem Lahouti, and Payrav Sulaymoni along with new Soviet literature calling for revolution and social equality and Tajik nationalist literature. Children's books and translated works also had their beginnings in this period. In the 1930s, young Russian writers influenced the literature of the city, part of the "Komsomol generation." The themes often touched on the rapid development of Dushanbe during the 30s.

During World War 2, literature shifted towards patriotic and militaristic themes of protecting the motherland in shorter formats than novels. Messages from the frontlines and satires became popular. Russian literature also became known, partially due to the movement of factories and people from the frontlines of the war to the east. After the war, prose works and poetry, with poets like Mirzo Tursunzoda, became more popular along with the continuation of genres from previous decades. Literary criticism developed along with analysis of individual writers.

From the 1950s, the historical revolutionary genre developed, prompting authors to use history for inspiration. In the 60s the new genre of science fiction began in the city with writers like Mirsaid Mirshakar. In the 70s and 80s the themes of disorder gained more prominence, not coincidentally soon before the Soviet Union's collapse. In poetry, civic and philosophical lyrical themes were most popular. After independence, previously forbidden subjects like religion started to appear in literature, along with reflections on the civil war and a more international scene has developed in the city.

=== Visual arts ===
Sculpture was first introduced to Dushanbe in the 1920s and throughout the Soviet period was focused on combining modern culture and a classical heritage. Modern sculpture mainly has historical subjects like Firdavsi, Shah Anushirvan, or Ismail Samani, often to commemorate Tajik nationhood and ethnicity by looking to past Achaemenid and Samanid figures.

Statues in Dushanbe

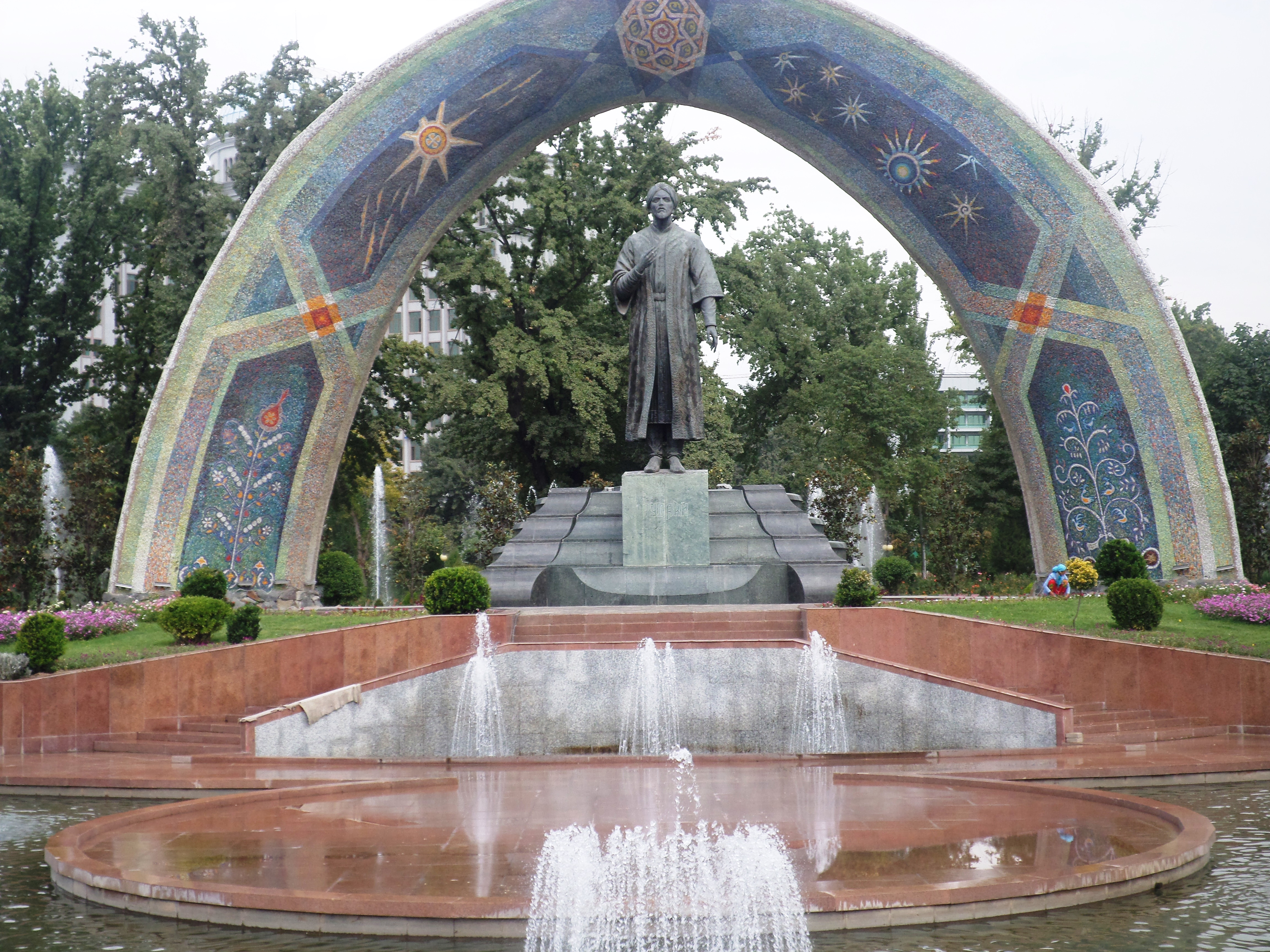
Statue of Rudaki

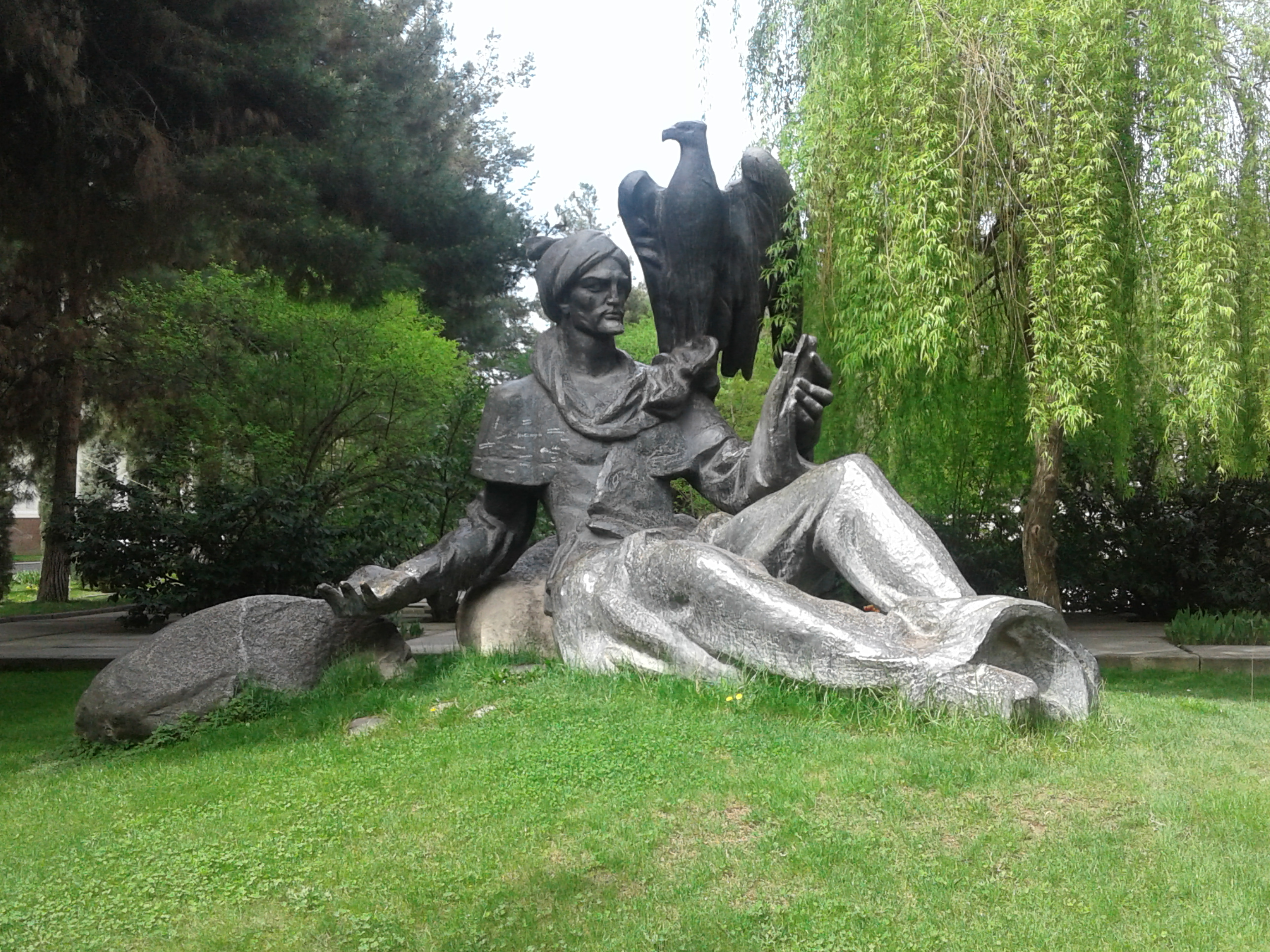
Statue of Omar Khayyam

Statue of Lenin

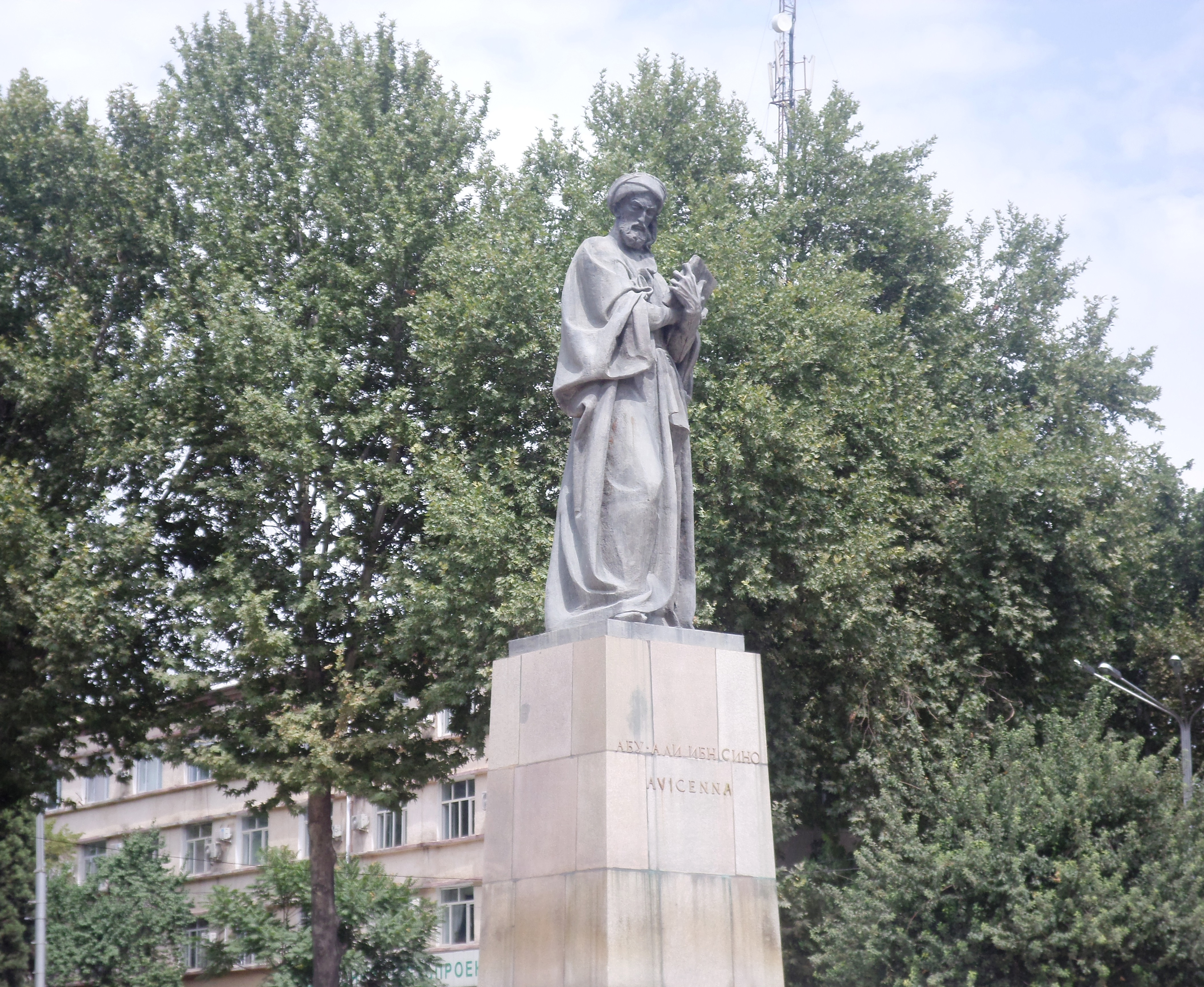
Statue of Avicenna

Painting in Dushanbe took off when Russian painters moved to this city in the 20s and 30s. By the 50s, Tajik artists started to paint. In the 1960s, the severe style [ru] grew and in the 70s and 80s a focus on Tajik heritage and nationalism was predominant. In the late 80s, however, painting shifted from a focus on historical figures to emotional depth and personality. During the civil war, a theme of conflict in painting developed. Sabzali Sharipov's black and white series, for example, was devoted to the civil war.

=== Film ===
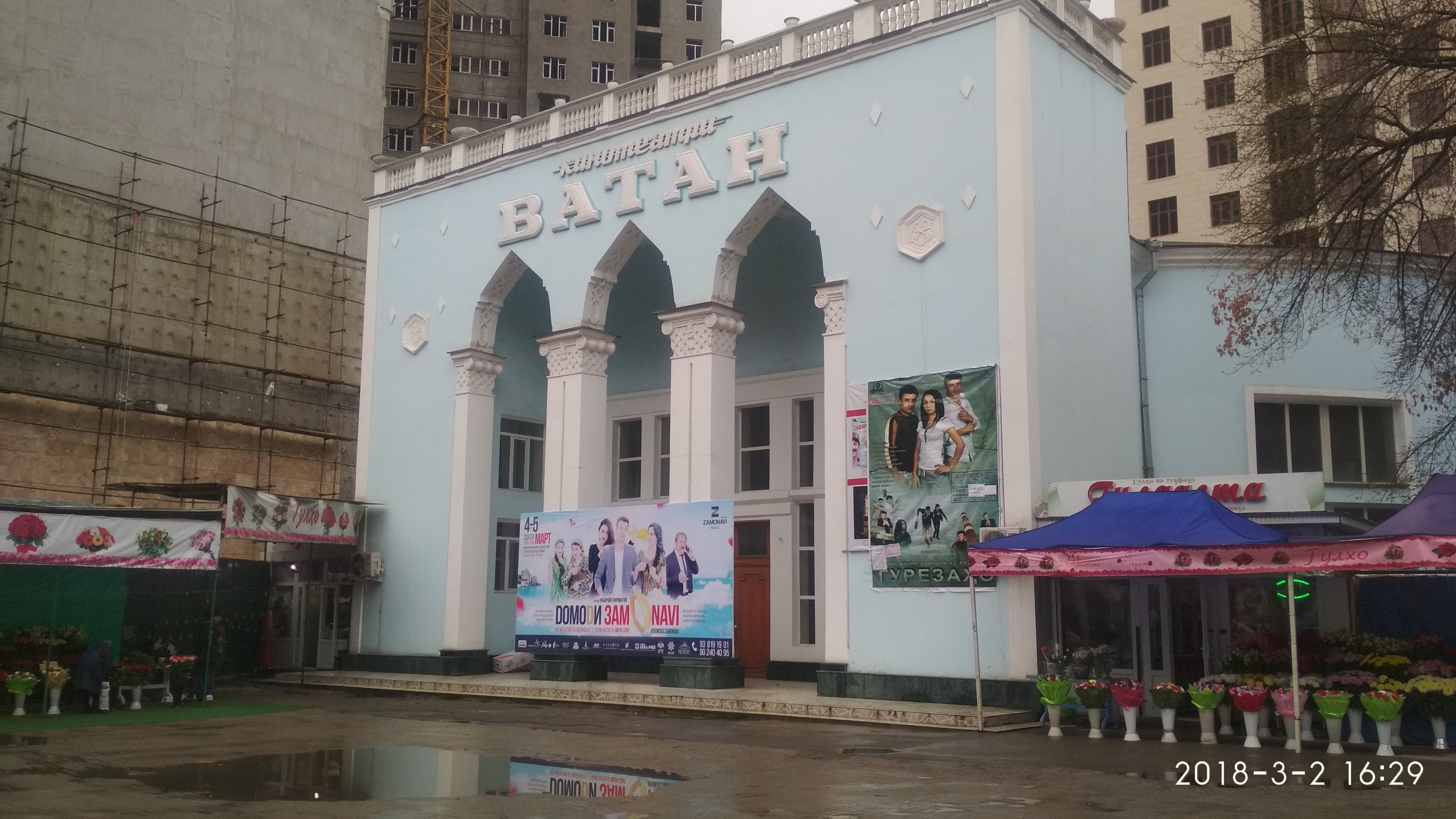
Movie theater

Cinema in Dushanbe started in the 1930s with the creation of film studios and cinemas by the Soviet government, although the first cinema was created in 1927 where residents watched Nibelung by Frits Lang. Komil Yarmatov was the first prominent Tajik film director. Documentaries were also popular in this period, and the first feature film appeared in 1938. In World War 2, feature film production in Dushanbe was suspended due to lack of supplies. After the war, more feature films were developed, with many movies attempting to create a portrait of the city. In the 1980s a new generation of filmmakers brought new values such a pluralism into the theater, which led to some films focusing on the truth of Soviet history. During the civil war, the landscape changed dramatically. Tajikfilm, which formerly had a monopoly on filmmaking, had to shut down, while independent filmmakers chronicled the horrors of the civil war.

=== Sports ===
Gymnastics, equestrian sports and athletics were practiced in 1923 at the Dushanbe sports club and in 1929 tennis was introduced. The All-Tajik Spartakiad was first held in 1934, and in 1939 Dynamo Dushanbe won the quarterfinals of the Cup of the USSR. In 1950 the country's soccer team took first place in the Central Asian Games.

In 2003, Dushanbe hosted the Central Asian Games. The most popular sports in Dushanbe are sambo, wrestling, judo, karate, taekwondo, artistic gymnastics, weightlifting, archery, shooting, boxing, football, basketball, diving, tennis, chess, Buzkashi, and checkers. Four soccer teams of the Tajikistan Higher League play in Dushanbe: CSKA Pamir, Dushanbe-83, Istiklol, and Lokomotiv-Pamir. The Pamir Stadium in Dushanbe was constructed in 1939 where CSKA Pamir Dushanbe played.

On 21 August 2026, the National Stadium was officially opened in Dushanbe. Built to FIFA Category 2 standards, the 33-metre-tall (108 ft) two-tiered arena has a seating capacity of over 30,000 and features a standard 105 by 68 metres (115 yd × 74 yd) football pitch.

== Media ==
=== Newspapers and magazines ===
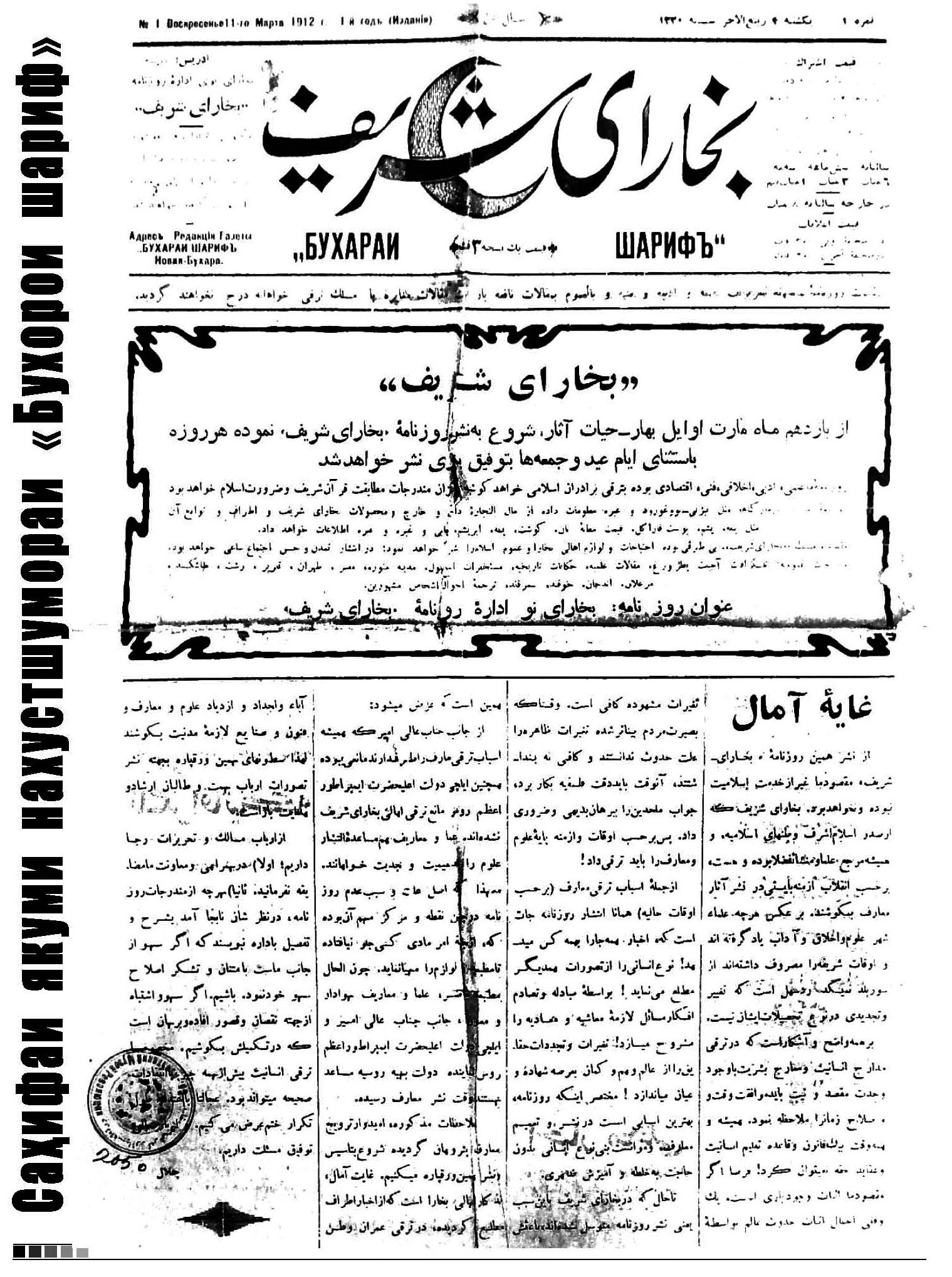
The front page of the first issue of Bukhara Sharif newspaper

The first newspaper published in Tajik was Bukhara Sharif in Kagan on 11 March 1912 and published by leaders of the Jadid movement like Mirzo Jalol Yusufzoda. The purpose of the newspaper was to "be a scientific, literary, directional, subject, and economic publication that will strive for the spread of civilization and the idea." Soon after, however, Ivan Petrov requested that the Emir of Bukhara close the paper, which he did on 2 January 1913.

Oina and Mullo Nasreddin were two of the earliest Tajik language magazines. The Zvezda Vostok magazine was published in Tajik in the early 1920s in support of the October Revolution. The first Soviet newspaper distributed in Tajikistan was Shulai Inkilob (Flame of the Revolution) as propaganda for the Soviet government in 1919. It was distributed throughout Tajikistan and was the main Tajik language newspaper that opposed the previous Emirate and was clearly in support of communism, the October Revolution, and the Bukharan Communist Party.

The first Soviet newspaper published in Tajikistan was Po basmachi which detailed the conditions of the Red Army in Tajikistan in 1923 during the Basmachi movement. In 1924, the newspaper Voice of the East (Russian: Овози шарк or Голос Востока), the first Soviet government newspaper was published in Dushanbe and was a forum for much of the poetry and literature of the young republic. In 1925, the official newspaper of Soviet Tajikistan was "Bedorii tochik" (Awakening of the Tajiks). An Uzbek-language paper, Red Tajikistan, was published in Tajikistan as well. Sadriddin Ayni also published many newspapers such as Bukhara News, Horpustak, and Flame of the Revolution.

In 1929, the newspaper Red Tajikistan came into print with a large daily circulation of 5000. In the 1930s Komsomolets Tadzhikistana was published as a communist paper intended for the youth of Tajikistan. Many other newspapers were published during this time as well. The press often emphasized the collective farming system and the newspaper Dehkoni Kambagal was popular among farmers.

During World War 2 newspaper production was strained as raw materials became increasingly scarce and their numbers were reduced. After the war, the many newspapers from the 30s began to be produced once again. In the 60s and 70s the newspaper Communist of Tajikistan gained prominence, winning the Order of the Red Banner of Labor. International cooperation was to be emphasized during the time period.

During perestroika, newspapers embraced more liberal and democratic ideas. One of the first to do this was the Komsomol of Tajikistan. Farkhang, a new literary magazine, published national Tajik and Islamic literature banned before such as the Masnavi. The Sukhan newspaper, published by the Union of Journalists of Tajikistan, was a leading voice for liberalism and perestroika in the republic, writing about topics such as freedom of speech, democratization, and the opposition. The first publication not released by the state was from Rastokhez, printed in Lithuania and delivered to Dushanbe. The Democratic Party of Tajikistan published a paper, Justice, in Dushanbe as well which had a circulation of 25000. Charogi Ruz, or Light of Day, was the first private publication in Dushanbe, and advertised itself as the free tribune for youth. Free publications such as Oinai zindagi (by trade unions), Somon, Haftgandzh, and others formed. Today, Charogi Ruz is known for its criticism of the ruling government.

In August 1999 there were officially 199 newspapers, although only 17 of those appeared regularly. Some of the most widely circulated national government publications are Dzhumhuriet and Narodna Gazeta. In addition to the state news agency Khovar (News), there are several private newspapers, including Asia-Plus, which regularly publishes in Russian and English and reports on political, social and economic issues, Jumhuriyat, and Khalk ovozi. In 2019 there were 37 regular newspapers and 37 magazines published in the city.

=== Radio ===
In 1924 a radio station was built in Dushanbe for military communication. On 10 April 1930 the first radio broadcast was heard by civilians in Tajikistan, from Moscow. It functioned as a news source and a source of Soviet propaganda. The first station, in Dushanbe, mainly focused on retransmitted broadcasts from Moscow and radios gradually became more prevalent in the country. While development slowed during World War 2, afterwards Tajikistan received higher broadband and quality radio stations and broadcasts.

In 1977, locally created radio broadcasts were able to be transmitted from Dushanbe thanks to the construction of the Radio House in the city. In 2000, the Sadoi Dushanbe Radio was created, and today that is one of the four programs broadcast in Dushanbe.

As of August 1999 government radio is broadcast throughout the nation along with independent outlets such as Asia Plus radio. Radio Liberty, the BBC, and Sadoi Khuroson are also broadcast in Tajik, although no independent radio stations were in operation.

=== Television ===
On 7 November 1959 the first television center was created in the republic, the Tajik Television Studio. In 1967 programs from Moscow and Tashkent were broadcast in the country and on 15 November 1975 color television was introduced. As of August 1999 12 to 15 stations broadcast consistently. Many Russian language channels like ORT, RTR, and TV-6 broadcast as well. Today, a greater number of private television stations operate in the city, with 15 in the whole country, although there are still 7 state owned channels.

== Notable people ==
- Zebo Aminzoda (born 1948), Tajikistani ballet dancer and choreographer
- Viktor Bout (born 1967), Russian convicted arms dealer
- Rukhshona Khakimova (born 1992), Tajikistani journalist
- Vazgen Manasyan (1958–2024), Tajikistani professional football coach and player of Armenian descent
- Farruh Negmat-Zadeh (born 1959), Tajikistani artist
- Zoya Tajikova (born 1935), Tajik musicologist
- Manizha (born 1991) She represented Russia in the Eurovision Song Contest 2021.

== International relations ==
=== Twin towns – sister cities ===
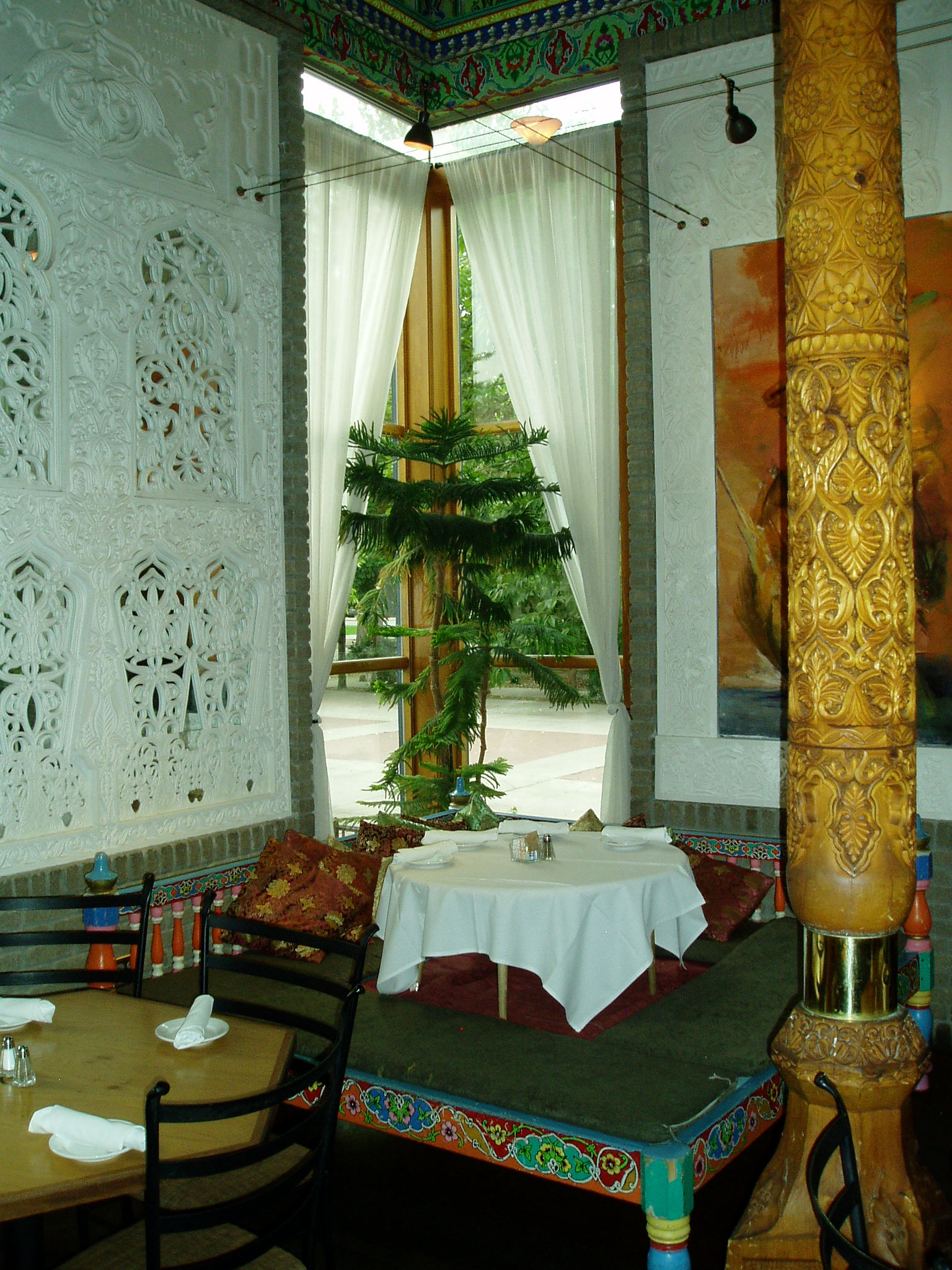
Interior of the Boulder Dushanbe teahouse

Dushanbe is twinned with:

- Ankara, Turkey
- Ashgabat, Turkmenistan
- Astana, Kazakhstan
- Baku, Azerbaijan
- Boulder, United States
- Doha, Qatar
- Hainan, China
- Islamabad, Pakistan
- Klagenfurt, Austria
- Lahore, Pakistan
- Lusaka, Zambia
- Mazar-i-Sharif, Afghanistan
- Minsk, Belarus
- Monastir, Tunisia
- Qingdao, China
- Reutlingen, Germany
- Saint Petersburg, Russia
- Sanaa, Yemen
- Shiraz, Iran
- Tehran, Iran
- Ürümqi, China
- Xiamen, China

In 1982, Mary Hey and Sophia Stoller started an initiative to make Dushanbe a sister city of Boulder even though during that time they were on opposite sides of the Cold War. In 1987, the mayor of Dushanbe, Maksud Ikramov, officially made Boulder a sister city of Dushanbe. Exchange students, tourism, and art exchanges began between the two cities. The Tajik Teahouse was sent from Dushanbe to Boulder in 1990. During the civil war, Boulder sent humanitarian aid to Dushanbe.

=== International conferences ===
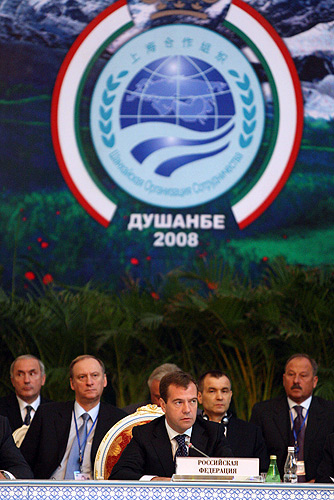
2008 Shanghai Coordination Council meeting.

Many international conferences have been held in Dushanbe, such as the International Conference on Integrated TB Control in Central Asia and the hosting of the Shanghai Cooperation Organization conference in 2000, 2008, and 2014.

In 2003, Dushanbe hosted the International Forum on Fresh Water which was attended by 50 states and organizations.

From 20 to 23 June 2018 the High-Level International Conference on the International Decade for Action 'Water for Sustainable Development' was held in Dushanbe, which discussed the upcoming decade for action with regards to water. A second conference on the same subject was planned to be held in June 2020.

On 16–17 May 2019 a high-level conference entitled "Countering Terrorism and its Financing Through Illicit Drug Trafficking and Organized Crime" was held in Dushanbe and attended by more than 50 countries. It passed the Dushanbe declaration, which put the primary responsibility for fighting terrorism onto national governments. Other topics, such as drug smuggling, were also discussed.

On 15 June 2019 the fifth summit of the Conference on Interaction and Confidence-Building Measures in Asia was held in Dushanbe. The Asian members of the organization discussed common interests on topics such as peace and security, terrorism, arms control, the Iran nuclear deal, poverty, economic development, and globalization.

== See also ==
- List of cities in Tajikistan
- List of squares in Dushanbe
