= Forests of Azerbaijan =

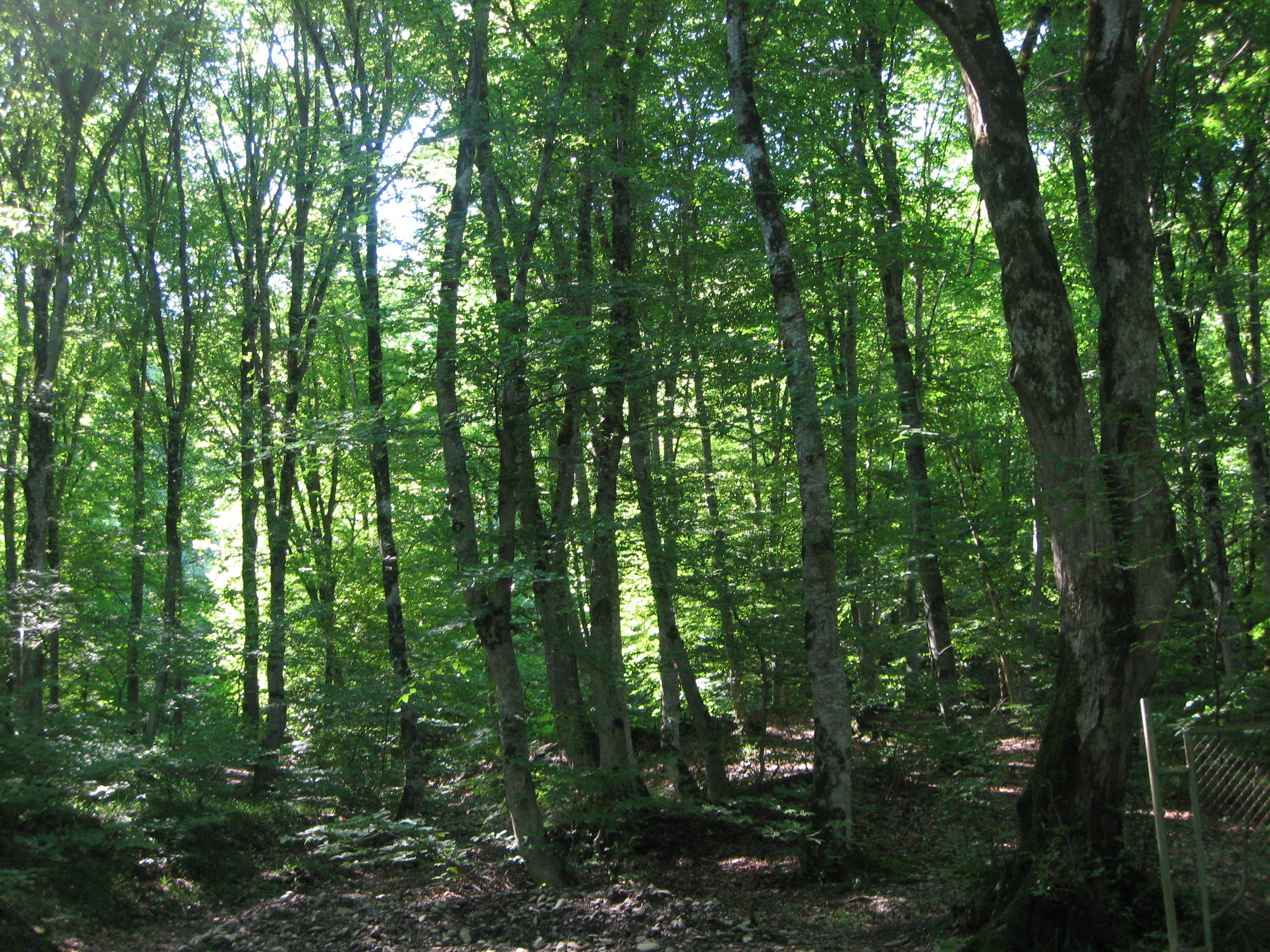
Caucasus mixed forest in the Quba District

The total forest area of Azerbaijan is 1,021,880 ha or 11.8% of the country's area. The forest biomes consist of temperate deciduous forests, temperate broadleaf and mixed forests, temperate coniferous forests and riparian forests. Specialists estimate that in the 8th-9th centuries the forest cover was around 30-35%, most of it situated in mountainous areas.

While as a whole, Azerbaijan is a country with modest forest cover, the forest cover is unevenly spread across the country. In the low-lying areas, the forest cover is very sparse, also due to the fact that the precipitation is too low for trees and forests to grow in most of these areas; whereas in many mountainous areas, the forest cover is much greater especially in wetter areas.

49% of the country's forests are located in the Greater Caucasus Mountains, 34% in the Lesser Caucasus Mountains, 15% in the Talysh Mountains-Lankaran Lowland region, 2% in the Kur-Araz Lowland, and 0.5% in the Nakhchivan Autonomous Republic.

The forests are classified into two major ecoregions in Azerbaijan: the Caucasus mixed forests of the Greater Caucasus Mountains and the Lesser Caucasus Mountains, and the Caspian Hyrcanian mixed forests of the Talysh Mountains-Lankaran Lowland region.

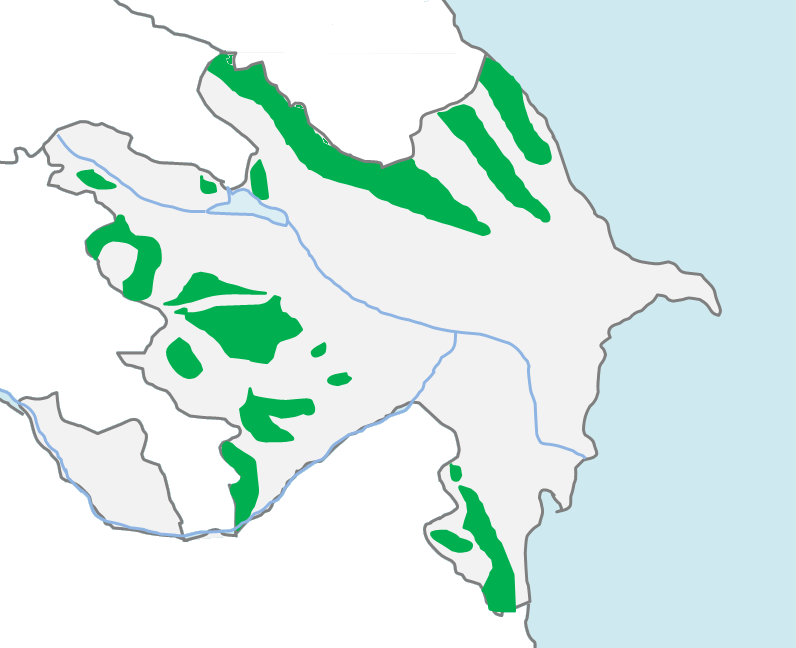
Map showing forest distribution in Azerbaijan

== Flora ==
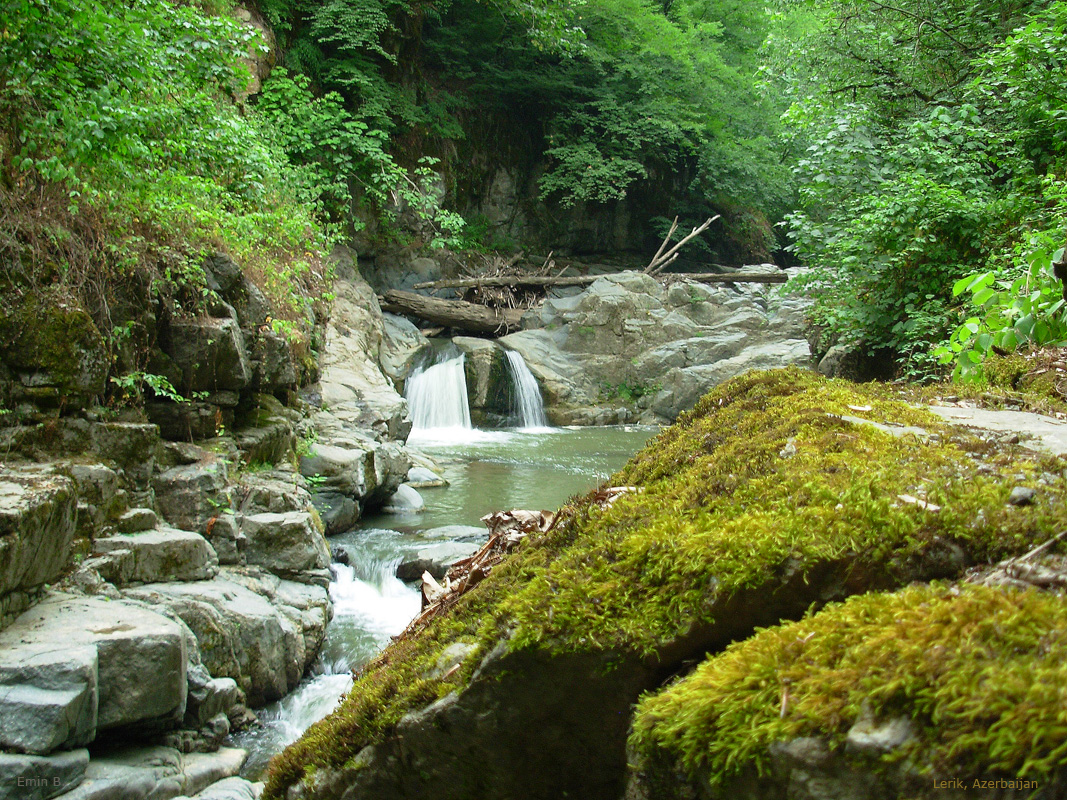
Caspian Hyrcanian mixed forest in the Lerik District

Azerbaijan preserves many endemic tree and shrub species, relics of the Tertiary period which were not affected by Pliocene and Pleistocene glaciations.

The forests of Azerbaijan account for 150 endemic species of trees and bushes out of 435 species of trees and bushes. Some endemic tree species are, the Hyrcanian box tree (Buxus hyrcana), Caucasian pear (Pyrus communis subsp. caucasica), Lenkoran acacia (Albizia julibrissin), chestnut-leaved oak (Quercus castaneifolia), Caucasian oak (Quercus macranthera), Caucasian ash (Fraxinus angustifolia subsp. oxycarpa), European ash (Fraxinus excelsior), European hornbeam (Carpinus betulus), Oriental hornbeam (Carpinus orientalis), Oriental beech (Fagus orientalis), Caucasian persimmon (Diospyros lotus), Caspian locust tree (Gleditsia caspica), Caucasian alder (Alnus subcordata), black alder (Alnus glutinosa subsp. barbata), white poplar (Populus alba) Caucasian wingnut (Pterocarya fraxinifolia), Persian ironwood (Parrotia persica), Caucasian zelkova (Zelkova carpinifolia), butcher's broom (Ruscus aculeatus), velvet maple (Acer velutinum), Cappadocian maple (Acer cappadocicum), wych elm (Ulmus glabra), Caucasian lime tree (Tilia dasystyla subsp. caucasica), wild cherry (Prunus avium), wild service tree (Sorbus torminalis), sweet chestnut (Castanea sativa), Nordmann fir (Abies nordmanniana) among many others.

=== Floristic diversity ===
Extensive territories are covered with wormwood ephemeral and halophytic vegetation in Absheron peninsula, Kobustan, Kura-Araxinskaya lowlands, and foothills and plains of Nakhchivan. There are different kinds of shrubs and bushes on salinized soils such as Salsola arbuscular, Kolidium, Salicornia, and Holocnemum strobelaceum. Tamarix and wild sorghum bushes spread along the lowlands.

In the west region of Azerbaijan, of which lands are dry-plain and semi-dessert, there exist sparse forests. Those forests include Juniperus oblonga, Pinus eldarica, and pistachio. Since the groundwater is highly available in the Samur – Davachi lowlands, Alazani – Agritchay valley, and Karabakh plains, lowland forests in those areas are widespread. Oak, aspen, and poplar can be found in those forests.

There are broadleaf forests on the slopes of the mountains in the Greater Caucasus and Lesser Caucasus, which include beech, white beech, ash, maple, eastern oak, and Iberian oak. The Talysh mountains have relic flora with broadleaf forests. Albizia jilibrissin, Zelkova, and Parrotia persika can be found in the forests of the Talysh mountains.

Floristic diversity in Azerbaijan
Forests	Typical flora	Valuable flora
Beech forests	Maple and beech	-
Marsh forests	Ephedra, juniper, and Christ's thorn	Kokh pine and bearded aspen
Oak – beech forests	Caucasus white beech, Georgian oak, and eastern beech	Trautfetter maple and plane
Oak forests on carbonate soils	White beech and oak	Hazelnut, persimmon, and berry yew
Relic sub-tropical forests	Eastern beech, Caucasus beech, and chestnut oak	Iron tree
Tugai forests	Salsola, reed, soleras, and sarsazan	-
Girkan forests	-	Box tree and Albizia

== Mountain forests ==
=== Greater Caucasus Mountains ===
==== Mountain forests in Gakh ====
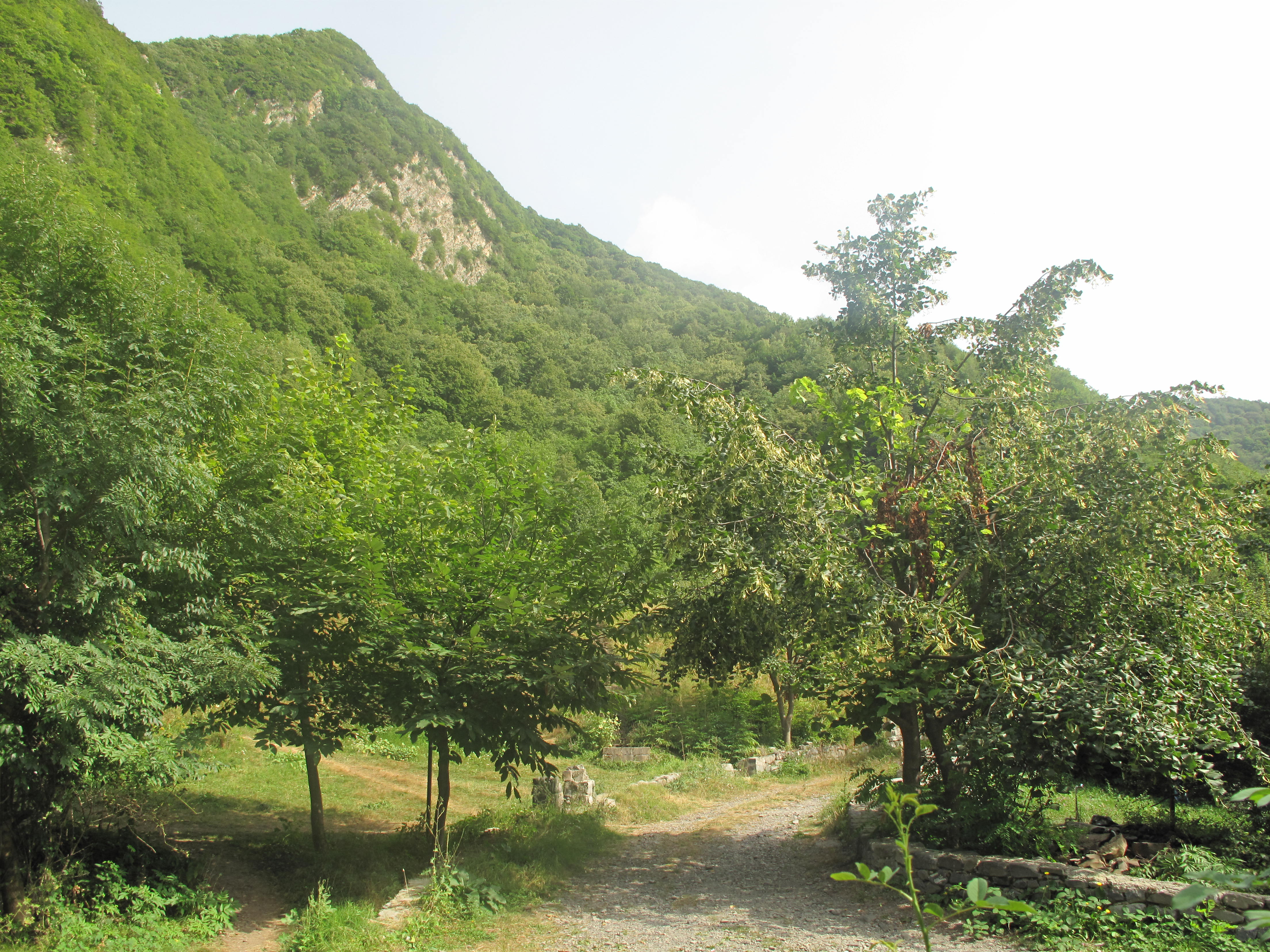
Mountain forests in Gakh

Mountain forests of Gakh region are located in the southern side of the Greater Caucasus in west of Azerbaijan. There are forests territories from 350 to 2000 meters above sea level on the mountains. Caucasian Hornbeam (Carpinus caucasica) Georgian Oak (Quercus iberica) are dominant trees on the dry and warm areas of the mountains. Oriental Hornbeam (Carpinus orientalis) and Oriental Beech (Fagus orientalis) are widespread on the dry lands of the mountains. The timberline includes Trautvetter Maple (Acer trautvetteria) and Persian Oak (Quercus macranthera). In the mountain forests of Gakh, there can be found Tree Hazel (Corylus iberica), which is an endemic species, and only specific to the western territories of the country.

==== Mountain forests in Oguz ====
Mountain forests in Oguz are situated in the eastern Greater Caucasus. From 650 to 1900 meters above sea level, forests areas are located. The trees that are specific to Oguz forests are Caucasian Oak (Quercus iberica), Persian Oak (Quercus macranthera), Caucasian Hornbeam (Carpinus caucasica), and Oriental Beech (Fagus orientalis).

==== Mountain forests in Altiaghaj ====
Scrublands and sparse forests are particular for the region that is located in the eastern Greater Caucasus. Juniper shrubs can be found in Altiaghaj. Their height reaches to 4 meters. There are other ligneous types of plants such as Viburnum lantana, Spirea crenata, and Berberis vulgaris. 1300 meters above sea level, hornbeam forests are distributed.

=== Lesser Caucasus Mountains ===
==== Mountain forests in Shamkir ====
Forests are situated in the Shamkirchay valley, which is the part of the northern side of Lesser Caucasus. They are mainly distributed along the riversides, where water resources are rich. There are different maple species, walnut, and hackberry in these forests. Christ's Thorn, pomegranate, and juniper also can be found on the slope areas. In Shamkir, there are different type of forests such as beech and beech-hornbeam forests, pear-maple forests, and Georgian Oak-hornbeam forests. Plum, hawthorn, apple, medlar, and pear can be found on scrublands.

=== Talysh Mountains ===
==== Hirkanian forest ====
Hirkanian forests cover the territories of both Azerbaijan and Iran. The area of Hirkanian forests is approximately 0.1 million ha in Azerbaijan. Hirkan National Park was settled in the Talysh mountains, which covers about 38000 ha territory enclosing different zones of forest.

The Caspian forests is a part of Hirkanian forest province. In these forests, there can be found some endemic trees such as Albizzia julibrissin, Parrotia persica, Quercus castaneifolia, and Gleditsia capsica. Peculiarity of this forest is that, there are various species of plants that include 211 species of shrub and semi-shrub, 90 species of tree, and approximately 1500 vascular plant species. Other than that, Chestnut-leaved Oak, Date Plum, Zelkovie, Caucasian Wing-nut, Velvet maple, Oriental Beech, and Perian Oak can be found in Hirkanian forest. There are also various evergreen species of trees exist such as Ilex spinigera, Buxus hyrcana, and Danae racemose.

==== Zuvand ====
Zuvand region is situated near Lerik district. The area is semi-desert, therefore, the vegetation in Zuvand is durable for drought. In the large areas of Zuvan forests, there is Frigana vegetation, which has three groups. First group includes Astragalus meyerii, aureus, and persicus. The second group is Acantholimon and the third group is Onobrychus. Quercus macrantera and Fagus orientalis are also specific to these forests.

== Management and protection ==
All forests are owned by the state and are under the management of the Ministry of Ecology and Natural Resources of Azerbaijan, and forest land usage is limited by law and industrial cutting is forbidden. The "Forest Code" of the Republic of Azerbaijan and the "Law of the Azerbaijan Republic on Environmental Protection" are the main legal documents regulating the protection and management of forests in the country.

The "National Program on restoration and expansion of forests in the Azerbaijani Republic" adopted for the period 2003-2008 contributed partially to the improvement of the situation: over the last 6 years forest restoration actions were carried out on more than 71,634 hectares of forest land, and a large number of trees were planted. According to the Forest Development Department of the Ministry of Ecology and Natural Resources of Azerbaijan during the 2013 large-scale forest restoration activities were carried out at the territory of 1031 ha.

There are two main departments that are dealing with forestry issues under the Ministry of Ecology and Natural Resources in Azerbaijan. Forestry Development Department deals with the management of the lands and resources of forests, and Department of Biodiversity and Protected Natural Areas manages the protected forests.

=== Forestry Development Department ===
The responsibilities of the department include restoration and preservation of forests. There are five divisions within the department. The department has 33 enterprises that deal with rehabilitation and protection of forests, 2 enterprises of afforestation, and 6 forests nurseries. Forestry Scientific Research Institute is a unit of the departments and deals with forestry.

== Problems ==
The Azerbaijani forests experience problems of different characters. Most of them are linked with the lack of awareness among the local population on issues of sustainable forest management, impact of climate change on the forests and the insufficient enforcement of existing laws on forest protection.

The occupation of the part of the country's territory by Armenia (Nagorno-Karabakh and the territories surrounding it) caused a significant damage to the forests, especially those located in the mountainous areas.

Another critical problem is the continuous practice of illegal grazing for firewood in the forests which are damaging the biodiversity and are resulting in economic and social losses. Illegal logging remains a challenge for the Azerbaijani forest sector since country's independence.

Due to the poor management in many regions, and especially villages located in proximity to the forests, acts of illegal logging exist and pose a significant threat to the forests. The same threat comes from the unsustainable tourism and recreation practices. At the same time the forests of Azerbaijan feel the impact of the global climate change with an increase of forest fires during the summer.
