= Zuvand =

Zuvand may refer to:

- Köhnə Zuvand ("Old Zuvand"), Azerbaijan
- Yeni Zuvand ("New Zuvand"), Azerbaijan
- Zuvand District, former name of Lerik District, Azerbaijan
- Zuvand National Park, Azerbaijan
