= South Caucasus =

Geographical region on the border of Eastern Europe and West Asia

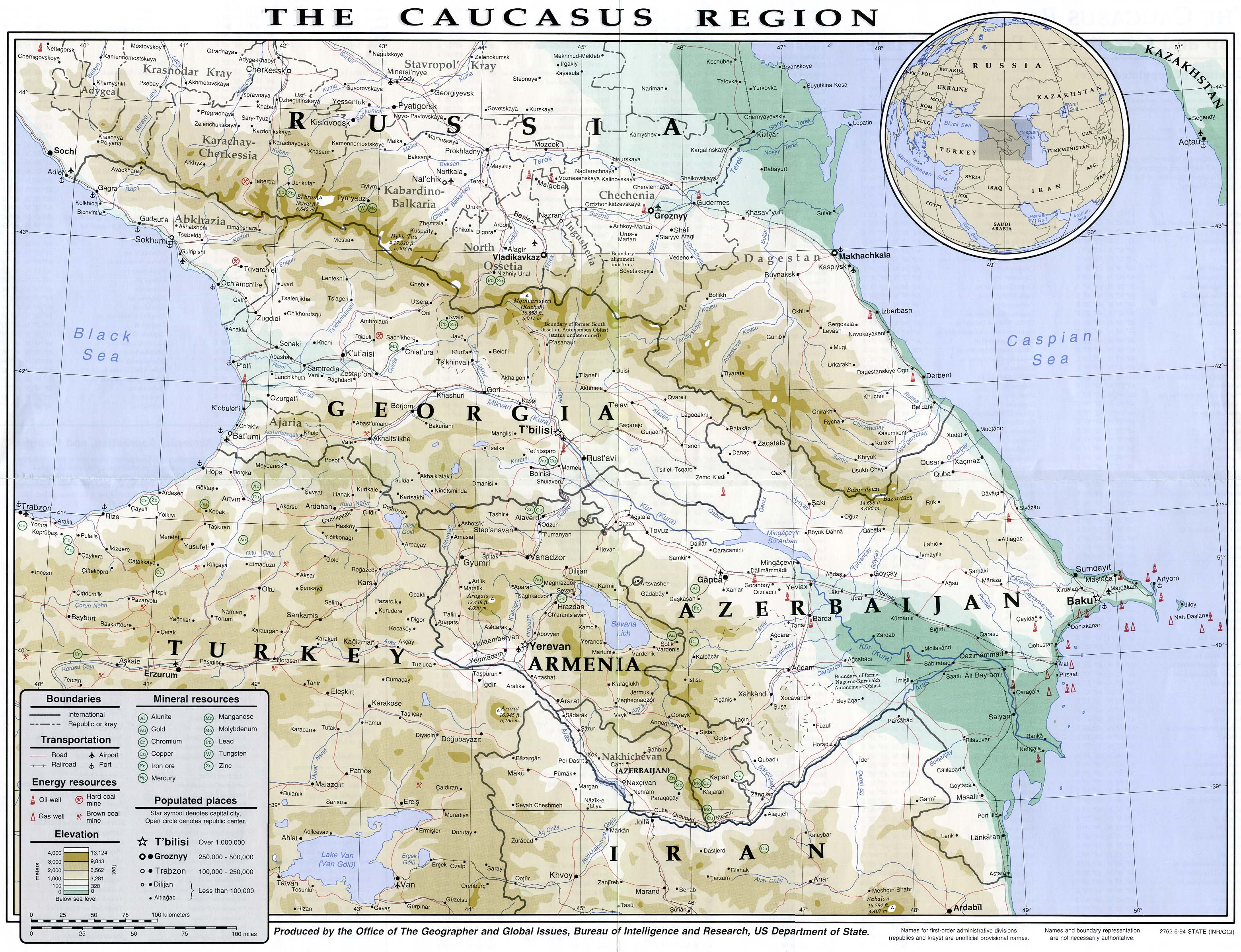
- 1994 map of Caucasus region prepared by the U.S. State Department
- Coordinates: 42°15′40″N 44°07′16″E
- Countries: Armenia; Azerbaijan; Georgia; De facto states with limited recognition: Abkhazia; South Ossetia
- Time zones: UTC+04:00, UTC+03:30 and UTC+03:00
- Highest mountain: Shkhara (5,203 metres (17,070 ft))

The South Caucasus, also known as Transcaucasia, or the Transcaucasus, is a geographical region on the border of Eastern Europe and West Asia, straddling the southern Caucasus Mountains. The South Caucasus roughly corresponds to modern Armenia, Georgia, and Azerbaijan. The total area of these countries measure about 186,100 square kilometres (71,850 square miles). The South Caucasus and the North Caucasus together comprise the larger Caucasus geographical region that divides Eurasia.

== Geography ==
The South Caucasus spans the southern portion of the Caucasus Mountains and their lowlands, straddling the border between the continents of Europe and Asia, and extending southwards from the southern part of the Main Caucasian Range of southwestern Russia to the Turkish and Armenian borders, and from the Black Sea in the west to the Caspian Sea coast of Iran in the east. The area includes the southern part of the Greater Caucasus mountain range, the entire Lesser Caucasus mountain range, the Colchis Lowlands, the Kura-Aras Lowlands, Qaradagh, the Talysh Mountains, the Lankaran Lowland, Javakheti and the eastern portion of the Armenian Highlands.

All of present-day Armenia is in the South Caucasus; the majority of present-day Georgia and Azerbaijan, including the exclave of Nakhchivan, also fall within the region. Goods produced in the region include oil, manganese ore, tea, citrus fruits, and wine. It remains one of the most politically tense regions in the post-Soviet area, and contains two heavily disputed areas: Abkhazia and South Ossetia. Between 1878 and 1917, the Russian-controlled province of Kars Oblast and the county of Surmalu uezd (present-day Iğdır Province) were also incorporated into administrative regions of the South Caucasus.

== Etymology ==
Nowadays, the region is referred to as the South Caucasus or Southern Caucasia (Armenian: Հարավային Կովկաս, romanized: Haravayin Kovkas; Azerbaijani: Cənubi Qafqaz; Abkhaz: Агырҭ Кавказ, romanized: Agyrt Kavkaz; Georgian: სამხრეთ კავკასია, romanized: samkhret k'avk'asia; Russian: Южный Кавказ, romanized: Yuzhnyy Kavkaz). The former name of the region, Transcaucasia, is a Latin rendering of the Russian-language word Zakavkazye (Закавказье), meaning "[the area] beyond the Caucasus". This implies a Russian vantage point, and is analogous to similar terms such as Transnistria and Transleithania. Other, rarer forms of this word include Trans-Caucasus and Transcaucasus (Russian: Транскавказ, romanized: Transkavkaz).

== History ==
=== Prehistory ===
Herodotus, a Greek historian who is known as 'the Father of History' and Strabo, a Greek geographer, philosopher, and historian, spoke about autochthonous peoples of the Caucasus in their books. In the Middle Ages, various people, including Scythians, Alani, Huns, Khazars, Arabs, Seljuq Turks, and Mongols settled in Caucasia. These invasions influenced on the culture of the peoples of the South Caucasus. In parallel Middle Eastern influence disseminated the Iranian languages and Islamic religion in Caucasus.

Contemporary political map of the Caucasus (including unrecognized states)

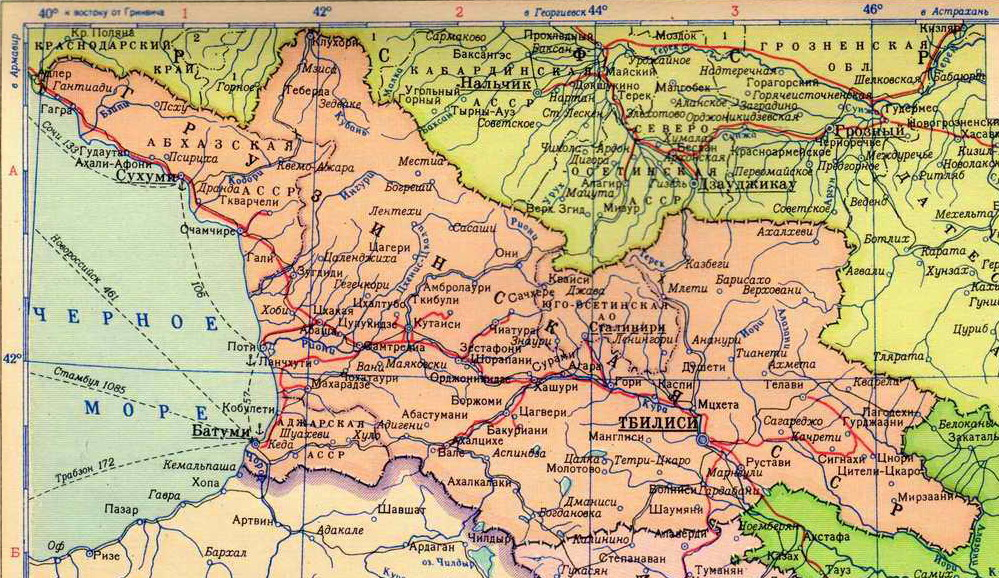
While primarily located in the South Caucasus, in the mid-20th century Georgian SSR also included a number of territories in the North Caucasus, connecting two sides of the region.

Located on the peripheries of Iran, Russia and Turkey, the region has been an arena for political, military, religious, and cultural rivalries and expansionism for centuries. Throughout its history, the region has come under control of various empires, including the Achaemenid, Neo-Assyrian Empire, Parthian, Roman, Sasanian, Byzantine, Umayyad, Abbasid, Mongol, Ottoman, successive Iranian (Safavid, Afsharid, Qajar), and Russian Empires, all of which introduced their faiths and cultures. Throughout history, most of the South Caucasus was usually under the direct rule of the various in-Iran based empires and part of the Iranian world. In the course of the 19th century, Qajar Iran had to irrevocably cede the region (alongside its territories in Dagestan, North Caucasus) as a result of the two Russo-Persian Wars of that century to Imperial Russia.

Ancient kingdoms of the region included Colchis, Urartu, Iberia, Armenia and Albania, among others. These kingdoms were later incorporated into various Iranian empires, including the Achaemenid Empire, the Parthian Empire, and the Sassanid Empire, during which Zoroastrianism became the dominant religion in the region. However, after the rise of Christianity and conversion of Caucasian kingdoms to the new religion, Zoroastrianism lost its prevalence and only survived because of Persian power and influence still lingering in the region. Thus, the South Caucasus became the area of not only military, but also religious convergence, which often led to bitter conflicts with successive Persian empires (and later Muslim-ruled empires) on the one side and the Roman Empire (and later the Byzantine Empire and Russian Empire) on the other side.

The Iranian Parthians established and installed several eponymous branches in the South Caucasus, namely the Arsacid dynasty of Armenia, the Arsacid dynasty of Iberia, and the Arsacid dynasty of Caucasian Albania.

=== Middle Ages and Russian rule ===
In the middle of the 8th century, with the capture of Derbend by the Umayyad armies during the Arab–Khazar wars, most of the South Caucasus became part of the Caliphate and Islam spread throughout the region. Later, the Orthodox Christian Kingdom of Georgia dominated most of the South Caucasus. The region was then conquered by the Seljuk, Mongol, Turkic, Safavid, Ottoman, Afsharid and Qajar dynasties.

After two wars in the first half of the 19th century, namely the Russo-Persian War (1804–1813) and the Russo-Persian War (1826–1828), the Russian Empire conquered most of the South Caucasus (and Dagestan in the North Caucasus) from the Iranian Qajar dynasty, severing historic regional ties with Iran. By the Treaty of Gulistan that followed after the 1804–1813 war, Iran was forced to cede modern-day Dagestan, Eastern Georgia, and most of the Azerbaijan Republic to Russia. By the Treaty of Turkmenchay that followed after the 1826–1828 war, Iran lost all of what is modern-day Armenia and the remainder of the contemporary Azerbaijani Republic that remained in Iranian hands. After the 1828–1829 war, the Ottomans ceded Western Georgia (except Adjaria, which was known as Sanjak of Batum), to the Russian Empire, which started to use this new southern boundary for the resettlement of undesirable citizens and tolerated heretics (sektanty).

In 1844, what comprises present-day Georgia, Armenia, and Azerbaijan were combined into a single czarist government-general, which was termed a vice-royalty in 1844–1881 and 1905–1917. Following the 1877–78 Russo-Turkish War, Russia annexed Kars, Ardahan, Agri and Batumi from the Ottomans, joined to this unit, and established the province of Kars Oblast as its most south-westerly territory in the South Caucasus.

=== Modern era ===
Members of the Eastern Partnership

After the fall of the Russian Empire in 1918, the South Caucasus region was unified into a single political entity twice, as the Transcaucasian Democratic Federative Republic from 9 April 1918 to 26 May 1918, and as the Transcaucasian Socialist Federative Soviet Republic from 12 March 1922 to 5 December 1936.

Both times these Transcaucasian entities dissolved, although the region would remain politically bound together in the Soviet Union in the form of the three separate Soviet Socialist Republics of Armenia, Azerbaijan and Georgia. When the Soviet Union dissolved in 1991, all three emerged as internationally recognized sovereign states. Transit through the South Caucasus has been hampered since 1989 due to the ongoing Turkish–Azeri blockade of Armenia.

The Russo-Georgian War took place in 2008 across the South Caucasus, contributing to further instability in the region, which is as intricate as the Middle East, due to the complex mix of religions (mainly Muslim and Orthodox Christian) and ethno-linguistic groups.

Since their independence, the three countries have had varying degrees of success in their relations with Russia and other countries. In Georgia, after the Rose Revolution in 2004, the country, like the Baltic states, began integrating into wider European society by opening up relations with NATO and the European Union. Armenia continues to foster relations with Russia, while also developing ties with the EU. Azerbaijan relies less on Russia, strategically partnering with Turkey. All three South Caucasus countries are members of the Council of Europe, the Organization for Security and Co-operation in Europe, the European Political Community, and participate in the EU's Eastern Partnership and Euronest Parliamentary Assembly. All three South Caucasus countries are also members of NATO's Euro-Atlantic Partnership Council and Partnership for Peace.

On 8 November 2023, the European Commission issued an official recommendation to grant EU candidate status to Georgia, which was confirmed on 14 December 2023. Georgia, thus becoming, the first country in the South Caucasus to receive EU candidate status. On 12 March 2024, the European Parliament passed a resolution confirming Armenia meets Maastricht Treaty Article 49 requirements and that the country may apply for EU membership. On 12 February 2025, Armenia's parliament approved a bill officially endorsing Armenia's EU accession.

== Demographics ==
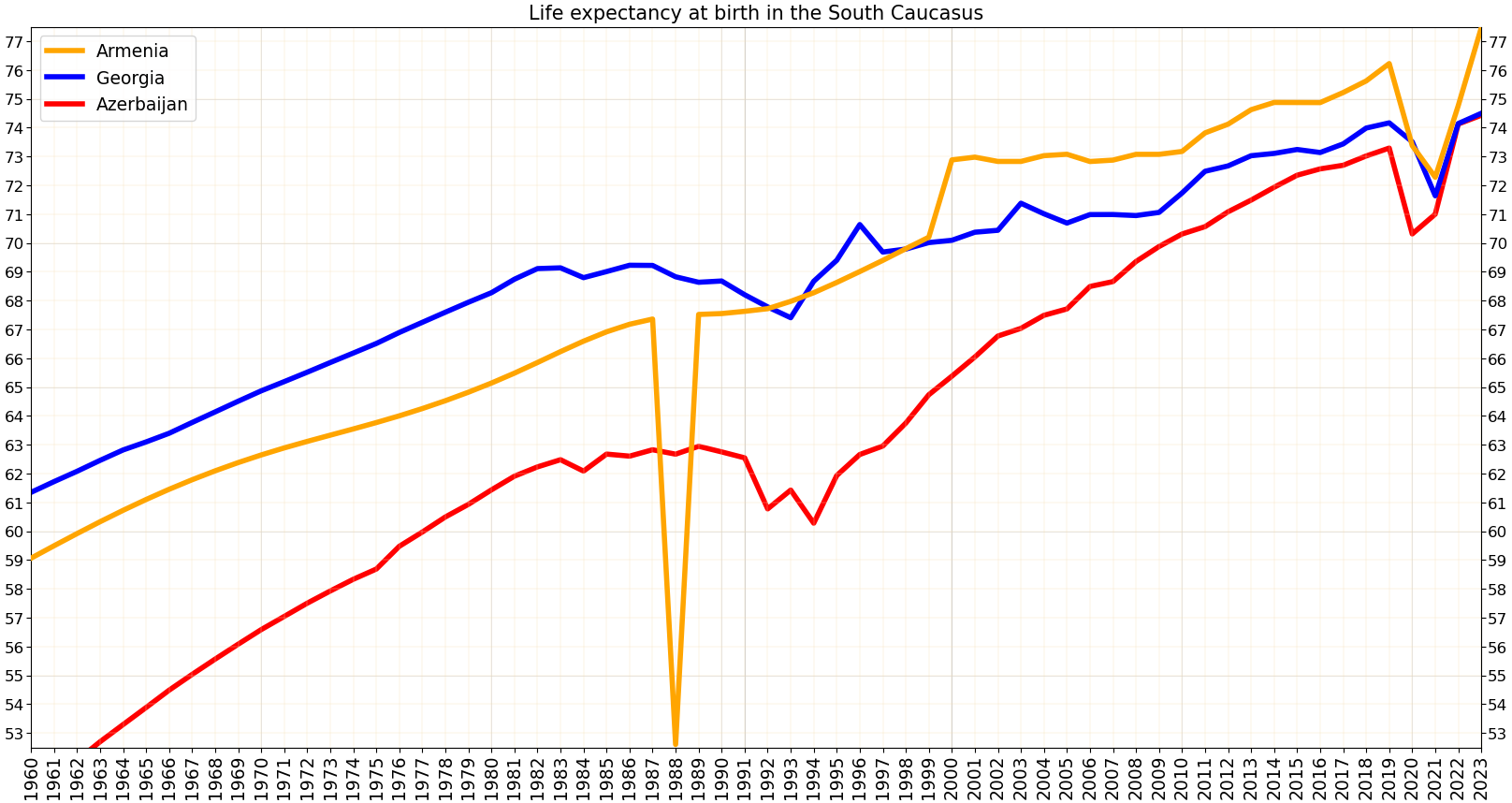
Development of life expectancy in the countries of the South Caucasus

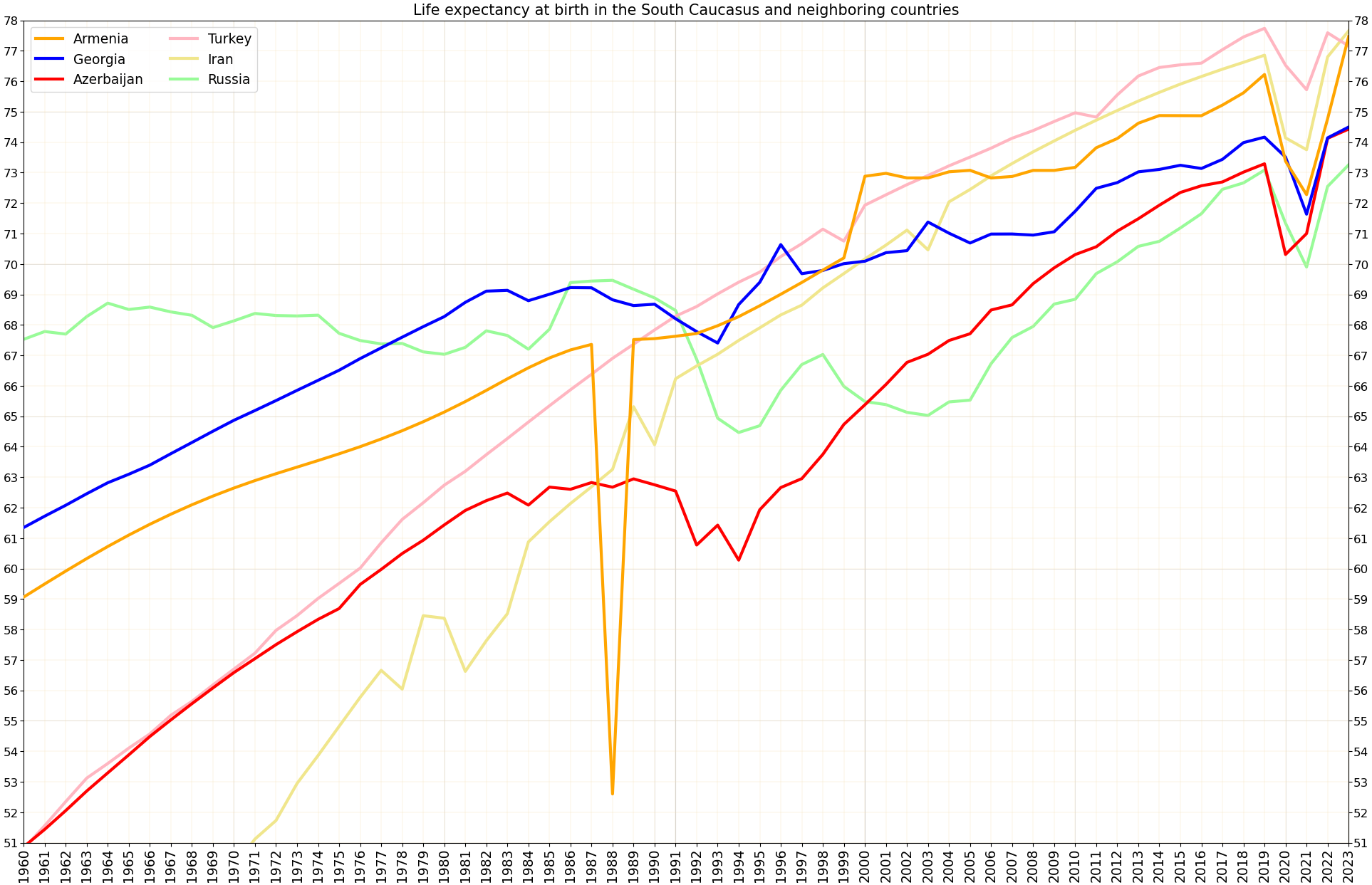
Development of life expectancy in the countries of the South Caucasus and in the neighboring countries

Historical population of the South Caucasus
Year	Armenia	Azerbaijan	Georgia	Total
1897	798,853	1,806,700	1,919,400	4,524,953
1908	877,322	2,014,300		
1914	1,014,255	2,278,245	2,697,500	5,990,000
1916–17	993,782	2,353,700	2,357,800	5,705,282
First World War and Russian Revolution
1920–22	780,000	1,863,000	2,677,000	5,321,000
1926	880,464	2,314,571	2,666,494	5,861,529
1929				6,273,000
1931	1,050,633			6,775,000
1932				6,976,000
1933				7,110,000
1939	1,282,338	3,205,150	3,540,023	8,027,511
1956				9,000,000
1959	1,763,048	3,697,717	4,044,045	9,504,810
1970	2,491,873	5,117,081	4,686,358	12,295,312
1979	3,037,259	6,026,515	4,993,182	14,056,956
1989	3,304,776	7,037,867	5,400,841	15,743,484
1999–2002	3,213,011	7,953,400	3,991,300	15,157,711
2009–14	3,018,854	8,922,000	3,713,804	15,654,658

== See also ==
- Caucasus
- Caucasus Greeks
- Community for Democracy and Rights of Nations
- Eastern Europe
- Eastern European Group
- Eurasian Economic Union
- Eurovoc
- EU Strategy for the South Caucasus
- Ibero-Caucasian languages
- North Caucasus (Ciscaucasia)
- Peoples of the Caucasus
- Post-Soviet states
- Regions of Europe
