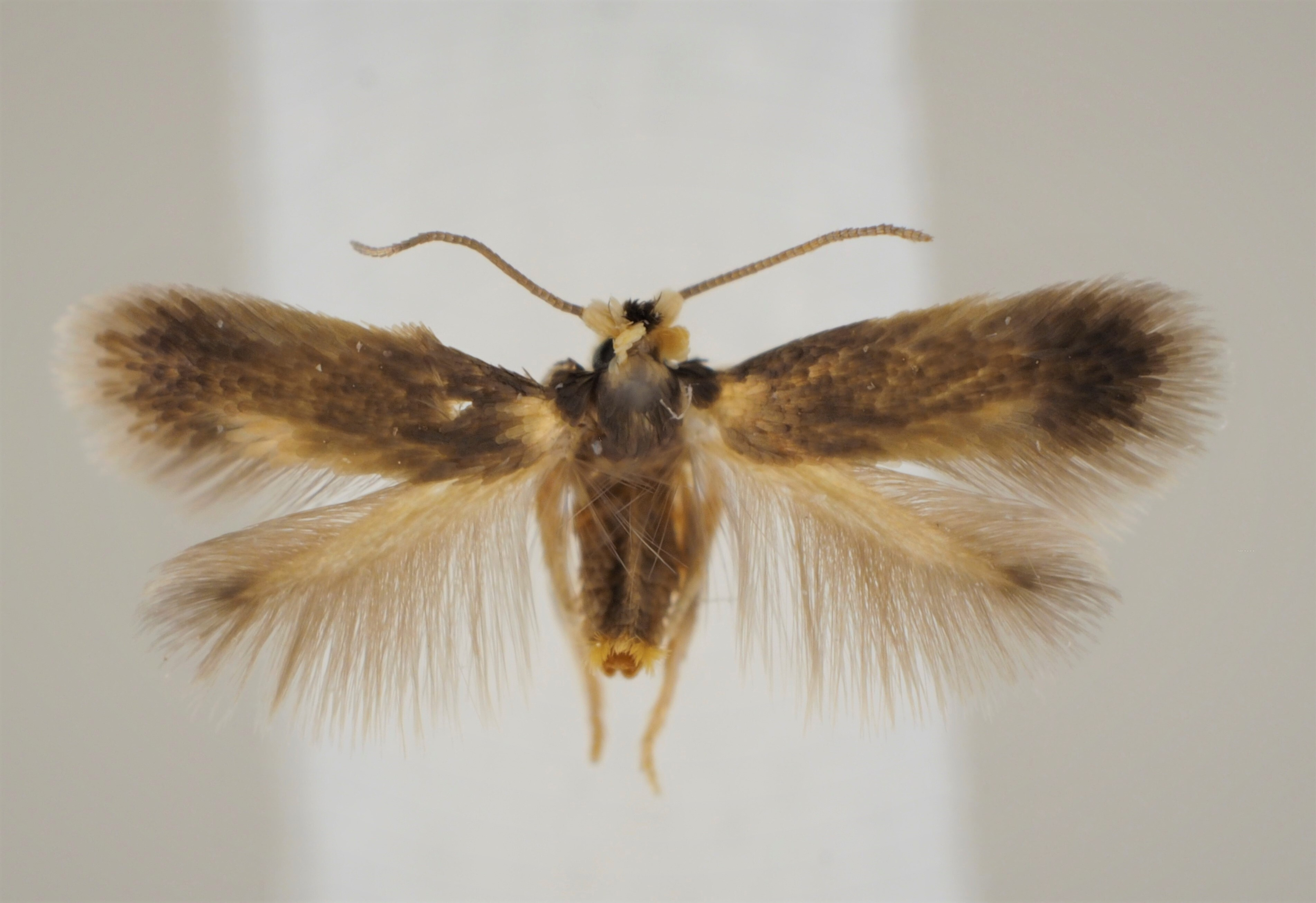
- '

Scientific classification
- Kingdom: Animalia
- Phylum: Arthropoda
- Clade: Pancrustacea
- Class: Insecta
- Order: Lepidoptera
- Family: Nepticulidae
- Genus: Stigmella
- Species: S. basiguttella

Binomial name
- Stigmella basiguttella (Heinemann, 1862)

Synonyms
- Nepticula basiguttella Heinemann, 1862; Stigmella cerricolella Klimesch, 1946

= Stigmella basiguttella =

Species of moth

Stigmella basiguttella is a moth of the family Nepticulidae. It is found in all of Europe, except Ireland and Iceland. It is also found in south-west Asia up to northern Iran. It has recently been recorded from Azerbaijan, Georgia and Tunisia.

The wingspan is 4.5–6 millimetres (0.18–0.24 in). Adults are on wing from May to June and from July to September.

The larvae feed on Castanea sativa, Quercus castaneifolia, Quercus cerris, Quercus frainetto, Quercus macrolepis, Quercus petraea, Quercus pubescens, Quercus pyrenaica, Quercus robur and Quercus rubra. They mine the leaves of their host plant.
