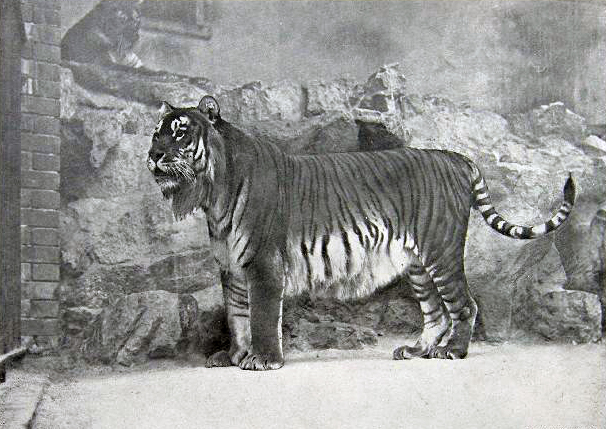
- Tiger from the Caucasus in Berlin Zoological Garden, 1899

Conservation status
- Extinct (1970)

Scientific classification
- Kingdom: Animalia
- Phylum: Chordata
- Class: Mammalia
- Order: Carnivora
- Family: Felidae
- Genus: Panthera
- Species: P. tigris
- Subspecies: P. t. tigris
- Population: †Caspian tiger
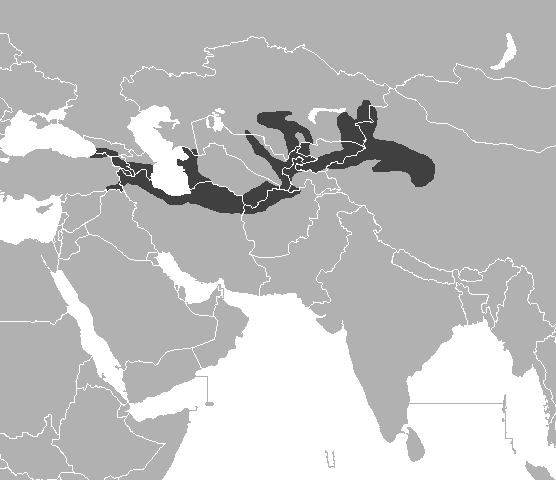
- Historical distribution

= Caspian tiger =

Extinct tiger population in Central and West Asia

The Caspian tiger was a Panthera tigris tigris population native to eastern Turkey, northern Iran, Mesopotamia, the Caucasus around the Caspian Sea, Central Asia to northern Afghanistan and the Xinjiang region in Western China. It inhabited sparse forests and riverine corridors in this region until the 1970s. It was also present in Southern Russia until the Middle Ages. The Caspian tiger population was regarded as a distinct subspecies and assessed as extinct in 2003.

Results of a phylogeographic analysis evinces that the Caspian and Siberian tiger populations shared a common continuous geographic distribution until the early 19th century.

Some Caspian tigers were intermediate in size between Siberian and Bengal tigers.

It was also called Balkhash tiger, Hyrcanian tiger, Turanian tiger, and Mazandaran tiger.

== Taxonomy ==
Felis virgata was a scientific name used by Johann Karl Wilhelm Illiger in 1815 for the greyish tiger in the area surrounding the Caspian Sea. Tigris septentrionalis was the scientific name proposed by Konstantin Satunin in 1904 for a skull and mounted skins of tigers that were killed in the Lankaran Lowland in the 1860s. Felis tigris lecoqi and Felis tigris trabata were proposed by Ernst Schwarz in 1916 for tiger skins and skulls from Lop Nur and Ili River areas, respectively.

In 1929, Reginald Innes Pocock subordinated the tiger to the genus Panthera. For several decades, the Caspian tiger was considered a distinct tiger subspecies.

In 1999, the validity of several tiger subspecies was questioned. Most putative subspecies described in the 19th and 20th centuries were distinguished on basis of fur length and colouration, striping patterns and body size, hence characteristics that vary widely within populations. Morphologically, tigers from different regions vary little, and gene flow between populations in those regions is considered to have been possible during the Pleistocene. Therefore, it was proposed to recognize only two tiger subspecies as valid, namely P. t. tigris in mainland Asia, and P. t. sondaica in the Greater Sunda Islands and possibly in Sundaland.

At the start of the 21st century, genetic studies were carried out using 20 tiger bone and tissue samples from museum collections and sequencing at least one segment of five mitochondrial genes. Results revealed a low amount of variability in the mitochondrial DNA in Caspian tigers; and that Caspian and Siberian tigers were remarkably similar, indicating that the Siberian tiger is the genetically closest living relative of the Caspian tiger. Phylogeographic analysis indicates that the common ancestor of Caspian and Siberian tigers colonized Central Asia via the Gansu−Silk Road region from eastern China less than 10,000 years ago, and subsequently traversed eastward to establish the Siberian tiger population in the Russian Far East. The Caspian and Siberian tigers were likely a single contiguous population until the early 19th century, but became isolated from another due to fragmentation and loss of habitat during the Industrial Revolution.

In 2015, morphological, ecological and molecular traits of all putative tiger subspecies were analysed in a combined approach. Results support distinction of the two evolutionary groups continental and Sunda tigers. The authors proposed recognition of only two subspecies, namely P. t. tigris comprising the Bengal, Malayan, Indochinese, South Chinese, Siberian and Caspian tiger populations, and P. t. sondaica comprising the Javan, Bali, and Sumatran tiger populations. Tigers in mainland Asia fall into two clades, namely a northern clade formed by the Caspian and Siberian tiger populations, and a southern clade formed by populations in remaining mainland Asia.

In 2017, the Cat Specialist Group revised felid taxonomy and now recognizes the tiger populations in continental Asia as P. t. tigris. However, a genetic study published in 2018 supported six monophyletic clades, with the Amur and Caspian tigers being distinct from other mainland Asian populations, thus supporting the traditional concept of six living subspecies.

== Characteristics ==
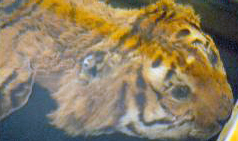
Skin of a Caspian tiger from Iran

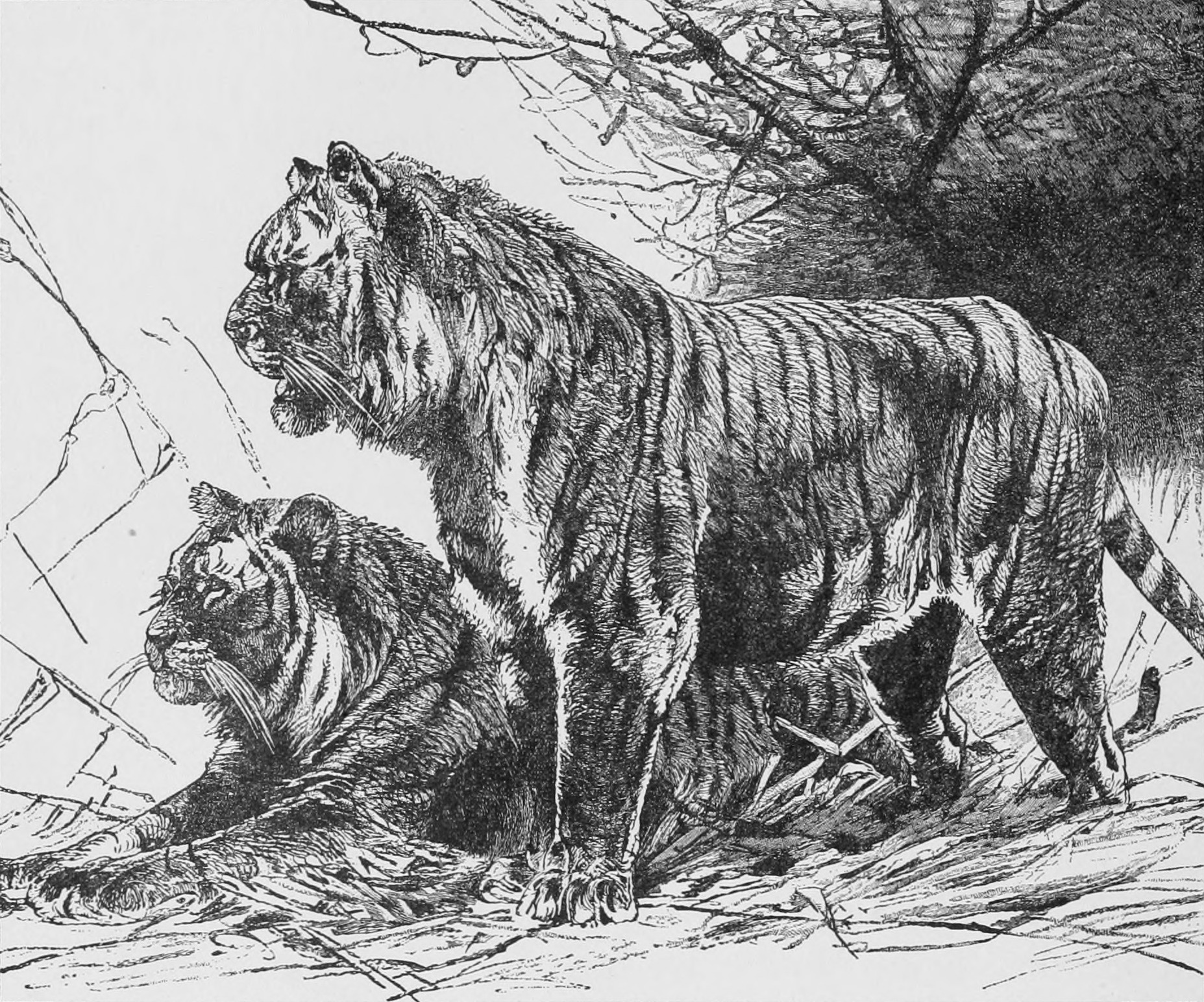
Illustration of two Caspian tigers

=== Fur ===
Photographs of skins of Caspian and Siberian tigers indicate that the main background colour of the Caspian tiger's fur varied and was generally brighter and more uniform than that of the Siberian tiger. The stripes were narrower, fuller and more closely set than those of tigers from Manchuria. The colour of its stripes was a mixture of brown or cinnamon shades. Pure black patterns were invariably found only on head, neck, the middle of the back and at the tip of the tail. Angular patterns at the base of the tail were less developed than those of Far Eastern populations. The contrast between the summer and winter coats was sharp, though not to the same extent as in Far Eastern populations. The winter coat was paler, with less distinct patterns. The summer coat had a similar density and hair length to that of the Bengal tiger, though its stripes were usually narrower, longer and closer set. It had the thickest fur amongst tigers, possibly due its occurrence in the temperate parts of Asia.

The length of the summer hair ranges from 8–18 mm on the back and about 20–60 mm on the belly. The neck hair measures 55–70 mm in length. The cheek whiskers typically reach a length of about 60–70 mm. Because the winter coat was considerably longer than the summer hair one, corresponding hair measurements revealed 27–40 mm on the back, 60–110 mm on the belly, and 40 to 120 mm on the neck, whereas the length of the cheek whiskers ranged from 70 to 140 mm.

=== Size ===
The Caspian tiger ranked among the largest extant cat species along with the Siberian tiger. Males had a body length of 270–295 cm (106–116 in) measured between the pegs, whereas females measured 240–260 cm (94–102 in). Another tigress measured in the flesh was 255.9 cm (100.7 in) in total length with a tail length of 91 cm (36 in). Males weighed 170–240 kg (370–530 lb), while females weighed 85–135 kg (187–298 lb). Some individuals attained exceptional sizes. A tiger killed in February 1899 in Prishibinske measured 360 cm (140 in) after skinning, with a head to body length of 270 cm (110 in) and a 90 cm (35 in) long tail; measurements between the pegs of up to 295 cm (116 in) are known. It was said to have been "a tiger of immense proportions" and "no smaller than the local horse breeds."

=== Skull ===
The size and shape of Caspian tiger skulls significantly overlap with and are almost indistinguishable from other tiger specimens in mainland Asia. Maximum skull length of male Caspian tigers was 297–365.8 mm (11.69–14.40 in), while that of females was 195.7–255.5 mm (7.70–10.06 in). Its occiput was broader than of the Bengal tiger.

In 1954, a tiger was killed near the Sumbar River in Kopet-Dag, whose stuffed skin was put on display in a museum in Ashgabat. Its head-to-body length was 225 cm (89 in). Its skull had a condylobasal length of about 305 mm (12.0 in), and zygomatic width of 205 mm (8.1 in). Its skull length was 385 mm (15.2 in), hence more than the known maximum of 365.8 mm (14.40 in) for this population, and slightly exceeding skull length of most Siberian tigers.

== Distribution and habitat ==
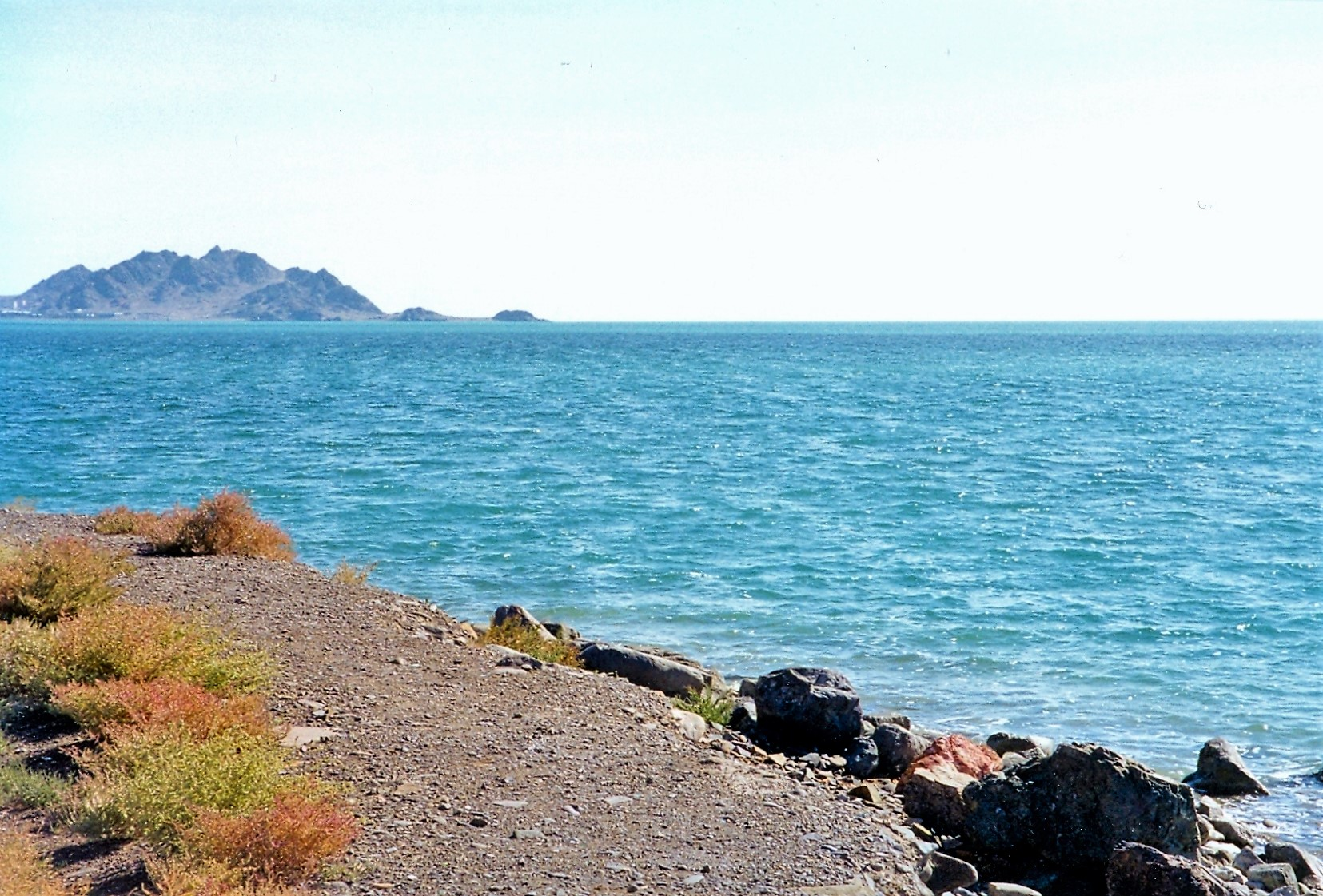
Shore of the Türkmenbaşy Gulf at the Caspian Sea

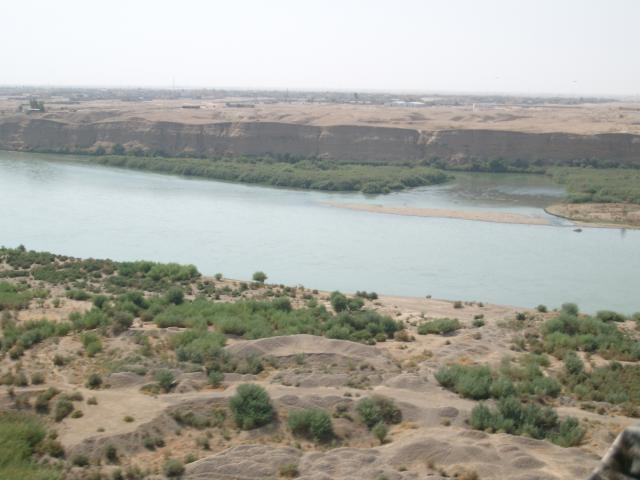
The Tigris River outside Mosul in Iraq

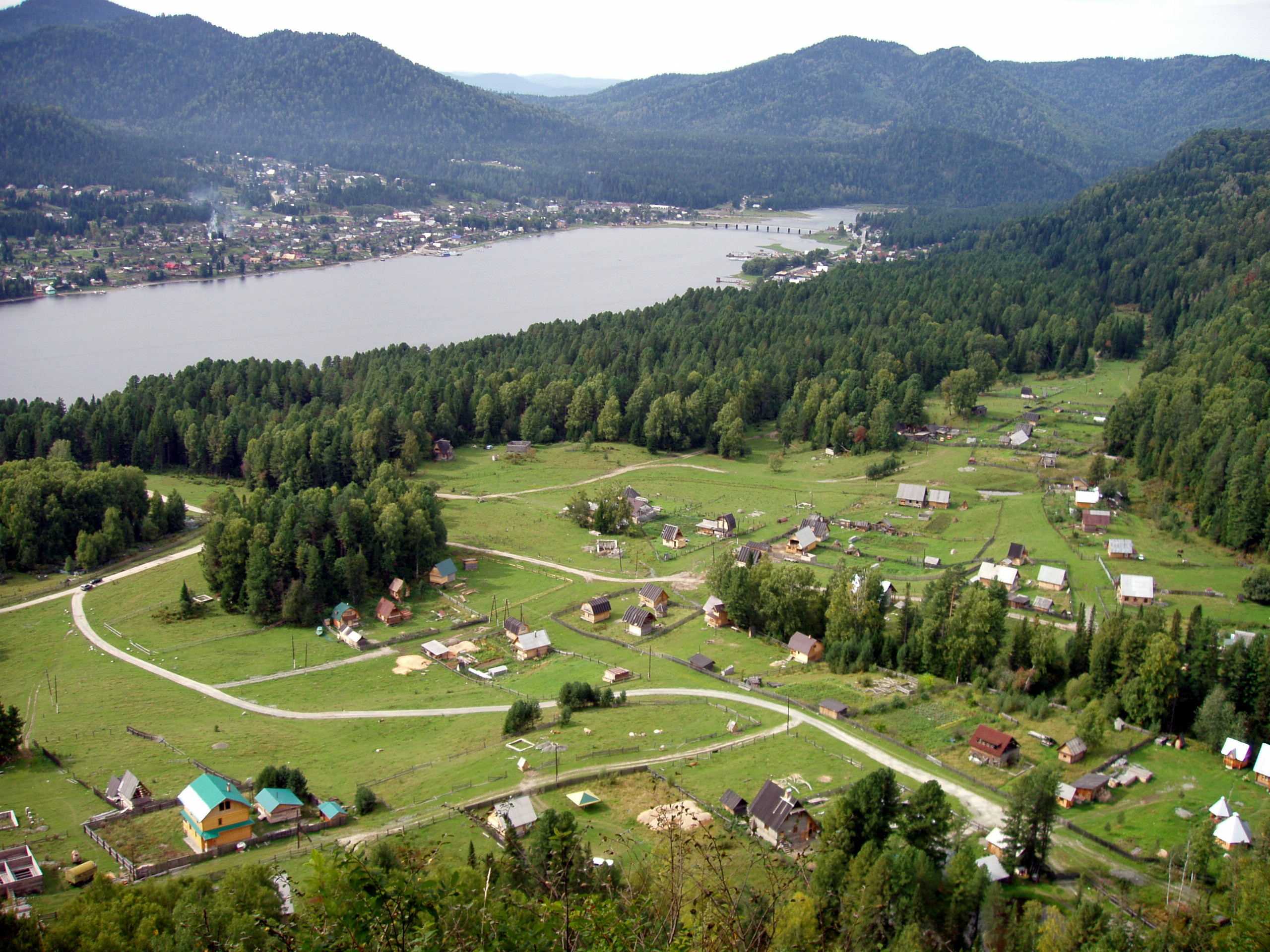
Landscape in the Altai Mountains

In the 19th century, tigers occurred in:

- the Eastern Anatolia region, which is considered to have been the westernmost area where tigers occurred. Records are known from the region of Mount Ararat, Şanlıurfa, Şırnak, Siirt and Hakkari Provinces in eastern Turkey; in the Hakkari Province tigers possibly occurred up to the 1990s. The only confirmed record in Iraq dates to 1887 when a tiger was shot near Mosul, which is considered to have been a migrant from southeastern Turkey. There are also claims of historical tiger presence in the area of the Tigris–Euphrates river system in Iraq and Syria.
- the extreme southeast of the Caucasus, such as in hilly and lowland forests of the Talysh Mountains, in the Lenkoran Lowlands, in the lowland forests of Göytəpə, Jalilabad, from where tigers moved into the eastern plains of the Trans-Caucasus up to the Don River basin; the Arasbaran and Zangezur Mountains of northwestern Persia.
- in the region of the Caspian Sea, where its distribution was patchy and associated with wetlands such as river basins, lake edges and sea shores. In Iran, historical records are known only from along the southern coast of the Caspian Sea and adjacent Alborz Mountains.
- Central Asia, such as in southwestern Turkmenia along the Atrek River and its tributaries, and the Sumbar and Chandyr Rivers; in the western and southwestern parts of Kopet-Dag; in the environs of Ashkabad in the northern foothills; in Afghanistan along the upper reaches of Hari-Rud at Herat, and along the jungles in the lower reaches of the river; around Tejen and Murgap and along the Kushka and Kashan rivers; in the Amu Darya basin as far the Aral Sea and along the entire coast of the Aral Sea; along the Syr-Darya to the Fergana Valley as far as Tashkent and the western spur of Talas Alatau; along the Chu and Ili Rivers; all along the southern shore of Lake Balkhash and northwards into the southern Altai Mountains, and to southeastern Transbaikal or Western Siberia in the east. In China, it occurred in the Tarim, Manasi River and Lop Nur basins.

Its former distribution can be approximated by examining the distribution of ungulates in the region. Wild boar was the numerically dominant ungulate in forested habitats, along watercourses, in reed beds and in thickets of the Caspian and Aral Seas. Where watercourses penetrated deep into desert areas, suitable wild pig and tiger habitat was often linear, only a few kilometers wide at most. Red and roe deer occurred in forests around the Black Sea to the western side and around the southern side of the Caspian Sea in a narrow belt of forest cover. Roe deer occurred in forested areas south of Lake Balkhash. Bactrian deer lived in the narrow belt of forest habitat on the southern border of the Aral Sea, and southward along the Syr-Darya and Amu Darya rivers.

Throughout the late Pleistocene and Holocene, the Caspian tiger population was likely connected to the Bengal tiger population through corridors below elevations of 4,000 m (13,000 ft) in the Hindu Kush, before gene flow was interrupted by humans.

=== Local extinction ===
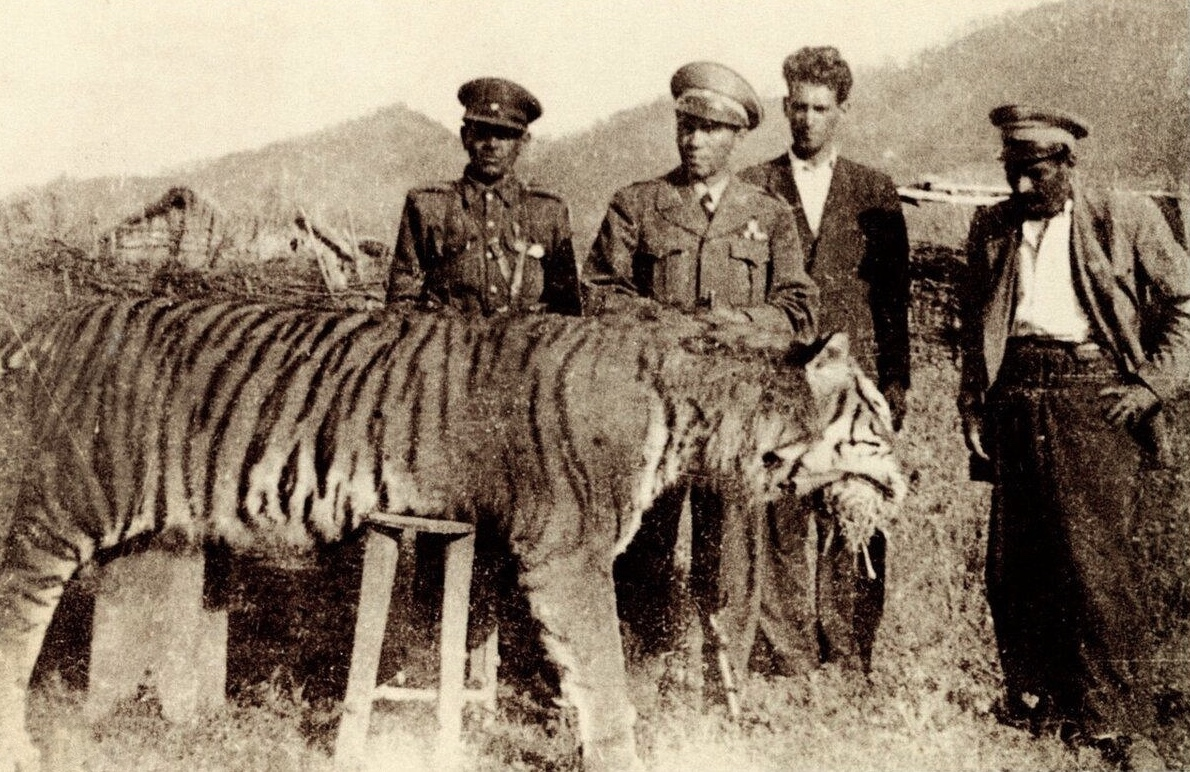
Tiger killed in northern Iran, early 1940s

The demise of the Caspian tiger began with the Russian colonisation of Turkestan during the late 19th century. Its extirpation was caused by several factors:

- Tigers were killed by large parties of sportsmen and military personnel who also hunted tiger prey species such as the Bactrian deer, and middle asian Wild boar. This wild pig's range underwent a rapid decline between the middle of the 19th century and the 1930s due to overhunting, natural disasters, and diseases such as swine fever and foot-and-mouth disease, which caused large and rapid die-offs.
- The extensive reed beds of tiger habitat were increasingly converted to cropland for planting cotton and other crops that grew well in the rich silt along rivers.
- The tiger was already vulnerable due to the restricted nature of its distribution, having been confined to watercourses within the large expanses of desert environment.

Until the early 20th century, the regular Russian army was used to clear predators from forests, around settlements, and potential agricultural lands. Until World War I, about 50 tigers were killed in the forests of Amu Darya and Piandj Rivers each year. High incentives were paid for tiger skins up to 1929. Wild pigs and deer, the prey base of tigers, were decimated by deforestation and subsistence hunting by the increasing human population along the rivers, supported by growing agricultural developments. By 1910, cotton plants were estimated to occupy nearly one-fifth of Turkestan's arable land, with about one half located in the Fergana Valley.

=== Last sightings ===
In Iraq, a tiger was killed near Mosul in 1887. In Georgia, the last known tiger was killed in 1922 near Tbilisi, after having taken domestic livestock. In China, tigers disappeared from the Tarim River basin in Xinjiang in the 1920s. In Azerbaijan, the last known tiger was killed in 1932; however, tigers were allegedly sighted in later years in the Talysh Mountains.

In Turkey, a pair of tigers was allegedly killed in the area of Selçuk in 1943. Several tiger skins found in the early 1970s near Uludere indicated the presence of a tiger population in eastern Turkey. Questionnaire surveys conducted in this region revealed that one to eight tigers were killed each year until the mid-1980s, and that tigers likely had survived in the region until the early 1990s. Due to lack of interest, in addition to security and safety reasons, no further field surveys were carried out in the area.

In Iran, the tiger’s presence was reported only in the provinces of Mazandaran, Golestan, and North Khorasan by the late 1950s. One of the last known tigers was shot in Golestan National Park in 1953. Another individual was sighted in Golestān Province in 1958. A year later, another specimen was confirmed to have been killed on a forested range of the same park. Subsequent reports persisted, including a claimed sighting by villagers in Golidagh, along the Iranian–Turkmenian border in 1973, and another in 1971, when a tiger was reportedly seen in the mountain forests near Ramsar during a deer hunting trip. In 1974, in the Parvar region, experts from the department of environmental conservation discovered twenty footprints measuring 12 cm in length and 14.5 cm in width, preserved in both snow and gravel. Attempts were made to lure the owner of the footprints with bait, but no tiger ever appeared.

In Turkmenistan, the last known tiger was killed in January 1954 in the Sumbar River valley in the Kopet-Dag Range. It reportedly disappeared in the Manasi River basin in the Tian Shan Range west of Ürümqi in the 1960s. The last record from the lower reaches of the Amu Darya river was an unconfirmed observation in 1968 near Nukus in the Aral Sea area. By the early 1970s, tigers disappeared from the river's lower reaches and the Pyzandh Valley in the Turkmen-Uzbek-Afghan border region. The Piandj River area between Afghanistan and Tajikistan was a stronghold of the Caspian tiger until the late 1960s. The latest sighting of a tiger in the Afghan-Tajik border area dates to 1998 in the Babatag Range. Two tigers were captured in April 1997 in Afghanistan's Laghman Province.

In Kazakhstan, the last Caspian tiger was recorded in 1948, in the environs of the Ili River, the last known stronghold in the region of Lake Balkhash. In May 2006, a Kazakh hunter claimed to have seen a female Caspian tiger with cubs near Lake Balkhash. However, this sighting remains uncertain and unconfirmed.

== Behaviour and ecology ==
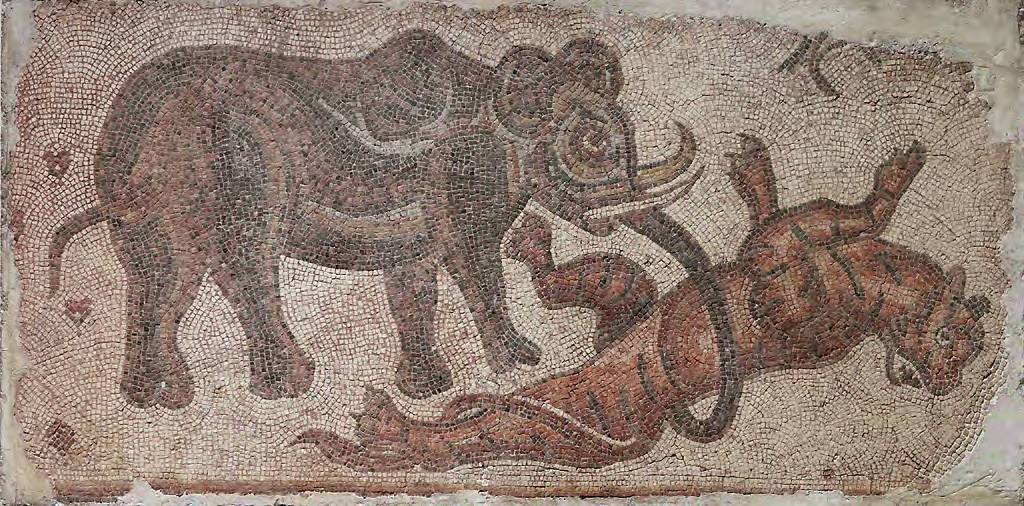
Mosaic of an elephant attacking a tiger, from Roman Syria, which occupied parts of what is now Anatolia and Mesopotamia

Caspian tigers possibly followed migratory ungulates from one pasture to another; wild boars and cervids probably formed their main prey base. In many regions of Central Asia, Bactrian deer and roe deer were important prey species, as well as Caspian red deer and goitered gazelle in Iran; Eurasian golden jackals, jungle cats, locusts, and other small mammals in the lower Amu Darya River area; Saiga antelopes, wild horses and Persian onagers in the Miankaleh Peninsula; Turkmenian kulans, Mongolian wild asses, and mountain sheep in the Zhana-Darya and around the Aral Sea; and Manchurian wapiti and moose in the area of Lake Baikal. They caught fish in flooded areas and irrigation channels. In winter, they frequently attacked dogs and livestock straying away from herds. They preferred drinking water from rivers, and drank from lakes in seasons when water was less brackish.

During an expedition carried out in 1886–1887, numerous wild boars were observed migrating from the deserts and mountains of Afghanistan to the harvested fields along the Kushk River that were followed by tigers. In 1930, tigers moved up the Ili River after a decline of the wild boar population; in 1945, tigers followed a mass migration of wild boars along the shore of the Aral Sea from the Amu Darya delta into the lower reaches of the Syr Darya. Hunters who tracked tigers to Lake Balkhash observed a decrease in their numbers there, which coincided with the expansion of human activities and the migration of wild boar toward the Chu River. A few wild boars inflicted severe injuries on tigers.

=== Mortality and health ===
A few anecdotal accounts indicate that Caspian tigers died from the blows of wild boar tusks. In the Karauzyak region of Uzbekistan, a witnessed battle ended with the deaths of both animals as a result of severe wounds. A similar outcome was recorded in the autumn of 1845 in the talysh forests.

Two tigers in southwestern Tajikistan harbored 5–7 tapeworms (Taenia bubesei) in their small and large intestines.

== Conservation ==
In 1938, Tigrovaya Balka was the first protected area in Tajikistan established in the lower reaches of Vakhsh River between the Panj and Kofarnihon Rivers; it was apparently the last refuge of the Caspian tiger. A tiger was seen there in 1958. After 1947, tigers were legally protected in the Soviet Union.

In Iran, Caspian tigers had been protected since 1957, with heavy fines for shooting. In the early 1970s, biologists from the Department of Environment searched several years for Caspian tigers in the uninhabited areas of Caspian forests, but did not find any evidence of their presence.

=== In captivity ===
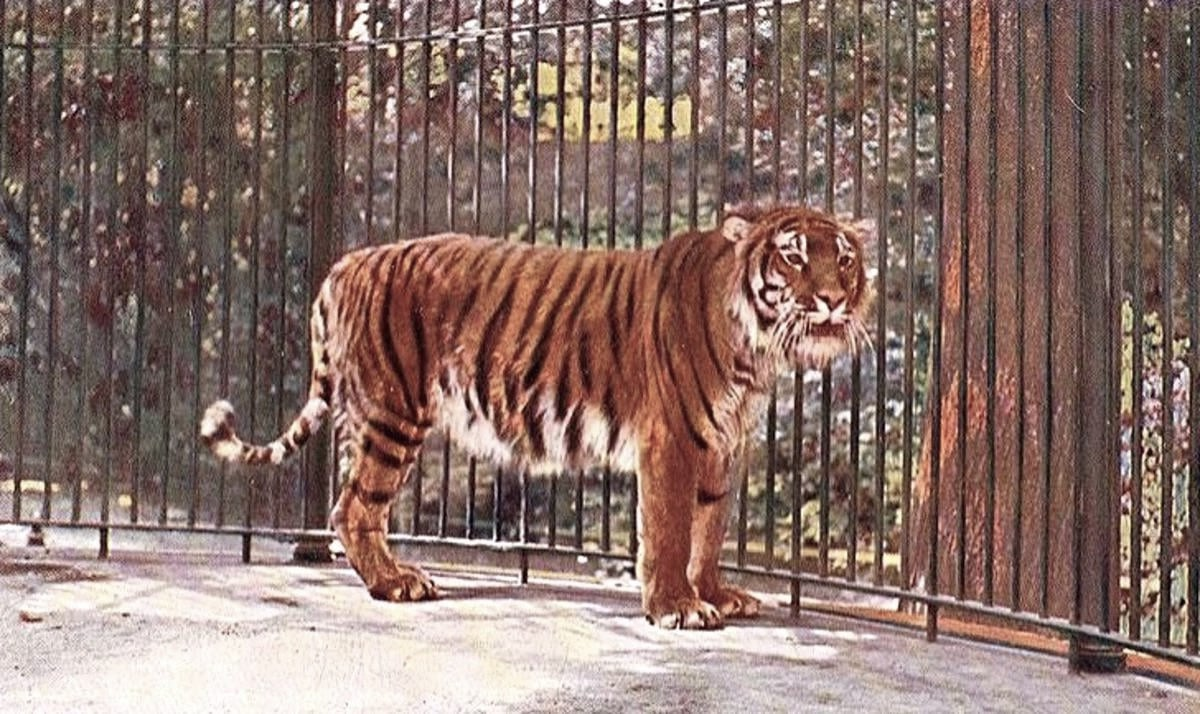
Colour-enhanced photo of the captive tiger in Berlin Zoo, 1899

A tiger from the Caucasus was housed at Berlin Zoo in the late 19th century. A tigress caught in Turkestan was presented to London Zoo on 12 December 1885. DNA from a tiger caught in northern Iran and housed at Moscow Zoo in the 20th century was used in the genetic test that established the Caspian tiger's close genetic relationship with the Siberian tiger. This tigress lived from 1924 to 1942 and was presented to the Soviet ambassador in Iran. Another tigress kept at Tierpark Hagenbeck in Hamburg between 1955 and 1960 was probably the last Caspian tiger in captivity. An individual was born in Brookfield Zoo Chicago on 7 May 1935 and was still living on 1 January 1948.

=== Reintroduction project ===
Stimulated by the finding that the Siberian tiger is the closest relative of the Caspian tiger, discussions started as to whether the Siberian tiger could be appropriate for reintroduction into a safe place in Central Asia, where the Caspian tiger once roamed. The Amu Darya delta was proposed as a potential site for such a project, but a feasibility study revealed that this region is not large enough for a viable tiger population of about 100 animals; they would require at least 5,000 km^{2} (1,900 sq mi) of large tracts of contiguous habitat with rich prey populations.

Preliminary ecological surveys revealed that natural habitat suitable for tigers has been preserved in some small populated areas in Central Asia. In September 2024, two captive tigers from the Netherlands arrived at the Ile-Balkhash State Nature Reserve in Kazakhstan. Another three to four tigers from Russia were expected to be introduced. On 31 July 2026, a female Amur tiger was released into the nature reserve, and three other individuals are still under observation.

== In culture ==
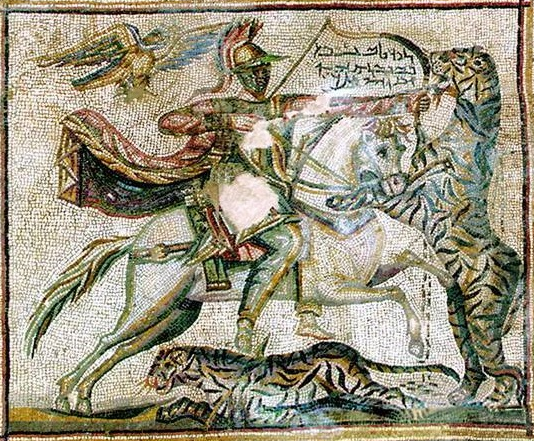
The 'Tiger Mosaic' in Palmyra

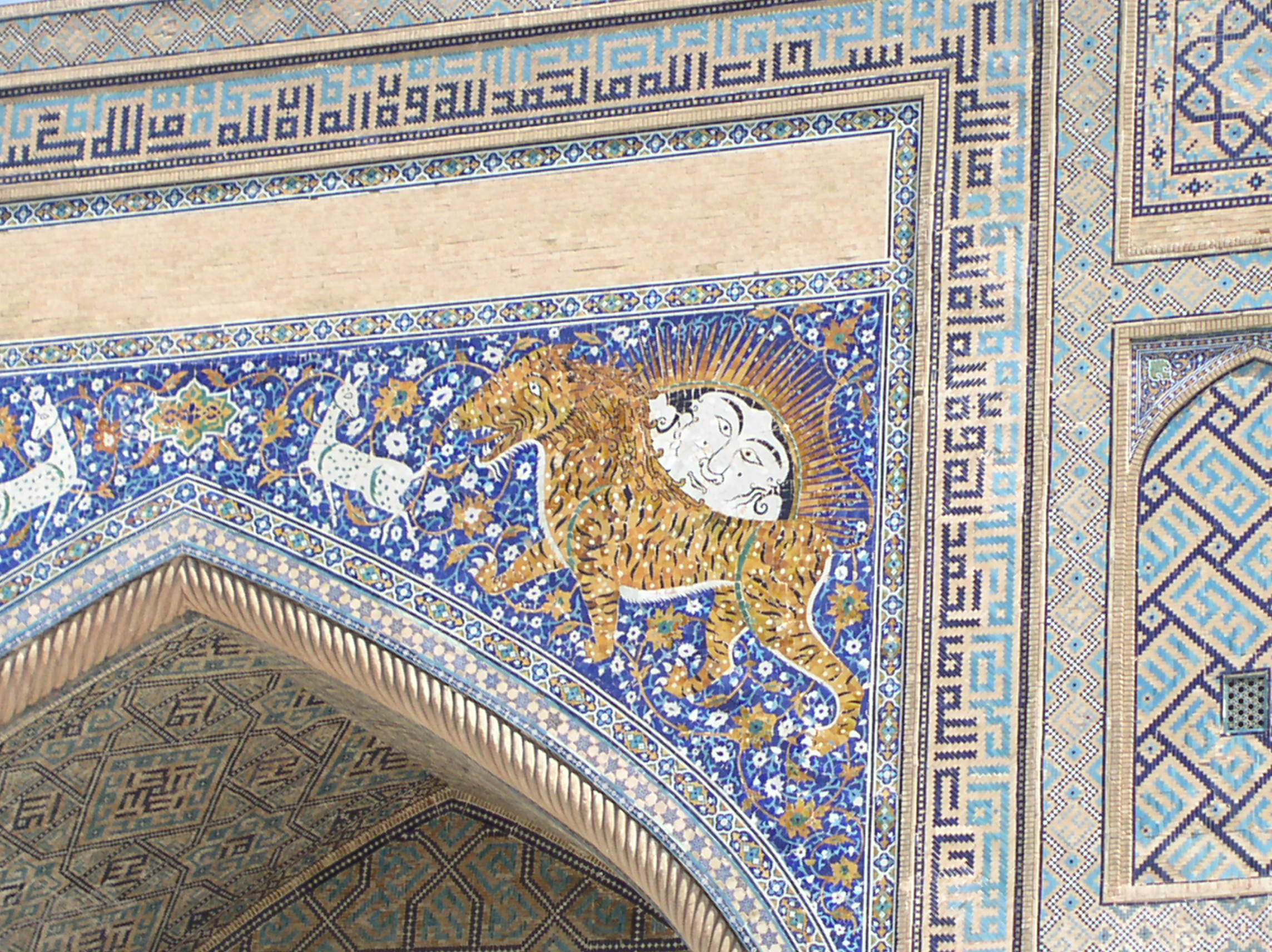
Portal of the Sher-Dor Madrasa in Samarkand depicting a tiger

In the Roman Empire, tigers and other large animals imported from Africa and Asia were used during gladiatorial games. In the Taurus Mountains, stone traps were used to capture leopards and tigers.

In the Fables of Pilpay, the tiger is described as furious and avid to rule over wilderness.

The babr (Persian: ببر, tiger) features in Persian and Central Asian culture. The name "Babr-e Māzandarān" is sometimes given to a prominent wrestler. A Syrian mosaic in Palmyra depicts the Sasanians as tigers, possibly commemorating the victory of the Palmyrene King Odaenathus over Shapur I. The inscription on the mosaic conceals an earlier one that read: (Mrn), which is a title used by Odaenathus. It possibly celebrates Odaenathus' victory over the Persians, the archer representing Odaenathus and the tigers the Persians; Odaenathus is about to be crowned with victory by the eagle flying above him.

== See also ==
- Tiger populations
- Bornean tiger
  - Prehistoric tigers: Panthera tigris soloensis
  - Panthera tigris trinilensis
  - Panthera tigris acutidens
- Holocene extinction
