= Stigmella roborella =

Scientific classification
- Kingdom: Animalia
- Phylum: Arthropoda
- Clade: Pancrustacea
- Class: Insecta
- Order: Lepidoptera
- Family: Nepticulidae
- Genus: Stigmella
- Species: S. roborella

Binomial name
- Stigmella roborella (Johansson, 1971)

Synonyms
- Nepticula roborella Johansson, 1971

Species of moth

Stigmella roborella is a moth of the family Nepticulidae. It is found throughout Europe and in south-west Asia. In Europe, it has been recorded from nearly every country, except Albania, Belarus, Bosnia and Herzegovina, Bulgaria, Ireland, Moldova, Portugal, Romania and Yugoslavia. It has recently been recorded from Georgia, Macedonia and Turkey.

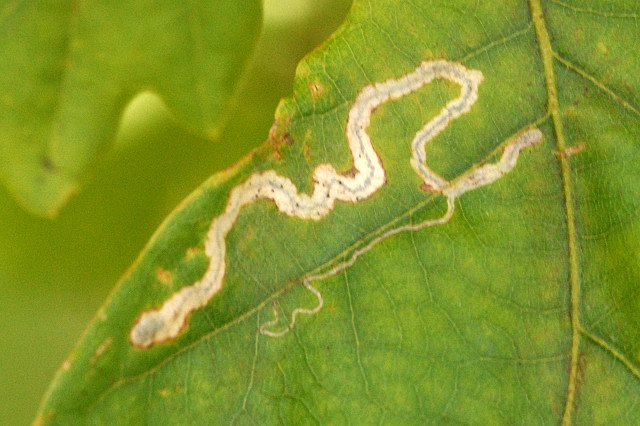
Stigmella roborella mine

The wingspan is 5–7 millimetres (0.20–0.28 in). Adults are on wing from April to September.

The larvae feed on Quercus castaneifolia, Quercus cerris, Quercus petraea, Quercus pubescens, Quercus robur and Quercus rubra. They mine the leaves of their host plant.
