= Argu Tagh =

Mountain range in Kazakhstan and China

Coordinates: 42°00′N 81°00′E

For main article, see Pamir Mountains.

Argu Tagh (Turkic Argu Tag and Kumysh Tag meaning "Silver Mountains", Chinese Qinling meaning "Onion Mountains") is a mountain range separating the Turan Depression from the Xinjiang region of China. The Argu Tagh range is a northern extension of Kunlun Mountains, it continues northeast to the basin of Ili River, northwest beyond the Balkhash Lake, westward and northeast from Kashgar, stretching along the southern edge of the Tarim Basin, and forming the southern edge of the Taklamakan Desert. As "Onion Mountains", the Argu Tagh range was frequently mentioned in the Chinese Annals starting in the 2nd century BC, played a prominent role in the routes of the ancient Silk Road, and was a theater of many historical military and political events.
