= Ostayır =

Ostayır Ostair
- Village
- Ostair
- Location within Azerbaijan
- Coordinates: 38°54′56″N 48°12′56″E
- Country: Azerbaijan
- Rayon: Yardymli
- Elevation: 1,020 m (3,350 ft)

Population
  - Total: 1,611
- Time zone: UTC+4 (AZT)
  - Summer (DST): UTC+5 (AZT)

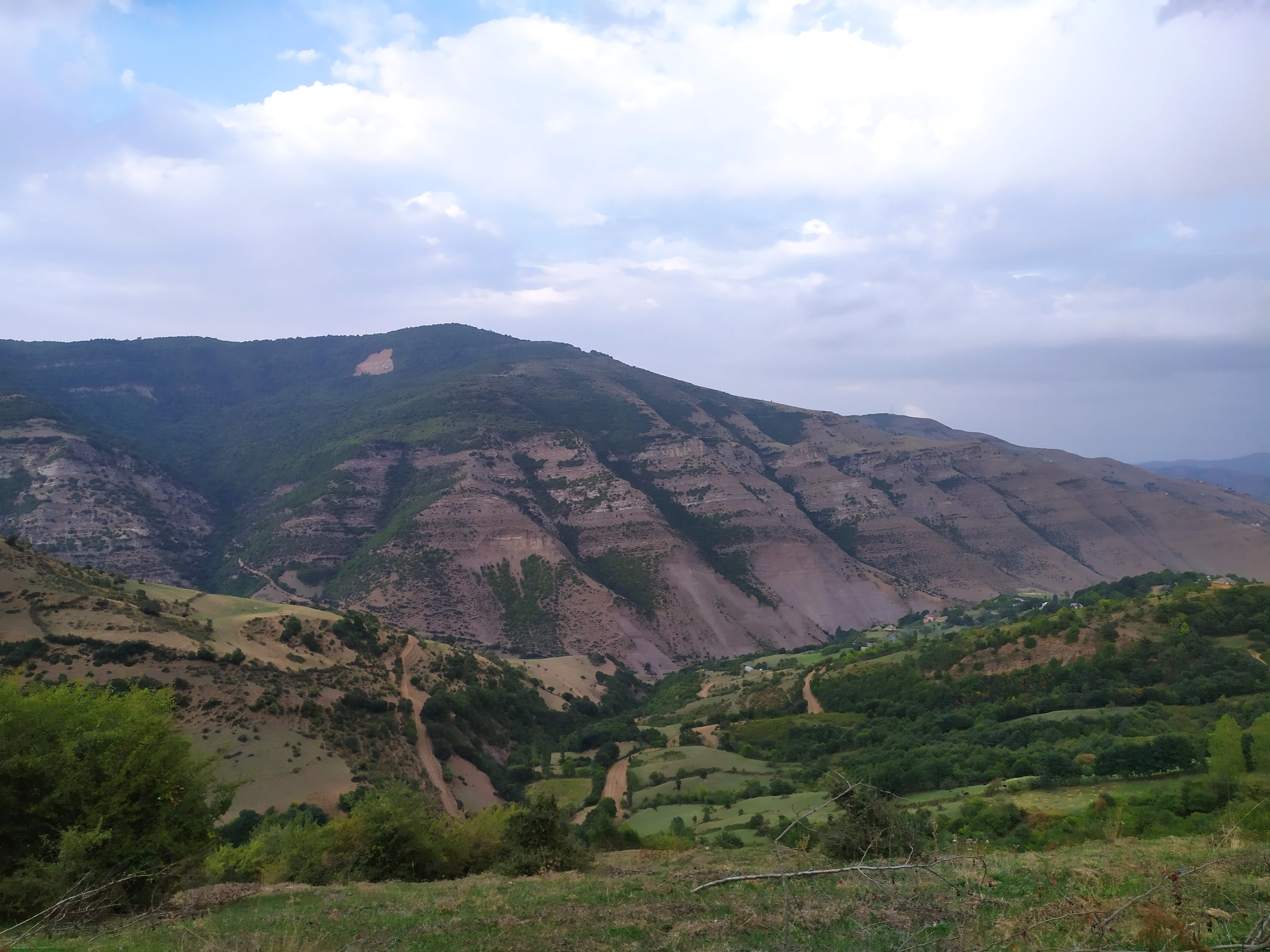
View from hills surrounding Ostayir village

Ostayır (also, Ostair) is a village and municipality in the Yardymli Rayon of Azerbaijan, in the southern part of the country, 220 km southwest of the capital Baku. This village has a population of 1,611. Population sustains itself by agricultural activities.

Village is surrounded by forests, hills and small rocky ravines, in 1020 m elevation. The climate in the area is temperate. Average annual temperature in the neighborhood is 12 °C . The warmest month is August, when the average temperature is 25 °C, and the coldest is January, with 0 °C. Average annual rainfall is 755 millimeters. The wettest month is October, with an average of 123 mm of rainfall, and the driest is July, with 16 mm of rainfall.

Ostayır is located in close proximity to Azerbaijan - Iran border.

Ostayır

Climate chart (precipitation, max. and min. temperature)
J	F	M	A	M	J	J	A	S	O	N	D
78 5 −6	43 8 −5	41 15 0	47 18 3	65 23 9	47 28 14	16 31 14	23 34 16	69 29 12	123 19 7	120 13 2	82 6 −3
- █ Average max. and min. temperatures in °C
- █ Precipitation totals in mm
Imperial conversion
J	F	M	A	M	J	J	A	S	O	N	D
3.1 41 21	1.7 46 23	1.6 59 32	1.9 64 37	2.6 73 48	1.9 82 57	0.6 88 57	0.9 93 61	2.7 84 54	4.8 66 45	4.7 55 36	3.2 43 27
- █ Average max. and min. temperatures in °F
- █ Precipitation totals in inches
