= Stigmella samiatella =

Scientific classification
- Kingdom: Animalia
- Phylum: Arthropoda
- Class: Insecta
- Order: Lepidoptera
- Family: Nepticulidae
- Genus: Stigmella
- Species: S. samiatella

Binomial name
- Stigmella samiatella (Zeller, 1839)

Synonyms
- Lyonetia samiatella Zeller, 1839; Nepticula samiatella (Zeller, 1839)

Species of moth

Stigmella samiatella is a moth of the family Nepticulidae. It is found throughout Europe and south-western Asia. It has recently been recorded from Georgia and Russia.

The wingspan is 5–7 mm. Adults are on wing from April to September and in October in southern Europe. In Britain it is believed to be (partly) univoltine, but in the Netherlands and Sweden it is clearly bivoltine.

The larvae feed on Castanea sativa, Quercus castaneifolia, Quercus cerris, Quercus frainetto, Quercus pedunculiflora, Quercus petraea, Quercus pubescens and Quercus robur. They mine the leaves of their host plant.
