= Lankaran Lowland =

Coordinates: 39°07′17″N 48°42′27″E

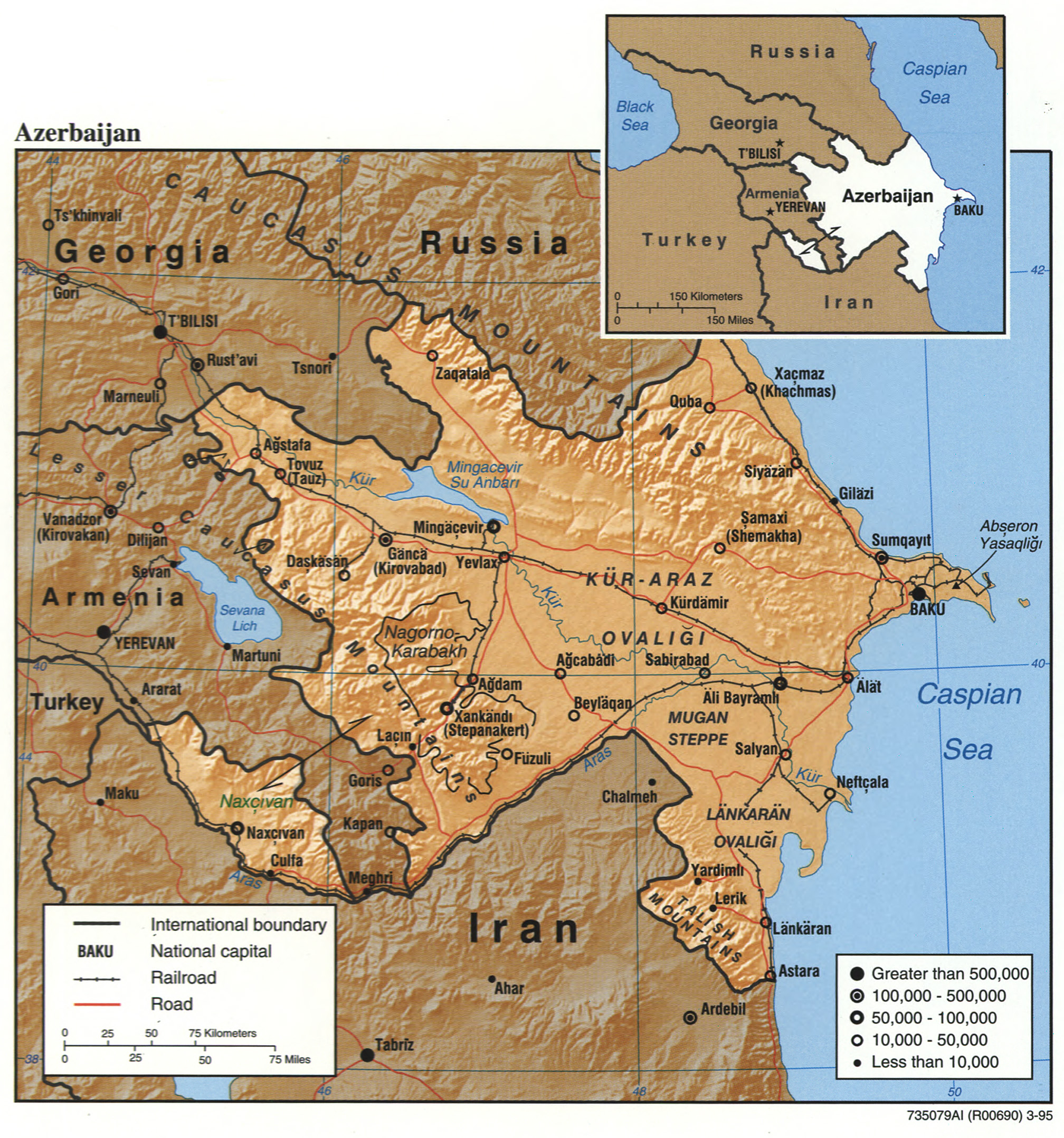
Map of Azerbaijan with the Lankaran Lowland located and depicted in the southeast

The Lankaran Lowland (Azerbaijani: Lənkəran ovalığı) is a narrow strip of lowland in southeastern Azerbaijan along the Caspian Sea. It is the southward extension of the Kura-Aras Lowland which in itself is an extension of the Aral–Caspian Depression. It is named after the city of Lankaran.

== Geography ==
It joins the Mughan plain in the North and is bounded by the Caspian Sea from the East, the Talysh Mountains southwards and reaches Iran in the area of Astara by the sea and westwards. The plain part of the Hirkan National Park ("Moscow Forest") lies within the Lankaran Lowland. The Moscow Forest is the only preserved part of the Caspian Hyrcanian mixed forests which covered most of the lowland, that was later cleared for agriculture. However, there is a reforestation program of the lowland, on a designated non-forested lot which is the only non-cultivated land on the plain, in order to (partially because the Lankaran Lowland is far too valuable for its agricultural productivity for Azerbaijan, to be given up for reforestation) restore the ecology to its previous forested state. This lot will become the second forest in the lowland after the Moscow Forest and once it is reforested, it will become an additional part of the Hirkan National Park in the lowland.

== Climate ==
The lowland with its humid semi-subtropical climate is a place of tea, rice and citrus plantations. The maximum annual precipitation in Lankaran Lowland is between 1,600 mm to 1,800 mm, which along the Talysh Mountains is the highest precipitation in Azerbaijan.

== Fauna ==
Animal	Name	Picture
Sultan chicken	Porphyrio poliocephalus	
Glossy ibis	Plegadis falcinellus	
Flamingo	Phoenicopterus ruber	
Black francolin	Franco linus francolinus	
Swan	Cygnus	
Anser (bird)	Anser	
Eurasian coot	Fulica atra	

== See also ==
- The Caspian Hyrcanian mixed forests' ecoregion, an area of lush lowland and montane forests (subtropical and temperate rainforests) that partially cover the Lankaran Lowland.
- The Caspian tiger, which used to occur in this area.
