= Babatag Range =

Mountain range of Tajikistan

Coordinates: 37.9846°N 68.1697°E

The Babatag Range is a mountain range of Tajikistan. It lies in the west of Tajikistan, south of Hisor. It is where the Caspian tiger was last seen, in 1998.
