= Turan Depression =

Low-lying desert basin in Central Asia

Coordinates: 41.8333°N 59.9667°E

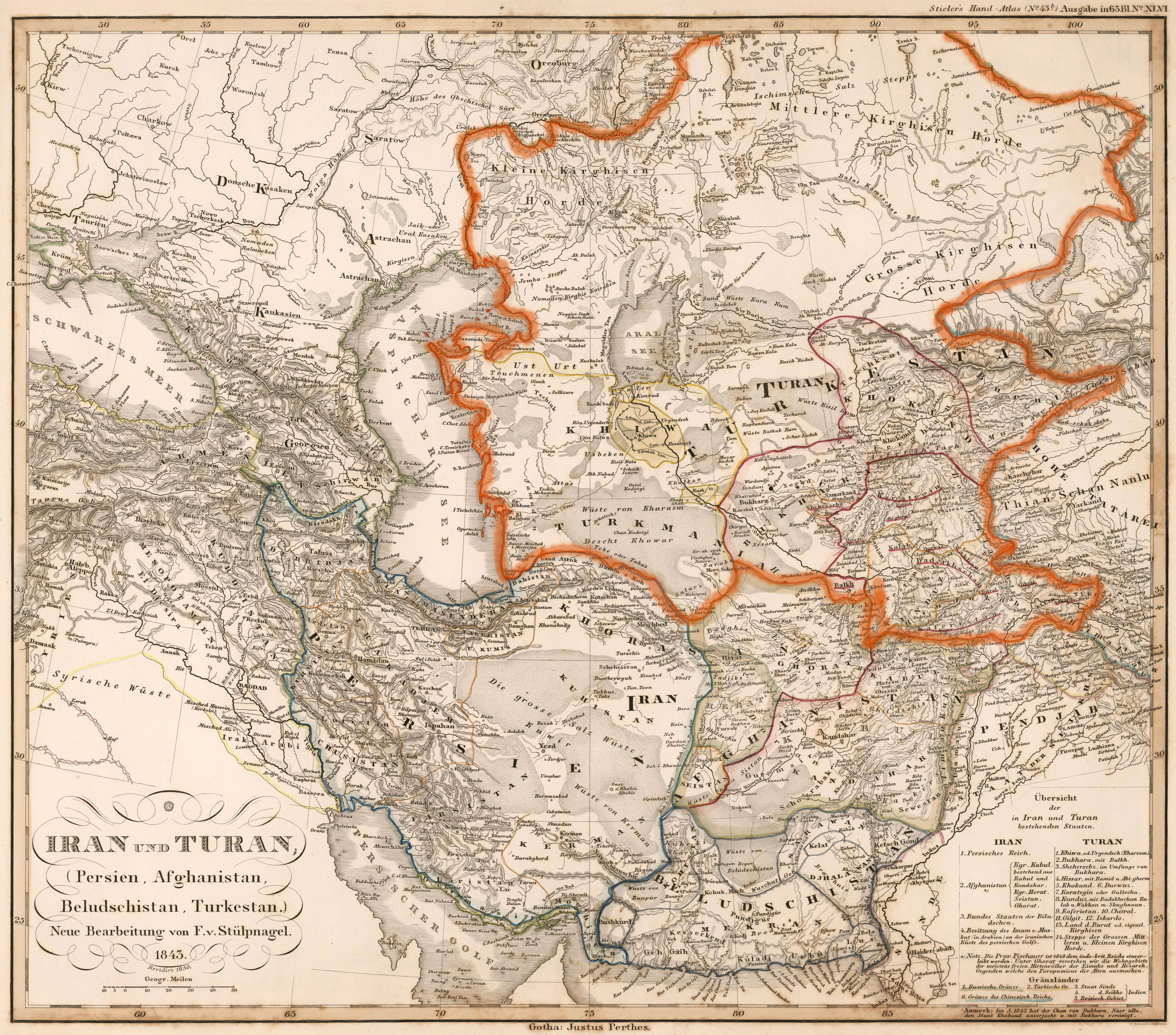
Turan Depression (area enclosed by orange line)

The Turan Depression, Turan Lowland or Turanian Basin is a low-lying desert basin region stretching from southern Turkmenistan through Uzbekistan to Kazakhstan.

== Geography ==
The lowland region lies to the east of the Caspian Sea and southeast of the Aral Sea in the vast Aral–Caspian Depression but extends to parts above sea level as well. It is one of the largest expanses of sand in the world, covering an area of around 3 million km^{2}. On average, the region receives less than 15 inches (380 mm) of rainfall per year. The Karakum desert lies at the southern portion of the Turan Lowlands.

The part of the depression adjacent to the Aral Sea is drainless. It includes a network of temporary streams usually ending in sor salt flats, which seasonally become salt lakes.

Three of the largest cities in the Turan Depression are Daşoguz in Turkmenistan, Nukus in Uzbekistan, and Urganch, also in Uzbekistan. Akjagaýa in Turkmenistan is 267 feet (81 meters) below sea level. The Amu Darya River runs in a southeast–north-westerly direction through the lowlands.

In the Pliocene and Pleistocene, the territory of the modern Turan depression was the bottom of the vast Turan Sea, which was divided into the modern Caspian and Aral seas about ten thousand years ago.

== See also ==
- Kazakh semi-desert
- Turgay Depression
