= Kura-Aras lowland =

Depression in central-southern Azerbaijan

Coordinates: 41.1667°N 45.8333°E

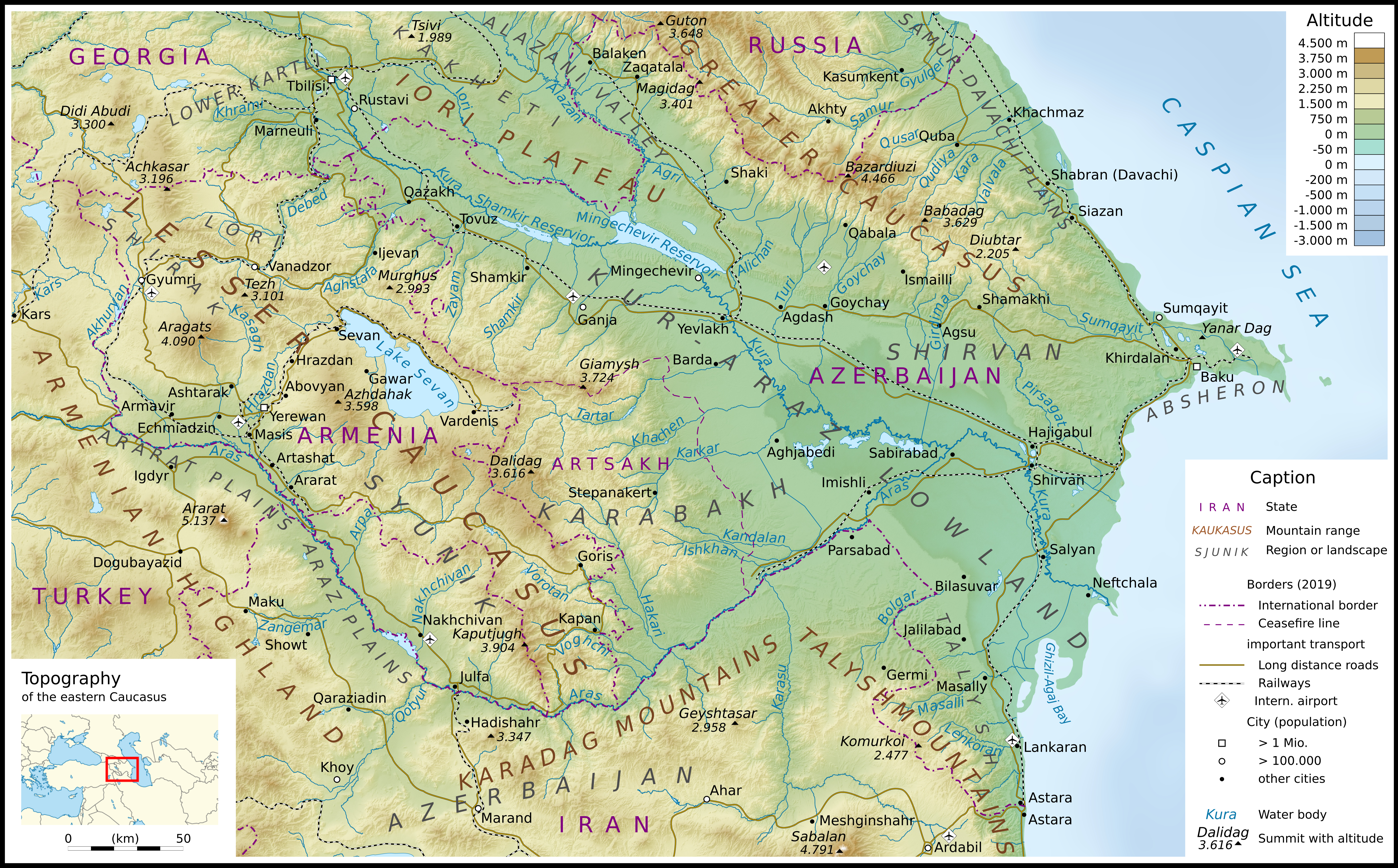
Topographic map of Armenia and Azerbaijan, Kura-Aras Lowland stretching from Northwest to Southeast.

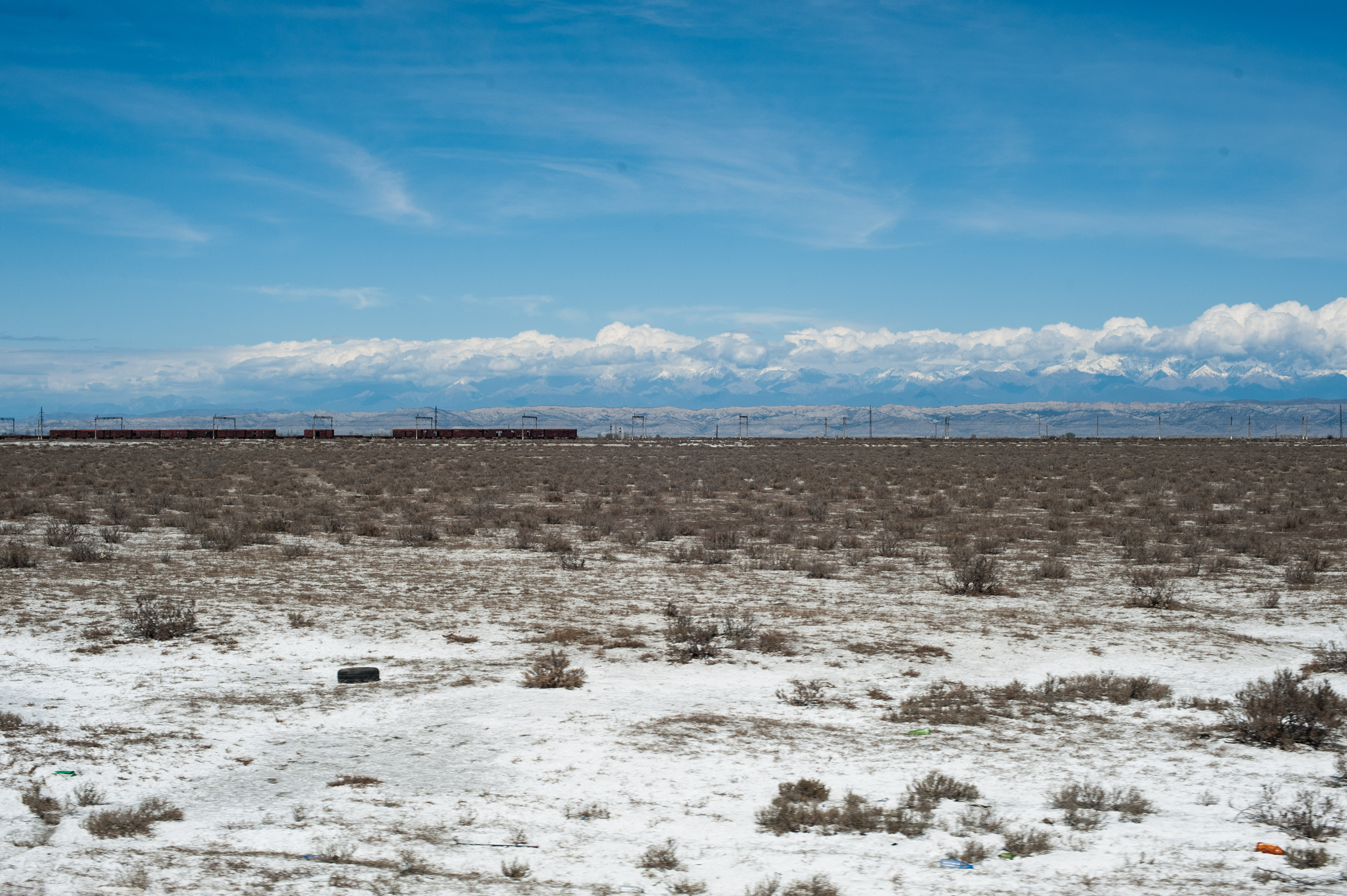
Kur-Araz

The Kura-Aras Lowland, Kura-Aras Depression or Kura-Aras Basin (Azerbaijani: Kür-Araz ovalığı) is a vast depression in central-southern Azerbaijan defined by the valleys of the Kura River and Aras River. It is situated by the western shore of the Caspian Sea and is part of the Aral-Caspian Depression. It is delimited by the Greater Caucasus from the north, Lesser Caucasus from the west and the Talysh Mountains from the south. The name is derived from the names of the two rivers in the area: the Kura and the Aras.

== See also ==
- Kura–Araxes culture or Kur–Araz culture, Bronze Age culture from the region
- Trans-Caucasus
