= Köhnə Zuvand =

Coordinates: 39°00′N 48°29′E

Köhnə Zuvand is a village and municipality in the Masally Rayon of Azerbaijan. It has a population of 625.
