= Aral–Caspian Depression =

Lowland depression

Aral-Caspian Depression
- Depression
- Coordinates: 41°50′N 59°58′E

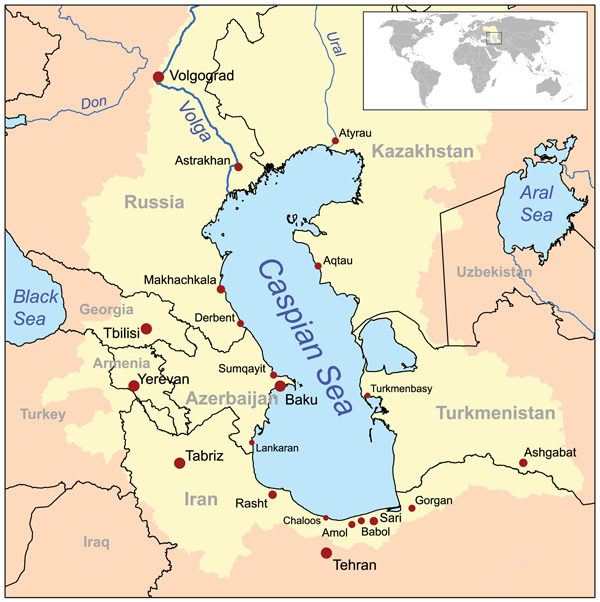
Map of the Caspian Sea and Aral Sea, yellow shading indicates Caspian Sea drainage basin

The Aral–Caspian Depression is a lowland depression straddling Europe and Asia around the Aral Sea and Northern Caspian Sea. Its northernmost part is called the Caspian Depression. The desert part to the east of the Caspian Depression and Caspian is called the Turan Depression. In Azerbaijan, the Kura-Aras Lowland is part of the Aral–Caspian Depression. Its parts lie in Azerbaijan, Russia, Kazakhstan, Uzbekistan, and Turkmenistan.
