= Yeni Zuvand =

- Location within Azerbaijan
- Coordinates: 39°00′17″N 48°28′41″E
- Country: Azerbaijan
- Rayon: Masally
- Time zone: UTC+4 (AZT)
  - Summer (DST): UTC+5 (AZT)

Yeni Zuvand (known as Zuvandlı until 2001) is a village and municipality in the Masally Rayon of Azerbaijan. It has a population of 888.
