= Talysh Mountains =

Mountain range in Azerbaijan and Iran

Coordinates: 38.7°N 48.3°E

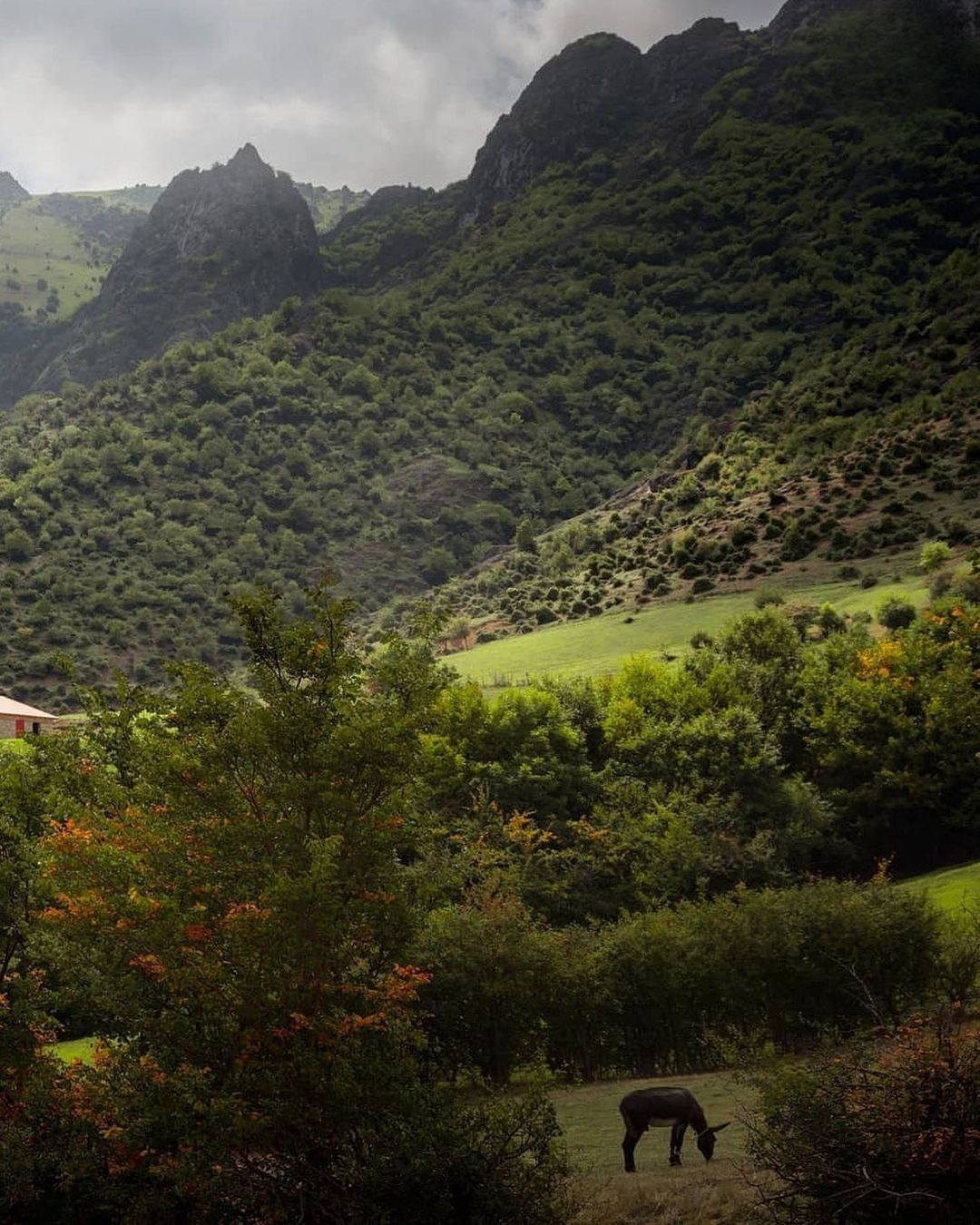
- Mountains in the Lerik District of Azerbaijan

Highest point
- Peak: Kömürgöy
- Elevation: 2,493 m (8,179 ft)

Geography
- Countries: Azerbaijan; Iran

Talysh Mountains (Talysh: Tolışə bandon; Azerbaijani: Talış dağları; Persian: کوه‌های تالش, romanized: kuh-hâye tâleš) is a mountain range in the Lankaran-Astara Economic region of Azerbaijan and the Ardabil and Gilan Provinces of Iran.

== Geography and geology ==
The Talysh Mountains extend southeastward from the Lankaran Lowland in southeastern Azerbaijan to the lower part of the Sefid River in northwestern Iran. They reach a general elevation of around 2,400 m (7,900 ft), with their highest peak, Mount Kömürgöy, rising to 2,493 m (8,179 ft).

Geologically, the Talysh Mountain Range is made mainly of the Late Cretaceous volcano-sedimentary deposits with a strip of Paleozoic rocks and a band of Triassic and Jurassic rocks in the southern parts, both in a north-west-southeast direction.

== Ecology ==
The maximum annual precipitation in the Talysh Mountains is between 1,600 mm to 1,800 mm, which along the Lankaran Lowland is the highest precipitation in both Azerbaijan and Iran. The humid semi-subtropical coastal lowlands along the Caspian Sea, including the Lankaran Lowland, lie at the eastern base of the mountains.

The Talysh Mountains are covered by lowland and montane forests. The area is part of the Caspian Hyrcanian mixed forests ecoregion.

The Caspian tiger used to occur in the Talysh Mountains.

== See also ==
- Lankaran Lowland — see for map of range
