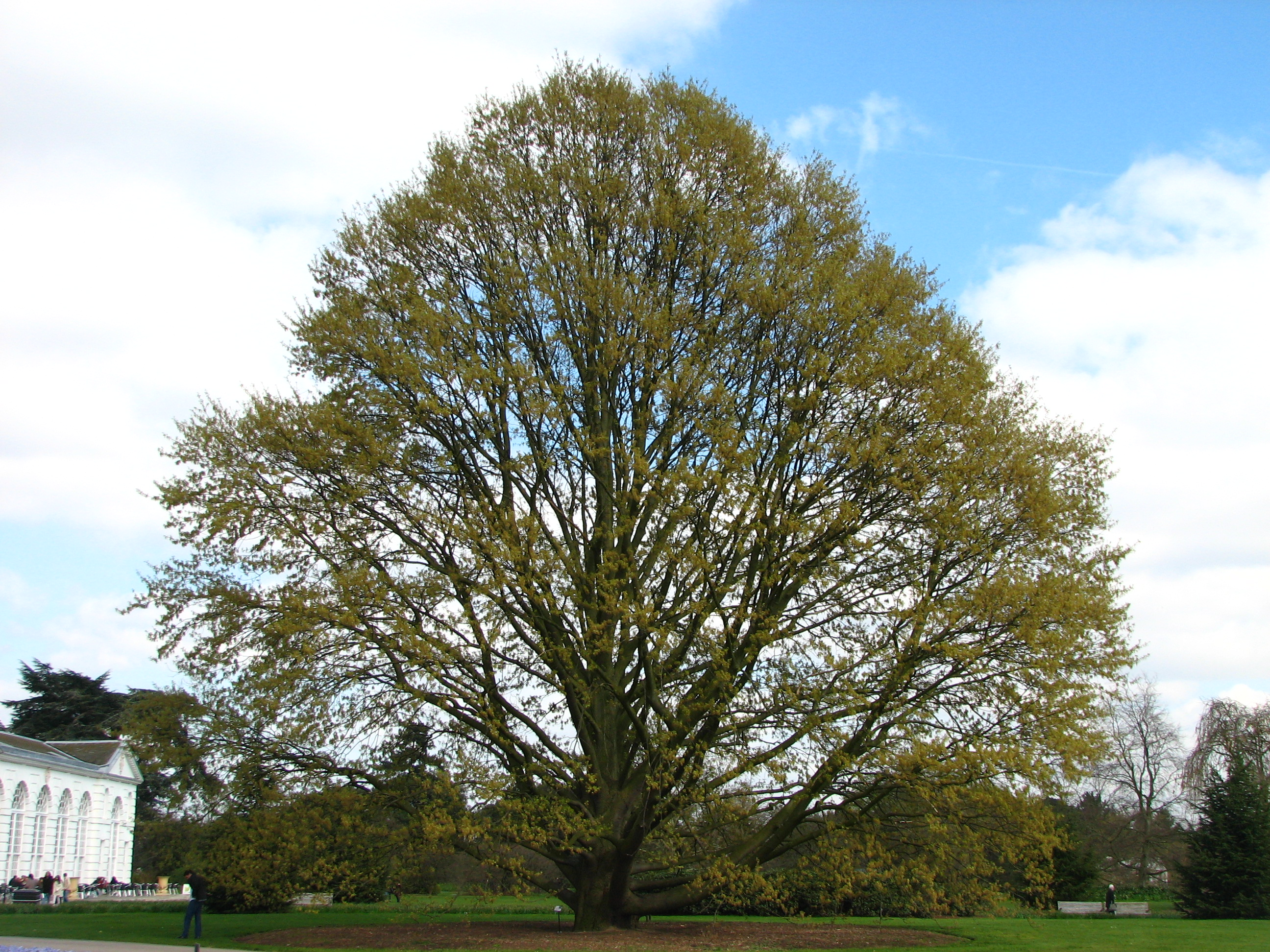

Conservation status
- Near Threatened (IUCN 3.1)

Scientific classification
- Kingdom: Plantae
- Clade: Embryophytes
- Clade: Tracheophytes
- Clade: Spermatophytes
- Clade: Angiosperms
- Clade: Eudicots
- Clade: Rosids
- Order: Fagales
- Family: Fagaceae
- Genus: Quercus
- Subgenus: Quercus subg. Cerris
- Section: Quercus sect. Cerris
- Species: Q. castaneifolia

Binomial name
- Quercus castaneifolia C.A.Mey.

Synonyms
- List: Quercus aegilops var. castaneifolia (C.A.Mey.) K.Koch; Quercus aitchisoniana A.Camus; Quercus sintenisiana O.Schwarz

= Quercus castaneifolia =

Chestnut-leaved oak

Species of oak tree

Quercus castaneifolia, the chestnut-leaved oak, is a species of oak in the turkey oak section Quercus sect. Cerris. It is native to the Caucasus and Alborz mountains of Iran, and resembles the closely related Turkey Oak in appearance.

== Description ==
Q. castaneifolia is a deciduous tree growing up to 35 metres (115 feet) tall, with a trunk up to 2.5 m (8 ft) in diameter (exceptionally up to 50 m tall with a trunk up to 3.5 m across). The leaves are 10–20 centimetres (4–8 inches) long and 3–5 cm wide, with 10–15 small, regular triangular lobes on each side. The flowers are wind-pollinated catkins; the fruit is an acorn, maturing about 18 months after pollination, 2–3 cm long and 1.5–2 cm broad, bicoloured with an orange basal half grading to a green-brown tip; the acorn cup is 2 cm deep, densely covered in soft 4–8 millimetres (1/8–3/8 inch) long 'mossy' bristles. The acorns are very bitter, but are eaten by jays and pigeons; squirrels usually only eat them when other food sources have been exhausted.

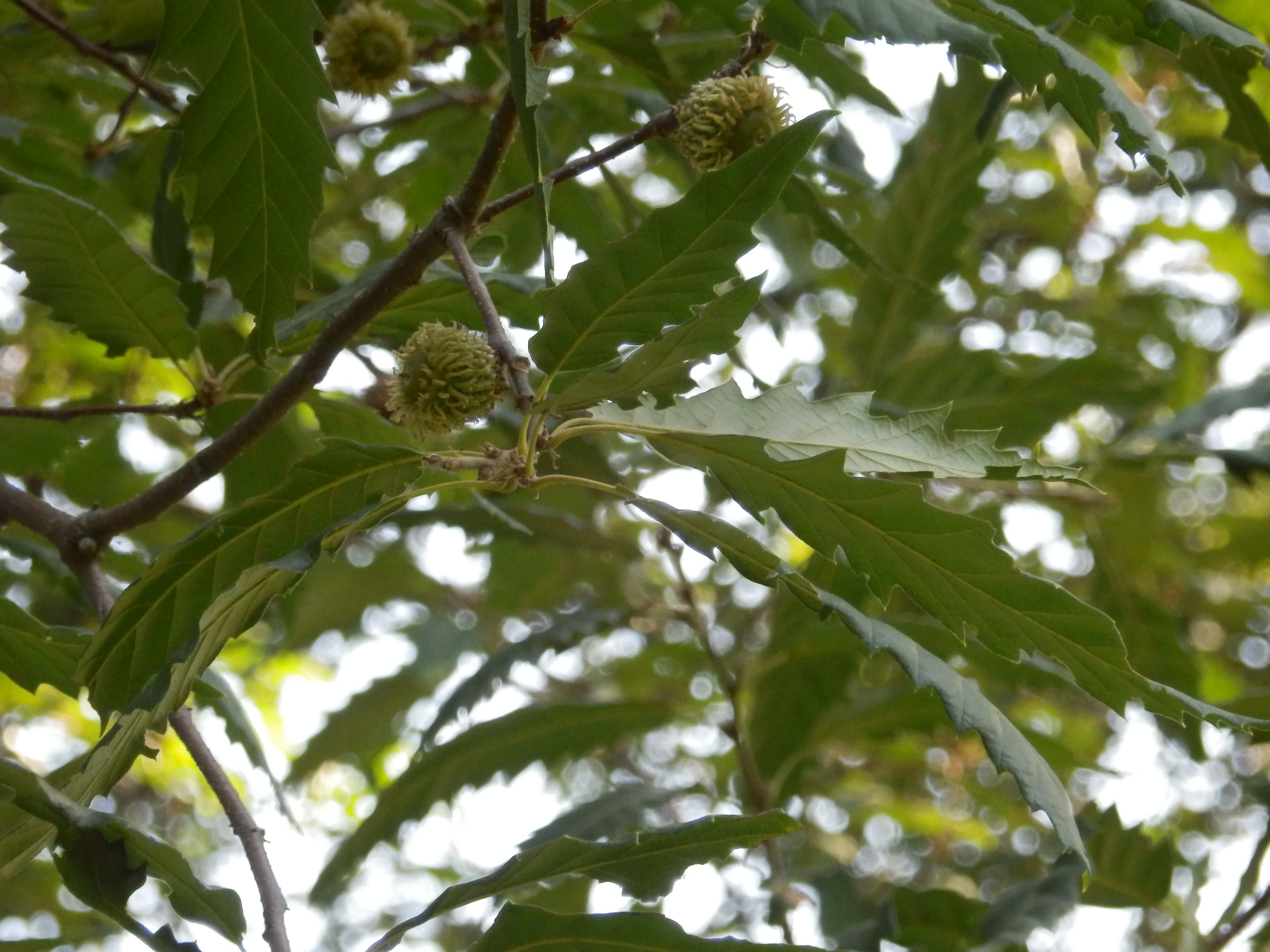
Fruit

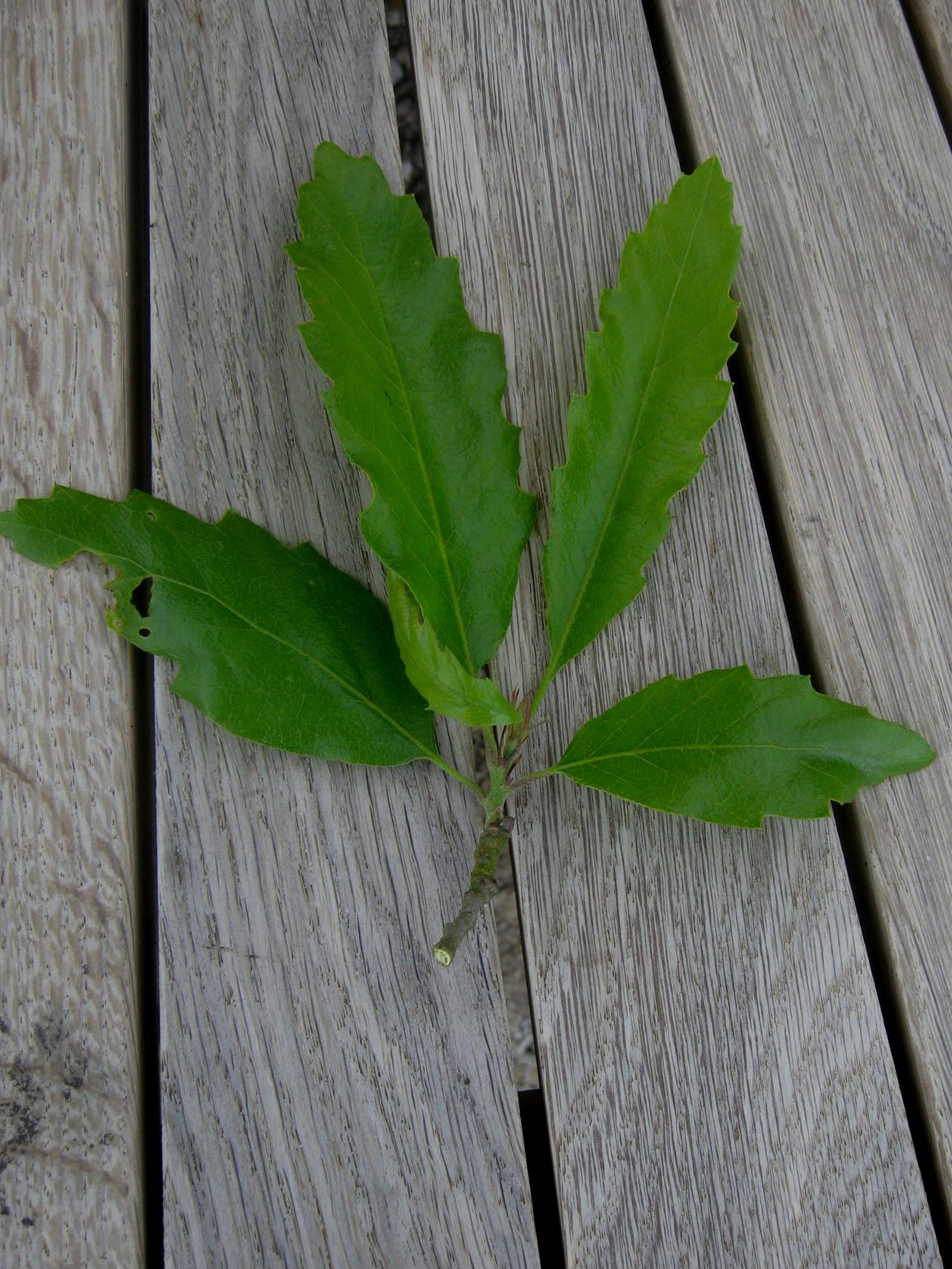
Leaves

== Cultivation ==
The tree was introduced to England in 1846, but remains relatively rare in collections despite being a vigorous grower. A tree from the original introduction is at the Royal Botanic Gardens, Kew, another survives at the Harlow Carr arboretum in Yorkshire.

The cultivar Quercus castaneifolia 'Green Spire' has been selected for its erect growth.

== Notable specimens ==
A specimen of Quercus castaneifolia found in the Hyrcanian forest of northern Iran on 29. April 2021 by Alireza Naqinezhad is considered to be the tallest oak in the world. It has a height of 60.4m, a diameter of 4.9m, and a circumference of 22m. The finding was published in a tweet by Pieter De Frenne, professor of forestry at the faculty of Bioscience Engineering at Ghent University.
