= Mass media in Tajikistan =

Mass media in Tajikistan are not independent of the authoritarian Emomali Rahmon regime. Independent media are repressed.

For most of the population, radio and television are the most important sources of information. During the civil war (1992–97), the Emomali Rahmon government severely repressed both broadcast and print media; since that time, neither has recovered independent operations. In 2006, six government television stations and 18 private stations were in operation, but most of the latter depended on government transmission equipment. Although the law requires registration of independent broadcast outlets, some unlicensed stations have operated. Russian channels are received by satellite, and most regions receive one of the two national television channels. Radio stations broadcast in Persian, Russian, Tajik, and Uzbek. In 2000, there were 141 radios and 326 television sets per 1,000 population. Televizioni Tojikiston is the state-run public broadcaster.

In the post-Soviet era, newspaper circulation has decreased sharply because of the high expense of materials and the poverty of the population. As a result of government pressure and refusal of license renewals, no opposition newspapers were operating in the run-up to the 2006 presidential election. Among the most-read newspapers are Jumhuriyat (Republic, in Tajik, thrice weekly), Khalk ovozi (Voice of the People, in Uzbek, thrice weekly), Kurer Tadzhikistana (Tajikistan Courier, in Russian, weekly), Sadoi mardum (Voice of the People, in Tajik, thrice weekly), and Tojikiston (Tajikistan, in Tajik, thrice weekly). In 2006, four domestic news agencies and one Russian agency (RIA Novosti) were operating.

== See also ==
- Communications in Tajikistan
- List of newspapers in Tajikistan
- Cinema of Tajikistan
- List of journalists killed in Tajikistan
- Internet in Tajikistan
