= Khudoyor Yusufbekov =

Soviet scientist (1928–1990)

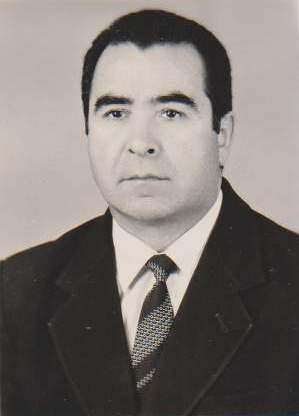
- Born: December 10, 1928; Pish, GBAO, Tajik ASSR, USSR
- Died: November 27, 1990 (aged 61); Dushanbe, Tajik SSR, Soviet Union
- Education: Tajik Agricultural Institute
- Scientific career
- Fields: Plant growing Pasture; Agriculture; Botany; Biology
- Workplaces: Pamir Botanical Garden; Institute of Botany; Pamir Biological Station; Pamir Biological Institute of the Academy of Sciences of Tajik SSR; Tajik Agricultural Institute of Ministry of Agriculture of the USSR; Academy of Sciences of Tajik SSR

Signature
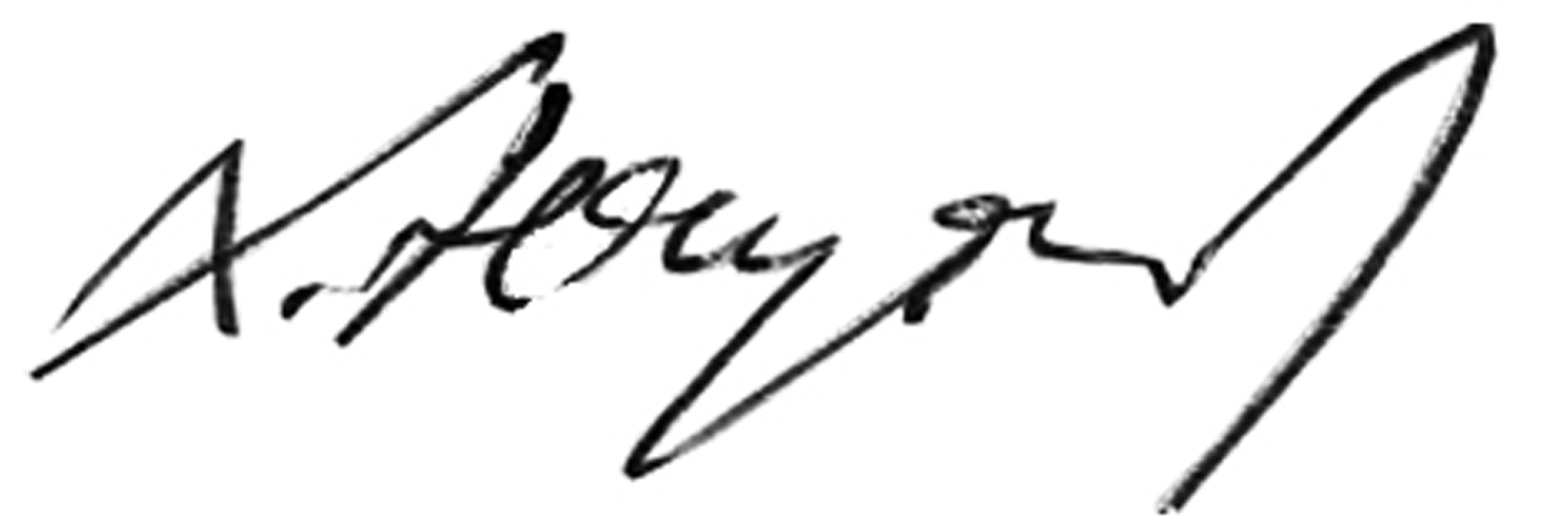

Khudoyor Yusufbekovich Yusufbekov (Russian: Худоер Юсуфбекович Юсуфбеков, Tajik: Худоёр Юсуфбеков; December 10, 1928 — November 27, 1990) was a Soviet scientist and organizer of scientific projects and institutes in Pamir. He was a leading scientist who made a significant contribution to the development of biological sciences, whose name is connected with a new direction of the development of plant growing in the arid mountain and highland territory of Pamir-Alay; a prominent specialist in the field of plant growing, plant introduction and pasture economy, meadow studies, phyto-amelioration, and botany, Yusufbekov was a practicing field researcher, figure of higher education, and professor. In 1968, he developed a system for fodder improvement in the Pamir and Alay valleys that was differentiated from the perspective of the ecological and geographical areas and high-altitude zones. He also implemented a system of arid fodder, and proposed methods of cultivation of useful plants in the Pamir area in 1972. In 1970—1975, Khudoyor Yusufbekov developed the master plan of reconstruction of the Pamir Botanical Garden. In 1969, he became doctor of the agricultural sciences. In 1976, he became an Academician of the Academy of Sciences of the Tajik Soviet Socialist Republic. In 1962—1969, he was the director of the Pamir Biological Station; at the same time in 1965—1990, he was the Chairman of the Bureau of the Pamir Base; in 1969—1981, the director of the Pamir Biological Institute of the Academy of Sciences of the Tajik SSR; in 1981—1986, the rector of the Tajik Agricultural Institute of the Ministry of Agriculture of the USSR; in 1986—1990, the Academician Secretary of the Biological Department of the Academy of Sciences of the Tajik SSR. From 1989, he was a Member of the Presidium of Academy of Sciences of the Tajik SSR. Moreover, he was a state and public figure, the head of the scientific council of the department of biological science of the Academy of Sciences of the Tajik SSR and a Member of the coordination council of the department of general biology of the Academy of Sciences of the USSR (1987—1990). He was also a fellow of the Geographical Society of the USSR since 1965, Member of the All-Union and Central Asian Councils of the Botanical Gardens of the USSR (1972—1990), Member of the Council on the "Biological Foundations of the Rational Use and Protection of Flora" of the Academy of Sciences of the USSR (1976—1990), Member of the Council on the "Biological Foundations of the Development of Mountain Territories in Central Asia" (1975—1990), Member of the Council of the All-Union Botanical Society (1976—1990).

== Biography ==
=== Early life and scientific activity ===
Khudoyor Yusufbekovich Yusufbekov was born on December 10, 1928, in Pish, a village in Darmorakht subdistrict of the Gorno-Badakhshan Autonomous Region (GBAO) in the Tajik ASSR, USSR in the family of a kolkhoz member-gardener. He was 10 years old when his mother died. After finishing the seventh grade school in his village, he worked as a kolkhoz farmer and as a laborer in the construction of a road (1945—1946). In 1949, he graduated the Kirov secondary school in Khorog, and in 1949—1954, he studied in Tajik Agricultural Institute. (Note: During his studies, he showed interest towards scientific activities and actively participated in the work of the scientific circle at the agronomic faculty.) Starting from 1954, he began his scientific activities in the Pamir Botanical Garden, where he worked under the supervision of Anatoly Gursky and did research on consolidation and developing of sand and pebble massifs in Ishkashim District, as well as work over developing the collections and production nurseries in the Pamir Botanical Garden. In 1956, Khudoyor Yusufbekov performed his first experiments on the meadow formation of the desert pastures on the West Pamir.

=== Institute of Botany of the Academy of Sciences of Tajik SSR ===
In 1957 he began his full-time post-graduate study at the Institute of Botany of the Academy of Sciences of Tajik SSR in the city of Dushanbe under the supervision of professor Ivan Tsatsenkin (Moscow, the Williams All-Union Institute of Fodder) and pursued further his research on meadow formation of the mountainous deserted lands (slopes) in the Western Pamirs. After his graduation from the institute, he continued to work therein as a junior scientific worker. While working on further investigations of the Pamirs, he started the first experiments of improving the pastures in the central parts of Tajikistan (Kondara and Rangontay). During these years, Khudoyor Yusufbekov formulated and experimentally proved methods of creating highly productive forage lands by means of different types of irrigation systems for sowing grasses without disturbance of natural vegetation. The results of such investigations and tests introduced into the kolkhoz farm production of the Shughnan and Ishkashim districts of the GBAO in large areas were the basis of the master's thesis defended by him in 1961.

=== Pamir Biological Station of the Academy of Sciences of Tajik SSR in Chechekty near Murghab ===
In 1962—1969, he was the director of the Pamir Biological Station of the Academy of Sciences of Tajik SSR, in the location of Chechekty (3860 meters above sea level) near Murghab — East Pamir, (Note: In 1963, he was awarded the academic title of senior researcher in the field of land reclamation and irrigated agriculture. In 1966, he joined the ranks of members of the CPSU.) at the same time in 1965, he was elected the Chairman of the Bureau of the Pamir Base of the Academy of Sciences of Tajik SSR.

During the working period at the biostation, he launched experimental work on improvement of pastures and hayfields in all areas of the GBAO, as well as the Alay Valley of the Kirghiz SSR. Under his leadership at the Pamir Biostation in 1964, three laboratories were created:

- physiology and biochemistry of plants;
- introduction of plants;
- experimental geobotany.

The scientific research activity of the biostation (the beginning of manifestation of the scientific and organizational abilities of Khudoyor Yusufbekov) acquired a complex character. Here, along with the problems of ecological physiology and biochemistry of plants initiated by Professor Oleg Zalensky, further studies were carried out on experimental geobotanics, phyto-amelioration, soil studies, microorganisms, climatology, and the issues of crop cultivation in the Eastern Pamirs.

During the years of his work, the number of employees and the volume of scientific research significantly increased, which had a positive effect on the activities of the biostation. The traditions of the biostation laid by Pavel Baranov, Ilariya Raikova, (Note: The pre-revolutionary period of research on the nature of the Pamirs is associated with the names of zoologists Alexei Pavlovich Fedchenko and Nikolai Severtzov, geologists Ivan Mushketov and Dmitriy Ivanov, botanists Olga Fedchenko, Arnold Regel, Sergey Korzhinskiy, Nikolai Vavilov and others. These were uncoordinated expeditions of single enthusiasts, while in Soviet times, they were replaced by systematic research. To study the biological resources of the Pamir and its development in 1934, under the leadership of Pavel Baranov and Ilariya Raykova, the first scientific research stations were established. — Khudoyor Yusufbekov, "Памирский биологический институт" [Pamir Biological Institute]. Природа: [Nature] (in Russian). 12. Moscow: Nauka: 48. 1982..) Oleg Zalensky and Kirill Stanyukovich found a decent continuation in the activities of Khudoyor Yusufbekov.

During his work at the Pamir Biostation, Khudoyor Yusufbekov strengthened the material and technical base of the biological station with trucks, laboratory equipment, and chemical reagents in order to improve the conditions of the Pamir expeditionary survey and continued to improve methods for improving the desert and steppe pastures of the Pamir-Alay, by studying the structure of vegetation, and the topographical and ecological conditions of high-mountain pastures in a wide geographical and high-altitude range.

As a result, he developed a system of improving the feeding grounds of the Pamirs and the Alay Valley, differentiated by eco-geographical regions and high-altitude belts, and presented the findings in the form of a monograph published in 1968.

In 1968, Khudoyor Yusufbekov was elected a Corresponding Member of the Academy of Sciences of the Tajik SSR.

In 1969, the monograph «Улучшение пастбищ и сенокосов Памира и Алайской долины» ("Improvement of pastures and hayfields of the Pamir and Alai Valley") was presented as a thesis (Moscow, the Williams All-Union Feed Institute), which Khudoyor Yusufbekov successfully defended to receive the degree of Doctor of Agricultural Sciences.

=== Pamir Biological Institute ===
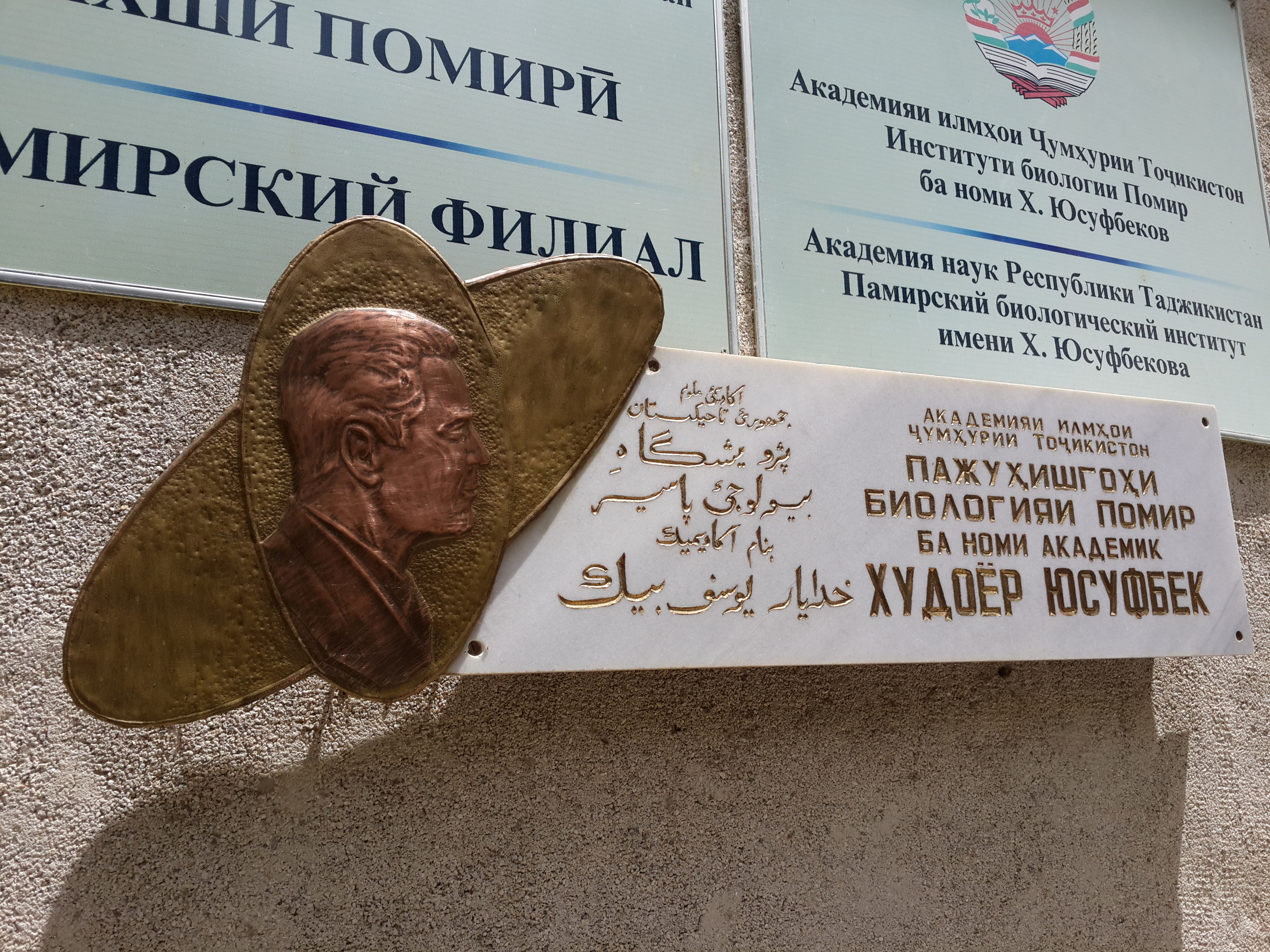
The plaque with a relief image of Khudoyor Yusufbekov on the façade of Pamir Biological Institute

In October 1968, the President of the Academy of Sciences of the USSR Mstislav Keldysh arrived in the Pamirs and visited the Pamir Botanical Garden. He was accompanied by the Chairman of the Council of Ministers of the Tajik SSR Abdulakhad Kakharov, the President of the academy of the Tajik SSR, Muhammad Osimi, and the First Secretary of the Gorno-Badakhshan Oblast Committee of the Communist Party of Tajikistan, Moyonsho Nazarchoev. Khudoyor Yusufbekov reported in details history of Pamir study to the high-ranking guests, about its natural resources, about the problems that needed to be solved in the field of biology, agriculture and, at the end, having justified the question of the necessity of creating a biological institute in the Pamirs, he asked the support of Mstislav Keldysh in consideration and resolution of this issue in Moscow. With the expansion and deepening of research at the Pamir Biological station, as well as growth of the number of scientific staff and taking into account the unique conditions in Pamir and in order to coordinate all studies related to the arid mountain areas, he stressed out the importance of this.

Soon, the president of the Academy of Sciences of the Tajik SSR, Muhammad Osimi, and Khudoyor Yusufbekov were invited to Moscow to participate in the discussion of the establishment of a biological institute. At a joint meeting of the Presidium of the USSR Academy of Sciences and the USSR State Committee on Science and Technology, the issue was resolved positively. In 1969, all the biological agencies of Pamir such as the Pamir Biological Station in the Eastern Pamir (3860 m above sea level), Pamir Botanical Garden near the town of Khorugh (2320 m above sea level), and the outpost in Ishkashim (2600 m above sea level) were combined by Khudoyor Yusufbekov into the Pamir Biological Institute, the first director of which he became after its foundation (1969—1981). Currently, the institute is named after him (1992).

Khudoyor Yusufbekov's scientific and organizational abilities were revealed at the post of director of the institute. Along with scientific work, he also led a great deal of organizational activity. He determined the structure of the units of the Institute. Along with the traditional lines of research, he started scientific works on zoology, genetics plant breeding, and nature protection.

In 1970—1975, Khudoyor Yusufbekov developed a scheme for the master plan for development of the Anatoly Gursky Pamir Botanical Garden. To develop the scientific base, expand the areas of the botanical garden and preserve typical biological objects, more than 600 hectares of land in the vicinity of the botanical garden were obtained. In addition, 19 hectares of irrigated lands were connected to the territory of the garden, on the basis of which experimental sections of the Institute's units were organized. During the years of Khudoyor Yusufbekov's direct leadership (since 1965 till September 1990) of the fruit growing laboratory, situated at the altitude of 2700–3500 m, the area dedicated to the collection of global flora increased by 7 times, and the collection itself increased by 10 times, up to 4000 species and subspecies. The collections of plants in the garden are arranged according to geographical principles, and the irrigated territory is divided into 5 floristic departments: Central Asia and East Asia, Europe and the Caucasus, North America, the Himalayas, and the Hindu Kush. Inside the departments, the plants are arranged in generic complexes, taking into account ecological features of the species. In accordance with specifics of the objects of research in the garden, three groups were formed: dendrology, fodder and medicinal plants, and floriculture. The main task of the Pamir Botanical Garden was the introduction of plants. It exchanged seeds of highland flora and planting material with 112 gardens inside the USSR and 118 gardens from 39 major botanical centers of Europe (East Germany, West Germany, Norway, Denmark, the Netherlands, Czechoslovakia), North America (Canada and the United States), and other countries of the world. In 1972, a pumping station was built, thanks to which the waters of the river Shahdara raised to a height of 180 m. This enabled expanding the irrigated territory from 22 to 118 hectares at an altitude of 2140–2360 m, by over 5 times. The area of 4 floristic departments increased by 2 — 4 times. A laboratory, residential buildings, and the road and irrigation systems inside the garden of the Institute were built.

In Darvaz, a support center for introduction and acclimatization of subtropical and citrus plants in an 8 hectare area. Initiated in 1975 under his leadership, the experiments on introduction of citrus and other subtropical cultures in Darvaz proved the prospects for development of citrus cultivation in the Kalayikhumb district of the GBAO. At the Julius Fučík Sovkhoz (state farm), a lemon orchard was planted on a 1 hectare area, as well as pomegranate and fig gardens on 8 hectares. To the same extent, studies of shape diversity and distribution of sea buckthorn were successfully launched in 1976. Several forms of low-thorned sea buckthorn with high oil content were identified. Expediency of cultivating sea buckthorn on pebbles in floodplains of Pamir rivers was proved.

Khudoyor Yusufbekov's scientific interests covered a wide range of issues related to study of the nature of the Pamirs. Along with solving the problem of improving pastures, he collected significant material on protection, restoration and purposeful reconstruction of the vegetation of the Gorno-Badakhshan Autonomous Region. In the monograph "Растительность Западного Памира и опыт её реконструкции" ("The Vegetation of the Western Pamirs and the Experience of Its Reconstruction"), written jointly by Okmir Agakhanyants, the Pamirs' territorial resources were analyzed, and he introduced the concept of a testing ground for land development (полигон мелиорации) of the Western Pamir. In that ground, he singled out 12 classes of land and provided valid recommendations for economic development of each of them. In the monograph, the model of the development of the Pamir, developed by Khudoyor Yusufbekov, is presented in the most complete form. Its constituent elements were the issues of complex vegetation reconstruction on sandy slopes and pebbles, furrowless watering on steep rocky slopes, reconstruction of vegetation of ancient terraces, mudflow cones of erosion, etc. Mountain slopes that had been eroded were supposed to be used in particular for orchards and meadowing between the plants by sowing perennial legumes. The scheme for reconstructing the vegetation of eroded slopes was not only developed, but also successfully tested in Shugnan, Rushan and Ishkashim districts of the GBAO.

Recommendations for the integrated reconstruction of vegetation on sands and gravels also found wide application in production. From just 1965 to 1980, the Gorno-Badakhshan forest organizarton created poplar and apricot plantations on an area of 1500 hectares. In the following years, planting works on blown sands and rocky terrain were conducted annually across an area of 300–350 hectares.

The main ideas and methods related to the plant development of the Pamirs were described by Khudoyor Yusufbekov in addition to the previously published works in the monographs "Методы возделывания полезных растений на Памире" ("Methods of cultivating useful plants in the Pamirs", 1972), "Терескен на Памире" ("Teresken in the Pamirs", 1972), "Pamir" (1973) and in numerous brochures, collections and articles. At present more than 300 scientific works have been published.

A lot of work was done to prepare and grow the scientific staff of the Institute, taking into account the specific difficulties and the remoteness of the Pamirs from major scientific centers. By the end of 1975, the Pamir Biological Institute staff numbered over 100 people, of which 45 were researchers. Scientists from other regions of the Soviet Union were invited to work at the Institute, and concrete measures were taken to train personnel on the ground through postgraduate study and competition. During the period of the leadership of Khudoyor Yusufbekov, two doctoral and more than 30 candidate dissertations were defended by just the staff of the biostation and the institute alone. At the same time, communication with many research institutes of the USSR Academy of Sciences was established: Timiryazev Institute of Plant Physiology, Kurchatov Institute of Atomic Energy (IAE), the Institute of Botany, the Pavlovsky Institute of Zoology and Parasitology of the Academy of Sciences of the Tajik SSR, and other scientific research institutes of the Academy of Sciences of the USSR.

Khudoyor Yusufbekov's love for the nature of the Pamirs and his concern for the preservation of the natural environment and scientific history of the Pamirs also manifested in the fact that under his leadership the Museum "The Nature of the Pamir" was organized. Later, even when he was the rector of the Tajik Agricultural Institute, he continued to take an interest in the work and development of the museum, which is now very popular among visitors, including foreigners. Khudoyor Yusufbekov, wherever he worked, created museums in which it was possible to get acquainted with the history and achievements of science in a visual form. He believed that all this served the birth of innovative research and the continuation of scientific development in the future.

=== Tajik Agricultural Institute ===
In May 1981, Khudoyor Yusufbekov was transferred to work in Dushanbe at the post of rector of the Tajik Agricultural Institute of the Main Administration of Agricultural Higher Educational Institutions of the Ministry of Agriculture of the USSR (1981—1986). Here he paid much attention to development of research work at the departments and attraction of the students to the scientific research activities in the scientific and student councils. He systematically organized conferences, meetings, and symposiums on many aspects of agricultural science. The educational base of the Institute was strengthened so the students would master practical skills in solving specific production issues; for that, new educational facilities based on the sovkhoz "Yavan-2" of the Yavan district were organized. Khudoyor Yusufbekov made significant efforts to complete the construction of a new building of the zoological engineering faculty, which was completed in 1987. Khudoyor Yusufbekov organized new departments for the preparation of highly qualified specialists of fruit and wine growing, a laboratory for collective use of scientific devices at the agronomic faculty, a laboratory of computing machinery at the faculty of economics, and three new chairs at the institute. Under him, entrance examinations using computers were held for the first time, he also created a museum dedicated to the history of the Institute. As a specialist in the introduction of new species, Khudoyor Yusufbekov made an optimal decision to reconstruct and place green spaces on the territory adjacent to the institute. He conducted teaching activities at the department of agriculture, lectured at the course "Meadow Fodder Production" for students. He was the Chairman of the specialized scientific councils for protection of Ph.D. theses on specialties "Plant Growing" and "Selection and Seed Farming". While he had this job, Khudoyor Yusufbekov still continued to conduct scientific management of the subjects of research of the Pamir Botanical Garden and the laboratory of high-altitude fruit growing, as well as supervising the work of the graduate students.

=== The Academy of Sciences of the Tajik SSR ===
Khudoyor Yusufbekov was the Academician Secretary of the Biological Department of the Academy of Sciences of Tajik SSR (1986—1990). He had a wide range of scientific interests in the field of biology. The Biological department of the Academy of Sciences of the Tajik SSR was one of its subunits. It consisted of scientific instituts devoted to biology-related issues like: botany, zoology and parasitology (the institute was named after academician Yevgeny Pavlovsky), physiology and biophysics of plants, gastroenterology, general genetics and safety, and rational utilization of natural resources. The Pamir Biological Institute, later named after Khudoyor Yusufbekov himself, was also included here. In 1989, he became the Member of the Presidium of the Academy of Sciences of the Tajik SSR. On his initiative, being at the same time the chairman of the Pamir scientific research base and a Member of the Presidium of the Academy of Sciences of the Tajik SSR, the Department of Pamir Studies from the Rudaki Institute of Language and Literature was relocated to Khorog from Dushanbe; the Department of Social and Economic Research of the Pamir Research Base in the Pamirs was established, later on the basis of these two departments after his death (11/27/1990), in 1991 the Institute of Humanities in the Pamirs was established (Note: In Khorog, academician Kh. Yu. Yusufbekov, during his lifetime, organized the provision of apartments for all researchers from the city of Dushanbe. His plans included, in addition to the creation of the Institute of Humanities, to create an Institute of Glaciology and an Institute of Mathematics in the Pamirs. His organizational skills, authority, close scientific relations with many scientific research institutes of the USSR, the potential of scientists of the local Pamiris and others in the republic — in the Soviet Union, for that period of history would allow him to put all this into practice.)

== Death ==
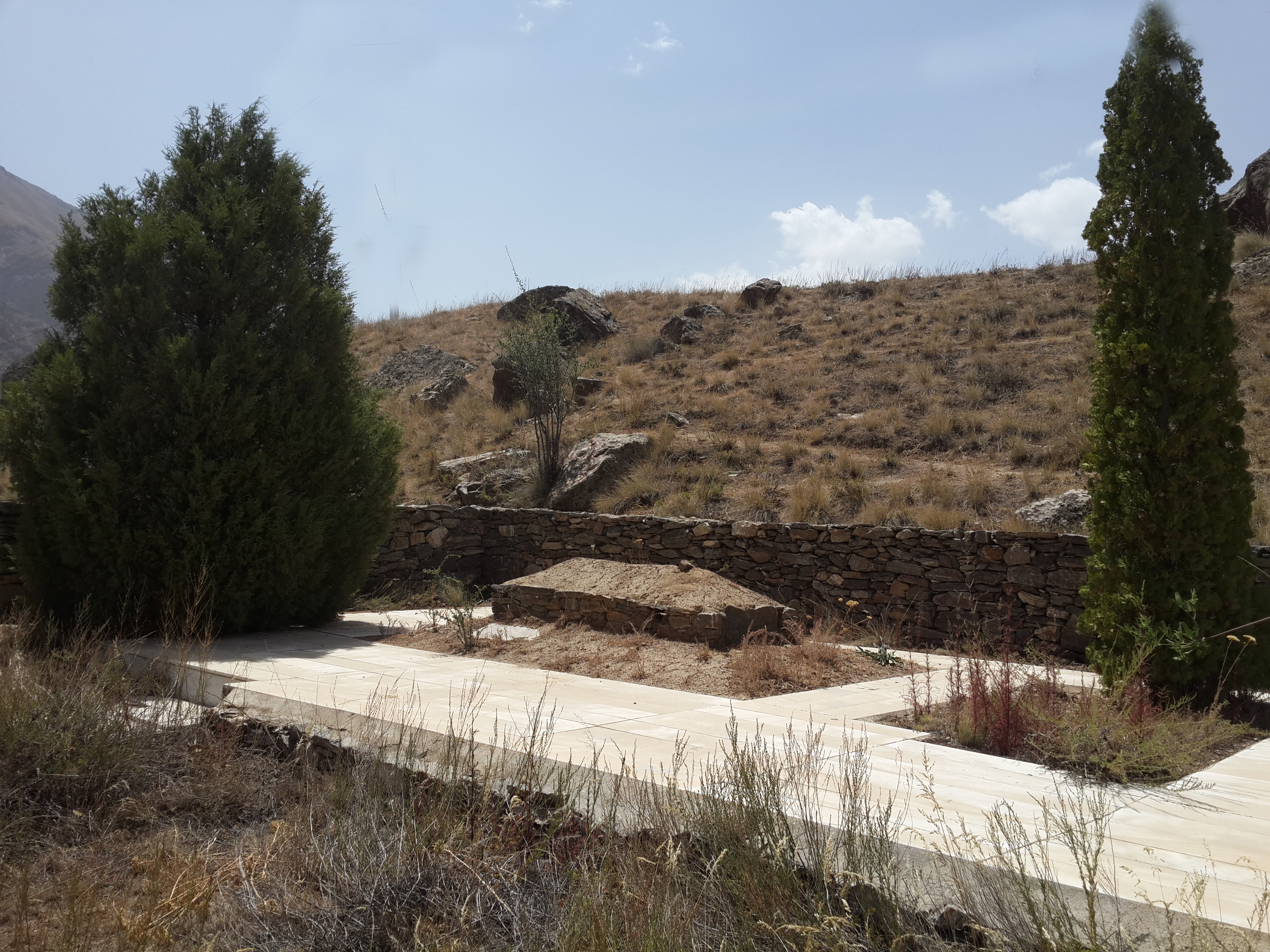
Khudoyor Yusufbekov's grave

In 1990, Khudoyor Yusufbekovich Yusufbekov fell sick, dying at the Dushanbe hospital No. 4 on November 27 of that year. On the request of the leadership of the Tajik SSR and the Academy of Science of the Tajik SSR, his body had been transported by plane to the town of Khorog where he was buried in the Pamir Botanical Garden, on the top of the highest hill.

== Awards and honors ==
- Honorary Diploma of the Presidium of the Supreme Soviet of the Tajik SSR (No. 32346, 1964),
- Medal "For Labour Valour" (No. 149044, 1966),
- Jubilee Medal "In Commemoration of the 100th Anniversary of the Birth of Vladimir Ilyich Lenin" (No. 1041386, 1970),
- Medal Exhibition of Achievements of the National Economy of the USSR (1970),
- Bronze medal of the Exhibition of Economic Achievements "For Achievements in the Development of the National Economy of the USSR" (No. 38626, 1972),
- Sergey Vavilov Medal (1974),
- The Diploma of the Presidium of the Academy of Sciences of the Tajik SSR (1976),
- Order of the Red Banner of Labour (No. 1042386, 1981),
- The title of "Honored Worker of Science of the Tajik SSR" for his services in the development of agricultural science, the study of the nature of the Pamirs (23.11.1978),
- Thanksgiving letter of the Order of Lenin of the All-Union Society "Knowledge" of the USSR (Moscow, December 28, 1984, No. 65281),
- Honorary Diploma of the Youth League of Tajikistan for fruitful work on the communist education of the younger generation (1985),
- Awarded the State Abu Ali ibn Sina Prize of the Tajik SSR and the title of laureate of the Abu Ali ibn Sina Award for the series of works "Improvement of Pastures and Hayfields of the Pamirs and Alay Valley and Plant Cultivation of the Pamir Mountain Territories" (1989).

== Member of scientific councils, societies, commissions, editorial boards of scientific journals and participation in international congresses, conferences, seminars and meetings ==
He participated in the work of all-Union, republican scientific councils and editorial boards of scientific journals:

- Member of the Coordination Council of the General Biology Department of the Academy of Sciences of the USSR (1987—1990).
- Member of the All-Union and Central Asian Councils of the Botanical Gardens of the USSR (1972—1990).
- Member of the Council on the "Biological Foundations of the Rational Use and Protection of Flora" of the Academy of Sciences of the USSR (1976—1990).
- Member of the Council on the "Biological Foundations of the Development of Mountain Territories in Central Asia" (1975—1990).
- Member of the Council of the All-Union Botanical Society (1976—1990).
- Chairman of the Council for the Coordination of Scientific Activities of the Department of Biological Sciences of the Academy of Sciences of the Tajik SSR (1987–1990).
- Fellow of the Geographical Society of the USSR (1965—1990).
- Participated in the XII International Congress on Meadow Cultivation in Moscow (1974).
- Participated in the XIX International Congress on Gardening in Warsaw, representing the Soviet science abroad (1974).
- Member of the Organizing Committee of the 4th All-Union Conference on the Study and Development of Flora and Highland Vegetation (Dushanbe, June 1968 (Note: The meeting was held in Dushanbe, Central Asia, at the Institute of Botany of the Academy of Sciences of the Tajik SSR from the 20th to the 25th June, 1968, and over 150 specialists took part in the meeting representing scientific botanical organizations from 9 Soviet Republics.)).
- Together with the staff of the State Committee for Science and Technology of the Council of Ministers of the USSR, he organized in Dushanbe an international seminar on the development of integrated programs for training and on conducting research on sustainable land use in the Himalayan region (1987).
- Member of the Audit Commission of the All-Union "Knowledge" Society of the USSR (1976—1986).
- Member of the Presidium of the All-Union "Knowledge" Society of the Tajik SSR (1976—1986).
- Member of the Presidium of the Society "Nature Conservation" of the Tajik SSR (1976—1990).
- Member of the main editorial board of the "Tajik Soviet Encyclopedia" (1968—1990).
- Member of the editorial board of the special volumes for the 50th and 60th anniversaries of the Tajik SSR and the Communist Party of Tajikistan (1974—1984).
- Member of the scientific editorial board of the "Agricultural Encyclopedia of Tajikistan" (1988—1990).
- Member of the editorial board of the journal "News of the Academy of Sciences of the Tajik SSR, Biological Sciences Department" (1966—1986).
- Chief editor of the journal "News of the Academy of Sciences of the Tajik SSR, Biological Sciences Department" (1986—1990).
- Member of the Audit Commission of Gorno-Badakhshan Oblast of the Society "Knowledge" (1966—1981).
- Chairman of the Gorno-Badakhshan Oblast Society "Nature Conservation" (1966—1981).
- He took an active part in promoting the achievements of science among the population of the republic. For many years of his active work as the Chairman of the Board of the Gorno-Badakhshan Regional Society "Knowledge" and the introduction of scientific achievements into production, he was awarded the medal of the academician Sergey Vavilov (1974).
- Headed the delegation of the republic during the visit to Dushanbe's sister town of Klagenfurt in Austria (1983).

== Selected works and certain publications ==
- Yusufbekov, Kh. Y. (1968). Улучшение пастбищ и сенокосов Памира и Алайской долины [The Improvement of Pasture and Haymaking in Pamir and Alay Valleys] (in Russian). Dushanbe: Donish. p. 320. National Library of Russia. The original owner is Cornell University, digitized on April 15, 2009
- Yusufbekov, Kh. Y. (1972). Методы возделывания полезных растений в условиях Памира [The Methods of Useful Plants and Herbs Cultivations in Pamir] (in Russian). Dushanbe: Donish. p. 159. Russian State Library
- Yusufbekov, Kh. Y.; Kasach, A. E. (1972). Терескен на Памире [Ceratoides Pamirs] (in Russian). Dushanbe: Donish. p. 132. Food and Agriculture Organization of the United Nations. (Kh. I︠U︡. I︠U︡sufbekov, A.E. Kasach Teresken na Pamire United States Department of Agriculture National Agricultural Library). Natural conditions of the Pamirs. Teresken spreading areas. Biological features of teresken. Ecological assessment of the Teresken communities in the Pamirs. Age composition of teresken populations. Biological Productivity. Feed characteristic of teresken and teresken pastures. The influence of grazing and human activities on the vegetation of the teresken pastures. Practical measures to improve, use and protect the teresken pastures of the Pamirs.
- Yusufbekov, Kh. Y. (1973). Памир. Основные итоги исследований природы Памира за 100 лет и дальнейшие перспективы их развития [Pamir. The main results of research of the Pamir nature over 100 years and further prospects for their development] (in Russian). Dushanbe: Donish. p. 166. "The original owner is University of California, digitized on July 27, 2007"
- Yusufbekov, Kh. Y. (1974). Кормовые ресурсы Джаушангоза, их использование и улучшение [The Fodder Resources Jaushangoz, theirs Use and Improvement] (in Russian). Dushanbe: Donish. p. 37. The original owner is University of Chicago, digitized on July 19, 2011.
- Yusufbekov, Kh. Y. (1975). Проблемы биологии и сельского хозяйства Памира [Problems of Biology and Agriculture of the Pamirs] (in Russian). Dushanbe: Donish. p. 364. The original owner is University of California, digitized on July 27, 2007.
- Yusufbekov, Kh. Y.; Agakhanyants, O. E. (1975). Растительность Западного Памира и опыт её реконструкции [The Vegetation of the Western Pamirs and the Experience of Its Reconstruction] (in Russian). Dushanbe: Donish. p. 310.. Title in Latin: Rastitelʹnostʹ Zapadnogo Pamira i opyt ee rekonstruktsii. The original owner is University of California, digitized on February 15, 2007.
- Yusufbekov, Kh. (1982). "Памирский биологический институт" [Pamir Biological Institute]. Природа: [Nature] (in Russian). 12. Moscow: USSR Publisher of Academy of Sciences "Наука": 48–53.
- Yusufbekov, Kh. (1984). "Памирский ботанический сад и основные этапы его развития" [Pamir Botanical Garden and the main stages of its development] (in Russian) ("Интродукция растений и ботанические исследования в Горном Бадахшане" [Plant Introduction and Botanical Research in the Gorno-Badakhshan] ed.). Dushanbe: Donish. pp. 3–20.
- Yusufbekov, Kh. (1980). "Памирский биологический институт" [Pamir Biological Institute] (in Russian). Vol. 2 (Tajik Soviet Encyclopedia ed.). Dushanbe: Moscow printing house of the II Union polygraph industry under the State Committee for Publishing in the Soviet Union. pp. 592–593.
- Yusufbekov, Kh. Y. Some publications. United States Department of Agriculture National Agricultural Library. United States National Agricultural Library

== Literature ==
- Olimova, M. D.; Shaposhnikova, N. N., eds. (1989). Худоер Юсуфбекович Юсуфбеков: [Ученый в обл. растениеводства] [Khudoyor Yusufbekovich Yusufbekov: [Scientist in the field of plant growing] (in Russian) (A. A. Konnov ed.). Dushanbe: Donish. p. 52. (Khudoer I︠U︡sufbekovich I︠U︡sufbekov: Boston College Thomas P. O'Neill Library, New York Botanical Garden The LuEsther T. Mertz Library, The British Library)
- Mansurov, Kh. Kh.; Maksumov, A. N. (1992). "Памяти ученого" [In memory of the scientist]. ”Известия” Biological Department of the Academy of Sciences of the Republic of Tajikistan (in Russian). 2 (126): 63–64.
- Zurobek, N.; Haknazar, O. (29 December 1990). "Мазори гулафшони олим" [Grave showered with flowers]. Tojikiston Soveti (Soviet Tajikistan) (in Tajik). Vol. 298, no. 18289. p. 3.
- Kreutzmann, Hermann; Watanabe, Teiji (2016). Mapping Transition in the Pamirs: Changing Human-Environmental Landscapes. Advances in Asian Human-Environmental Research. Springer Cham Heidelberg New York Dordrecht London (Springer International Publishing Switzerland). pp. 50–51. doi:10.1007/978-3-319-23198-3. ISBN 978-3-319-23197-6. ISSN 1879-7180. LCCN 2015959348. S2CID 133342329. "Only three authors were identified that have more than ten coauthors. These are Kirill V. Stanyukovich (Academy of Sciences of the Tajik SSR) and Khudoer Y. Yusufbekov (the first director of the Pamir Biological Institute in Khorog) in the Soviet period as well as Cyrus Samimi (Professor for Climatology at the University of Bayreuth, Germany) in the post-Soviet period. <…> For Soviet author, 30 coauthors networks could be detected, with the most densely linked group around Stanyukovich and Yusufbekov"
- Babiy, T. P.; Kokhanova, L. L.; Kostyuk, G. G. (1984). Биологи: биографический справочник [Biologists: biographical reference book] (in Russian). Kiev: Naukova Dumka. p. 734. "Annotation: A unique biographical reference book on Russian biologists and the world. Brief information about the life and scientific activity of over 1600 scientists is placed, which made a significant contribution to the development of biological sciences. Lists of Nobel Prize laureates are listed, as well as a list of literature containing works on the history of biology and the most important works of scientists. The handbook is illustrated with portraits of scientists, ... (Khudoyor Yusufbekov p. 734)"
- Agakhani︠a︡nt︠s, Okmir Egishevich (1972). За растениями по горам Средней Азии [In search of plants on the Mountains of Central Asia] (in Russian). Moscow: Мысль. p. 158. "Среднеазиатским ботаникам, почвоведам, геологам, археологам (о Худоере Юсуфбекове см. с. 32-36) посвящается ("Dedicated for the scientists-botanists, pedologists, geologists, archaeologists Central Asian") [about Khudoyor Yusufbekov see pp. 32–36]"
- Pokrovsky, Anatoly (November 1974). "Enigmas of the plant world of Central Asia; Soviet scientists study the paradoxical botanical wealth of the Pamirs". UNESCO Courier. Paris: UNESCO Courier: a window open on the world, XXVII, 11, p. 26-31, illus. "Scientists are anxious to get to the bottom of this puzzle, and this is why a few years ago the Biological Institute of the Pamirs was founded. Its director is Khudoyor Yusufbekov, <…> a leading scientist and a Corresponding Member of the Tajik Academy of Sciences"
- Dodikhudoev, Khayol (July 1997). "Жизнь, отданная науке" [Life given to science]. Newspaper ”Бадахшон” Edition of the Majlis of people's deputies of the Gorno-Badakhshan Autonomous Region of the Republic of Tajikistan (in Russian). Vol. Special edition in honor of the 40th anniversary of the inheritance of the title of Imam of Time Aga Khan IV. Khorog. p. 19.:

”Khudoyor was a scientist whose fate and all his life were closely connected with the Pamirs. Relocating the "Department of Pamir Studies" from the Institute of Language and Literature Rudaki to the Pamirs where we worked was precisely his undertaking ...” = «Худоёр был учёный, судьба и вся жизнь которого были тесно связаны с Памиром. Перебазировать «Отдел Памироведения» из Института языка и литературы им. А. Рудаки, где мы работали, на Памир было именно его начинанием…»

— Doctor of Philology, D. Karamshoev

- Karamshoev, Dodkhudo (25 October 1998). "Речь по случаю 70 летия со дня рождения академика X. Ю. Юсуфбекова к. Пиш, Шугнанский р/н ГБАО" [Speech on the occasion of the 70th birthday of academician Khudoyor Yusufbekov, Pish, Shughnon District of the GBAO] (in Tajik). Pish. "We consider Khudoer to be the founder not only of the Pamir Biological Institute, but also the founder, the ancestor of the Institute of Humanities in the Pamirs" ("Karamshoev, Dodkhudo — Speech on the occasion of the 70th birthday of Academician Khudoyor Yusufbekov, Pish, Shughnon District of the GBAO". Biography. 25 October 1998. Darmorakht.)
- Bashiri, Iraj (2002). Prominent Tajik Figures of the Twentieth Century. Dushanbe: Self-published. pp. 349–350. "BiographiesTajik agriculturalist Khudoyor Yusufbekovich Yusufbekov was born in the village of Pish of Shughnan, Badakhshan, on December 10, 1928 ...joined the CPSU in 1966.<…> graduated from the Faculty of Agronomy … in 1954. <…> 1954 to 1957 was a Senior Scientific Worker in the Botanical Gardens in Pamir for the Academy of Sciences <…> doctorate degree in agriculture in 1969 <…> … Corresponding Member since 1968, became an Academician of the Academy of Sciences in 1976 <…> became a Distinguished Contributor to Science …" Iraj Bashiri is Professor of History at the University of Minnesota, one of the leading scholars in the fields of Central Asian Studies and Iranian Studies.
