= Meirkhaim Gavrielov =

Tajik journalist and Jewish community leader

Meirkhaim Gavrielov (25 August 1927 – 9 June 1998) was a Bukharian Jewish journalist murdered in Tajikistan.

== Life ==
Meirkhaim Gavrielov was a prominent member of the Tajikistani media for fifty years. Gavrielov was born in 1927 in Samarkand, Uzbekistan. He studied philology at Samarkand State Pedagogical Institute. Gavrielov relocated to Tajikistan and in 1947 he began work as a writer and editor at the staff of the newspaper Tojikistoni Soveti (Тоджикистони Совети). From 1966 through 1974 he taught journalism in the Tajik Philology department of Tajik State University. From 1979 to his death Gavrielov held the position of editor-in-chief of the Tajik Agrarian University newspaper "Donish" (Дониш). Gavrielov excelled in his field and became a member of the Union of the Journalists of Tajikistan and Union of the Writers of Uzbekistan. He was published under the pseudonym Meir Khalabi (Мэир Халаби), and in the years before his death he wrote several books.

In addition to his work as a journalist and author, Gavrielov was a leader of the Bukharian Jewish community in Dushanbe. He served as chairman of the Jewish Cultural Society, Khoverim (Ховерим), and was a member of the Jewish Section of the Writers Union of Tajikistan.

At the time of his death Gavrielov was seventy years old and had survived the brutal 1992-1997 civil war in Tajikistan that ravaged the country. But Gavrielov’s profession was a dangerous one, as more than 60 journalists were killed in Tajikistan in the 1990s, and prominent individuals throughout the country were routinely assassinated.

== Murder ==
At approximately 11:00 p.m. on 8 June 1998, unidentified persons entered the home of Gavrielov in Dushanbe, beat him, and then strangled him to death with a metal wire. The killing was a shocking incident, but not uncommon in Tajikistan. Initially the Ministry of Internal Affairs reported Gavrielov’s death as a suicide and claimed that Gavrielov had suffocated himself with a pillow. Later the facts surrounding Gavrielov’s death emerged after international scrutiny of the killing. It is uncertain whether or not Gavrielov's Judaism had any connection to this death.

== International reaction ==
Gavrielov’s murder aroused international condemnation and investigations from groups such as Human Rights Watch and Committee to Protect Journalists. Glasnost Defense Foundation wrote an appeal addressed to President Emomali Rahmonov to vigorously investigate Gavrielov killing and prosecute the murders. There was no reply.

The perpetrators of Gavrielov’s murder remain anonymous and unpunished.

== Works ==
Meirkhaim Gavielov wrote the following books:

- Солхо ва кисматхо (Solho va Kismatho), 1994.
- Андешахо, андешахо (Andeshaho, andeshaho), 1995.
- Маресеви точик (Maresevi Tojik), 1995.
- Гуломи илм (Ghulomi Ilm), 1995.

== See also ==
- List of journalists killed in Tajikistan
