= List of newspapers in Tajikistan =

This is a list of newspapers and news agencies in Tajikistan.

== Newspapers ==
- Asia Plus
- Avicenna – in Tajik and Russian (Dushanbe)
- DigestPress – in Russian (Dushanbe)
- Farazh – Tajik (Dushanbe)
- Futbol
- Golos Tajikistana – published weekly in Russian by the Communist Party
- Jumhuriyat – government-owned, published tri-weekly in Tajik (Dushanbe)
- Khalq Ovozi – government-owned, published tri-weekly in Uzbek
- The Khujand Plov (Khujand) – English-language, caters to foreigners, specializes in satirical content
- Minbar-i Khalq – published by the People's Democratic Party
- Najot – published weekly by the Islamic Rebirth Party
- Narkhi Gardun
- Narodnaya Gazeta – government-owned, published tri-weekly in Russian
- Neru-i Sukhan – privately owned, published weekly
- Nido-i Ranjbar – published weekly in Tajik by the Communist Party
- Oila
- Ozodagon
- Sadoi mardum – a thrice-weekly newspaper published in Tajikistan; one of the most widely circulated papers in the country; in Tajik
- Tojikiston – privately owned, published weekly in Tajik
- Varzish Sport
- Vecherka

== News agencies ==
- Asia-Plus – private, English-language agency
- Avesta – private, English-language
- Khovar – state-run
- Varorud – private

== See also ==
- List of newspapers
- List of journalists killed in Tajikistan
