= List of journalists killed in Tajikistan =

This is a list of journalists who have been killed in Tajikistan or journalists from Tajikistan killed outside of the country since 1990. Listees include those known to have been murdered, as well as cases of suspicious deaths.

== History ==
From 1990 to 2001 Tajikistan was one of the most dangerous countries in the world for journalists. Estimates for the number of journalists killed number from fifty to eighty. In the late 1980s and early 1990s, journalism in Tajikistan underwent a transformation as the Soviet Union liberalized under glasnost and perestroika. Journalists in both private and state-run media were permitted greater editorial and investigative freedoms to report on issues and to challenge government propaganda. But journalists ran into danger when they publicly confronted powerful interests or reported on violent events. The first journalistic death in Tajikistan occurred on 12 February 1990 when a sniper in a government building opened fire on demonstrators in Dushanbe, killing a number of individuals, including a Lenfilm employee filming the events from his hotel. Following the events of February 1990, the government placed pressure on editors to fire dozens of journalists working for local television stations, radio stations and newspapers.

Journalists continued to face official harassment through the fall of the Soviet Union and the independence of Tajikistan in 1991. In mid-1992 the Civil War in Tajikistan began, and journalists became targets for killings. During the war, forces of the opposition and the government both massacred civilians from certain regions because of their perceived political alignments. Thousands of Gharmis and Pamiris were selectively killed by pro-government forces for killings in the first year of the war. In December 1992 alone, four journalists of Pamiri origin were killed. There were also instances of journalists who were killed for their criticism of Islamic groups allied with the opposition. By 1995 at least 37 journalists had been killed in Tajikistan.

By the late 1990s, the number of killings of journalists in Tajikistan began to fall. This was not due to greater press freedoms in the republic, but rather to the fact that a large number of journalists had fled the country and journalistic freedom of expression inside of Tajikistan had come to a halt. The non-governmental organization Freedom House rated press freedoms in Tajikistan as "Not Free" beginning in 1992. Other NGOs, including Human Rights Watch, the Committee to Protect Journalists and the Glasnost Defense Foundation, have issued reports condemning the lack of press freedoms in Tajikistan. By 2007 the murder of journalists had ceased, but that year Human Rights Watch criticized the government of Tajikistan for its move to "tighten control over independent media activities" and the fact that journalists critical of the government are "routinely threatened with prosecution". In nearly every case of the killing of a journalist in Tajikistan, no suspects have been arrested or brought to trial.

== 1990 ==
- N.I. Matrosov was a Lenfilm employee. He was in Dushanbe when a confrontation between the protestors and government forces broke out. Matrosov was shot on 12 February at 3:40 p.m. when a sniper from government building opened fire on demonstrators in Dushanbe. Matrosov was filming the event from the second floor of his Tajikistan hotel room. In the same incident, a woman was killed as she stood beside her brother, photojournalist who was photographing the incident.

== 1992 ==
- Khushvaht Muborakshoev worked for Tajikistan State Television. He was killed in December at an unknown location by members of the People's Front, according to local journalists. He was a Pamiri.
- Filolisho Khilvatshoev worked for Payomi Dushanbe. He was killed in December at an unknown location by members of the People's Front, according to local journalists. He was a Pamiri.
- Jamshed Davliyatmamatov was a correspondent of the state-run Khovar Information Agency. He was killed in December in Dushanbe by members of the People's Front. He was a Pamiri.
- Mukhtor Bugdiev was a photojournalist with the state-run Khovar Information Agency. He was reportedly killed in December by members of the People's Front. Bugdiev was a Pamiri.
- Tavakkal Faizulloev, a Kulobi, was a correspondent for the newspaper Subhi Yovon in Yovon district, Kulob Oblast. On 17 November he was murdered in retaliation for writing anti-Islamic articles. The exact location of his death is unknown.
- Arcady Ruderman was a Belarusian documentary filmmaker who was killed on 22 September while filming a documentary for Ostankino about opposition leader Davlat Khudonazarov.
- Tura Kobilov was editor of the newspaper Bairaki Dusti. In June 1992 he was taken hostage and later shot and killed in Bokhtar district by unidentified captors, according to the Union of Journalists of Tajikistan.
- Shirindzhon Amirdzhonov was a correspondent for Tajikistan Radio. On 7 May he was killed along with Olim Zarobekov at the government-run Radio House in Dushanbe, according to the Union of Journalists of Tajikistan.
- Olim Zarobekov was a departmental head at Tajikistan Radio. On 7 May he was killed along with Shirindzhon Amirdzhonov at the government-run Radio House in Dushanbe, according to the Union of Journalists of Tajikistan.
- Murodullo Sheraliev was editor-in-chief of the newspaper Sadoi Mardum. On 5 May Sheraliev was shot and killed in the Tajikistan Supreme Soviet in Dushanbe, according to the Union of Journalists of Tajikistan.

== 1993 ==
- Tabarali Saidaliev was editor of the newspaper Ba Pesh. On 21 October he was kidnapped and his body was found in a cotton field three days later. The men who kidnapped him were dressed as security agents.
- Olimjon Yorasonov worked for the a regional newspaper in Vakhsh, Khatlon Province, and was killed in June or July. According to local journalists Yorasonov was murdered by the members of the militia People's Front.
- Pirimkul Sattori was a journalist from the Qurghonteppa newspaper Khatlon, who disappeared 28 May in Kulob oblast. His body was found several days later in a cotton field.
- Zukhuruddin Suyari was a correspondent for the government magazine Todzhikiston. His body was found in Qurghonteppa at the end of March. It is suspected that Suyari was murdered by National Front members because he was Gharmi.
- Saidmurod Yerov was the executive director of Farkhang magazine. In January 1993 Yerov was arrested by the National Front. His body was reportedly found in a mass grave in Dushanbe on 2 February.

== 1994 ==
- Khushvakht Haydarsho was secretary of the editorial board of the Tajik-language government newspaper Jumhuriyat. On 18 May he was shot dead near his home in Dushanbe. It is believed that his death is connected to a series of articles he published on crime in Tajikistan.

== 1995 ==
- Muhiddin Olimpur was found shot outside a park in Dushanbe in December. He was the head of the BBC's Persian Service bureau in Dushanbe.
- Muhammadsharif Holov was a writer and freelance journalist. On 16 November, Holov was killed when around 23:00 an unknown man in a mask entered his apartment and shot him with an automatic rifle. Holov was born in the village Olmalik in Tajikabad District on 4 February 1928. As a youth he had worked in the theatre and served in the military. He later went on to author several plays, become director of the Tajik State Youth Theatre, and was a member of the Writers' Union of Tajikistan.
- "TKD" Pochohona Sayfiddinov was a proofreader in the newspaper Hakikati Kurgonteppa and a correspondent for the newspaper Adabiet wa. He frequently published under the pseudonym Rustoi. On 29 September, Sayfiddinov's body was found in the Vakhsh River near the village of Kyzyl-Kala outside of Qurghonteppa. His body had been brutalized before being dumped in the river. He and his driver, Todzhiddin Homidov, had had their car stopped a few days earlier by unknown gunmen. Sayfiddinov was born on 2 August 1962 in the village of Boturobod in Bokhtar district. In 1986 he graduated from the Arabic language faculty of the school of Oriental language of Tajik State University. It is suspected that Sayfiddinov was murdered because he was a close friend of politician Abdumalik Abdullajanov and had published articles about him, which had been criticized in the official press.
- Muhammadmuslih Nadzhibulloev was a freelance writer and student in the Department of Journalism at the Tajik State University in Dushanbe. On 4 July, Nadzhibulloev was stabbed to death by unknown assailants. His body was found in Komsomolskaya Lake in the center of Dushanbe two days later. A few days before his death, Nadzhibulloev had defended a comparative analysis of the censorship of the independent newspaper Charogi and the modern press in Tajikistan. Nadzhibulloev was born in March 1974 in the village Vora in Panjakent district, Sughd.
- Olim Abdulov was director and writer for the television program Madzhro. On the evening of 15 May he was killed near his home by unknown persons. Abdulov was born 2 July 1970 in Dushanbe. He had graduated in 1992 from the Institute of the Arts.
- Zayniddin Muhiddinov was a freelance writer and former editor of the newspaper Hakikat. On 14 March, unidentified men in camouflage uniforms shot him dead in the Leninsky district.

== 1996 ==
- Viktor Nikulin was a correspondent for Russian Public Television (ORT) in Dushanbe. Nikulin was fatally shot at the door to his office on 28 March. He had received three threatening telephone calls a week before he was killed.

== 1998 ==
- Otakhon Latifi was an opposition politician member and one of the most notable journalists in Tajikistan. On 22 September, at around 8 am, Latifi was shot at point blank range outside his apartment in Dushanbe.
- Meirkhaim Gavrielov was a prominent leader of the Bukharian Jewish community in Tajikistan and journalist for fifty years. He was found strangled in his home on 8 June.

== 1999 ==
- Dzhumakhon Khotami was the chief spokesperson for the Interior Ministry of Tajikistan. On 5 July he was assassinated in Dushanbe. Khotami had been the anchor of a weekly TV program that reported on drug trafficking, corruption and organized crime. Speculation for his death revolves around the drug bosses whose name's he revealed publicly on television.

== 2000 ==
- Iskandar Khatloni was a Moscow-based correspondent for Radio Free Europe/Radio Liberty's Tajik Service. On the night of 21 September, Khatloni was attacked in his Moscow apartment by an unknown assailant wielding an axe. He died that night in a local hospital. Khatloni had recently been working on stories about the human-rights abuses in Chechnya.
- Aleksandr Alpatov was a photographer for the Khovar Information Agency. The Interior Ministry of Tajikistan reported on 1 September that Alpatov's body was found not far from his home in Dushanbe. He was 42 when he died. Authorities reported that he had been killed by a handgun equipped with a silencer.

== See also ==
- Human rights in Tajikistan
- List of newspapers in Tajikistan
- Civil War in Tajikistan
