= LGBTQ rights in Tajikistan =

- Tajikistan
- Legal status: Legal since 1998
- Gender identity: Legal (after sex reassignment surgery)
- Military: No

Family rights
- Recognition of relationships: No
- Adoption: No

Lesbian, gay, bisexual, transgender and queer (LGBTQ) people in Tajikistan face legal challenges and difficulties not experienced by the country's non-LGBTQ citizens. While same-sex sexual activity has been legalised in Tajikistan since 1998, same-sex couples are not currently eligible for the same legal protections available to married heterosexual couples.

LGBTQ people in Tajikistan frequently experience discrimination, harassment and violence from both the authorities and members of the public. Tajikistan is a Muslim-majority country with secular authorities.

In 2017, authorities in Tajikistan drew up an "official list" of LGBTQ citizens following two state operations named "Morality" and "Purge", suggesting that those named on the list would be required to undergo testing to prevent the "spread of sexually-transmitted diseases”. 367 gay citizens were named on the list, with 319 of that number being identified by the authorities as gay men and 48 being identified as lesbians.

In July 2022, the first-ever comprehensive anti-discrimination legislation in Tajikistan was allegedly drafted to contain gender identity and sexual orientation as prohibited grounds for discrimination, but these stipulations were dropped before the law was adopted. LGBTQ rights organisation ILGA-Europe stated in a 2025 report that "a working group was established in 2020 to draft the country’s first Anti-Discrimination law including sexual orientation and gender identity as protected grounds, by the time the law was adopted in July 2022, SOGI had been removed, leaving only “sex” as a prohibited ground for discrimination".

In 2022 and 2023, several raids were conducted by the police and numerous individuals alleged to be LGBTQ were forced to undergo HIV testing as a result. Those who tested positive were charged with “putting another person at risk of infection with human immunodeficiency virus” (Article 125, part 1 of the Criminal Code of Tajikistan) or forced to pay large bribes to the police in exchange for being released. In cases where the accused was not infectious due to regular antiretroviral treatment or where sexual partners had no complaint about their partner's HIV status, the accused were still subjected to the same treatment as others who had tested positive for HIV. The International Partnership for Human Rights (IPHR) has documented several cases of arbitrary detention of LGBTQ citizens by police and of extorting money from them.

== Legality of same-sex sexual activity and relationships ==
Same-sex sexual activity has been legal in Tajikistan since May 1998, after consensual sexual activity between men was decriminalised. Consensual sexual activity between women had never been criminalised.

Prior to 1998, the 1961 Criminal Code of the Tajik Soviet Socialist Republic had applied to the Republic of Tajikistan, as the latter is the direct legal successor state of the former, which assumed the laws of its predecessor when it became independent of the Soviet Union on 9 September 1991. The decriminalisation of sexual activity between men had occurred against the backdrop of Tajikistan becoming a full member of the United Nations in 1992.

The age of consent in Tajikistan is 16, regardless of gender or sexual orientation.

== Gender identity and expression ==
Transgender people in Tajikistan face stigma and discrimination on the basis of their trans identity. While transgender identity is not criminalised, transgender people cannot change their legal gender on their passports, even if they provide medical statements proving that they have undergone gender affirming surgeries. Medical services relating to gender affirmation are not available in Tajikistan and as a result, trans individuals must to go abroad in order to medically transition. Transgender people in Tajikistan have also reported that most doctors have no expertise in treatments required by trans people.

Tajik law allows for the reassignment of gender on some documents, however, medical institutions do not issue any official documents for this purpose, which makes the process difficult to complete for transgender people living in Tajikistan. LGBTQ activists based in Tajikistan interviewed for an academic publication stated that between three and six trans individuals have successfully changed their legal gender, with one person convincing a court he was intersex. A diagnosis of transsexualism is required to change legal gender on official documents and surgeries are also required for transgender women, while they are not required for transgender men. Tajik LGBTQ activists have also stated that bribes are often necessary to have one's gender legally recognised.

In Tajikistan, transgender people are evaluated by medical commissions consisting of three psychiatrists at a psychiatric clinic. However, the process is not regulated and cases are seen on a case-by-case basis.

== Living conditions ==
Even though the law does not prohibit same-sex sexual activity, the living conditions in the country are not favourable for LGBTQ people. Harassment from police and the public is common. In 2017, the authorities drew up an "official list" of LGBTQ citizens following two state operations named "Morality" and "Purge".

== Activism ==
In Tajikistan an anonymous non-governmental organisation (NGO) focuses solely on trans issues, while another anonymous organisation addresses general LGBTQ issues. Activists have no access to the Ministry of Health or other state authorities, advocating to improve the situation at the level of the state is therefore made impossible. A trans-focused NGO in Tajikistan has developed draft protocol on hormone replacement therapy (HRT), which has been used to educate endocrinologists.

== Public opinion ==
Islamic religious leaders have a significant influence on the position of Tajik society regarding LGBTQ topics. The Supreme Mufti of Tajikistan Saidmukarram Abdulkodirzoda has publicly condemned same-sex relations, calling them a "disaster". In addition, he condemned countries that have legalized same-sex marriages, and spoke out against human rights activists and laws to protect LGBTQ people from discrimination.

A number of Tajik psychologists and doctors consider homosexuality to be a form of addiction comparable to drug addiction and alcoholism, and provide "cure methods". These are considered to be pseudoscientific by the World Health Organization. There are several reported cases of disrespectful treatment to LGBTQ patients by medical staff.

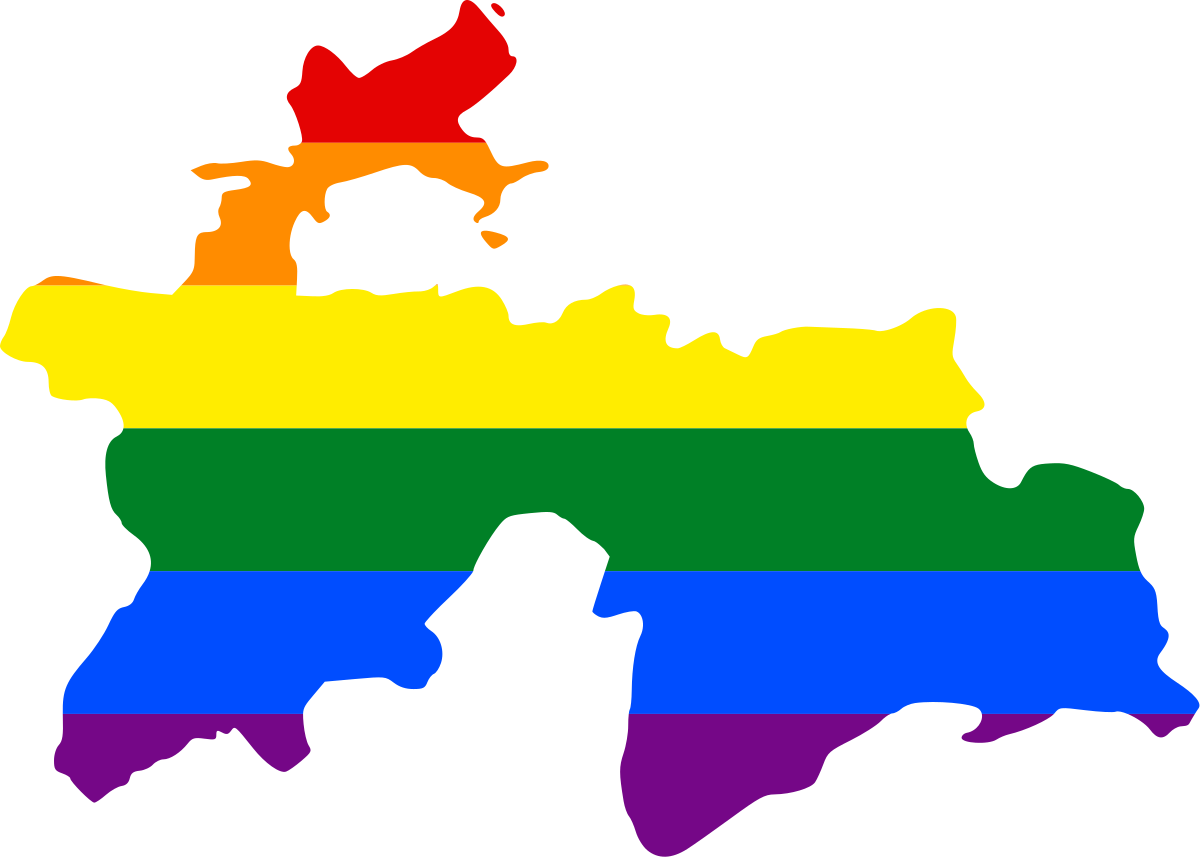
A map of Tajikistan featuring a rainbow pride flag, a symbol of the LGBTQ community

The public attitude towards LGBTQ people in Tajikistan has been described as "entirely negative", with the current state of affairs reflecting a "hypervisibility" of LGBTQ people, where homophobic and transphobic remarks from politicians have become part of everyday politics.

== Summary table ==
Same-sex sexual activity legal	Yes (Since 1998)
Equal age of consent (16)	Yes (Since 1998)
Anti-discrimination laws in employment only	No
Anti-discrimination laws in the provision of goods and services	No
Anti-discrimination laws in all other areas (incl. indirect discrimination, hate speech)	No
Same-sex marriages	No
Recognition of same-sex couples	No
Stepchild adoption by same-sex couples	No
Joint adoption by same-sex couples	No
LGBTQ people allowed to serve openly in the military	No
Right to change legal gender	Yes
Access to IVF for lesbians	No
Commercial surrogacy for gay male couples	No
MSM allowed to donate blood	No

== See also ==
- Human rights in Tajikistan
- LGBT rights in Asia
