= Dushanbe Synagogue =

19th C. Bukharan synagogue, part of the city's Jewish community center, since razed

- Russian: Душанбинская синагога
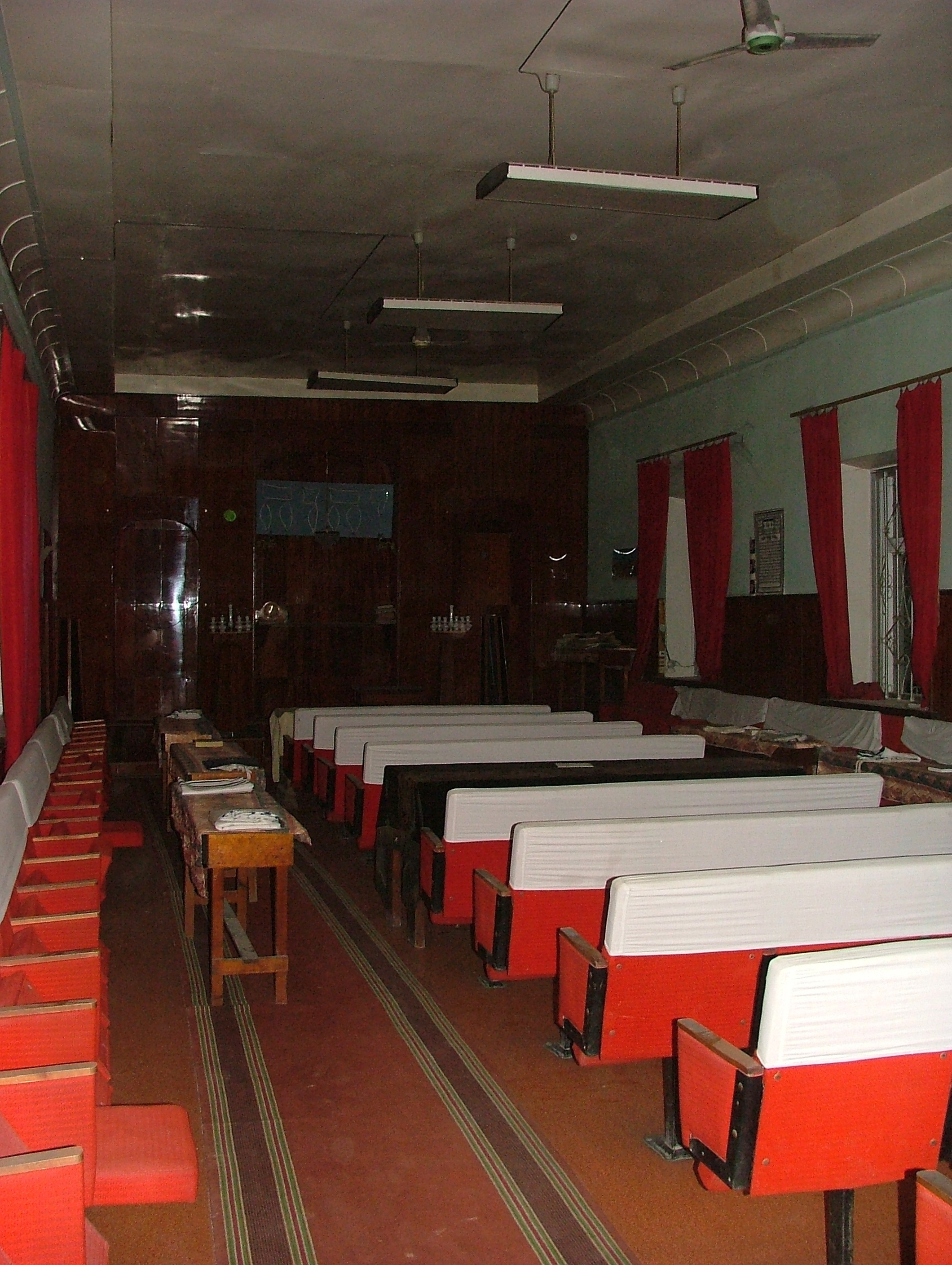
- The synagogue in 2008, prior to its demolition

- Location of the destroyed synagogue in Tajikistan

Religion
- Affiliation: Judaism (former)
- Rite: Bukharian
- Ecclesiastical or organizational status: Synagogue (19th century–1920); Profane use (1920–1958); Synagogue (1958–1997)
- Status: Demolished (New synagogue established in 2009)

Location
- Location: Dushanbe
- Country: Tajikistan
- Interactive map of Dushanbe Synagogue
- Coordinates: 38°30′48″N 68°43′38″E

Architecture
- Completed: Late 19th century
- Demolished: 29 June 2008

The Dushanbe Synagogue (Russian: Душанбинская синагога), also known as the Bukharian Synagogue (Бухарская синагога), was a former Bukharian Jewish congregation and synagogue, located in Dushanbe, the capital of Tajikistan. Constructed in the 19th century in one of the two Jewish Quarters in Dushanbe at the time, the synagogue was demolished between 2006 and 2008.

The synagogue was part of the Jewish community compound, which also included ritual buildings and a school. In February 2006, the Government of Tajikistan began demolition of the Jewish community compound as part of an urban redevelopment plan designed to make way for a new presidential residence, the Palace of the Nation, with adjoining landscaped areas. The demolition of the synagogue was delayed due to international protests and a series of court actions until the end of June 2008, when the old building was finally razed.

A new synagogue, the New Dushanbe Synagogue, was opened in 2009.

== The former synagogue building ==
Built by the Bukharian Jewish community in the late 19th century, the synagogue was seized by the Soviets in 1920 and nationalized in 1952. The Jewish community was again allowed access to the building in 1958, although the land remained in government hands (as all land was and still is state-owned in Tajikistan). The synagogue functioned after Tajikistan's independence in 1991 and throughout its civil war from 1992 to 1997. It was vandalized in 1995 in an incident which also included the ransacking of Jewish homes.

In May 2003, the Jewish community received an official letter ordering them to vacate the buildings, including the synagogue, by July of that year. Demolition, originally scheduled for 2004, began in early February 2006 with the destruction of the community's mikvah, or ritual bath, kosher butcher, and classrooms. Demolition of the synagogue was delayed until June 2008 due to international protests and a series of court actions. The synagogue was finally demolished on 22 June 2008.

=== Controversy over demolition ===
The government ordered the demolition of the entire Jewish community compound, including the synagogue, in accordance with city center regeneration plans, specifically the construction of the Palace of the Nation surrounded by extensive landscaped grounds. At the time demolition began, the synagogue was a functioning house of worship serving Dushanbe's small Jewish community (150 to 350 Jews). This was the last remaining synagogue in Tajikistan. While the government argued that the building was of no historical significance and could be demolished in accordance with city planning needs, the Jewish community stated that, as the last remaining Jewish house of prayer in a country that had been a home to Jews for at least two thousand years, the building was of considerable historical significance. The ownership of the building was also disputed. The Jewish community reported that it had documentation of its original (pre-Soviet) ownership of the building and the purchase of the land on which the synagogue had been constructed. The Dushanbe municipal authorities argued, on the other hand, that the state owned the land and the building since it underwent nationalisation in 1952 by the Soviet authorities.

Back in 2004, the Chief Rabbi of Central Asia, Rabbi Abraham Dovid Gurevich, raised the issue of antisemitism, hinting that the prospect of a synagogue standing next to the Palace of Nations would cause embarrassment to the authorities, but the US State Department framed the issue as "bureaucratic, rather than ideological"."Tajikistan: Small Jewish Community Fighting To Save Its Synagogue". RFERL.org. May 2004. UNESCO wrote a letter to the government of Tajikistan in 2004 that destruction of the synagogue would be in "contradiction with international standards for the protection of cultural heritage". The BBC reported in 2006 that "those opposed to the demolition had been threatened by officials and most of the congregation are afraid to speak out".

In March 2006 it appeared for a short time that the Government of Tajikistan had reversed their decision and would allow the Jewish community to keep the synagogue on the current site. In May 2006, however, it was announced that the synagogue would be rebuilt on "a suitable new site at the center of the city". Still, the Dushanbe Jewish community, spurred by international public opinion, continued its attempts to save the old synagogue on the original site, but in June 2008, the Dushanbe municipal courts finally ruled that the demolition of the old synagogue would proceed as ordered.

Although the government refuses to compensate the Jewish community for the loss of the building, it has allocated a plot of 1,500 square meters for the construction of a new synagogue on the banks of the Dushanbinka River in the Firdavsi municipal district in the west of the city. At the end of June 2008, immediately after the destruction of the old synagogue, Lev Leviev, the President of the Federation of Jewish Communities of the CIS (FJC), confirmed during a visit to Dushanbe that the construction of a synagogue on the new site would begin soon, financed by FJC, the Bukharian Jewish Congress, and private donors.

== The new synagogue building ==
The New Dushanbe Synagogue was opened on 4 May 2009 in an existing building donated for this purpose by Hasan Assadullozoda, a Tajik businessman and the brother-in-law of President Emomalii Rakhmon. The opening ceremony was attended by U.S. Ambassador Tracey Ann Jacobson, Tajik Deputy Culture Minister Mavlon Mukhtorov, and Imam Habibullo Azamkhonov.

== Gallery ==
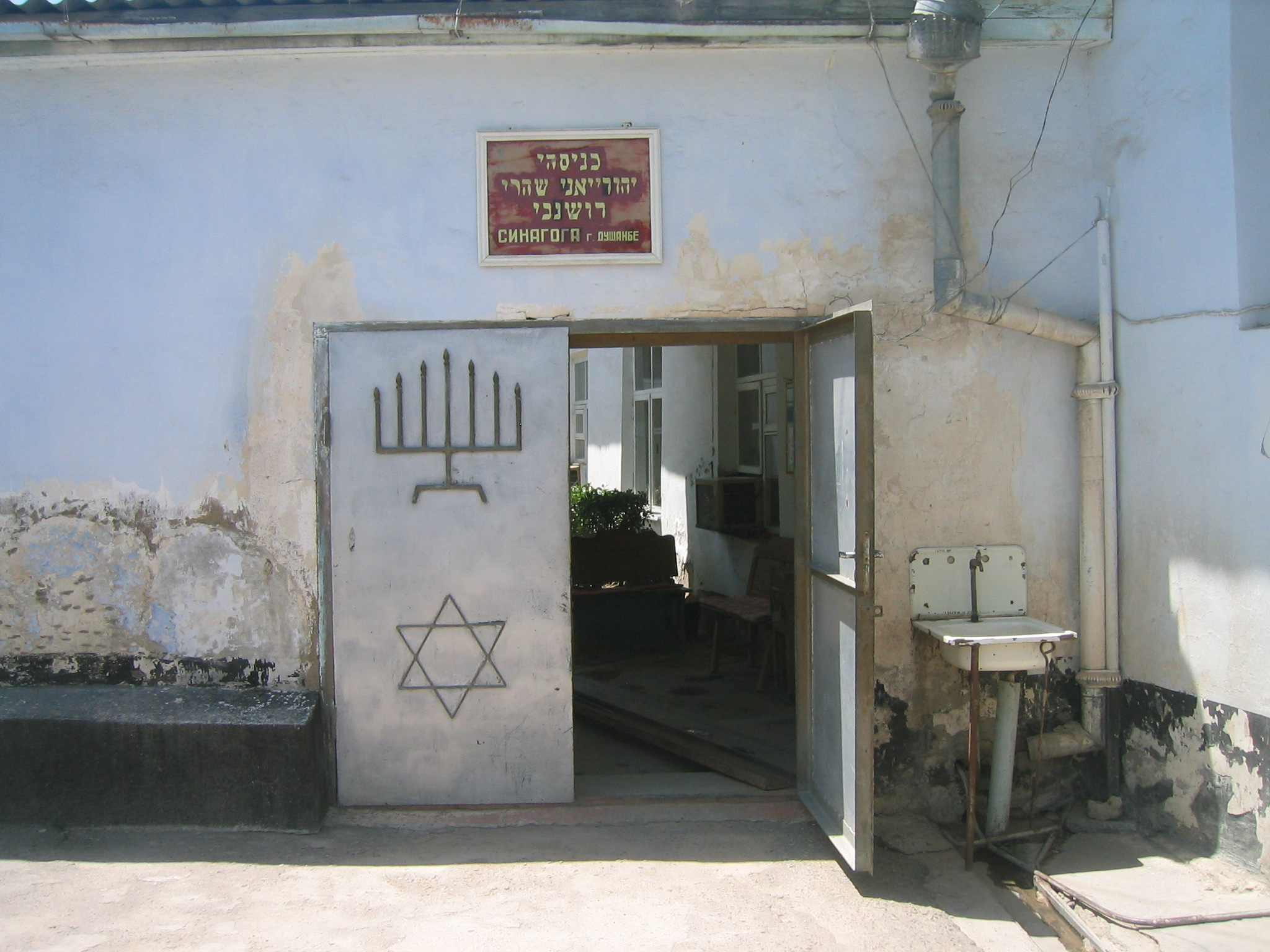
Main entrance of the destroyed synagogue, in 2006

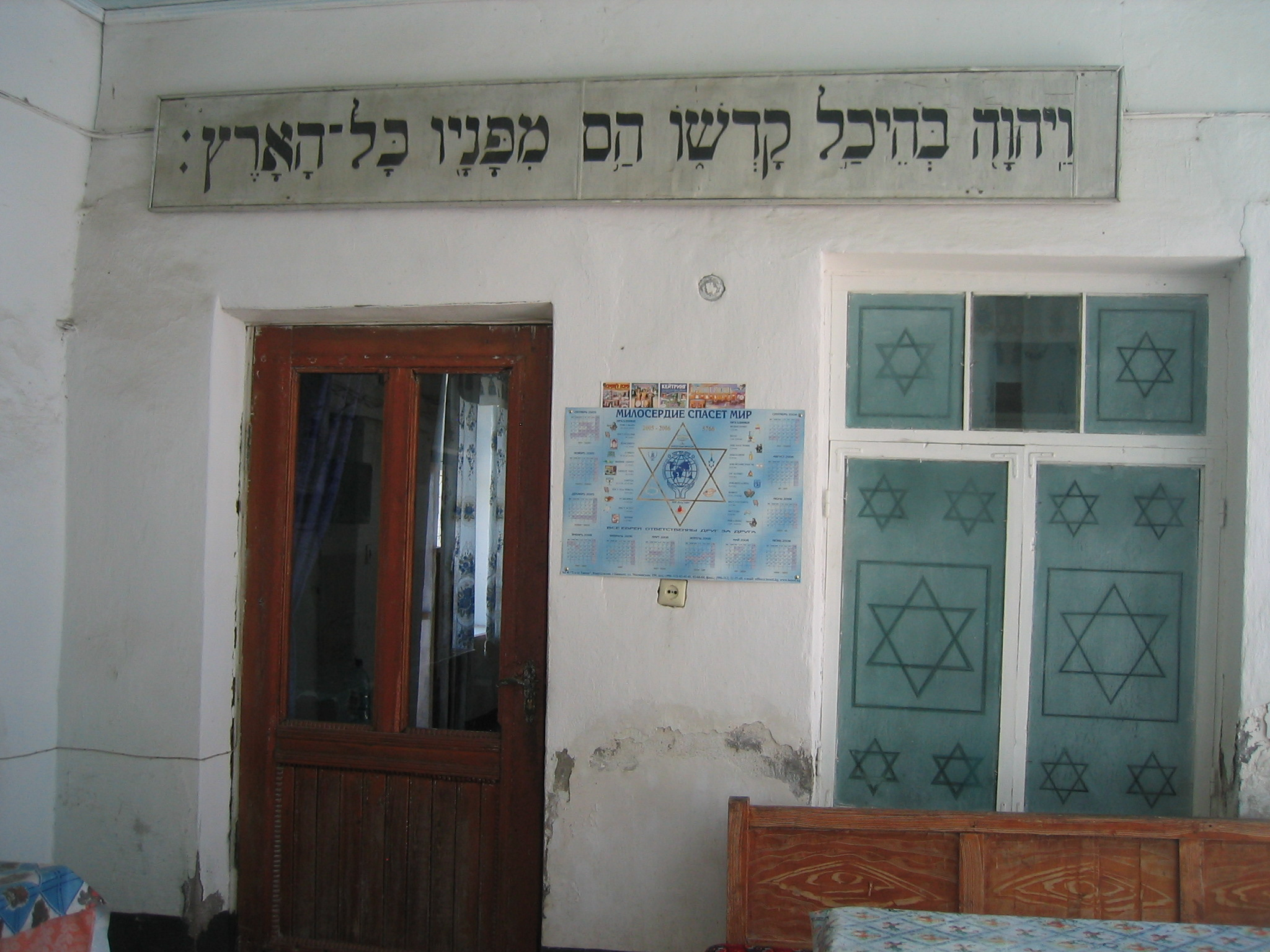
Courtyard of the destroyed synagogue, in 2006

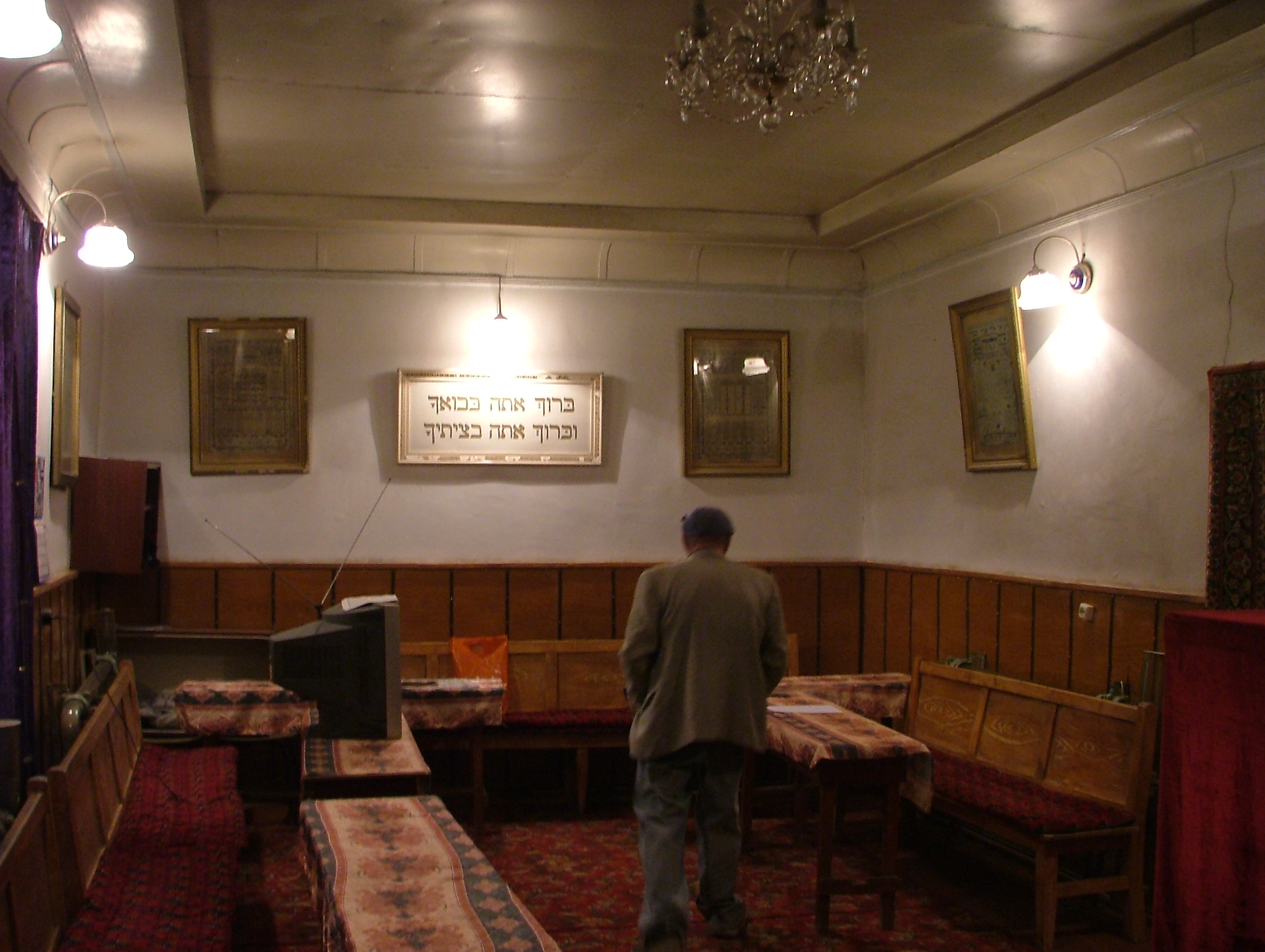
Social hall of the demolished synagogue, in 2008 shortly before it was demolished

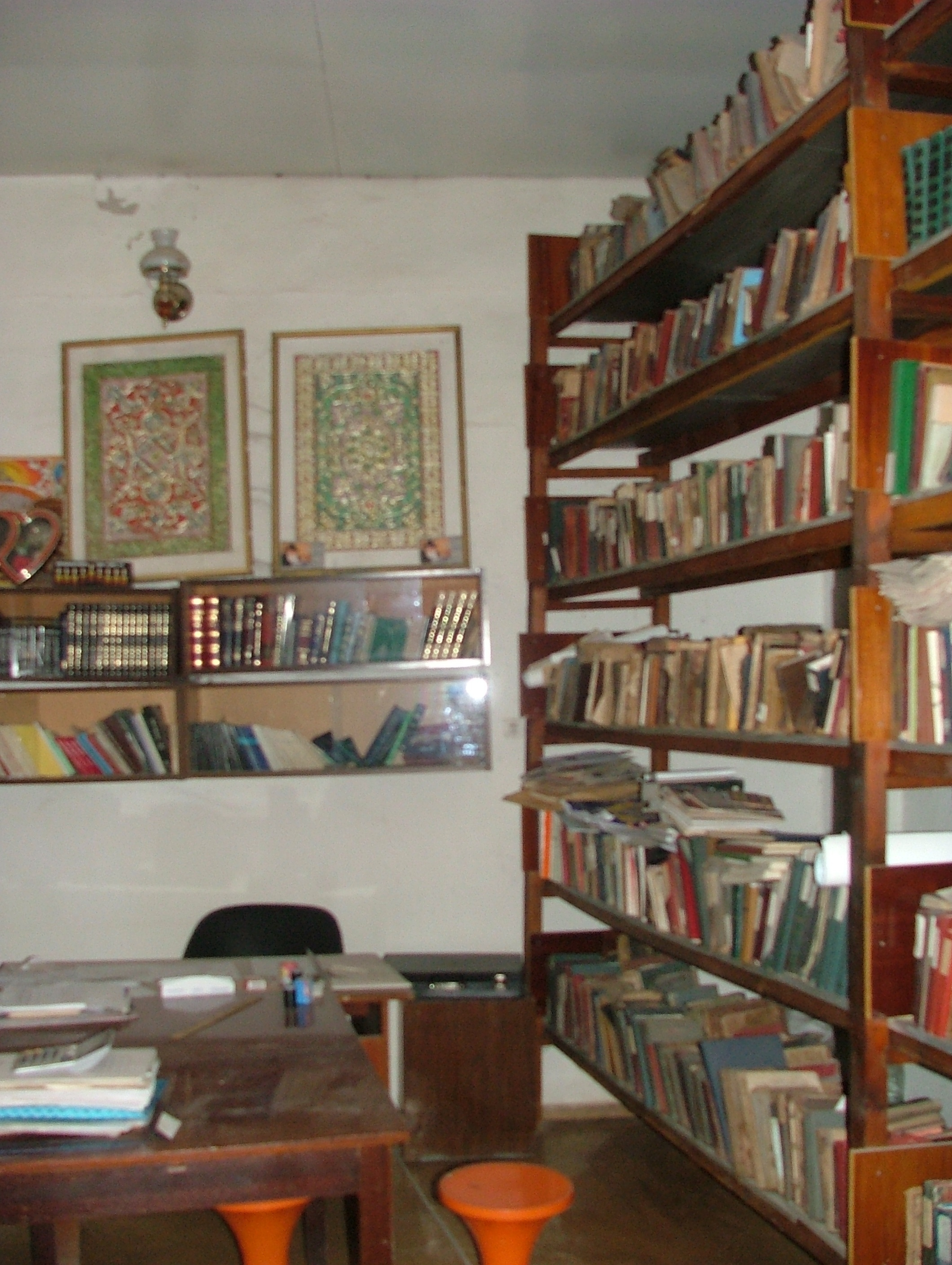
The library of the demolished synagogue

== See also ==
- Bukharan Jews
- Emirate of Bukhara
- History of the Jews in Tajikistan
- Mountain Jews
- Uzbek Jews
