= Human rights in Tajikistan =

Human rights in Tajikistan, a country in Central Asia, have become an issue of international concern. The access to basic human rights remains limited, with corruption in the government and the systematic abuse of the human rights of its citizens slowing down the progress of democratic and social reform in the country.

According to a report from the United States Department of State on human rights in Tajikistan, citizens are denied many of their rights and have limited ability to change the system of government. The report found this to be especially true in the case of prisoners, whose access to basic Human Rights was inadequate: there have been reports of torture, threats, and abuse of prisoners and detainees by security forces due, in part, to their ability to act with impunity. The denial of the right to a fair trial for those who stand accused of a crime has been identified as another issue, which can often contribute to harsh and life-threatening prison conditions as well as the blocking of international access to Tajikistan prisons. Pre-trial detention is typically longer than needed, and court proceeding are controlled by the prosecution. Prisons are overcrowded, and the incidence of tuberculosis and malnutrition is high among inmates.

Other restrictions include restrictions on media, freedom of speech, freedom of association, and freedom of worship, as well as restrictions on political opposition. Registration and visa difficulties, violence and discrimination against women, human trafficking, and child labour have also been reported. Tajikistan is also reported to be both a source and a transit point for human trafficking.

== Intimidation and killings of journalists ==
It has been reported that, in the 1990s, dozens of journalists were killed or disappeared under mysterious circumstances in Tajikistan. Together with increasing attacks on journalists, the 2005 parliamentary elections brought increased closures of independent and opposition newspapers. In 2003, the government blocked access to the only internet website run by the political opposition and in June 2014, YouTube was partially blocked by the government.

== Name change law ==
According to Ilan Greenberg, writing in The New York Times in 2007, The President of Tajikistan Emomalii Rahmon, stated that the Slavic "-ov" ending must be dropped for all babies born to Tajik parents. The policy came about in the wake of recent policies intended to remove vestiges of Russian influence on the country. In light of this, some Tajiks have expressed confusion or opposition at the denial of the freedom to choose the name for one's child.

== Freedom of religion ==
Some activities of religious groups have been restricted by the requirement for registration with the State Committee on Religious Affairs. Islamic pilgrimages are restricted, and religious groups such as the Jehovah's Witnesses have suffered occasional persecution: since October 22, 2007, Jehovah's Witnesses have had their practices banned by the government. In 2024, Tajik parliament has passed a law, banning the hijab to promote secular national identity. The ban was also imposed on children's festivities on Eid al-Fitr and Eid al-Adha

== Allegations of systematic violence against military conscripts ==
In June 2014 Global Voices Online reported that the practice of systematic violence against military conscripts (referred to as dedovshina) had risen to public awareness following a recent increase in incidences of manslaughter and suicides in the Tajik Army, and the April 17, 2014 death of Akmal Davlatov, who was beaten to death by his lance sergeant. Kidnapping of recruits was said to be a common practice in Tajikistan and victims have sometimes videotaped their own kidnappings.

== Examples of human rights violations ==
Within the country of Tajikistan, human rights violations have been a regular occurrence among the locals due to the refusal of rights from the government. These rights include religious rights, women's rights, journalists' rights, political rights and many more; these were established not only by the United Nations but the constitution of Tajikistan. When the country of Tajikistan became an independent nation after being under the control of the Soviet Union, a constitution was established in 1994. Chapter 2, Articles 14 to 47 of the Constitution of the Republic of Tajikistan is titled "Rights, Liberties, [and] Basic Duties of Individuals and Citizens". This chapter of the constitution states basic rights for the people of Tajikistan such as the rights to life and judicial protection. There have been many instances where the Government of Tajikistan has not upheld this constitution.

During 2016, human rights within Tajikistan were frequently violated, including imprisonment of opposition party members and leaders and persecution of human rights lawyers. Modification of the constitution by President Emomali Rahmon paved the way for him to reign over the country until his eventual death. The government of Tajikistan has made multiple arrests of activists within other nations that oppose government policies and ‘corruption’. In the year 2013, the Tajik government passed a law stating that torture while in custody was considered illegal, yet a UN report shows that these acts still occur. Men continue to violate the constitution by participating in physical, mental and sexual abuse against women. This has affected about a third of the women living in Tajikistan.

Tajikistan continues to struggle with human rights. High rates of unemployment, poverty, and crime contribute to this ongoing problem.

== Social media expression ==
In Tajikistan, significant changes to social media expression laws occurred on 15 May 2025, when President Emomali Rahmon signed a law removing criminal penalties for liking or reacting to posts classified as extremist or threatening public order. This amendment reversed part of a 2018 Criminal Code provision under which over 1,500 people linked to opposition groups, many having been convicted, and some facing prison sentences of 10 to 15 years for supporting or promoting terrorism-related content online, including simply liking or commenting on such posts. While the new legislation does not explicitly guarantee the release of those already imprisoned, it could provide grounds for appealing previous convictions.

== Historical situation ==
The following chart shows Tajikistan’s ratings since 1991 in the Freedom in the World reports, published annually by Freedom House. A rating of 1 is "free"; 7, "not free".^{1}

Historical ratings

Year	Political Rights	Civil Liberties	Status	President^{2}
1991	5	5	Partly Free	Qahhor Mahkamov
1992	6	6	Not Free	Rahmon Nabiyev
1993	7	7	Not Free	Emomali Rahmonov
1994	7	7	Not Free	Emomali Rahmonov
1995	7	7	Not Free	Emomali Rahmonov
1996	7	7	Not Free	Emomali Rahmonov
1997	6	6	Not Free	Emomali Rahmonov
1998	6	6	Not Free	Emomali Rahmonov
1999	6	6	Not Free	Emomali Rahmonov
2000	6	6	Not Free	Emomali Rahmonov
2001	6	6	Not Free	Emomali Rahmonov
2002	6	5	Not Free	Emomali Rahmonov
2003	6	5	Not Free	Emomali Rahmonov
2004	6	5	Not Free	Emomali Rahmonov
2005	6	5	Not Free	Emomali Rahmonov
2006	6	5	Not Free	Emomali Rahmonov
2007	6	5	Not Free	Emomali Rahmonov
2008	6	5	Not Free	Emomali Rahmon^{3}
2009	6	5	Not Free	Emomali Rahmon
2010	6	5	Not Free	Emomali Rahmon
2011	6	5	Not Free	Emomali Rahmon
2012	6	6	Not Free	Emomali Rahmon
2013	6	6	Not Free	Emomali Rahmon
2014	6	6	Not Free	Emomali Rahmon
2015	7	6	Not Free	Emomali Rahmon
2016	7	6	Not Free	Emomali Rahmon
2017	7	6	Not Free	Emomali Rahmon
2018	7	6	Not Free	Emomali Rahmon
2019	7	6	Not Free	Emomali Rahmon
2020	7	6	Not Free	Emomali Rahmon
2021	7	6	Not Free	Emomali Rahmon
2022	7	7	Not Free	Emomali Rahmon
2023	7	7	Not Free	Emomali Rahmon

== See also ==
- Capital punishment in Tajikistan
- Human rights in Asia
- LGBT rights in Tajikistan
- Bibliography of Tajikistani history

== Notes ==
1.Note that the "Year" signifies the "Year covered". Therefore the information for the year marked 2008 is from the report published in 2009, and so on.
2.As of January 1.
3.In March 2007, President Emomali Rahmonov changed his surname to “Rahmon”, dropping the “-ov” suffix.
