= Iskandar Khatloni =

Tajikistani politician (1954–2000)

Iskandar Khatloni (Tajik: Искандар Хатлонӣ; October 1954 – September 21, 2000) was a journalist from Tajikistan who worked for Radio Free Europe and was murdered in Moscow, Russia while covering the Second Chechen War.

== Life ==
In the 1980s at the onset of glasnost in the Soviet Union Khatloni began work as a BBC correspondent. In 1996, he became a correspondent for the Tajik language division of the Prague-based Radio Free Europe. In addition to his journalistic work, Khatloni was a distinguished poet and published four volumes of verse.

Before his death, Khatloni had been assigned to Moscow to report on human rights abuses in Chechnya.

== Murder ==
On the evening of 22 September 2000 Khatloni was attacked inside his Moscow apartment by an unknown, axe-wielding assailant. Khatloni was struck twice in the head and then stumbled onto the street and collapsed. He was later found by a passerby and taken to Moscow's Botkin Hospital, where he died that night of a serious head wound.

Speculation surrounding Khatloni's murder has focused on his coverage of the war in Chechnya, a politically sensitive topic that brought great peril to Russian-based journalists covering the subject. Just the previous spring, Igor Domnikov of Novaya Gazeta had been murdered while covering abuses by the Russian armed forces in Chechnya. Radio Free Europe's coverage of the Chechen conflict had caused the Russian Media Ministry to declare earlier in the year that the independent radio station was "hostile to our state." Moscow police opened an investigation of Khatloni's murder, but no arrests were ever made in the case.

Khatloni was survived by his wife Kimmat and a daughter from a previous marriage. He was buried in his native Tajikistan.

== See also ==
- List of journalists killed in Russia
- List of journalists killed in Tajikistan
