= Arkady Ruderman =

Belarusian filmmaker and journalist

Arkady Abramovich Ruderman (Belarusian: Аркадзь Абрамавіч Рудэрман, Russian: Арка́дий Абра́мович Рудерман; 7 January 1950 – 22 September 1992) was a Belarusian documentary filmmaker who was killed during the Civil war in Tajikistan in 1992.

== Biography ==
Arkady Ruderman was born in 1950 in Minsk, capital of the Byelorussian SSR.

Ruderman first gained fame in the Soviet Union in 1988 for his reporting on attempts by the communist authorities of BSSR to play down the centennial celebration of the Jewish painter Marc Chagall. Ruderman went on to direct several documentaries about the underside of the Soviet Union. His work won him accolades at the 1988 and 1989 Soviet film festivals. In November 1988 Ruderman was the first Russian TV journalist to interview Alexander Dubček, the former leader of Czechoslovakia who was deposed by Soviet forces after the Prague Spring uprising of 1968.

In September 1992 Ruderman traveled to Tajikistan to film a documentary for Ostankino about Davlat Khudonazarov, a fellow filmmaker and opposition candidate in the 1991 Tajikistani presidential elections. At the time the Civil war in Tajikistan was raging and journalists had become the target of murder. On 22 September 1992 Ruderman was killed while traveling by car along the road from Nurek Dam to the capital Dushanbe, an area that at the time was experiencing heavy fighting between government and opposition forces. The government ruled Ruderman's death a vehicular accident, but the circumstances surrounding his death continue to be questioned and the Center for Journalism in Extreme Situations suspects he may be one of the journalists murdered in Tajikistan.

== Filmography ==
- 1989 – Recrimination or The Counter-claim with Yury Khashchevatsky.
- 1985 – Who Will Correct Demeter's Error? (Kto Ispravit Oshibku Demetry?)

== See also ==
- List of journalists killed in Tajikistan
