= History of the Jews in Tajikistan =

The history of the Jews in Tajikistan (Tajik: Яҳудиёни Тоҷик/یهودیونی تاجیک Hebrew: יְהוּדִים טָגִ'יקִים) is long and varied. Many of the Tajik Jews were originally Bukharan Jews.

== History ==
Jews first arrived in the eastern part of the Emirate of Bukhara, in what is today Tajikistan, in the 2nd century BC. After the Communists came to power they organized the country into republics, including Tajikistan, which was first formed as an autonomous republic within Uzbekistan in 1924, and in 1929 became a full-fledged republic.

In an effort to develop Tajikistan, Soviet authorities encouraged migration, including thousands of Jews from neighboring Uzbekistan. The Ashkenazi population of the country grew to almost 10,000 by 1989. Most Jews settled in Dushanbe, the capital of Tajikistan, where they opened the Dushanbe synagogue. During World War II, a second wave of Ashkenazic Jews migrated to Tajikistan.

In the Soviet Union, including Tajikistan, beginning in the 1970s, Jews who were able, began to emigrate to Israel, as well as to the United States. By the late 1980s, many of Tajikistan's Jews had left. After the dissolution of the Soviet Union in 1991, Tajikistan gained independence and the country fell into a state of civil war between the government and Islamist forces. Continuous military conflict kept Tajik Jews in severe poverty and in fear for their lives. In 1992-1993 most of the country's Jews were evacuated to Israel or the US. Between 1989 and 2002, all but 197 of the country's almost 15,000 Jews emigrated, largely to Israel. Those Jews who emigrated were stripped of their Tajik citizenship and no longer hold a connection to the country.

As of the 2010 census, there are 36 Jews left in Tajikistan. All but two are Ashkenazi; the others are Bukharan, according to the 2010 census. They are mostly elderly, poor, and subjected to Antisemitic attacks and persecution. One tragic event in the community was the murder of journalist Meirkhaim Gavrielov. The Jewish community is moribund, reportedly barely able to function, and relies on aid from world Jewish organizations to survive. The majority of the country's Jews live in Dushanbe, which hosts the country's last synagogue. On January 15, 2021, the last Jew Jura Abaev of the city of Khujand, Tajikistan, died.

== Historical demographics ==
Tajikistan's Jewish population was almost non-existent in 1926, and it increased rapidly between 1926 and 1970. In 1970, Tajikistan's Jewish population was over fifty times larger than it was in 1926, numbering almost fifteen thousand people. Tajikistan's Jewish population continued growing between 1970 and 1989, but at a much slower rate. Since the collapse of Communism virtually all of the Jews in Tajikistan left and moved to other countries between 1989 and 2002. Most of the Tajik Jews who emigrated moved to Israel. In the late 1980s, around two-thirds of the population were Ashkenazi, and around one-third were Bukharian.

Historical Tajik Jewish population
Year	Pop.	±%
1926	275	—
1939	5,166	+1778.5%
1959	12,435	+140.7%
1970	14,627	+17.6%
1979	14,697	+0.5%
1989	14,580	−0.8%
2002	197	−98.6%
2010	36	−81.7%
2019	23	−36.1%
Source: The Jewish population data includes Mountain Jews, Georgian Jews, Bukharan Jews (or Central Asian Jews), Krymchaks (all per the 1959 Soviet census), and Tats.

== Dushanbe Synagogue ==
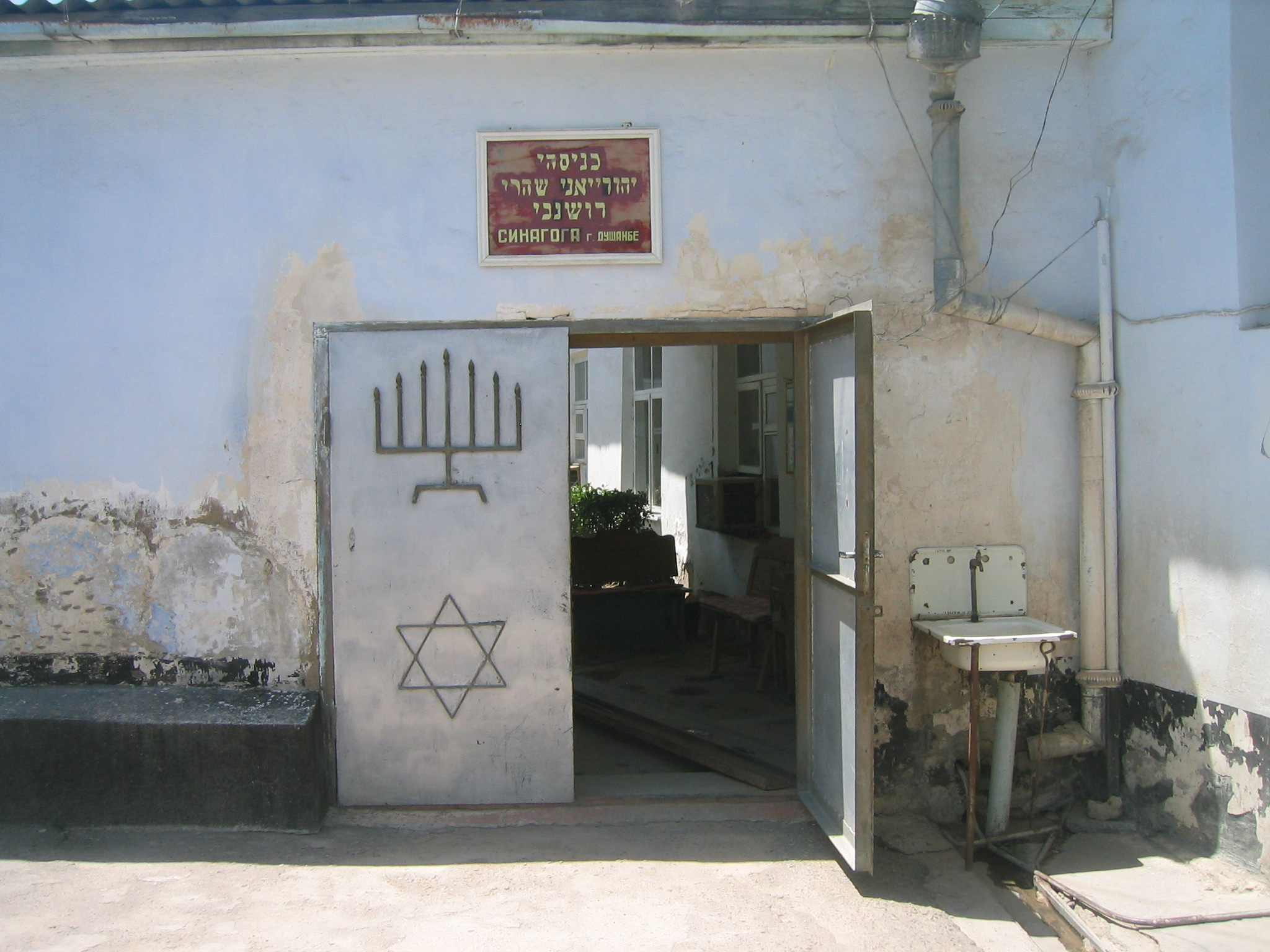
Old Synagogue, Dushanbe (main entrance), as seen in June 2006, two years before demolition.

As of 2006, the Dushanbe synagogue was the last remaining synagogue in the country, and was actively being used for worship. However, the Tajik government ordered the local Jewish community to vacate the synagogue, which was going to be demolished for a new presidential palace. After the destruction of the community's mikvah, kosher butcher, and several classrooms in February 2006, the demolition was temporarily halted due to protests from the Israeli and US embassies, as well as from worldwide world Jewish communities. The synagogue was finally razed by municipal court order in the end of June 2008, and the community was allocated a site in the western part of Dushanbe to build a new synagogue with financing from international Jewish organizations and private donors. Because of this incident, many Israelis and Americans of Tajik Jewish descent have negative views toward the Government of Tajikistan.

The new synagogue of Dushanbe was opened on 4 May 2009 in an existing building donated for this purpose by Hasan Assadullozoda, a Tajikistani businessman and the brother-in-law of President Emomalii Rakhmon. The opening ceremony was attended by U.S. Ambassador Tracey Ann Jacobson, Tajik Deputy Culture Minister Mavlon Mukhtorov, and Imam Habibullo Azamkhonov.

== See also ==
- History of the Jews in Central Asia
- Bukharan Jews
