= Kurer Tadzhikistana =

Weekly newspaper published in Tajikistan

Kurer Tadzhikistana (Russian: Курьер Таджикистана, lit. 'Tajikistan Courier') is a social and political weekly newspaper published in Tajikistan. It is one of the most widely circulated papers in the country. It is written in the Russian language.
