= Tajik Soviet Encyclopedia =

First universal encyclopedia in the Tajik language

- Language: Tajik and Russian
- Subject: General
- Genre: Reference encyclopaedia
- Publication place: Tajik SSR, USSR
- OCLC: 6330924

The Tajik Soviet Encyclopedia (Tajik: Энциклопедияи советии тоҷик) is the first universal encyclopedia in the Tajik language, published in Dushanbe from 1978 to 1988 in eight volumes. An additional volume, Tajik SSR, was published in both Tajik and Russian.

It includes more than 23,000 articles (VIII, p. 197) in a total of 4904 pages plus 242 folios (mostly in color) of additional figures and maps. Each volume measures 20 x 26 cm, printed in a triple-column format. It was published in a run of 15-23,000 copies.

The main editor when originally published was the president of the Academy of Sciences of the Tajik SSR, Mukhamed Asimov. The editor-in-chief by 1988 was Usman Nazirov.

== See also ==
- Great Soviet Encyclopedia
