= Kondara Gorge =

Gorge in western Tajikistan

Coordinates: 38°48′52″N 68°47′03″E

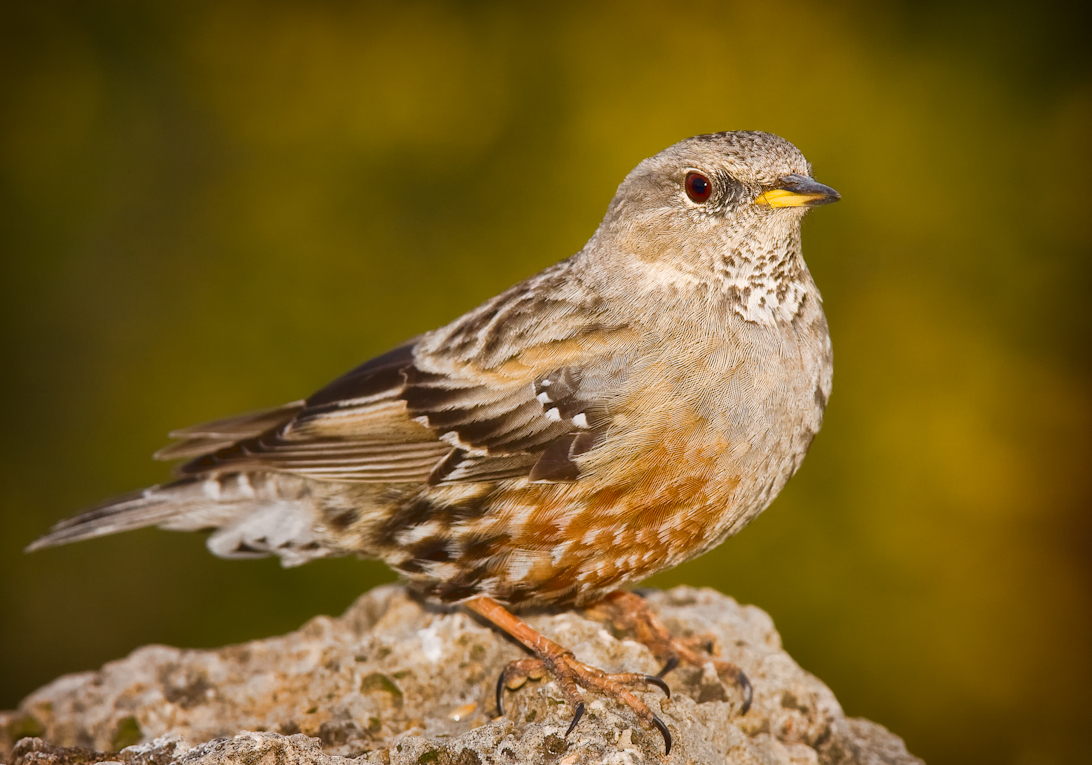
Alpine accentors breed in the IBA.

The Kondara Gorge is the gorge of the Kondara River in the southern spurs of the Gissar Range, north of Dushanbe in the Varzob District, one of the Districts of Republican Subordination, in western Tajikistan. It has been identified by BirdLife International as an Important Bird Area (IBA).

== Description ==
The Kondara River is a right bank tributary of the Varzob River, which it meets at an altitude of 1,100 m (3,600 ft). It flows west to east for 12–15 km (7.5–9.3 mi), in a valley about 2 km (1.2 mi) wide. The slopes of the gorge vary from gentle with a loose surface to steep and rocky. In the upper course of the river the gorge is blocked by the cliff of the watershed between the Luchob and Varzob rivers, a plateau known as the Ruidasht which varies in altitude from 2,400 to 2,850 m (7,870 to 9,350 ft). The IBA includes the entire gorge from the eastern slope of the Ruidasht plateau to the Varzob. The main part of the IBA lies in a zone of woodland and shrub vegetation with a relatively high annual rainfall of over 1000 mm 1,000 mm (39 in).

== Birds ==
The 1,000 ha (2,500 acres) IBA was so classified because it supports significant numbers of the populations of various bird species, either as residents, or as overwintering, breeding or passage migrants. These include Himalayan snowcocks, saker falcons, cinereous vultures, yellow-billed choughs, Hume's larks, sulphur-bellied warblers, wallcreepers, Himalayan rubythroats, white-winged redstarts, white-winged snowfinches, alpine accentors, rufous-streaked accentors, brown accentors, water pipits, fire-fronted serins, plain mountain finches, crimson-winged finches, red-mantled rosefinches, Caucasian great rosefinches and white-winged grosbeaks.
