= Ilariya Raykova =

Scientist-explorer (1896–1981)

Ilariya Alekseyevna Raykova (Russian: Илария Алексеевна Райкова; 30 September 1896, Ura-Tyube – 24 October 1981, Tashkent) was a scientist, biologist, geographer, botanist, educator, researcher-practitioner, Doctor of Biological Sciences (1944), Professor of the National University of Uzbekistan (1945), Honored Scientist of the Uzbek SSR (1945), Corresponding Member of the Academy of Sciences of the Uzbek SSR (1956), Honorary Member of the Russian Botanical Society, and the Russian Geographical Society (1970).

== Biography ==
Raykova was born in the ancient craftsmen's town of Ura-Tyube into the family of military priest Aleksey Raykov. At the age of 9 she lost her mother, and at 13 her father.

In 1913 she graduated from Samarkand Women's Gymnasium with a gold medal. In 1914 she entered the St. Petersburg Bestuzhev Courses, and in 1919 she graduated from the Biology Department of the Physics and Mathematics Faculty of the 2nd Petrograd University (former Higher Women's Courses) specialising in botany. During her studies she earned a living in the collection and study of vegetation of Aulie-Ata uyezd in the Syr Darya region of the Russian Empire between 1915-1916, and in Yamburgsky and Starorussky Uyezd of Saint Petersburg Governorate under Soviet rule (1918-1919). After her studies, she left to prepare for a professorship at the Department of Botany.

From 1919 to 1920, she worked as a researcher at the Saint Petersburg Botanical Garden, elected a 1st category researcher at the Botanical Institute of the Russian Academy of Sciences.

In 1920, she was elected a lecturer in botany in Moscow and was included in the organising group of National University of Uzbekistan in Tashkent:

At the end of January 1920, by order of the Council of People's Commissars of the Russian Soviet Federative Socialist Republic, the Main Sanitary Directorate provided National University of Uzbekistan with sanitary train № 159 (withdrawn from the southern front) as an emergency measure. On the night of 19 February 1920, the first university echelon with teachers, their families, equipment and part of the university library departed to Tashkent from Bryansk station in Moscow. Many Russian scientists - professors, lecturers and assistants who left for Tashkent, such as I. P. Rozhdestvensky, P. P. Sitkovsky, M. A. Zaharchenko, E. M. Shlyahtin, V. V. Vasilievsky, I. I. Markelov, G. A. Ilyin, <...> M. G. Popov, I. A. Raykova, A. I. Nosalevich, H. F. Ketov, D. A. Morozov, A. E. Shmidt, and others. These scientists resolved <...> to contribute to the spread of enlightenment and science in Turkestan. They founded their scientific schools there and educated many specialists who later became famous scientists both in Uzbekistan and beyond its borders. But first of all, it was necessary to train students, including those from the local population, for which purpose they created a rabfak and evening courses teaching the Russian language.

Raykova came to Tashkent under Lenin's decree on the establishment of a university in Central Asia, participated in the organisation of National University of Uzbekistan (1920). She was a teacher of the cabinet of cytology and biology of spore plants at the Department of Botany (1920-1925), head teacher of the Biology Department of the Pedagogical Faculty of National University of Uzbekistan (1922-1923), secretary of the Botanical Institute of National University of Uzbekistan, and secretary of the Scientific Council of the Botanical Garden of National University of Uzbekistan (1922-1930).

"She is one of the organisers of higher education in Central Asia, did a lot for the development of biological and agricultural research institutions and departments of higher educational institutions in Central Asia. I. A. Raykova's pupils successfully work in higher institutions, research institutes of Central Asian republics and other regions of our Motherland. She prepared 2 doctors and 20 candidates of sciences".
