= Telecommunications in Tajikistan =

The spread of telecommunications services in Tajikistan – telephony, radio, television and internet – has not been as extensive as in many other countries.

== Telephone ==
The conventional telephone system is in poor condition because it has received little investment in the post-Soviet era. As of 2007 there were 340,000 telephone lines in use, a ratio of one per 21 people. Many towns are not connected to the national network. In the early 2000s, the state telecommunications agency, Tajik Telecom, received international aid to upgrade the telephone system. In 2007 there were 3.5 million mobile telephones in use, compared with only 47,300 in 2003. This makes Tajikistan the 90th most cellular-capable country in the world. Among several cellular networks, the Babilon Mobile Company, a US-Tajik joint venture, claimed to have 40 percent of the market in 2006. The June 2006 launch of the KazSat communications satellite from Kazakhstan was expected to reduce the dependence of all the Central Asian countries on European and U.S. telecommunications satellites. Launch of a second KazSat is planned for 2009. The country's international calling code is 992.

== Radio ==
There are 20 radio broadcast stations: 8 AM, 10 FM, and 2 shortwave as of 2009. Only 10 are estimated to be transmitting. There were an estimated 1.291 million radios in Tajikistan in 1991, approximately 1 for every 3.9 people.

== Television ==
There are 24 licensed television broadcasting stations as of 2012, though only 15 are thought to be actively broadcasting. There were an estimated 860,000 televisions in Tajikistan in 1991, approximately 1 for every 5.9 people. Televizioni Tojikiston is the state television channel of Tajikistan, a successor to the Soviet republican program of the Central Soviet Television.

The head of the Committee for TV and Radio-broadcasting, Nouriddin Said, told reporters in Dushanbe on July 22, 2020 that 13 national TV channels, 35 private TV stations, 10 national radio stations, 24 private radio stations and 14 audiovisual production studios now operate in the country. To-date, only 65 percent of Tajikistan’s population has access to digital television, he noted.

== Internet ==
Internet use has grown slowly - in 2004 only seven Internet service providers were in operation. However, there were 1,158 Tajikistani internet hosts in 2008, placing Tajikistan 150th in the world. As of 2005, there were 19,500 internet users in Tajikistan, making it the 190th internet-connected country in the world at the time. Tajikistan's internet country code is .tj.

== See also ==
- Tajikistan
