= Jumhuriyat =

Jumhuriyat (Tajik: Ҷумҳурият, lit. 'Republic') is a thrice weekly newspaper published in Tajikistan. It is one of the most widely circulated papers in the country.

== History and profile ==
The paper was established in 1925. The headquarters is in Dushanbe. It is owned by the Presidency of Tajikistan. It is written in the Tajik language.
