= Sadoi mardum =

- Type: Daily newspaper
- Format: Online
- Owner(s): Government of Tajikistan
- Founded: 1991
- Political alignment: Pro-government
- Language: Tajik
- Website: https://sadoimardum.tj/

Sadoi mardum (Voice of the People) was established in 1991 and is a thrice weekly newspaper published in Tajikistan, in both print and online formats. It is one of the most widely circulated papers in the country. It is written in the Tajik language. The paper covers primarily social and economic issues and is generally viewed as having a Pro-government political leaning.

== See also ==
- Khalk ovozi (also meaning "Voice of the People" but in Uzbek.)
- Sadoi mardum (homepage)
