= Tojikiston (newspaper) =

Ewspaper published in Tajikistan

Tojikiston (Tajikistan) is a thrice weekly newspaper published in Tajikistan. It is one of the most widely circulated papers in the country. It is written in the Tajik language.
