= Tojikiston Soveti =

Tojikiston Soveti (Soviet Tajikistan), also known as Dushanbe Tojikiston Soveti, was a newspaper published in Dushanbe, Tajikistan. It was published during the Soviet Union period, published between 1955 and 1991. The paper, run by the central committee of the Communist Party of Tajikistan, was a continuation of the earlier papers Idi Tojik (Feast of Tajik) and Bedorii Tojik (Tajik's Awakening) (1925–28), and Tojikistoni Surkh (Red Tajikistan) (1928–1955).
