= Agricultural University of Tajikistan =

University in Dushanbe, Tajikistan

Coordinates: 38.6094°N 68.7869°E

Tajik Agrarian University 'S. Shotemur' (TAU) (Russian: Таджикский аграрный университет им. Ш. Шотемура; Tajik: Донишгоҳи аграрии Тоҷикистон ба номи Ш. Шотемур) is a university in Tajikistan, in the capital of Dushanbe.

== History ==
In 1931, the 'Central Asian Fruit-and-Vegetable Institute' was founded in the city of Khujand (former Leninabad). In 1934 it was reorganized and renamed into the 'Tajik Agricultural Institute'. In 1992, the Institute was again reorganized into 'Tajik Agrarian University'. The Government of Tajikistan decided (#311 from October 31, 2009) to rename it as 'Tajik Agrarian University Shirinsho Shotemur'.

== Academics ==
TAU has a current enrolment of 6500 students.

It has more than 35,000 alumni. There are nine faculties at the university: Agronomy, Agribusiness, Zoo-engineering, Veterinary science, Economics, Horticulture and Biotechnology of Agriculture, Mechanization of Agriculture and Hydromeliorative methods, educating experts in 31 specialities.
