= Glasnost Defense Foundation =

Russian non-profit organization

- Фонд защиты гласности
- Founder: Yegor Yakovlev, Vladimir Molchanov, Igor Golembiovsky, Mark Rozovsky, Elem Klimov, Aleksei German and others
- Fields: Press freedom
- Leader: Alexei Simonov
- Website: www.gdf.ru

Glasnost Defense Foundation is a non-profit organization with the stated goals of the defense of journalists, journalism, and freedom of expression in Russia. Its president is Alexei Simonov, a member of the Moscow Helsinki Group and the Presidential Council on Civil Society and Human Rights.

Glasnost Defense Foundation (GDF) was organized on June 6, 1991, by Yegor Yakovlev, Vladimir Molchanov, Igor Golembiovsky, Mark Rozovsky, Elem Klimov, Aleksei German and other prominent Russian filmmakers and journalists. It provides legal help to journalists in conflict situations, supports the families of dead journalists and records individual cases of journalist's rights violations in Russia in collaboration with Reporters Without Borders and Amnesty International.

== Reports ==
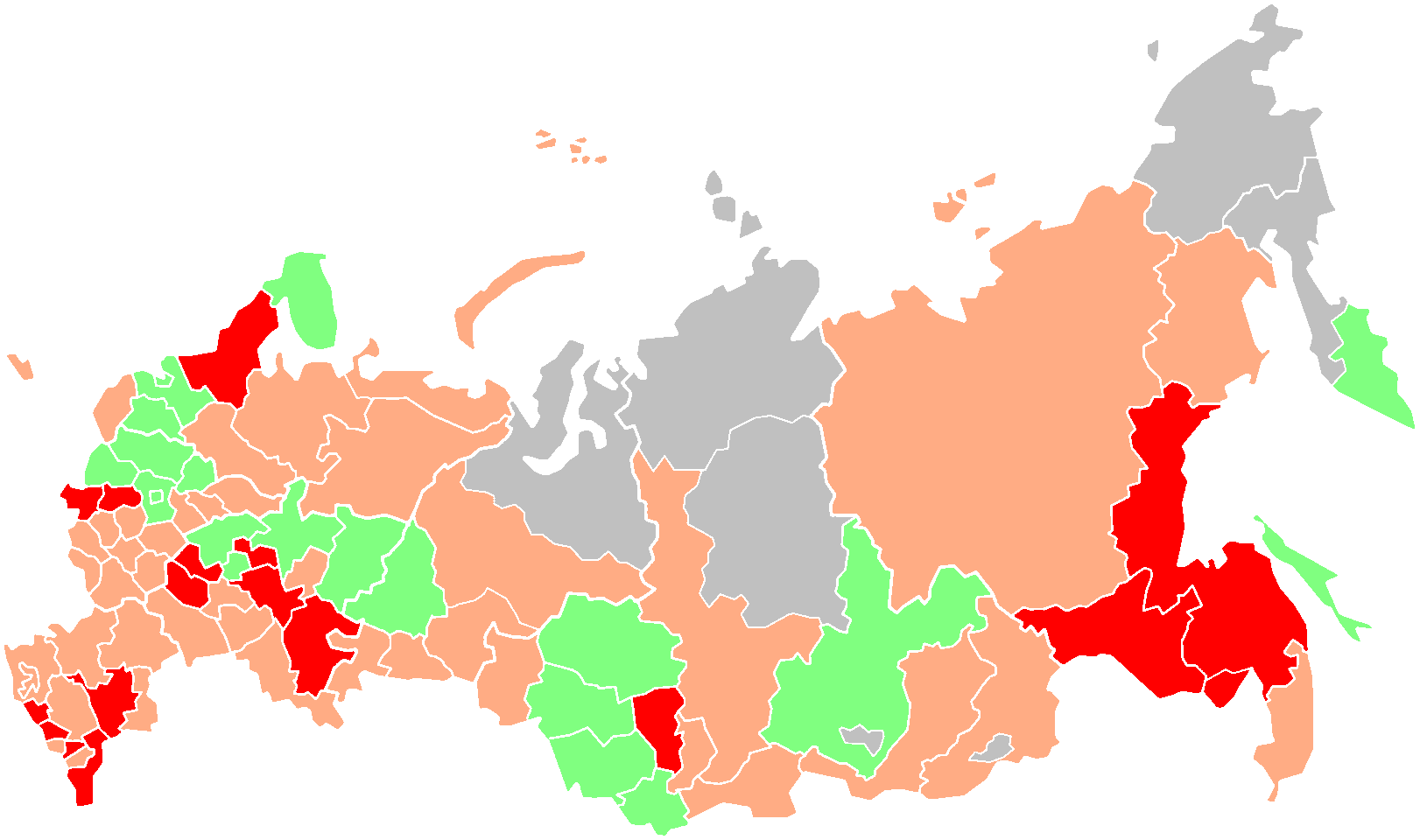
Press freedom in the Russian regions, 2001-2006 Green: Quite free Orange: Not quite free Red: unfree Grey: No data No free region was found Source: Glasnost Defense Foundation

The list of criminal cases compiled by the Glasnost Defense Foundation in 2006 represents 1,345 conflicts including 9 killed and 69 assaulted journalists. In 2005, the list of all recorded cases includes 6 murders, 63 assaults, 12 pogroms of editorial offices, 23 cases of censorship, 42 criminal prosecutions, 11 illegal layoffs, 47 arrests, 382 lawsuits, 233 cases of obstruction, 23 closings of editorial offices by authorities, 10 evictions, 28 confiscations of printed production, 23 cases of stopping broadcasting, 38 refusals to distribute or print production, 25 acts of intimidation, and 344 other violations of Russian journalist's rights .

== Structure ==
The Glasnost Foundation is a registered NGO with over 30 regional and volunteer centers in the Russian Federation. It is a member of the International Freedom of Expression Exchange.

It works in close collaboration with Reporters without Borders, Amnesty International, International PEN, Memorial society, and other human rights organizations. It also works with the Russian PEN Club and the journalism faculty of Moscow State University. The Foundation also receives financial support from the MacArthur Foundation, the National Endowment for Democracy, the Ford Foundation and the Embassy of the Netherlands in Moscow.

In November 2015, the Russian Ministry of Justice designated Glasnost Defence Foundation a "foreign agent" NGO, drawing criticism from the OSCE and the President's Human Rights Council.

== See also ==
- Glasnost
- Human rights in Russia
- Media freedom in Russia
