= Khovar =

State-owned news agency of Tajikistan

- Native name: Ховар
- Type: Agency
- Industry: News media
- Founded: December 31, 1925; 100 years ago
- Headquarters: Dushanbe, Tajikistan
- Key people: Saidali Siddik
- Products: Wire service
- Owner: Government of Tajikistan
- Website: khovar.tj

National Information Agency of Tajikistan "Khovar" (Tajik: Агентии миллии иттилоотии Тоҷикистон «Ховар») is the official state media news agency of Tajikistan.

== History ==
The news agency was established on December 31, 1925, as the Tajik Telegraph Agency (TTA) during the Tajik Autonomous Soviet Socialist Republic era. During World War II, the agency provided special photo reports, describing the situation on the Eastern Front as the Soviet Union fought Nazi Germany, this despite much of its staff joining the Red Army. After the war, the TTA continued to expand its capabilities. On April 10, 1992, the TTA was renamed Tajik News Agency (TNA) Khovar, and on April 30, 2004, it gained the status of the central state information body under the government of Tajikistan and was renamed the National Information Agency of Tajikistan (NIAT) Khovar.

Radio Khovar FM, a subsidiary established in 2011, has since become one of the most popular radio stations in the country.
