= Khalk ovozi =

Newspaper published in Dushanbe, Tajikistan

Khalk ovozi (Tajik: Халқ овози; "voice of the people") is an Uzbek-language, thrice-weekly newspaper published in Dushanbe, Tajikistan, whose main goal is to support ethnic Uzbeks in Tajikistan.

== History and profile ==
Khalk Ovozi was established in 1929 and is published by the Parliament of Tajikistan. Written in the Uzbek language, it is one of the most widely circulated papers in the country. In Soviet times, newspapers were published daily, and the paper's circulation reached 93.5 thousand copies.

Until 1955, it was called Kizil Tozhikiston (Red Tajikistan), after which it was renamed Council Tozhikiston (Soviet Tajikistan). In the early 1990s, its name changed once more, to the current Khalk Ovozi. The newspaper was awarded the Order of the Red Banner of Labour in 1963.
