= Navdonak =

- Location in Tajikistan
- Coordinates: 38°59′N 70°13′E
- Country: Tajikistan
- Region: Districts of Republican Subordination
- District: Rasht District
- Elevation: 1,355 m (4,446 ft)

Population
  - Total: 7,438

Navdonak (Tajik: Навдонак) is a village in the jamoat Kalai Surkh in the Rasht District (one of the Districts of Republican Subordination) in central Tajikistan. Navdonak is east of Dushanbe in the Vakhsh valley and has a Köppen climate classification of Dsa and experiences wet and cold winters with dry cool summers. The village is close to the town of Gharm.

== History ==
During the 1920s the area was a hotbed for the Basmachi, the anti-Soviet resistance in Central Asia. During the Civil War in Tajikistan from 1992 to 1997, the area was a hotbed for Islamist forces, and October 2010, the Tajik Interior Ministry asserted it had killed three militants nearby at Gharm amid an alleged rise in Islamic militancy in the region.
