= Rasht District =

Eastern district in the Region of Republican Subordination in Tajikistan

Rasht District Ноҳияи Рашт (Tajik) Раштский район (Russian)
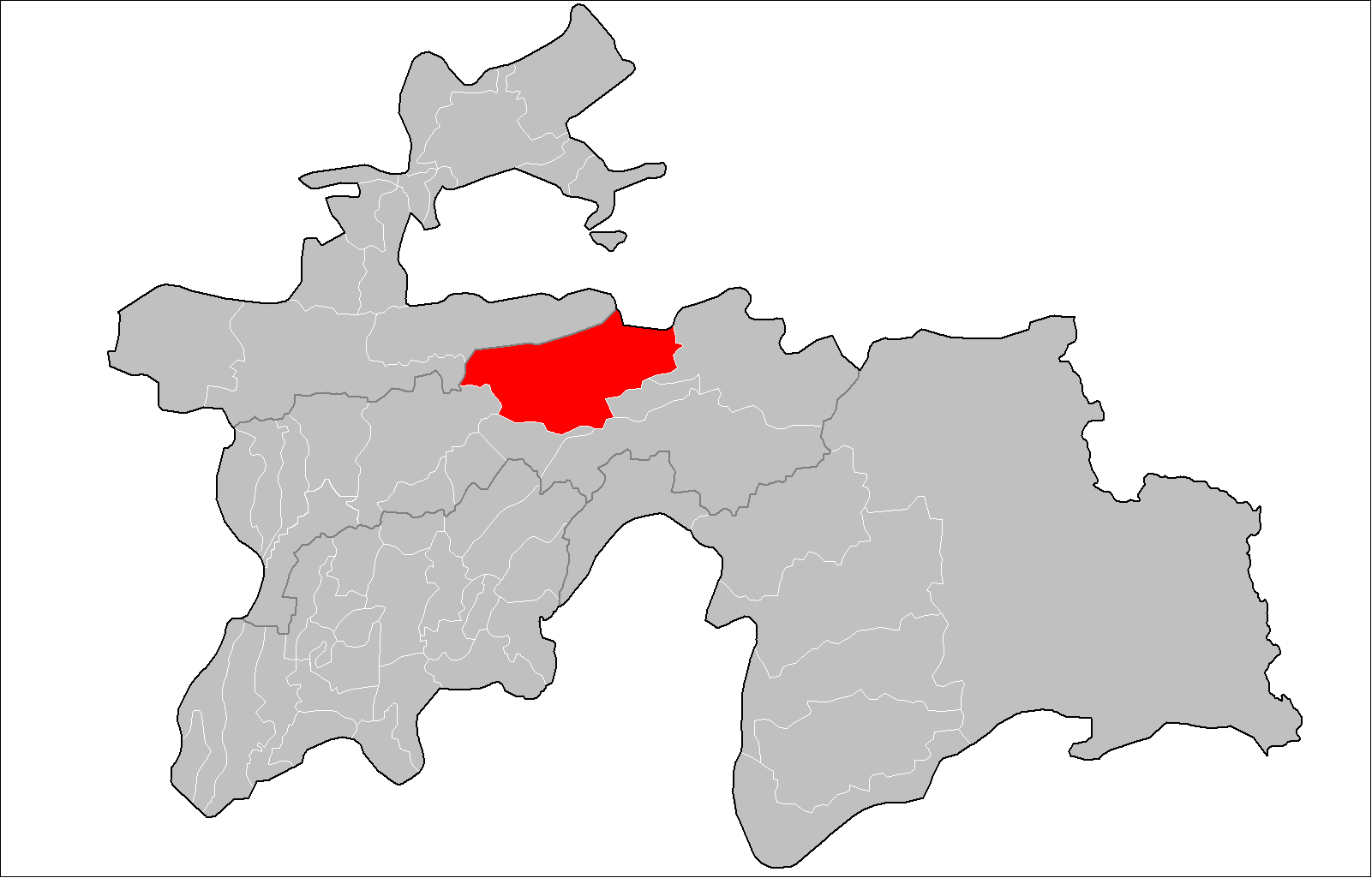
- Location of the district in Tajikistan
- Coordinates: 39°05′N 70°30′E
- Country: Tajikistan
- Region: Districts of Republican Subordination
- Capital: Gharm

Area
  - Total: 4,600 km^{2} (1,800 sq mi)

Population (2020)
  - Total: 127,400
  - Density: 28/km^{2} (72/sq mi)
- Time zone: UTC+5
- Website: rasht.tj

Rasht District (Tajik: ноҳияи Рашт Nohiyai Rasht, formerly called Gharm District (Tajik: ноҳияи Ғарм)) is a district in Tajikistan, one of the Districts of Republican Subordination. It lies between the city of Vahdat in the west and Lakhsh District in the east; its southern neighbors are Nurobod, Sangvor, and Tojikobod districts; its northern border runs along the eastern finger of Sughd Region and along the international border with Kyrgyzstan. Its capital is the town of Gharm. The population of Rasht District are known as Gharmi Tajiks. The population of the district is 127,400 (January 2020 estimate).

== Administrative divisions ==
The district has an area of about 4,600 km^{2} (2,000 sq mi) and is divided administratively into two towns and twelve jamoats. They are as follows:

Jamoat	Population (Jan. 2015)
Gharm (town)	8,000
Navobod (town)	5,000
Askalon	4,114
Hijborak	5,609
Hoit	7,716
Jafr	7,245
Kalai Surkh	15,711
Kalanak	10,411
Nusratullo Makhsum	13,762
Navdi	15,425
Obi Mehnat	2,304
Rahimzoda	12,114
Tagoba	5,890
Yasman	

== History ==
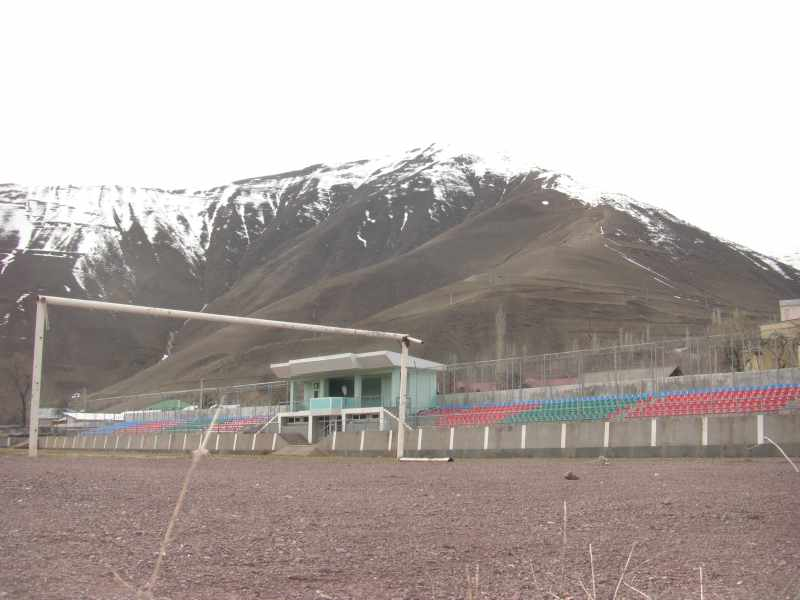
Gharm Stadium in the south of the city Gharm.

During the 1920s Rasht was a hotbed for the Basmachi, the anti-Soviet resistance in Central Asia. In 1929 Basmachi commander Faizal Maksum crossed from Afghanistan into Tajikistan and briefly captured the city Gharm, only to later be expelled by Soviet forces. In the 1920s, during the reorganization of borders in Central Asia, a Gharm Oblast was created out of the old Qarategin and Darvaz, districts of Bukhara. The Garm Oblast consisted of much of the Qarategin Valley, as well as the district of Kalai-Khumb. During the 1950s much of the population of Gharm was forcibly relocated by the government to western Tajikistan. This population of people was known as the Gharmis.

In 1955 the Garm oblast was abolished and the land was redistributed to the Gorno-Badakshan Autonomous Oblast and the Regions under Republican Subordination Oblast. The Gharmis continued to have a distinct clan identity in Tajikistan and when the Civil War in Tajikistan broke out in the newly independent country in 1992 many Gharmis sided with the Islamic opposition. During the war many Gharmis were targeted for massacres. The town of Gharm was controlled by the opposition during the later part of the civil war in Tajikistan.

In 1998 four members of the United Nations Mission of Observers in Tajikistan were murdered by armed men allied with the United Tajik Opposition. These victims were Yutaka Akino, a noted Japanese scholar of Central Asian history, Major Ryszard Szewczyk from Poland; Major Adolfo Scharpegge from Uruguay; and Jourajon Mahramov from Tajikistan.

In July 2007 Rasht District suffered a devastating earthquake (5.5 on the Richter scale).
