= 1949 Khait earthquake =

Earthquake in present-day Tajikistan

1949 Hait earthquake
- Location within Tajikistan
- UTC time: 1949-07-10 03:53:41
- ISC event: 896645
- USGS-ANSS: ComCat
- Local date: 10 July 1949
- Local time: 09:45
- Magnitude: 7.5 M_{w}
- Depth: 18 km (11 mi)
- Epicenter: 39.2°N 70.8°E
- Areas affected: Gharm Oblast, Tajik SSR, Soviet Union (now in Tajikistan)
- Max. intensity: >MMI IX (Violent)
- Casualties: ~7,200 dead

The 1949 Khait earthquake (Russian: Хаитское землетрясение 1949 года; Tajik: Заминларзаи Ҳоит 1949) occurred at 09:45 local time (03:53 UTC) on 10 July in Gharm Oblast of the Tajik SSR of the Soviet Union (within the modern boundary of Tajikistan). It had a magnitude of 7.5 and triggered a series of landslides that together led to 7,200 deaths.

== Tectonic setting ==
The earthquake occurred in a tectonically complex region at the southern edge of the Tien Shan. The southern margin of the Tien Shan is characterised by combination of dextral strike-slip faulting and southward thrusting over the Tajik Basin to the south along the Gissar-Kokshaal fault zone. At the same time the Tajik Basin is being shortened in response to oblique collision with the Pamirs, forming a series of north–south to SW-NE trending thrust faults, the earthquake is thought to have been caused by movement on the Vakhsh thrust, one of these faults.

== Damage ==
In the area of maximum felt intensity (>IX) most kishlaks were completely destroyed. Most of the fatalities were caused by numerous landslides triggered by the earthquake. The town of Khait (modern spelling Hoit (Tajik: Ҳоит)) and the village of Khisorak were almost completely destroyed by the Khait landslide. Numerous kishlaks in the Yasman River valley were overwhelmed by the loess flowslide that swept down the whole length of the valley. Other kishlaks were destroyed by loess flowslides in the lower Obi-Kabud River valley and on the north side of the Surkhob River valley. Published estimates of the number of casualties range from 5,000 to 28,000. A more recent study, based on the size of affected settlements and the likely population density, gave an estimate of 7,200 of which about 800 were caused by the Khait landslide and 4,000 by the Yasman valley flowslide.

== Characteristics ==
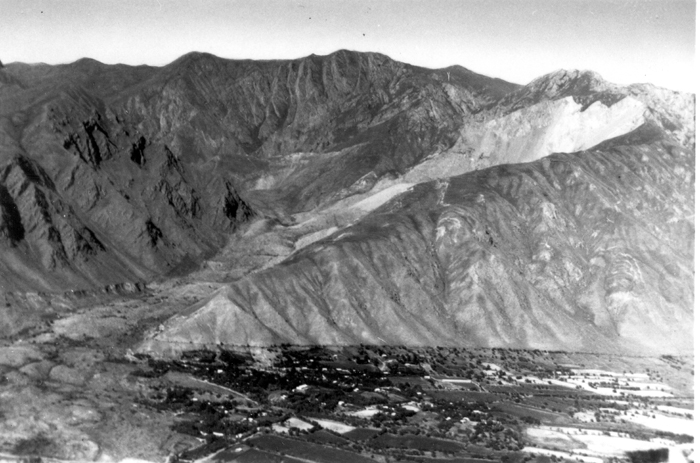
View of the Khait landslide showing the scar on Chokrak mountain and the landslide that overwhelmed the village of Khait

=== Earthquake ===
The main shock was preceded by two foreshocks (M5.1 and M5.6) on 8 July, just 12 minutes apart. The main shock had a magnitude of 7.4 calculated as the 'unified magnitude' using the 'Soviet Method'. The magnitude was recalculated as 7.5 on the moment magnitude scale in the ISC-GEM catalogue published in 2013.

=== Landslides ===
Most of the landslides triggered by the earthquake were loess flowslides, involving failure and flow of unconsolidated loess material. In the Yasman River valley, which lies almost entirely within the area of greatest felt intensity, a large number of such flowslides coalesced in tributary valleys before combining into one massive flowslide that travelled the length of the valley. The area covered by the Yasman valley slide is about 24.4 km^{2}, with a total estimated volume of 245 MCM (million cubic metres). The Khait landslide began as a rockslide but progressively entrained loess material. The rockslide was initiated by failure of part of the western flank of Chokrak Mountain. The landslide became more mobile once it began to entrain loess material and reached the Obi-Kabud River where it traversed the floodplain and surmounted a 25 m high river terrace on the river's west bank. The estimated volume for this landslide is about 75 MCM. It travelled with an estimated velocity of about 40 m/s.

== See also ==
- List of earthquakes in 1949
- List of earthquakes in Tajikistan
