= List of earthquakes in 1949 =

Earthquakes in 1949
Approximate epicenters of the earthquakes in 1949
- 4.0–5.9 magnitude
- 6.0–6.9 magnitude
- 7.0–7.9 magnitude
- 8.0+ magnitude
- Strongest: Canada, western Haida Gwaii (Magnitude 8.0) August 22
- Deadliest: Tajik Soviet Socialist Republic, Districts of Republican Subordination (Magnitude 7.5) July 10 12,000 deaths
- Total fatalities: 18,484

Number by magnitude
- 9.0+: 0

This is a list of earthquakes in 1949. Only magnitude 6.0 or greater earthquakes appear on the list. Lower magnitude events are included if they have caused death, injury or damage. Events which occurred in remote areas will be excluded from the list as they wouldn't have generated significant media interest. All dates are listed according to UTC time. Three events took up the vast majority of the deaths for 1949. The events happened during a volatile mid year period seismically speaking. Firstly in Tajikistan in July 12,000 were killed. A few weeks later in early August a quake struck Ecuador leaving 6,000 dead. In mid August Turkey suffered from an earthquake leaving another 320 dead. Also in this part of the year was the largest quake, a magnitude 8.0 in Canada.

== Overall ==
=== By death toll ===
Rank	Death toll	Magnitude	Location	MMI	Depth (km)	Date
1	12,000	7.5	Tajik Soviet Socialist Republic, Districts of Republican Subordination	X (Extreme)	20.0	July 10
2	6,000	6.5	Ecuador, Tungurahua Province	( )	15.0	August 5
3	320	6.8	Turkey, Bingol Province	( )	15.0	August 17
4	57	6.9	Chile, Araucania Region	VII (Very strong)	57.7	April 20
5	51	5.5	China, Sichuan Province	( )	0.0	November 13
6	21	7.3	China, southern Xinjiang Province	IX (Violent)	10.0	February 23
7	16	7.1	Philippines, Luzon	VIII (Severe)	15.0	December 29

- Note: At least 10 casualties

=== By magnitude ===
Rank	Magnitude	Death toll	Location	MMI	Depth (km)	Date
1	8.0	0	Canada, western Haida Gwaii	VIII (Severe)	10.0	August 22
2	7.7	1	Chile, Magallanes y la Antártica Chilena Region	VIII (Severe)	10.0	December 17
= 3	7.5	0	Afghanistan, Badakhshan Province	VIII (Severe)	228.7	March 4
= 3	7.5	12,000	Tajik Soviet Socialist Republic, Districts of Republican Subordination	X (Extreme)	20.0	July 10
= 3	7.5	0	Tonga	( )	75.1	August 6
4	7.4	0	Philippines, Mindanao	( )	127.0	April 30
= 5	7.3	21	China, southern Xinjiang Province	IX (Violent)	10.0	February 23
= 5	7.3	0	Chile, Tarapaca Region	( )	101.1	April 25
= 5	7.3	0	New Zealand, Kermadec Islands	( )	205.0	November 22
= 5	7.3	3	Chile, Magallanes y la Antártica Chilena Region	VIII (Severe)	10.0	December 17
= 6	7.2	0	New Hebrides	( )	145.0	July 23
= 6	7.2	0	Australia, west of Bougainville Island, New Guinea	( )	90.0	October 19
= 7	7.1	0	United States, Northern Mariana Islands	( )	15.0	July 2
= 7	7.1	16	Philippines, Luzon	VIII (Severe)	15.0	December 29
= 8	7.0	0	Fiji	( )	104.1	January 24
= 8	7.0	0	Indonesia, north of Halmahera	VII (Very strong)	60.0	March 27

- Note: At least 7.0 magnitude

== Notable events ==
=== January ===
January
- Strongest: 7.0 M_{w} Fiji
- Total fatalities: 0

Number by magnitude
- 8.0–8.9: 0
- 7.0–7.9: 1
- 6.0–6.9: 4

Date	Country and location	M_{w}	Depth (km)	MMI	Notes	Casualties	
Date	Country and location	M_{w}	Depth (km)	MMI	Notes	Dead	Injured
19	Taiwan, off the east coast	6.5	0.0		Depth unknown.		
20	Japan, Sea of Japan	6.5	0.0		Depth unknown.		
24	Fiji	7.0	104.1				
27	Australia, north of New Ireland (island), New Guinea	6.5	0.0		Unknown depth.		
27	Australia, north of New Ireland (island), New Guinea	6.0	0.0		Aftershock. Unknown depth.		

=== February ===
February
- Strongest: 7.3 M_{w} China
- Deadliest: 7.3 M_{w} China; 21 deaths
- Total fatalities: 21

Number by magnitude
- 8.0–8.9: 0
- 7.0–7.9: 1
- 6.0–6.9: 5

Date	Country and location	M_{w}	Depth (km)	MMI	Notes	Casualties	
Date	Country and location	M_{w}	Depth (km)	MMI	Notes	Dead	Injured
2	United States, Andreanof Islands, Alaska	6.8	220.0				
9	New Zealand, Cook Strait	6.2	170.0				
10	New Zealand, Samoa	6.8	0.0		Depth unknown.		
13	New Zealand, south of the Kermadec Islands	6.7	15.0				
14	Mexico, off the coast of Michoacan	6.5	0.0		Depth unknown.		
23	China, southern Xinjiang Province	7.3	10.0	IX	21 people were killed and 17 were injured. 1,010 homes were destroyed.	21	17

=== March ===
March
- Strongest: 7.5 M_{w} Afghanistan
- Total fatalities: 0

Number by magnitude
- 8.0–8.9: 0
- 7.0–7.9: 2
- 6.0–6.9: 3

Date	Country and location	M_{w}	Depth (km)	MMI	Notes	Casualties	
Date	Country and location	M_{w}	Depth (km)	MMI	Notes	Dead	Injured
4	Afghanistan, Badakhshan Province	7.5	228.7	VIII	Some damage was caused.		
16	Australia, East New Britain Province, New Guinea	6.6	35.0	rowspan="2"| Doublet earthquake.			
17	Australia, East New Britain Province, New Guinea	6.5	55.0	VI			
24	United States, off the coast of northern California	6.5	15.0				
27	Indonesia, north of Halmahera	7.0	60.0	VII			

=== April ===
April
- Strongest: 7.4 M_{w} Philippines
- Deadliest: 6.9 M_{w} Chile; 57 deaths
- Total fatalities: 65

Number by magnitude
- 8.0–8.9: 0
- 7.0–7.9: 2
- 6.0–6.9: 7

Date	Country and location	M_{w}	Depth (km)	MMI	Notes	Casualties	
Date	Country and location	M_{w}	Depth (km)	MMI	Notes	Dead	Injured
5	Japan, Sea of Japan	6.7	574.5				
13	United States, southern Puget Sound, Washington (state)	6.8	70.0	VIII	8 people were killed in the 1949 Olympia earthquake. Property damage costs were around $25 million (1949 rate).	8	
18	New Zealand, Samoa	6.8	60.0				
19	Russian Soviet Federative Socialist Republic, Kuril Islands, Russia	6.5	0.0		Depth unknown.		
20	Chile, Araucania Region	6.9	57.7	VII	57 people were killed and some damage was caused.	57	
23	Indonesia, Flores Sea	6.4	20.0	V			
24	Iran, Hormozgan Province	6.3	100.0		Major damage was caused.		
25	Chile, Tarapaca Region	7.3	101.1				
30	Philippines, Mindanao	7.4	127.0				

=== May ===
May
- Strongest: 6.8 M_{w} 2 events
- Total fatalities: 0

Number by magnitude
- 8.0–8.9: 0
- 7.0–7.9: 0
- 6.0–6.9: 7

Date	Country and location	M_{w}	Depth (km)	MMI	Notes	Casualties	
Date	Country and location	M_{w}	Depth (km)	MMI	Notes	Dead	Injured
3	Russian Soviet Federative Socialist Republic, Kuril Islands, Russia	6.8	138.8				
8	Chile, Tarapaca Region	6.6	119.3				
9	Indonesia, northern Sumatra	6.5	50.0	VI			
21	Japan, off the east coast of Honshu	6.2	40.0				
23	New Zealand, Kermadec Islands	6.5	160.0				
24	Mexico, Michoacan	6.5	100.0				
30	Bolivia, Potosi Department	6.8	97.7				

=== June ===
June
- Strongest: 6.9 M_{w} Argentina, 2 events
- Total fatalities: 0

Number by magnitude
- 8.0–8.9: 0
- 7.0–7.9: 0
- 6.0–6.9: 5

Date	Country and location	M_{w}	Depth (km)	MMI	Notes	Casualties	
Date	Country and location	M_{w}	Depth (km)	MMI	Notes	Dead	Injured
12	Argentina, Santiago del Estero Province	6.9	596.6	rowspan="2"| Doublet earthquake.			
12	Argentina, Santiago del Estero Province	6.9	585.0				
23	New Hebrides	6.6	180.7				
24	Indonesia, Sunda Strait	6.3	60.0	VI			
26	Indonesia, Molucca Sea	6.5	0.0				

=== July ===
July
- Strongest: 7.5 M_{w} Tajik Soviet Socialist Republic
- Deadliest: 7.5 M_{w} Tajik Soviet Socialist Republic; 12,000 deaths
- Total fatalities: 12,007

Number by magnitude
- 8.0–8.9: 0
- 7.0–7.9: 3
- 6.0–6.9: 7

Date	Country and location	M_{w}	Depth (km)	MMI	Notes	Casualties	
Date	Country and location	M_{w}	Depth (km)	MMI	Notes	Dead	Injured
2	United States, Northern Mariana Islands	7.1	15.0				
8	Guatemala, Lake Atitlan	6.0	100.0				
10	Tajik Soviet Socialist Republic, Districts of Republican Subordination	7.5	20.0	X	The 1949 Khait earthquake caused a series of large landslides. The estimated death toll was around 12,000. Major destruction was caused in the area. Many homes were destroyed. Large aftershocks followed.	12,000	
10	Tajik Soviet Socialist Republic, Districts of Republican Subordination	6.7	20.0	VII	Aftershock.		
10	Tajik Soviet Socialist Republic, Districts of Republican Subordination	6.9	20.0	VII	Aftershock.		
21	Peru, Arequipa Region	6.5	65.0				
23	New Hebrides	7.2	145.0				
23	Turkey, off the coast of İzmir Province	6.5	15.0	VII	7 people were killed and 435 were injured. 534 homes were destroyed. Another 5,501 were damaged.	7	435
25	United States, Northern Mariana Islands	6.6	210.0				
27	New Zealand, Kermadec Islands	6.5	25.0				

=== August ===
August
- Strongest: 8.0 M_{w} Canada
- Deadliest: 6.5 M_{w} Ecuador; 6,000 deaths
- Total fatalities: 6,320

Number by magnitude
- 8.0–8.9: 1
- 7.0–7.9: 1
- 6.0–6.9: 6

Date	Country and location	M_{w}	Depth (km)	MMI	Notes	Casualties	
Date	Country and location	M_{w}	Depth (km)	MMI	Notes	Dead	Injured
5	Ecuador, Tungurahua Province	6.5	15.0	VII	6,000 people were killed in the 1949 Ambato earthquake. Damage costs were $7.5 million (1949 rate).	6,000	
6	Tonga	7.5	75.1				
17	Japan, southeast of Hokkaido	6.5	96.0				
17	Turkey, Bingol Province	6.8	15.0	X	The 1949 Karliova earthquake resulted in 320 deaths and major property damage.	320	
18	Panama, Chiriqui Province	6.5	0.0		Unknown depth.		
22	Canada, western Haida Gwaii	8.0	10.0	VIII	The 1949 Queen Charlotte Islands earthquake was one of the largest in Canadian history.		
23	Canada, central Haida Gwaii	6.3	10.0		Aftershock.		
25	United States, Andreanof Islands, Alaska	6.8	0.0		Unknown depth.		

=== September ===
September
- Strongest: 6.9 M_{w} Indonesia
- Total fatalities: 0

Number by magnitude
- 8.0–8.9: 0
- 7.0–7.9: 0
- 6.0–6.9: 5

Date	Country and location	M_{w}	Depth (km)	MMI	Notes	Casualties	
Date	Country and location	M_{w}	Depth (km)	MMI	Notes	Dead	Injured
5	Philippines, northern Luzon	6.4	80.0				
14	Indonesia, Molucca Sea	6.9	15.0				
25	Australia, southwest of Bougainville Island, Papua and New Guinea	6.5	0.0		Unknown depth.		
27	United States, Kenai Peninsula, Alaska	6.7	50.0	VII			
30	Fiji, south of	6.5	0.0		Unknown depth.		

=== October ===
October
- Strongest: 7.2 M_{w} Australia
- Total fatalities: 0

Number by magnitude
- 8.0–8.9: 0
- 7.0–7.9: 1
- 6.0–6.9: 4

Date	Country and location	M_{w}	Depth (km)	MMI	Notes	Casualties	
Date	Country and location	M_{w}	Depth (km)	MMI	Notes	Dead	Injured
1	Belgian Congo, Katanga Province	6.0	35.0				
19	Australia, west of Bougainville Island, Papua and New Guinea	7.2	90.0				
20	Australia, southeast of New Ireland (island), Papua and New Guinea	6.5	96.0		Aftershock.		
31	United States, southeast coast of Alaska	6.3	0.0		Depth unknown.		
31	Australia, southeast of New Ireland (island), Papua and New Guinea	6.6	87.4		Aftershock.		

=== November ===
November
- Strongest: 7.3 M_{w} New Zealand
- Deadliest: 5.5 M_{w} China; 51+ deaths
- Total fatalities: 51+

Number by magnitude
- 8.0–8.9: 0
- 7.0–7.9: 1
- 6.0–6.9: 4
- 5.0–5.9: 1

Date	Country and location	M_{w}	Depth (km)	MMI	Notes	Casualties	
Date	Country and location	M_{w}	Depth (km)	MMI	Notes	Dead	Injured
3	Russian Soviet Federative Socialist Republic, Kuril Islands, Russia	6.8	145.0				
7	New Hebrides	6.6	35.0	V			
13	China, Sichuan Province	5.5	0.0		At least 51 people were killed and some damage was caused. Depth unknown.	51+	
17	United States, Terminal Island, California	0.0	0.0		Damage to oil wells was reported costing $9 million (1949 rate). Magnitude and depth unknown.		
20	Mexico, Gulf of California	6.8	10.0	VI			
22	New Zealand, Kermadec Islands	7.3	205.0				
27	Tonga	6.6	15.0				

=== December ===
December
- Strongest: 7.7 M_{w} Chile
- Deadliest: 7.1 M_{w} Philippines; 16 deaths
- Total fatalities: 20

Number by magnitude
- 8.0–8.9: 0
- 7.0–7.9: 3
- 6.0–6.9: 8

Date	Country and location	M_{w}	Depth (km)	MMI	Notes	Casualties	
Date	Country and location	M_{w}	Depth (km)	MMI	Notes	Dead	Injured
17	Chile, Magallanes y la Antartica Chilena Region	7.7	10.0	VIII	The 1949 Tierra del Fuego earthquakes was unusually large for this area. 1 person was killed and some damage was caused.	1	
17	Chile, Magallanes y la Antartica Chilena Region	7.3	10.0	VIII	A large aftershock of the earlier event. 3 further fatalities were caused as well as further damage.	3	
18	New Zealand, Kermadec Islands	6.8	185.0				
21	Bolivia, Chuquisaca Department	6.8	611.3				
22	Mexico, Chiapas	6.5	65.0				
25	Mexico, off the coast of Colima	6.0	0.0		Unknown depth.		
25	Japan, Totigi Prefecture, Honshu	6.3	10.0	rowspan="2"| Doublet earthquake.			
25	Japan, Totigi Prefecture, Honshu	6.3	10.0	VII			
26	Fiji	6.9	15.0	VII			
29	Philippines, Luzon	7.1	15.0	VIII	16 people were killed mainly due to boats sinking. A tsunami was reported. Some homes were damaged or destroyed.	16	
29	Fiji	6.5	160.0				
