= Qal'ai Surkh =

Kalai Surkh
- Village and Jamoat
- Location within Tajikistan
- Coordinates: 38°59′N 70°17′E
- Country: Tajikistan
- Region: Districts of Republican Subordination
- District: Rasht District

Population (2015)
  - Total: 15,711
- Time zone: UTC+5 (TJT)

Kalai Surkh (Tajik: Қалъаи Сурх Qal'ai Surkh, Persian: قلعه سرخ) is a village and jamoat in Tajikistan. It is located in Rasht District, one of the Districts of Republican Subordination. The jamoat has a total population of 15,711 (2015). It consists of 21 villages, including Kalai Surkh (the seat) and Navdonak.
