= 1949 Karlıova earthquake =

Earthquake in Turkey

- Location within Turkey
- UTC time: 1949-08-17 18:44:17
- ISC event: 896772
- USGS-ANSS: ComCat
- Local date: 17 August 1949
- Local time: 20:44:17
- Magnitude: 7.1 M_{w} 6.7 M_{s}
- Epicenter: 39.0°N 40.5°E
- Fault: North Anatolian Fault
- Type: Strike-slip
- Areas affected: Turkey, Karlıova
- Max. intensity: MMI X (Extreme)
- Casualties: 320–450

Map of Anatolian plate showing main tectonic boundaries

The 1949 Karlıova earthquake occurred at 18:44 UTC on 17 August with an epicenter near Karlıova in Bingöl Province, Eastern Anatolia region of Turkey. It had an estimated magnitude of 6.7, a maximum felt intensity of X (Extreme) on the Mercalli intensity scale, and caused 320–450 casualties and destroyed 3,500 buildings.

== Tectonic setting ==
The Karlıova region is the location of the triple junction between the boundaries of the Eurasian plate, Anatolian plate and the Arabian plate, the North Anatolian Fault, East Anatolian Fault and the Mus fold and thrust belt, which passes to the east into the Zagros fold and thrust belt. The earthquake occurred at the eastern end of the North Anatolian Fault.

== Characteristics ==
The seismic moment estimated for this earthquake is 3.5E+26, equivalent to a magnitude of 7.1 on the moment magnitude scale. The estimated fault length involved is 63 km.

The earthquake ruptured the easternmost part of the Yedisu segment (FS3, also known as the Elamalı segment) and most of the Ilıpınar segment (FS2 & FS1), although it remains unclear whether the rupture continued as far as Karlıova itself.

== See also ==
- List of earthquakes in 1949
- List of earthquakes in Turkey
