= Askalon, Tajikistan =

Askalon Russian: Аскалон Tajik: Аскалон
- Village and Jamoat
- Location within Tajikistan
- Coordinates: 39°02′N 70°26′E
- Country: Tajikistan
- Region: Districts of Republican Subordination
- District: Rasht District

Population (2015)
  - Total: 4,114
- Time zone: UTC+5 (TJT)
- Official languages: Russian (Interethnic); Tajik (State)

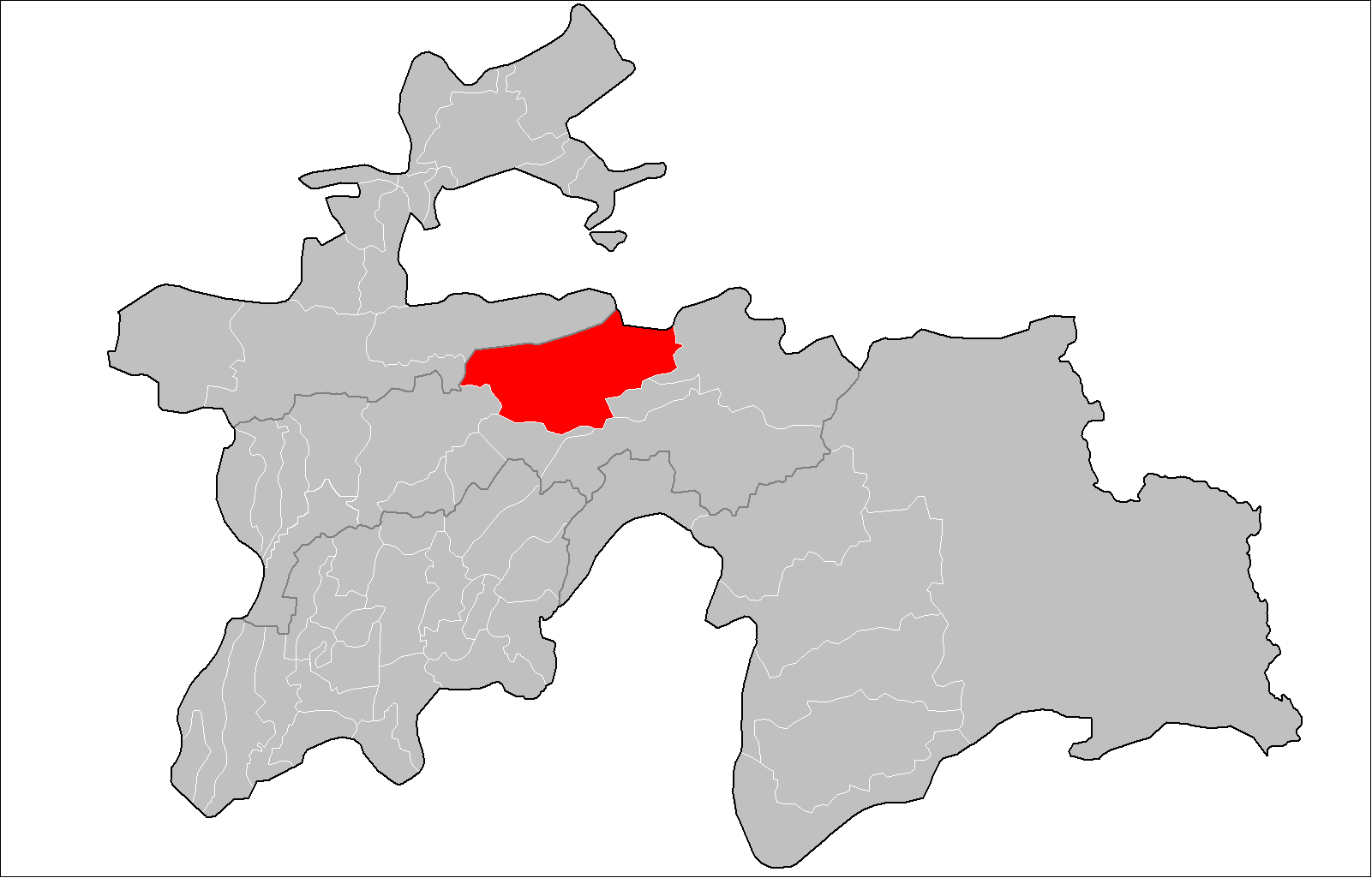
Rasht District in Tajikistan

Askalon (Tajik: Аскалон, Persian: اَسکَلان) is a village and jamoat in Tajikistan. It is located in Rasht District, one of the Districts of Republican Subordination. The jamoat has a total population of 4,114 (2015).
