= Karategin Uzbeks =

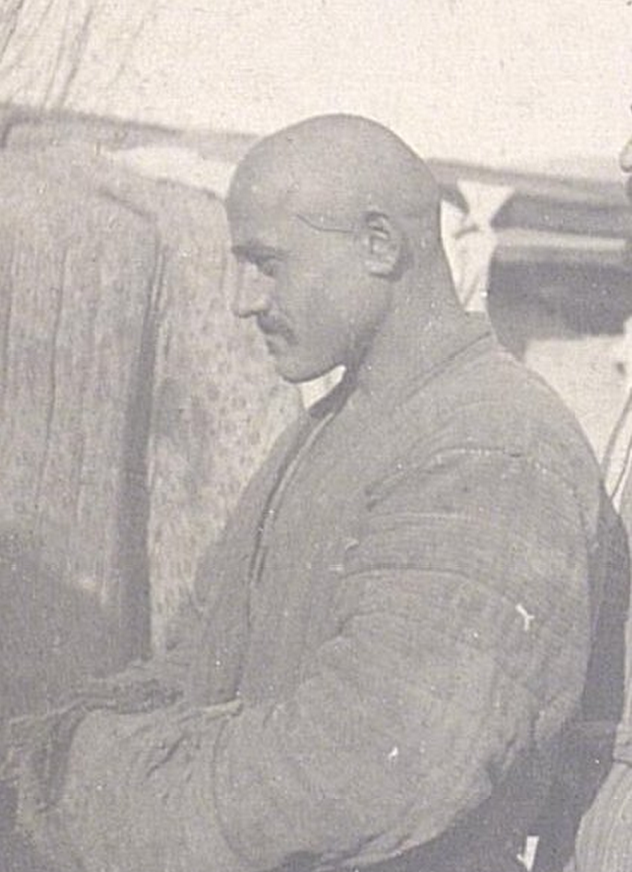

Total population
- >100.000

Regions with significant populations
- Afghanistan

Languages
- Southern Uzbek

Religion
- Sunni Islam

Related ethnic groups
- Turkic peoples

The Karategin Uzbeks (formerly known as Dormon Uzbeks) are a Karluk-Turkic ethnic group, indigenous to Karategin, Tajikistan, but now living in the regions between Balkh and Kabul, in North Afghanistan. In the 16th century they were expelled by the Kyrgyz to their present homeland.

== Name ==
The name Karategin derives from the historical region of Karategin, in Tajikistan. Before the Kyrgyz had expanded to the southern regions of Fergana, Kulob and Balkh, the Karategin Uzbeks (formerly known as Dormon Uzbeks) used to live there.

== Sources ==
- Bukinich Dmitry, N. I. Vavilov's expedition to Afghanistan (1924), . [The Institute of Applied Botany (Leningrad) sent an expedition to Afghanistan in 1924, consisting of the director of the Institute, Prof. N. I. Vavilov, the engineer-agronomist, D. D. Bukinich, and the agronomist, V. N. Lebedev. During this period, the Karategin Uzbeks were recorded in the context of Anthropological fieldwork for the first time.]
- Кыргыздардын жана Кыргызстандын тарыхый булактары. II т. Бишкек [Historical sources of the Kyrgyz and Kyrgyzstan. Vol. 2, Bishkek], 2003. – pp. 221–238-б.
