= Nusratullo Makhsum, Tajikistan =

Nusratullo Makhsum
- Jamoat
- Location within Tajikistan
- Coordinates: 39°01′N 70°16′E
- Country: Tajikistan
- Region: Districts of Republican Subordination
- District: Rasht District

Population (2015)
  - Total: 13,762
- Time zone: UTC+5 (TJT)
- Official languages: Russian (Interethnic); Tajik (State) (Note: Constitution of Tajikistan)

Nusratullo Makhsum (Russian and Tajik: Нусратулло Махсум, formerly: Kaznok) is a jamoat in Tajikistan. It is located in Rasht District, one of the Districts of Republican Subordination. The jamoat has a total population of 13,762 (2015).
