= Navdi =

- Village and Jamoat
- Location within Tajikistan
- Coordinates: 39°03′N 70°24′E
- Country: Tajikistan
- Region: Districts of Republican Subordination
- District: Rasht District

Population (2015)
  - Total: 15,425
- Time zone: UTC+5 (TJT)

Navdi (Tajik: Навдӣ, Persian: نوده) is a village and jamoat in Tajikistan. It is located in Rasht District, one of the Districts of Republican Subordination. The jamoat has a total population of 15,425 (2015).
