= Tagoba =

- Village and Jamoat
- Location within Tajikistan
- Coordinates: 39°01′N 70°05′E
- Country: Tajikistan
- Region: Districts of Republican Subordination
- District: Rasht District

Population (2015)
  - Total: 5,890
- Time zone: UTC+5 (TJT)
- Official languages: Russian (Interethnic); Tajik (State)

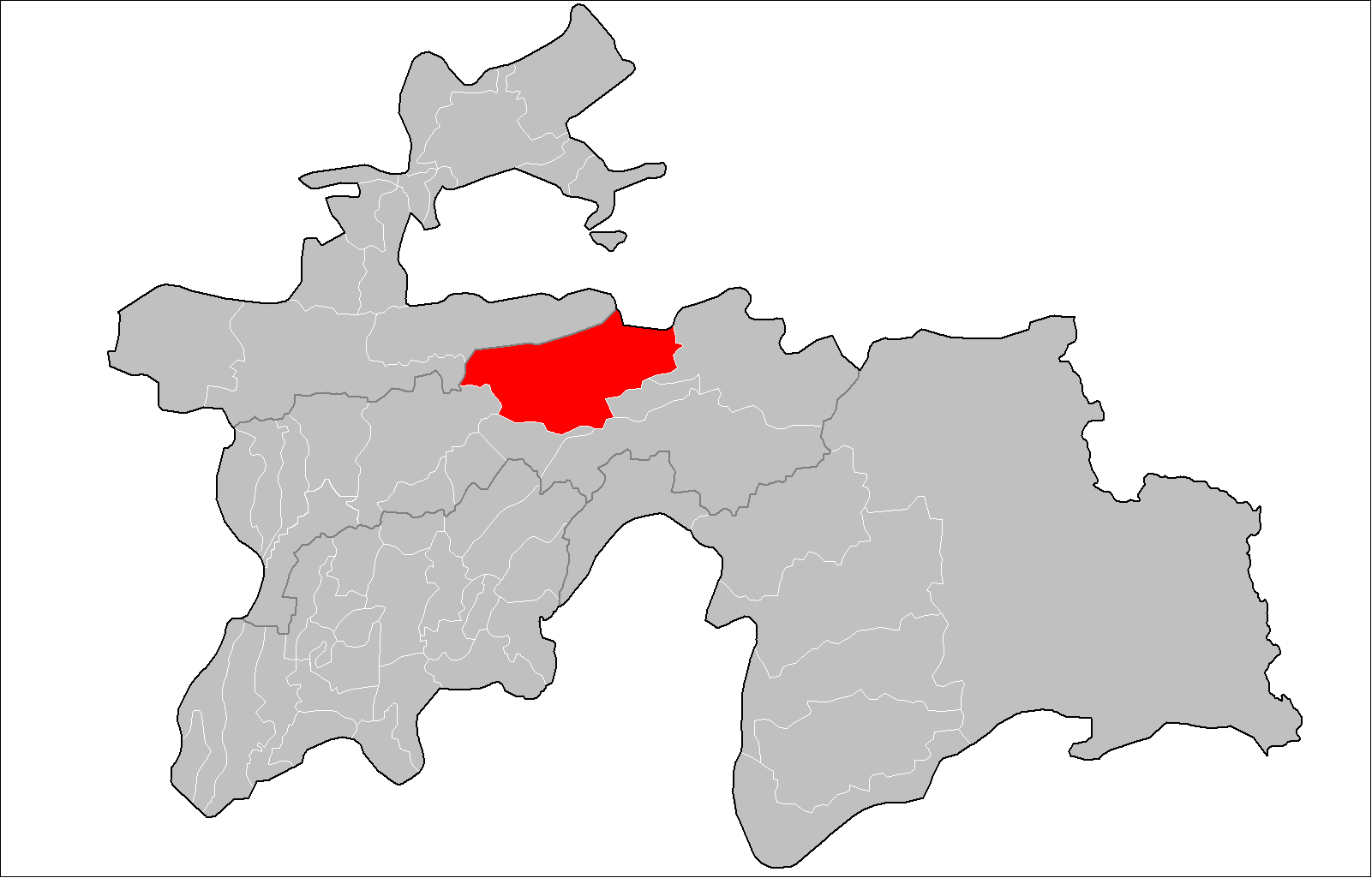
Location of Rasht District in Tajikistan

Tagoba (Russian: Тагоба; Tajik: Тагоба/تَگابه) is a village and jamoat in Tajikistan. It is located in Rasht District, one of the Districts of Republican Subordination. The jamoat has a total population of 5,890 (2015).
