= Khait landslide =

1949 landslide in Tajikistan

Coordinates: 39°10′44″N 70°52′08″E

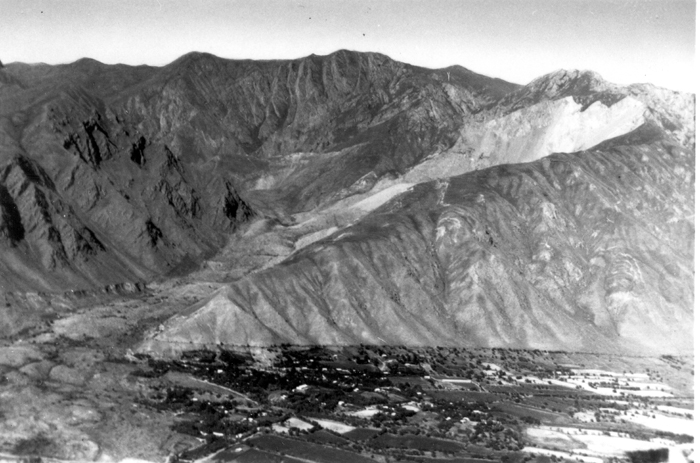
View of the Khait landslide showing the scar on Chokrak mountain and the landslide that overwhelmed the village of Khait

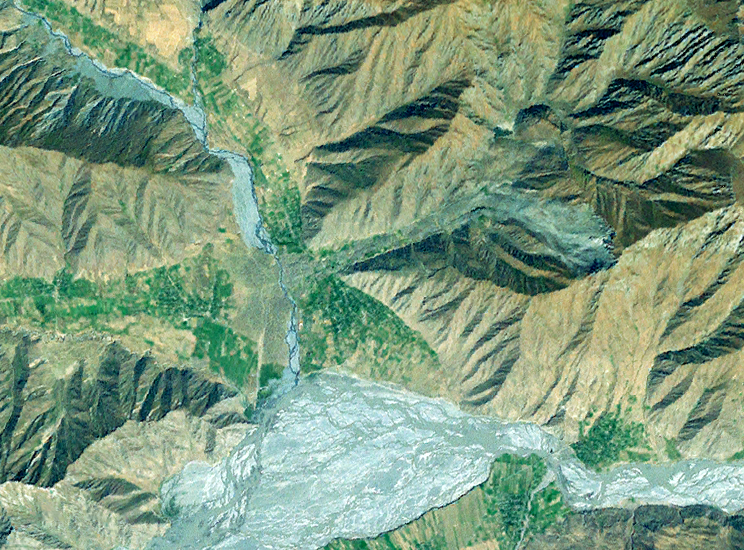
Landsat image of the landslide

The Khait or Hoit landslide occurred on July 10, 1949, in the Hoit district in the Gharm Oblast in the Tajik Soviet Socialist Republic, then part of the Soviet Union. 'Khait' is a transliteration from Russian: Хаит; the local modern spelling is Hoit (Tajik: Ҳоит).

The landslide was triggered by the 1949 Khait earthquake and buried 33 villages and has by some estimates killed 28,000 people. News of the landslide was not publicly revealed by the government and details of the disaster were not revealed until after the fall of the Soviet Union. A marble statue of a woman with her head and hands lowered and an expression of grief was later erected at the site.

== Earthquake ==
The earthquake occurred at 09:45 local time on 10 July 1949. It had an estimated magnitude of M_{w} 7.5. It triggered hundreds of landslides throughout the epicentral area. Most of the landslides occurred along the sides of the Yasman River valley, a tributary of the Surkhob River, caused by the failure of unconsolidated loess deposits. The largest single failure was the Khait landslide.

== The Khait landslide ==
This landslide began with the failure of a large mass of rock high on the western flank of Chokrak Mountain above the village of Khait. The rock mass began to travel to the northwest as a rockslide into the Obi-Khaus-Dara valley. Much of the debris flow material was deposited before the slide reached the valley bottom, but the frontal part of the slide began increasingly to incorporate loess material and to accelerate. This flow continued down the valley floor for more than another 4,000 m, despite the relatively low slope (3.6°). The flow broadened as it reached the main Obi-Kabud River valley, sweeping through part of Khait, crossing the river, before climbing a 25 m high terrace on the river's western bank and continuing a further 700 m, overwhelming the village of Khisorak.

The volume of the initial rockfall has been estimated as 54 million cubic metres (MCM), expanding to about 65 MCM as it broke up. The final volume of the landslide is estimated to be about 75 MCM, consistent with a volume of 10 MCM of loess material becoming entrained.

The total distance travelled by the flowslide is 7.4 km. The velocity of the slide has been estimated from the energy required to surmount the terrace on the western river bank, giving a minimum of 22 m/s. This compares with the reported delay of 3 to 4 minutes between the earthquake and the destruction of Khit, which suggests an overall velocity of 26 m/s.

== Casualties ==
Published estimates for the death toll from the earthquake vary greatly between 5,000 and more than 29,000. There are no official contemporary records as information about major disasters was suppressed during Stalin's leadership. It is also unclear whether these figures refer to all those killed as a result of the earthquake, or only those caused by the Khait landslide. Estimates based on likely population densities in the two settlements that suffered the most damage, Khait and Khisorak, suggest that only about 800 people are likely to have died directly as a result of the landslide.
