= Hijborak =

Village in Rasht district, Tajikistan

- Village and Jamoat
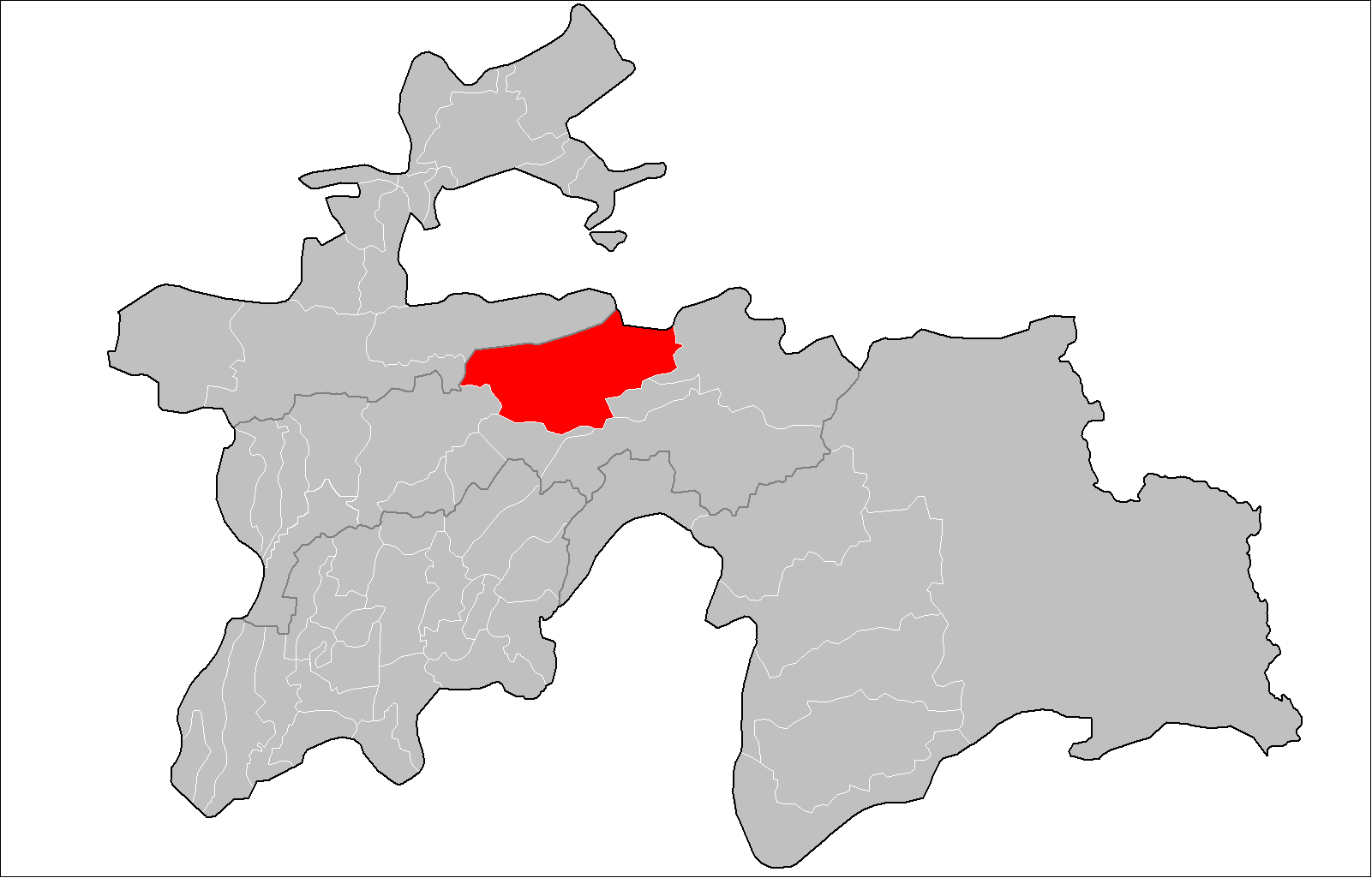
- Rasht district in Tajikistan

- Location within Tajikistan
- Coordinates: 39°04′N 70°33′E
- Country: Tajikistan
- Region: Districts of Republican Subordination
- District: Rasht District

Population (2015)
  - Total: 5,609
- Time zone: UTC+5 (TJT)

Hijborak (Tajik: Ҳиҷборак, Persian: هیجبارَک) is a village and jamoat in Tajikistan. It is located in Rasht District, one of the Districts of Republican Subordination. The jamoat has a total population of 5,609 (2015).
