= Obi Mehnat =

- Village and Jamoat
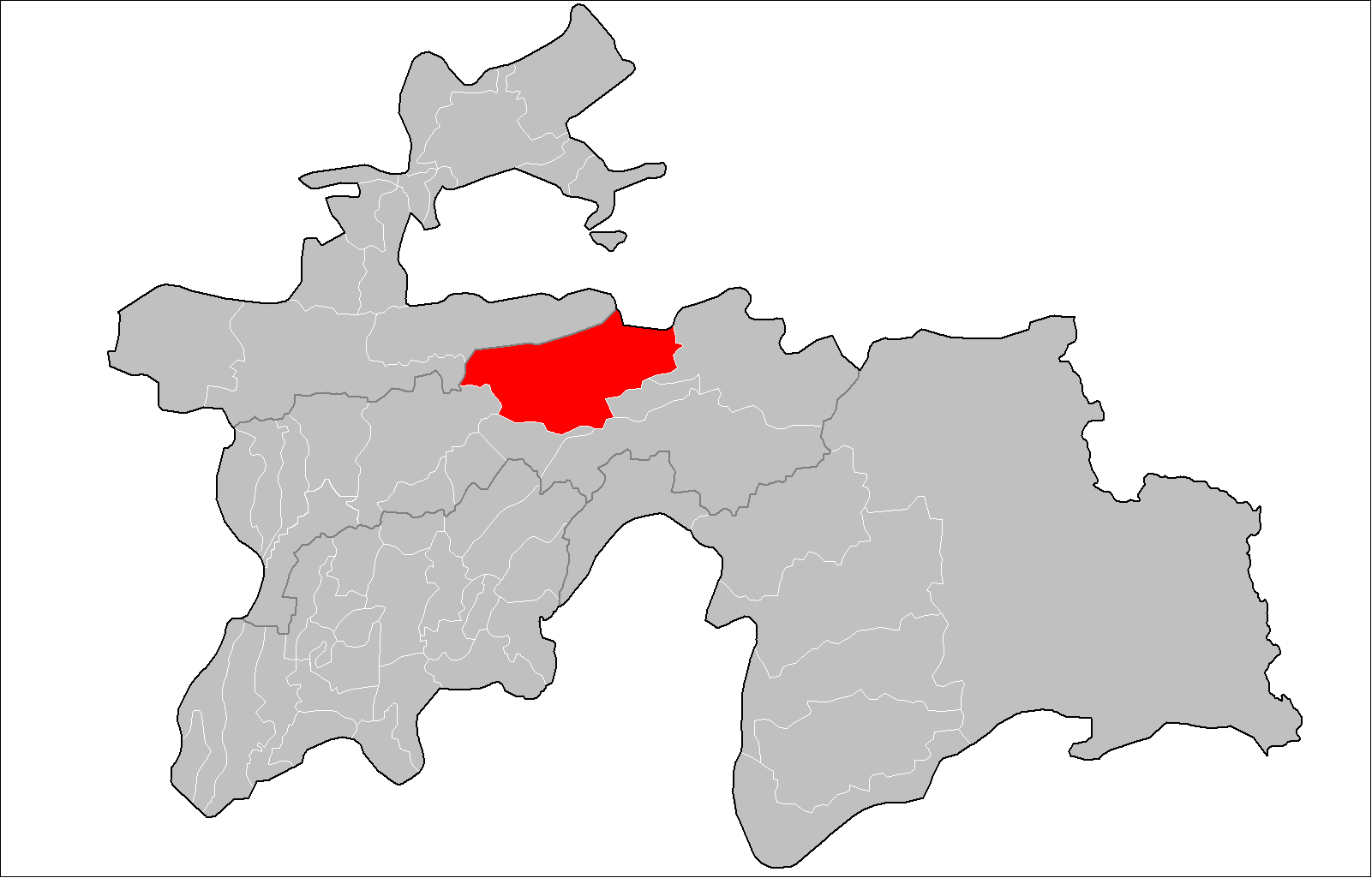
- Rasht District, Tajikistan
- Country: Tajikistan
- Region: Districts of Republican Subordination
- District: Rasht District

Population (2015)
  - Total: 2,304
- Time zone: UTC+5 (TJT)
- Official languages: Russian (Interethnic); Tajik (State) (Note: Constitution of Tajikistan)

Obi Mehnat (Russian: Оби Мехнат; Tajik: Оби Меҳнат, Persian: آب محنت) is a village and jamoat in Tajikistan. It is located in Rasht District, one of the Districts of Republican Subordination. The jamoat has a total population of 2,304 (2015).
