= Jafr =

- Village and Jamoat
- Location within Tajikistan
- Coordinates: 39°06′N 70°35′E
- Country: Tajikistan
- Region: Districts of Republican Subordination
- District: Rasht District

Population (2015)
  - Total: 7,245
- Time zone: UTC+5 (TJT)

Jafr (Tajik: Ҷафр, Persian: جَفر) is a village and jamoat in Tajikistan. It is located in Rasht District, one of the Districts of Republican Subordination. The jamoat has a total population of 7,245 (2015).
