= Kalanak, Tajikistan =

Kalanak
- Village and Jamoat
- Location within Tajikistan
- Coordinates: 39°05′N 70°30′E
- Country: Tajikistan
- Region: Districts of Republican Subordination
- District: Rasht District

Population (2015)
  - Total: 10,411
- Time zone: UTC+5 (TJT)

Kalanak (Tajik: Қалъанак Qal'anak, Persian: قلعه‌نَک) is a village and jamoat in Tajikistan. It is located in Rasht District, one of the Districts of Republican Subordination. The jamoat has a total population of 10,411 (2015). The village is on the northern, right bank of the river Surkhob. On the left bank of the river are the western foothills of the Peter I Range.

== History ==
During the 1920s the area was a hotbed for the Basmachi, the anti-Soviet resistance in Central Asia.

During the Civil War in Tajikistan from 1992 to 1997, the area was a hotbed for Islamist forces, and October 2010, the Tajik Interior Ministry asserted it had killed three militants nearby at Gharm amid an alleged rise in Islamic militancy in the region.
