= Gharmi Tajiks =

Ethnic group of Tajiks

Gharmis
Regions with significant populations
- Tajikistan

Languages
- Tajik, Russian

Religion
- Sunni Islam

Related ethnic groups
- Other Iranian peoples

The Gharmi Tajiks (Note: Russian: Гармские таджики; Tajik: Тоҷикони Ғарм, romanized: Tojikoni Gharm, IPA: [tʰɔdʒiˈkʰɔnɪ ˈʁaɾm]) are one of the original regional groups of Tajiks, with origins in the Rasht Valley in central Tajikistan.

== History ==
From the 1920s to 1955, there was a Gharm Oblast in Tajikistan, and henceforth people from central Tajikistan were known as Gharmi Tajiks. During the 1950s, many Gharmi Tajiks were forced to migrate by soviet government from central Tajikistan to the Vakhsh River Valley in western Tajikistan.

Gharmi Tajiks were largely excluded from government positions, which were dominated by individuals from Khujand. Gharmi Tajiks who settled in Qurghonteppa Oblast are frequently described as a clan group that found social niches in education and the marketplace.

After Tajikistan became independent in 1991, many Gharmi Tajiks participated in protests against communists and the government. When the Civil War of Tajikistan broke out in 1992 a large number of Gharmi Tajiks joined the DPT-IRP opposition. The organization Human Rights Watch among others, reported that Gharmi Tajiks were targeted for execution, disappearances, mass killings, and Gharmi villages were burnt.

During the fall and winter of 1992, as many as 90,000 Gharmi Tajiks were expelled from their homes and found refuge in Afghanistan in a campaign described by the United States Department of State as a pogrom. This was followed by heavy fighting in the Rasht Valley between government and opposition forces that led to the destruction of villages. There is evidence that rape was used by both sides during this campaign.
