= Gharm =

Place in Tajikistan

- Location in Tajikistan
- Coordinates: 39°01′N 70°23′E
- Country: Tajikistan
- Region: Districts of Republican Subordination
- District: Rasht District
- Elevation: 1,355 m (4,446 ft)

Population (2020)
  - Total: 9,800
- Time zone: UTC+5

Gharm (Note: Tajik: Ғарм, romanized: G‘arm, IPA: [ˈʁaɾm]; Russian: Гарм, romanized: Garm, IPA: [garm]) is a city and jamoat in the Rasht Valley area of central Tajikistan. The population of the town is 9,800 (January 2020 estimate).

From the 1920s until 1955, there was a Gharm Oblast in Tajikistan, which included the territory of the current Gharm Valley. Gharm is also the former name of the Rasht District in central Tajikistan.

== History ==
During the 1920s Gharm was a hotbed for the Basmachi, the anti-Soviet resistance in Central Asia. In 1929 Basmachi commander Faizal Maksum crossed from Afghanistan into Tajikistan and briefly captured Gharm, only to later be expelled by Soviet forces.

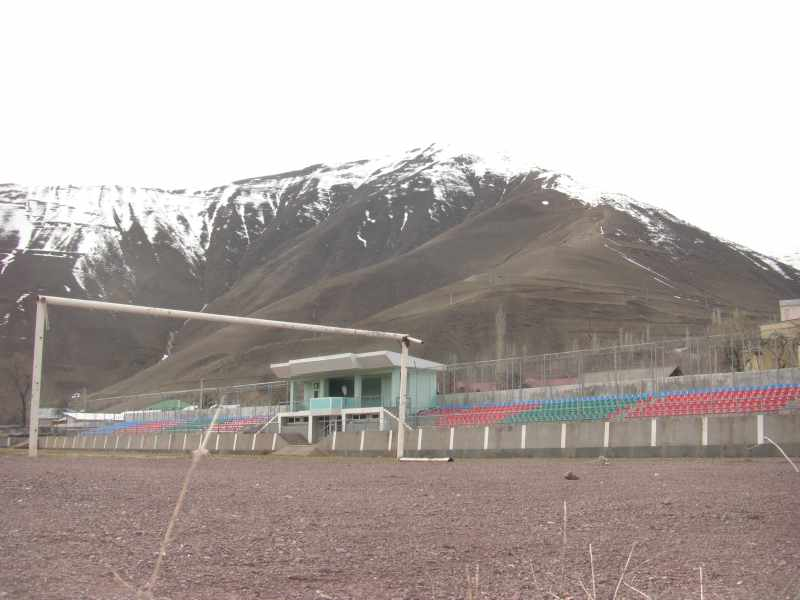
Gharm Stadium in the south of the town.

During the Civil War in Tajikistan from 1992 to 1997, Gharm was a hotbed for the opposition force, and the town was controlled by the opposition during the later part of the civil war in Tajikistan. In October 2010, the Tajik Interior Ministry asserted it had killed three militants on the outskirts of Gharm amid an alleged rise in Islamic militancy in the region.

== Climate ==
Climate data for Gharm
Month	Jan	Feb	Mar	Apr	May	Jun	Jul	Aug	Sep	Oct	Nov	Dec	Year
Mean daily maximum °C (°F)	0 (32)	1 (34)	6 (43)	13 (55)	12 (54)	16 (61)	18 (64)	18 (64)	19 (66)	14 (57)	9 (48)	3 (37)	11 (52)
Mean daily minimum °C (°F)	−4 (25)	−3 (27)	1 (34)	6 (43)	7 (45)	9 (48)	11 (52)	12 (54)	8 (46)	5 (41)	3 (37)	−1 (30)	5 (41)
Average precipitation mm (inches)	24 (0.9)	30 (1.2)	51 (2.0)	36 (1.4)	21 (0.8)	6 (0.2)	3 (0.1)	3 (0.1)	6 (0.2)	15 (0.6)	18 (0.7)	39 (1.5)	253 (10.0)
Average precipitation days	7	8	9	7	5	4	3	2	1	5	5	9	65
Source: World Weather Online
