= Hoit, Tajikistan =

Hoit
- Village and Jamoat
- Location within Tajikistan
- Coordinates: 39°11′N 70°53′E
- Country: Tajikistan
- Region: Districts of Republican Subordination
- District: Rasht District

Population (2015)
  - Total: 7,716
- Time zone: UTC+5 (TJT)

Hoit (Tajik: Ҳоит, Persian: حائط Ḥāʼeṭ, Russian: Хаит Khait) is a village and jamoat in Tajikistan. It is located in Rasht District, one of the Districts of Republican Subordination. The jamoat has a total population of 7,716 (2015). Hoit is situated near the confluences of the river Surkhob (Vakhsh) with its tributaries Yasman and Yarkhych.

== Earthquake catastrophe ==
On 10 July 1949 one of the three largest earthquakes of the 20th century, struck Tajikistan at Hoit. Twenty villages in the Yasman valley, Hoit and nearby Hisorak were covered with mud and debris. Estimates of the number of casualties range from 7,200 to 29,000.

According to the Global Seismic Hazard Map (GSHAP 1999), the whole country is located in the high to very high risk zone with a history of catastrophic and deadly earthquakes.
