= Yasman =

- Jamoat
- Location within Tajikistan
- Coordinates: 39°11′N 70°48′E
- Country: Tajikistan
- Region: Districts of Republican Subordination
- District: Rasht District
- Time zone: UTC+5 (TJT)
- Official languages: Russian (Interethnic); Tajik (State)

Yasman (Tajik: Ясман; Russian: Ясман) is a jamoat in Tajikistan. It is located in Rasht District, one of the Districts of Republican Subordination.
