= Gharm Oblast =

Defunct oblast of the Tajik Soviet Socialist Republic

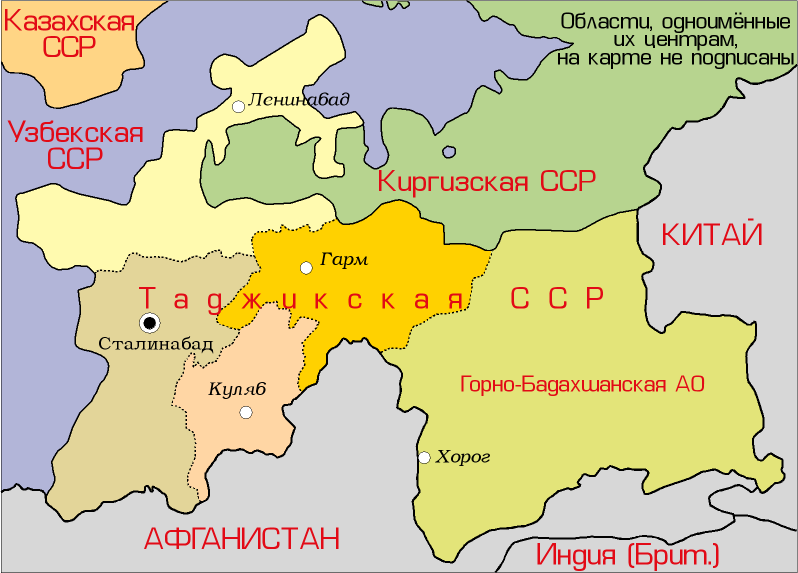
Gharm Oblast in yellow

The Gharm Oblast (Note: Russian: Гармская область; Tajik: вилояти Ғарм, romanized: vilojati Ƣarm) was an oblast in the Tajik Soviet Socialist Republic in the Soviet Union from the 1920s to 1955. Its capital was Gharm. The population of Gharm were known as Gharmis, a term still used in Tajikistan today.

== History ==
In the 1920s, during the reorganization of borders in Central Asia, a Gharm oblast was created out of the old Qarategin and Darvaz, districts of the Emirate of Bukhara. The Gharm Oblast consisted of much of the Qarategin Valley, as well as the Kalai-Khumb District. During the 1920s Gharm was a hotbed for the Basmachi, the anti-Soviet resistance in Central Asia. In 1929 Basmachi commander Faizal Maksum crossed from Afghanistan into Tajikistan and briefly captured the city Gharm, only to later be expelled by Soviet forces.

The 1939 Soviet Census record a population of 183,100 in the Gharm Oblast. During the 1950s much of the population of Gharm was forcibly relocated by the government to western Tajikistan (Vakhsh valley). This population of people is known today as the Gharmis. In 1955 the Garm oblast was abolished and the land was redistributed to the Gorno-Badakshan Autonomous Oblast and the Regions under Republican Subordination Oblast. The Gharmis continued to have a distinct clan identity in Tajikistan. During the Civil War in Tajikistan from 1992-1997 many Gharmis were targeted for massacres.
