= Faizal Maksum =

Faizal Maksum was one of the leaders of an anti-Soviet group known as the Basmachi and led an organized resistance against the Soviet military occupation of Central Asia in the 1920s. Maksum was loyal to the ousted Emir of Bukhara and operated primarily on the border of the Soviet republic of Tajikistan and Afghanistan.

== Military career ==
By late 1921, all the provinces of Western Bukhara were administered by the Basmachis Abdulkahhar and Faizul Makhdum. By July 1923, Maksum had a total of 3,000 men under his command.

=== 1929 insurgency ===
In 1929 Faizal Maksum led a raid from Afghanistan into Tajikistan during the short reign of the Afghan Emir Habibullāh Kalakāni. In this raid his forces briefly captured the town of Garm in central Tajikistan, until Soviet forces, supplied by air, expelled Basmachi forces from the town. After the final capture of the Darvoz District by the Bolsheviks, Faizal Maksum fled to the East Turkestan in China. In the mid-1930s, he was murdered by Soviet spies in Kashgar.
