= List of heads of government of Tajikistan =

Tajikistani government list

This is a list of heads of government of Tajikistan from the establishment of the office in 1923 to the present day.

== Tajik Autonomous Soviet Socialist Republic (1925–1929) ==
=== Chairmen of the Council of People's Commissars ===
- Nusratulla Maksum Lutfullayev (1925–1926)
- Polat Usmon Khodzhayev (December 1926 – 1928)
- Mumin Khodzhayev (March 1928 – December 1929)

== Tajik Soviet Socialist Republic (1929–1991) ==
=== Chairmen of the Council of People's Commissars ===
- Abdurrahim Hojibayev (December 1929 – 28 December 1933)
- Abdullo Rakhimbayev (28 December 1933 – February 1937)
- Urunboi Ashurov (February – September 1937)
- Mamdali Kurbanov (September 1937 – April 1946)

=== Chairmen of the Council of Ministers ===
- Dzhabar Rasulov (April 1946 – 29 March 1955)
- Tursun Uljabayev (29 March 1955 – 25 May 1956)
- Nazarsho Dodkhudoyev (25 May 1956 – 12 April 1961)
- Abdulakhad Kakharov (12 April 1961 – 24 July 1973)
- Rahmon Nabiyev (24 July 1973 – 20 April 1982)
- Qahhor Mahkamov (26 April 1982 – 26 January 1986)

== Republic of Tajikistan (1991–present) ==
No.	Portrait	Prime Minister	Took office	Left office	Time in office	Party
1	Izatullo Khayoyev	Izatullo Khayoyev (1936–2015)	25 June 1991	9 January 1992	198 days	Communist
2	Akbar Mirzoyev	Akbar Mirzoyev (born 1939)	9 January 1992	21 September 1992	256 days	Independent
3	Abdumalik Abdullajanov	Abdumalik Abdullajanov (born 1949)	21 September 1992	18 December 1993	1 year, 88 days	People's Unity
4	Abdujalil Samadov	Abdujalil Samadov (1949–2004)	18 December 1993	2 December 1994	349 days	Independent
5	Jamshed Karimov	Jamshed Karimov (born 1940)	2 December 1994	8 February 1996	1 year, 68 days	Independent
6	Yahyo Azimov	Yahyo Azimov (born 1947)	8 February 1996	20 December 1999	3 years, 315 days	Independent
7	Oqil Oqilov	Oqil Oqilov (born 1944)	20 December 1999	23 November 2013	13 years, 338 days	PDP
8	Qohir Rasulzoda	Qohir Rasulzoda (born 1961)	23 November 2013	Incumbent	12 years, 325 days	PDP

== See also ==
- Prime Minister of Tajikistan
- President of Tajikistan
- List of leaders of Tajikistan
