= List of ambassadors of Tajikistan to China =

Coordinates: 39.951348°N 116.465373°E

Ambassador of Tajikistan to China
- Incumbent; Zohir Ozod Saidzoda since April 14, 2021
- Inaugural holder: Jamshed Karimov
- Formation: June 20, 1997

The Tajik Ambassador in Beijing is the official representative of the Government in Dushanbe to the Government of China.

== List of representatives ==
diplomatic agreement/designated/Diplomatic accreditation	ambassador	Russian language	Observations	Prime Minister of Tajikistan	Premier of the People's Republic of China	Term end
January 4, 1992			China and Tajikistan established diplomatic relations in 1992. The Republic of Tajikistan opened its diplomatic mission in Beijing in March 1992	Akbar Mirzoyev	Li Peng	
June 20, 1997	Jamshed Karimov	ru:Каримов, Джамшед Хилолович		Yahyo Azimov	Li Peng	
2002	Bahodur Abdulloev		(*1948 in Bokhtar District) A major general of state security.	Oqil Oqilov	Zhu Rongji	December 28, 2005
December 28, 2005	Rashid Alimov	Рашид Алимов	Rashid Olimov	Oqil Oqilov	Wen Jiabao	December 1, 2015
May 19, 2016	Parviz Davlatzoda		In 2015 he was First Deputy Foreign Minister of Tajikistan	Kokhir Rasulzoda	Li Keqiang	
August 31, 2020	Saidzoda Zohir Ozod			Kokhir Rasulzoda	Li Keqiang, Li Qiang	

- China–Tajikistan relations
