= Mamadali Kurbanov =

Soviet Tajik politician (1905–1976)

- Мамадали Курбанов

Chairman of the Council of People's Commissars
- In office 14 October 1937 – c. April 1946
- Preceded by: Urunboi Ashurov
- Succeeded by: Dzhabar Rasulov (as Chairman of the Council of Ministers)

Deputy Chairman of the Council of People's Commissars
- In office 1937 – October 1937

Personal details
- Born: Mamadali Kurbanovich Kurbanov; 1905 Üch-Korgon, Osh district, Russian Turkestan
- Died: 14 May 1976 (aged 70–71) Üch-Korgon, Osh district, Kirghiz Soviet Socialist Republic
- Party: CPT
- Profession: Politician · miner

Mamadali Kurbanovich Kurbanov (Russian: Мамадали Курбанович Курбанов; Tajik: Мамадалӣ Курбонович Қурбонов; 1905 – 14 May 1976) was a Tajik politician and miner who served as Chairman of the Council of People's Commissars of the Tajik SSR from 1937 to 1946.

== Early life ==
Kurbanov was born in 1905 in Üch-Korgon, Osh district, Russian Turkestan, to a Tajik family. His family were poor farmers. He studied to become a miner and then worked at the Kyzyl-Kyya mine in Osh from 1924 to 1930, after which he served as the head of the mine's rescue and safety station from 1930 to 1931, and as the overall head of the mine from 1931 to 1933. In 1933, he became manager of the Shurab mine in the Tajik Soviet Socialist Republic.

== Political career ==
Kurbanov became a member of the Communist Party of the Soviet Union (CPSU) in 1930. In 1936, he was named the People's Commissar of Local Industry, as well as head of the department of industry and transport of the Central Committee of the Communist Party of Tajikistan. He was also elected as a deputy in the Supreme Soviet of the Tajik Soviet Socialist Republic, and in the Supreme Soviet of the Soviet Union, representing the Kulob District. Kurbanov rose to the position of Deputy Chairman of the Council of People's Commissars (deputy prime minister) in 1937, and on 14 October 1937, by a resolution of the Central Executive Committee of the Tajik SSR, was appointed Chairman of the Council of People's Commissars (prime minister). His appointment came after the Great Purge. Two years later, he became a member of the Central Auditing Commission of the Communist Party of the Soviet Union, where he served until 1952.

Kurbanov served as prime minister from 1937 until 1946 (listed in sources as April, July, or August 1946). In 1946, he was abruptly removed from office, later revealed to be due to his support for the Tajik SSR to have more autonomy from the Soviet Union. The Second Secretary of the Stalinabad obkom declared that, "It is necessary to eradicate the attitude which pits the soviet organs against the Party organs, the attitude cultivated in his time by Kurbanov, the ex-Chairman of the Council of People's Commissars."

After being removed as prime minister, Kurbanov served a year as First Deputy Minister of Agriculture of the Uzbek Soviet Socialist Republic. He was First Deputy Chairman of the Regional Executive Committee of the Fergana Region of the Uzbek SSR from 1947 to 1949, First Deputy Minister of Light Industry of the Kirghiz SSR from 1949 to 1950, and First Deputy Chairman of the Regional Executive Committee of the Osh Region of the Kirghiz SSR from 1950 to 1957. Kurbanov, an elected member of the Osh Regional Council and the Osh City Council, then served as Chairman of the Osh City Executive Committee from 1957 to 1960, after which he worked as manager of the Pamir Motor Transport Trust in the Tajik SSR.

=== Awards and honors ===
Kurbanov received several honors, including the Order of Lenin in 1939, "for outstanding achievements in agriculture of the Tajik SSR and especially for overfulfillment." He received the Order of the Badge of Honour in 1940, "for active participation in the construction of the largest irrigation system in the USSR." He was given the Order of the Red Banner of Labour in for his work in construction, and received the Order of Lenin a second time in 1944, "for the successful fulfillment of government assignments for the development of agriculture, livestock, local industry and industrial cooperation in the Tajik SSR." Kurbanov was also a recipient of the Order of the Patriotic War, 1st class, and received honorary diplomas from the Presidium of the Supreme Soviet of the Tajik SSR and of the Kirghiz SSR.

== Death and legacy ==
Kurbanov died on 14 May 1976, in Üch-Korgon. A memorial plaque dedicated to him was installed in the old Council of People's Commissars building in Dushanbe, Tajikistan. A school in his hometown was named after him, as well as several streets. A film on his life, Mamadali Kurbanov (Мамадали Курбанов), was made in 2018, and a book on his life was written by Boris Rakhmanov, called A Titan of the Socialist Era (Титан Эпохи Социализма).
