= First Secretary of the Communist Party of Tajikistan =

De facto leader of the Tajik Soviet Socialist Republic

- Котиби якуми Ҳизби коммунисти Тоҷикистон; Первый секретарь Коммунистической партии Таджикистана
- Residence: Dushanbe
- Appointer: Popular vote
- Formation: 1924
- Abolished: November 1990

The First Secretary of the Communist Party of Tajikistan was the head of the Communist Party of Tajikistan and the highest Executive power in the republic of Tajikistan from 1924 until November 1990.

== History ==
Shortly after the Soviet Union was formed in 1922 a position of First Secretary of the Communist Party was created in each Soviet Republic. The Tajik Autonomous Soviet Socialist Republic was created in 1924 as a subunit of the Uzbek Soviet Socialist Republic and the first Acting Secretary of the Communist Party of Tajikistan was appointed that year. In 1929 Tajikistan received full republic status separate from Uzbekistan and in 1930 the position of First Secretary of the Communist Party of Tajikistan was created. The position changed hands numerous times during the 1920s and 1930s due to Stalin's fear of keeping leaders in power for long periods of time. A number of the former leaders of the Communist Party of Tajikistan perished in the Great Purge of the 1930s. The leaders of Tajikistan were usually ethnic Tajiks with the exceptions of Mirzo Dovud Guseinov, Dmitri Protopopov and Grigory Broydo: the first one was an ethnic Azerbaijani while the last two were ethnic Russians who were appointed during the height of Stalin's rule. After World War II every appointed First Secretary was a Tajik from the region of Leninabad, now named Sughd. This was a reflection of the fact that the leadership of Uzbekistan highly influenced the appointment of leaders in Tajikistan and chose leaders from Leninabad because of its historic ties to Uzbekistan's urban centers in the Fergana Valley. There have even been accusations that some of the Leninabadi leaders of Tajikistan were actually Uzbek because their dialect of Tajik had a number of loan words from Uzbek. The Leninabai monopoly on power was a key factor in igniting the civil unrest that followed Tajikistan's independence in 1991 and led to the Tajikistani Civil War.

The longest serving First Secretary was Dzhabar Rasulov, who came to power in 1961 and died in office in 1982. Rasulov's successor was Rahmon Nabiyev, who was ousted in a corruption scandal in 1985. The position First Secretary was downgraded in November 1991 when then First Secretary Qahhor Mahkamov was appointed to the newly created executive position of President of the Tajik Soviet Socialist Republic. Mahkamov was the last First Secretary of the Communist Party of Tajikistan to also serve as head of state of Tajikistan when he resigned his office on August 31, 1991, following his support of the August Coup in Moscow. One of the most celebrated First Secretaries was Bobojon Ghafurov, a renowned scholar who wrote numerous works on the history of Tajikistan.

== List of secretaries ==
- Chinor Emomov (1924–1927); Acting secretary.
- Mumin Khojaev (1927–1928); Acting secretary.
- Ali Shervoni (1928–1929); Acting secretary.
- Shirinsho Shotemur (1929–1930); Acting secretary.
- Mirzo Dovud Guseinov (1930–1933); First secretary.
- Grigory Broydo (1933–1934); First secretary.
- Suren Shadunts (1934–1936); First secretary.
- Urunboi Ashurov (1936–1937); First secretary.
- Dmitri Protopopov (1937–1946); First secretary.
- Bobojon Ghafurov (1946–1956); First secretary.
- Tursun Uljabayev (1956–1961); First secretary.
- Dzhabar Rasulov (1961–1982); First secretary.
- Rahmon Nabiyev (1982–1985); First secretary, later President of Tajikistan (1991–1992).
- Qahhor Mahkamov (1985–August 31, 1991); First secretary and later inaugural President of Tajik SSR (November 1990 – August 31, 1991).
