= Abdullo Rakhimbayev =

Soviet politician (1896–1938)

- Абдулло Раҳимбоев
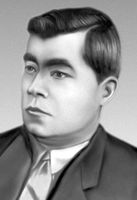

Member of the Presidium of the All-Russian Central Executive Committee
- In office 4 January 1934 – 1937
- General Secretary: Joseph Stalin
- Preceded by: Nusratullo Maksum
- Succeeded by: Position abolished

Prime Minister of the Tajik SSR
- In office 27 December 1933 – September 1937
- Preceded by: Abdurrahim Hojibayev
- Succeeded by: Urunboi Ashurov

Personal details
- Born: June 1, 1896 Khujand, Russian Empire
- Died: 7 May 1938 (aged 41) Lefortovo Prison
- Resting place: Kommunarka shooting ground
- Citizenship: Soviet Union
- Party: CPSU

Abdullo Rahimbayevich Rakhimbayev (June 1, 1896 – May 7, 1938) also spelled Abdullo Raximboyevich Raximboyev, was an ethnic Uzbek, Tajik-born Soviet politician. He was born in Khujand in modern Tajikistan. He was a recipient of the Order of Lenin. He served on the Central Executive Committee of the Soviet Union as representative of the Tajik Soviet Socialist Republic from January 1934 to September 1937. He was arrested and executed during the Great Purge. After the death of Joseph Stalin, he was rehabilitated.

Preceded by Abdurrahim Hojibayev	Prime Minister of Tajikistan; 1933–1937	Succeeded by Urunboi Ashurov
