= Order of Ismoili Somoni =

Tajikistan's highest distinction

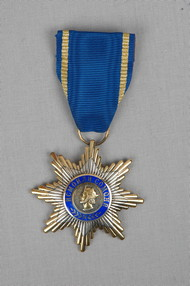
- Insignia of the order

Awarded by President of Tajikistan
- Status: Currently constituted
- Grades: First Class; Second Class; Third Class

Precedence
- Next (higher): Order of the Crown
- Next (lower): Order of the Leader of the Nation - Emomali Rahmon
- Ribbon of the order

The Order of Ismoili Somoni (Tajik: Ордени Исмоили Сомонӣ) is a high distinction of Tajikistan. It is named after Isma'il ibn Ahmad, also known as Ismoili Somoni.

== Recipients ==
=== Tajiks ===
==== Public servants ====
- Abdulmajid Dostiev

==== Military ====
- Sherali Khayrulloyev, former Minister of Defence of Tajikistan

==== Politicians ====
- Oqil Oqilov, former Prime Minister of Tajikistan
- Yahyo Azimov, former Prime Minister of Tajikistan
- Mahmadsaid Ubaydulloyev, former Mayor of Dushanbe

=== Foreigners ===
==== Neighboring nations ====
- Asif Ali Zardari, former President of Pakistan
- Burhanuddin Rabbani, former President of Afghanistan (2021)
- Ahmad Shah Massoud, former Minister of Defense of the Islamic State of Afghanistan and head of the Northern Alliance (2021)

==== Post-Soviet ====
- Ilham Aliyev, President of Azerbaijan
- Abdulla Aripov, Prime Minister of Uzbekistan (2018)
- Gurbanguly Berdimuhamedow, President of Turkmenistan (2010)
- Abdulaziz Kamilov, Minister of Foreign Affairs of Uzbekistan (2018)
- Nursultan Nazarbayev, President of Kazakhstan
- Vladimir Putin, President of Russia (2007)
- Viktor Yanukovych, former President of Ukraine (2011)
- Valdis Zatlers, former President of Latvia (2009)

==== Rest of the world ====
- Ban Ki-moon, former Secretary-General of the United Nations
- Ekmeleddin İhsanoğlu, former Secretary-General of the Organisation of Islamic Cooperation
- Sabah Al-Ahmad Al-Jaber Al-Sabah, former Emir of Kuwait
