= Tolpygo =

Tolpygo (Russian: Толпыго, Ukrainian: Толпиго) is a Russian and Ukrainian surname. Notable people with the surname include:

- Boris Tolpygo, Soviet communist politician
- Kirill Tolpygo, Soviet Ukrainian scientist
- Sergey K. Tolpygo, scientist working on superconductivity
- Alexander S. Tolpygo, Chief Operating Officer of SFL Scientific
