= Sirojiddin Muhriddin =

Tajik politician (born 1964)

- Сироҷиддин Муҳриддин
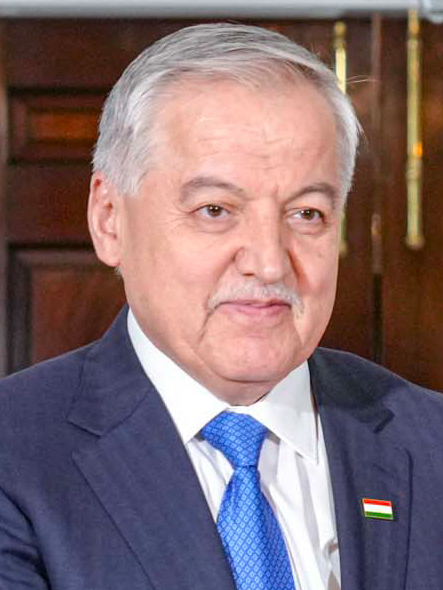
- Muhriddin in 2026

Minister of Foreign Affairs
- Incumbent
- Assumed office 29 November 2013
- President: Emomali Rahmon
- Preceded by: Hamrokhon Zarifi

Permanent Representative of Tajikistan to the United Nations
- In office September 2005 – August 2013
- Preceded by: Rashid Alimov
- Succeeded by: Mahmadamin Mahmadaminov

Personal details
- Born: Sirodjidin Mukhridinovich Aslov; 17 February 1964 (age 62) Sovetskiy District, Tajik SSR, Soviet Union
- Education: Odesa Hydrometeorological Institute

Sirojiddin Muhriddin (Tajik: Сироҷиддин Муҳриддин; born Sirojiddin Muhriddinovich Aslov (Russian: Сироджиддин Мухриддинович Аслов; 17 February 1964) is the Minister of Foreign Affairs of Tajikistan since 2013. Muhriddin previously worked as a Permanent Representative of the Republic of Tajikistan to the United Nations from 2006 to 2013.

== Biography ==
Muhriddin meets with U.S. Secretary of State Antony Blinken in Washington, D.C., on July 1, 2021.

Muhriddin graduated with an engineering degree in 1986 from Odesa Hydrometeorological Institute in Ukraine. Muhriddin continued his studies by receiving an additional degree in International Economic Relations from the Tashkent State University of Economics. In the early stages of Muhriddin's career, he had published several research papers based on the Aral Sea. In the early 2000s, he made a transition into the Ministry of Foreign Affairs, where he was first appointed as a deputy minister. While being the Deputy Minister of Foreign Affairs, he was also chairman of the executive committee for Saving the Aral Sea and the National Coordinator for Shanghai Cooperation Organization (SCO) Affairs. After a year as serving Deputy, Muhriddin was appointed as the Permanent Representative of Tajikistan to the United Nations as well as the non-resident ambassador to Cuba. After seven years of work within the United Nations he became the Minister of Foreign Affairs of Tajikistan in 2013.

== Awards ==
- Order of Glory (Tajikistan) (2010)
- Order of Friendship (Russia) (2017)
- Order "Fidokorona khizmatlari uchun" (2018)

== Personal life ==
He is married, with five children, and speaks Persian, English, Uzbek and Russian.

== See also ==
- List of foreign ministers in 2017
- List of current foreign ministers
