= Hero of Tajikistan =

- Type: Award
- Awarded for: Service to Tajikistan and Society
- Presented by: Tajikistan
- Eligibility: Tajik and foreign citizens
- First award: 16 December 1996
- Related: Hero of Russia

The title Hero of Tajikistan (Tajik: Қаҳрамони Тоҷикистон) is a state award of Tajikistan. It was first awarded in 1996 and was awarded for service to the implementation of domestic and foreign policy.

== Description ==
Persons awarded the title "Hero of Tajikistan" are awarded a special distinction - the gold star "Hero of Tajikistan", which is worn on a ribbon on the left side of the chest.

- Are provided with housing according to established standards on a priority basis. The living space occupied by them and their family members and utilities are paid at a rate of 50 percent;
- Those in need of spa treatment are provided with a free voucher to a sanatorium or rest home every year
- Have the right to free personal travel once a year within the Republic of Tajikistan.

The deceased's "Hero of Tajikistan" gold star and award documents remain with their heirs as a keepsake. With the consent of the deceased's heirs, their awards and award documents may be transferred to state museums for storage and display. If the deceased has no heirs, their awards and award documents are automatically returned to the state.

== List of recipients ==
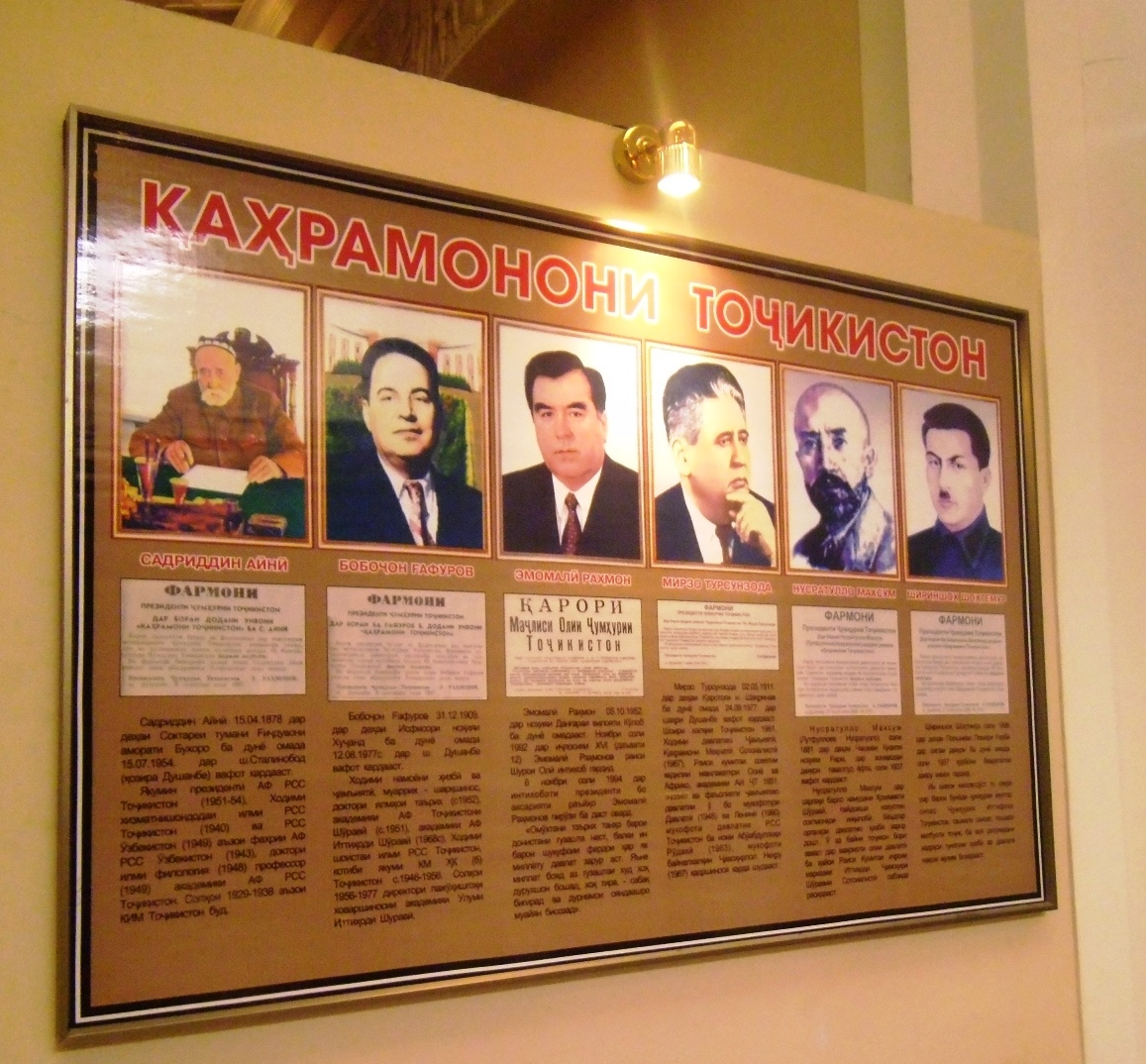
Portraits of recipients of the title in a museum in Khujand.

Name	Photo	Date	Description
Sadriddin Ayni		8 September 1996	Posthumously
Bobojon Ghafurov		1997	Posthumously
Emomali Rahmon		1999	
Mirzo Tursunzoda		2001	Posthumously
Nusratullo Maksum		27 June 2006	Posthumously
Shirinsho Shotemur		27 June 2006	Posthumously
Nisar Muhammad Yousafzai		27 June 2006	Posthumously
