= Isfayramsay =

River in Kyrgyzstan and Uzbekistan

Isfayramsay Isfayramsoy
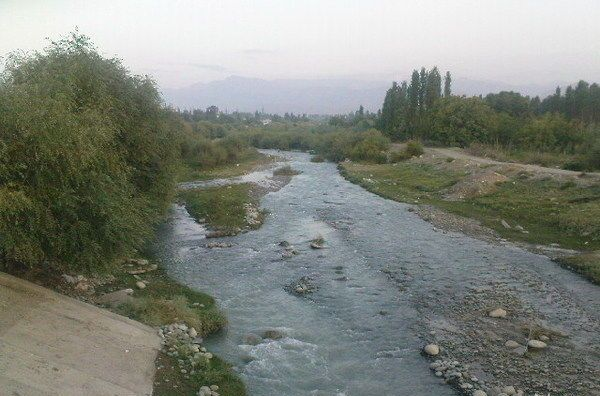

- Location within Uzbekistan Location within Kyrgyzstan

Location
- Country: Kyrgyzstan, Uzbekistan

Physical characteristics
- Source: Alay Range
- Mouth: Great Fergana Canal
  - coordinates: 40°35′25″N 71°49′39″E
- Length: 122 km (76 mi)
- Basin size: 2,220 km^{2} (860 sq mi)
- Discharge
  - location: Üch-Korgon
  - average: 21.9 m^{3}/s (770 cu ft/s)

Basin features
- Progression: Great Fergana Canal→ Syr Darya→ North Aral Sea

The Isfayramsay (Kyrgyz: Исфайрамсай, romanized: Isfayramsay, Uzbek: Isfayramsoy) is a river in Kyrgyzstan and Uzbekistan. Its source is in the Alay Range, where it is fed by many glaciers. Due to use for irrigation, it does not reach the Syr Darya anymore, but ends at the Great Fergana Canal north of Fergana. The river is 122 km (76 mi) long, and the watershed covers 2,220 km^{2} (860 sq mi). The main settlements along the river Isfayramsay are the city Quvasoy in Uzbekistan, and the villages Üch-Korgon and Maydan in Kyrgyzstan. Its largest tributaries are the Kichik-Alay, Sürmötash, Shibe and Tegermach. Its annual average flow rate is 21.9 m^{3}/s (770 cu ft/s) at Üch-Korgon.
