= List of ambassadors of Russia to Togo =

Ambassador of the Russian Federation to the Togolese Republic
- Emblem of the Russian Foreign Ministry

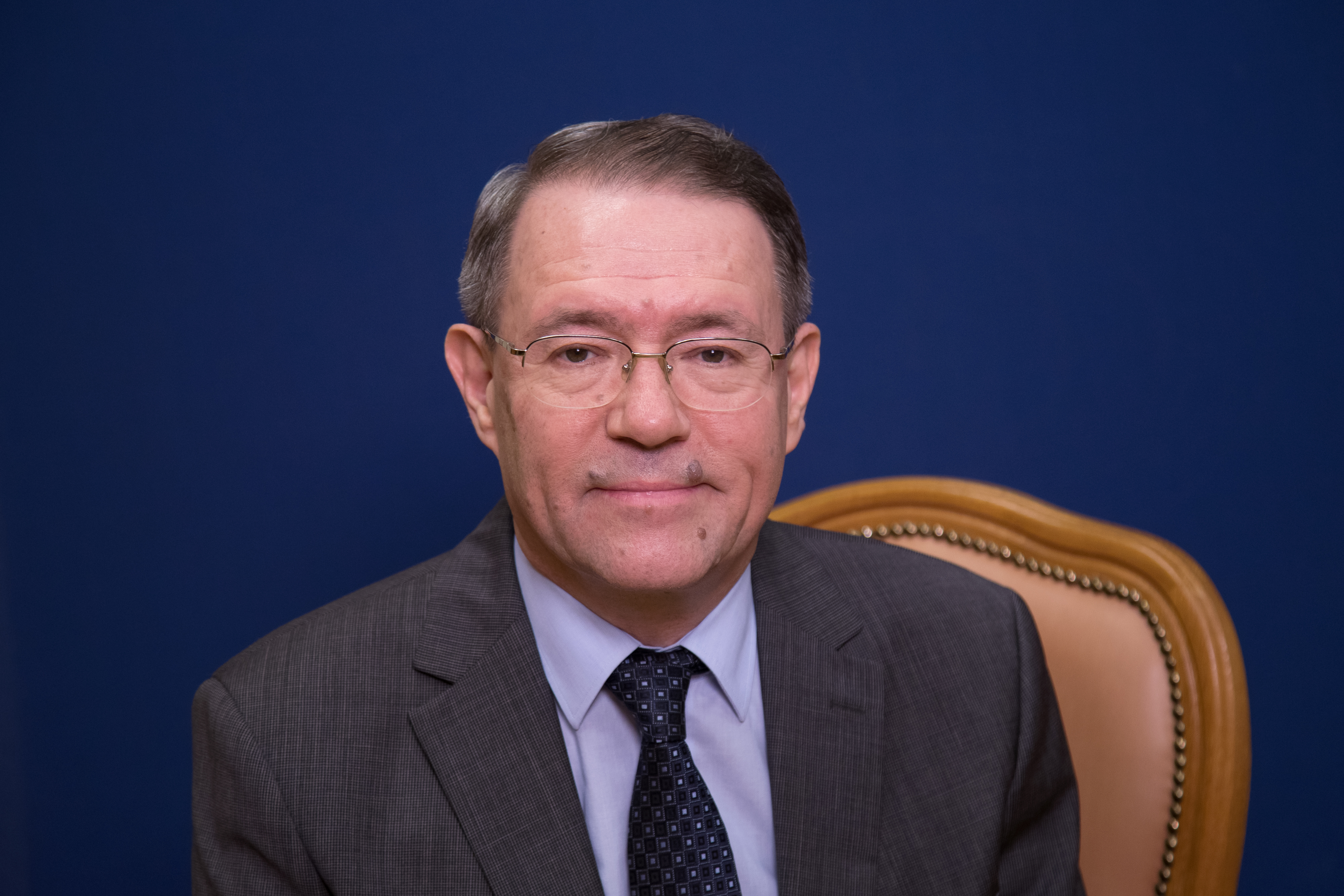
- Incumbent; Igor Yevdokimov since 4 September 2017
- Ministry of Foreign Affairs; Embassy of Russia in Cotonou
- Style: His Excellency; The Honourable
- Reports to: Minister of Foreign Affairs
- Seat: Cotonou
- Appointer: President of Russia
- Term length: At the pleasure of the president
- Website: Embassy of Russia in Benin

The ambassador extraordinary and plenipotentiary of the Russian Federation to the Togolese Republic is the official representative of the president and the government of the Russian Federation to the president and the government of Togo.

The ambassador and his staff work at large in the Embassy of Russia in Cotonou. The post of Russian ambassador to Togo is currently held by Igor Yevdokimov, incumbent since 4 September 2017. Since 1992, the Russian ambassador to Togo is a non-resident ambassador who has dual accreditation as the ambassador to Benin.

== History of diplomatic relations ==
Diplomatic relations at the mission level between the Soviet Union and Togo were first established on 1 May 1960. The first ambassador, Dzhabar Rasulov, was appointed on 15 June 1960. With the dissolution of the Soviet Union in 1991, the Soviet ambassador, Oleg Chyorny, continued as representative of the Russian Federation until 1992. In 1992, the embassy in Lomé was closed as part of cost-saving measures, and the incumbent ambassador to Benin, Yury Chepik, was appointed concurrently as ambassador to Togo, a practice that has since continued.

== List of representatives (1960–present) ==
=== Soviet Union to Togo (1960–1991) ===
Name	Title	Appointment	Termination	Notes
Dzhabar Rasulov	Ambassador	15 June 1960	2 July 1961	Credentials presented on 9 August 1960
Anvar Kuchkarov	Ambassador	2 July 1961	19 February 1966	Credentials presented on 7 September 1961
Nikolai Smolin	Ambassador	19 February 1966	23 November 1970	Credentials presented on 22 April 1966
Pyotr Slyusarenko	Ambassador	23 November 1970	11 September 1978	Credentials presented on 30 December 1970
Ivan Ilyukhin	Ambassador	11 September 1978	14 October 1984	Credentials presented on 21 November 1978
Sergey Shaverdyan	Ambassador	14 October 1984	27 May 1987	Credentials presented on 19 November 1984
Yury Kotov	Ambassador	27 May 1987	July 1988	Did not take up post
Oleg Chyorny	Ambassador	30 June 1989	25 December 1991	

=== Russian Federation to Togo (1991–present) ===
Name	Title	Appointment	Termination	Notes
Oleg Chyorny	Ambassador	25 December 1991	2 November 1992	
Yury Chepik	Ambassador	31 December 1992	8 May 1998	Concurrently ambassador to Benin
Vladimir Timofeyev	Ambassador	30 September 1998	17 July 2002	Concurrently ambassador to Benin
Vladimir Timoshenko	Ambassador	17 February 2003	30 June 2008	Concurrently ambassador to Benin
Yury Grashchenkov	Ambassador	30 June 2008	31 May 2013	Concurrently ambassador to Benin
Oleg Kovalchuk	Ambassador	31 May 2013	7 August 2017	Concurrently ambassador to Benin
Igor Yevdokimov	Ambassador	4 September 2017		Concurrently ambassador to Benin; Credentials presented on 5 June 2018
