= List of awards and honours received by Viktor Yanukovych =

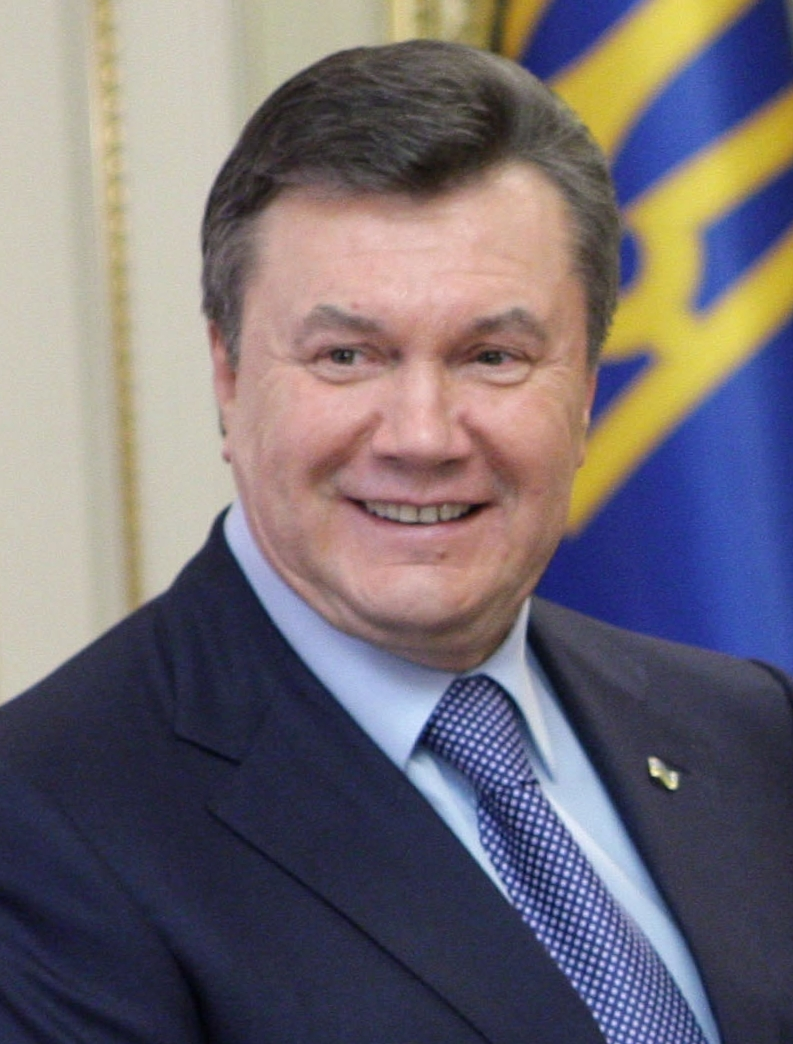
Viktor Yanukovych in 2011

This is a list of awards and honours received by Viktor Yanukovych, a Ukrainian political leader who was both Prime Minister of Ukraine (2002-2005, 2006-2007) and President of Ukraine (2010-2014).

== Awards ==
=== Ukraine ===
Award or decoration	Date
Order of Merit (1st Class)	3 July 2002
Order of Merit (2nd Class)	3 July 2000
Order of Merit (3rd Class)	13 November 1998
Honored Transport Worker of Ukraine	18 October 1995
Honorary Diploma of the Cabinet of Ministers of Ukraine	2000
Sign "Miner's Valor" (1st class); Sign "Miner's Valor" (2nd class); Sign "Miner's Valor" (3rd class)	2007
Miner's Glory Medal (1st class); Miner's Glory Medal (2nd class); Miner's Glory Medal (3rd class)	

=== Foreign ===
Award or decoration	Country	Date
Order of St. Mesrop Mashtots	Armenia	30 June 2011
Medal of Anania Shirakatsi	Armenia	2004
Heydar Aliyev Order	Azerbaijan	November 2013
Royal Family Order of the Crown of Brunei	Brunei	March 2011
Order of José Martí	Cuba	22 October 2011
Grand Cross of the Legion of Honour	France	2010
Presidential Order of Excellence	Georgia	2013
Grand Cordon of Order of the Chrysanthemum	Japan	23 January 2011
Order of Friendship (1st class)	Kazakhstan	6 July 2010
Order of the Precious Wand	Mongolia	June 2011
Order of Independence	Qatar	November 2012
Order of the Republic of Serbia (1st class)	Serbia	22 February 2013
Order of Ismoili Somoni	Tajikistan	15 December 2011
Order of Zayed	United Arab Emirates	November 2012

=== Confessional ===
Award or decoration	Church	Date
Order of Saint Vladimir (1st Class)	Russian Orthodox Church	2010
Order of Saint Vladimir (2nd Class)	Russian Orthodox Church	2004
Order of Saint Vladimir (3rd Class)	Russian Orthodox Church	1998
Order of Holy Prince Daniel of Moscow (1st class)	Russian Orthodox Church	2004
Order of St. Sergius of Radonezh (1st class)	Russian Orthodox Church	2004
Order "Distinction of the Primate of the Ukrainian Orthodox Church"	Ukrainian Orthodox Church	2010
Order of the Holy Monk Nestor the Chronicler	Ukrainian Orthodox Church	1998
Order of the Holy Sepulchre	Church of the Holy Sepulchre	2011

=== Sports organisations ===
- Olympic Order (2007)
- Gold medal of the International Ice Hockey Federation (2003)
- Badge of Honor of the National Olympic Committee of Ukraine (2005)
- Gold medal and diploma of Ukrainian Premier League (2008)

== Honorary titles and honours ==
=== Doctorates ===
Title	Date
Honorary Doctorate from National University Odesa Law Academy	2007
Honorary Doctorate from Donetsk National Technical University	

=== Honorary Citizenships ===
Title	Country	Date
Honorary Citizen of Donetsk Oblast	Ukraine	2002
Honorary Citizen of Myrnohrad	Ukraine	2006
Honorary Citizen of Yenakiieve	Ukraine	

=== Other honors ===
- A square in the city in of Spitak, Armenia, was named in honor of Yanukovych in 2008.
- Yanukovych was recognised as 'Politician of the Year', by the magazine Vedomosti in 2010.
