= Suren Shadunts =

Tajikisstani politician (1898 – 1938)

- Սուրեն Շադունց
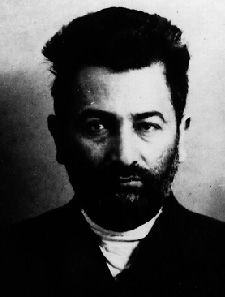

First Secretary of the Communist Party of Tajikistan
- In office 1934–1937
- Preceded by: Grigory Broydo
- Succeeded by: Urunboi Ushturov

Personal details
- Born: Suren Konstantinovich Shadunts; 1898 Jabrayil, Elisabethpol Governorate, Russian Empire
- Died: 21 April 1938 (aged 39–40)
- Party: Russian Communist Party (1917–1937)
- Awards: Order of Lenin

Suren Konstantinovich Shadunts (Armenian: Սուրեն Կոստանդինի Շադունց; 1898 – 1938) was First Secretary of the Communist Party of Tajikistan between 1934 and 1937.

== Life and career ==
Of Armenian descent, Shadunts was born in Jabrayil, Elisabethpol Governorate, Russian Empire (now Azerbaijan) in 1898. He received his early education in Shusha. In 1917, Shadunts became a member of the Communist Party. He became an activist for the communist cause in Azerbaijan. In 1921, he went to Armenia and participated in the fighting as a result of the establishment of Republic of Mountainous Armenia. After the Republic of Mountainous Armenia was dismembered, Shadunts became the Executive Secretary of the Municipal Committee in Yerevan in 1923. He became the head of the Department of Water Resources of the People's Commissariat of Agriculture of the Armenian SSR in 1923 and served this position until 1927. From 1928 to 1931, he was the head of the Transcaucasian Water Management bureau.

Shadunts eventually became the chairman of the Central Asian Cotton-growing Company in 1932 and remained at this post for two years. Immediately thereafter, he became the secretary for the Central Asian Bureau of Communist USSR. A year later, in 1935, Shadunts became the first secretary of Tajikistan SSR. In the same year, he was awarded the Order of Lenin for his outstanding achievements in the field of agriculture and for exceeding state plans.

While on a working visit in Moscow, Shadunts was arrested for 'counter-revolutionary' activity and was sentenced to death; his execution took place in 1938.

Shadunts' reputation was formally reestablished in 1957.
