= Rashid Alimov =

Tajik politician (born 1953)

- Рашид Алимов
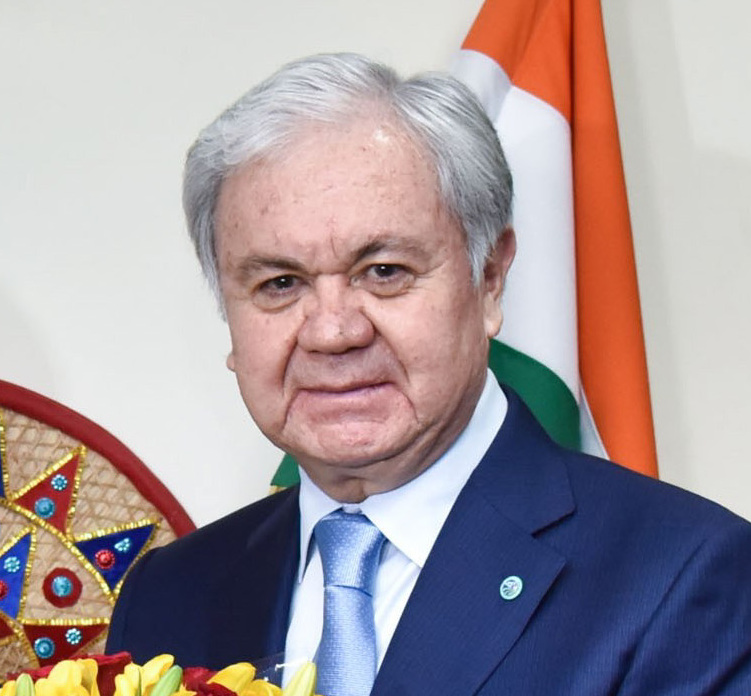
- Alimov in 2018

Secretary-General of the Shanghai Cooperation Organisation
- In office 1 January 2016 – 31 December 2018
- Preceded by: Dmitry Mezentsev
- Succeeded by: Vladimir Norov

Ambassador of Tajikistan to China
- In office 28 December 2005 – 1 December 2015
- Preceded by: Bahodur Abdulloev
- Succeeded by: Parviz Davlatzoda

Permanent Representative of Tajikistan to the United Nations
- In office 28 December 1994 – December 2005
- Preceded by: Lakim Kayumov
- Succeeded by: Sirojiddin Muhriddin

Minister of Foreign Affairs of the Republic of Tajikistan
- In office 2 December 1992 – 27 December 1994
- Preceded by: Khudoberdy Kholiknazarov
- Succeeded by: Talbak Nazarov

Personal details
- Born: 23 June 1953 (age 73) Stalinabad, Tajik SSR, USSR
- Education: Tajik National University

Rashid Alimov, also referred to as Rashid Qutbiddinovich Alimov or Rashid Qutbiddinovich Olimov, (born 23 June 1953) is the former minister of Foreign Affairs of the Republic of Tajikistan from 1992 to 1994. He was also the Permanent Representative of Tajikistan to the United Nations from 1994 to 2005, Tajikistan's ambassador to China from 2005 to 2015, and the Secretary-General of the Shanghai Cooperation Organisation from 2016 to 2018.

== Career ==
Alimov was born in Stalinabad (now Dushanbe). He studied history at the Tajik National University, graduating in 1975. He continued to study social sciences at the Academy of Sciences of the Soviet Union, where he earned a doctorate in political science. He became the deputy chair of Tajik National University's joint trade union committee, and spent much of the 1970s working in various positions for the Komsomol and the Communist Party of Tajikistan. In the early 1990s he was a youth representative at the Supreme Soviet of the Tajik SSR, and an advisor to the president of Tajikistan. In 1994 he was named Tajikistan's permanent representative to the United Nations, a post he held until 2005. That year, he became Tajikistan's ambassador to China, working in that role until 2015.

In 2017, Alimov worked as the Secretary-General of the Shanghai Cooperation Organisation. While there, he wrote the book SCO: Global Profile in International Relations.

== Selected works ==
- SCO: Global Profile in International Relations (2018)
- "The Shanghai Cooperation Organisation: Its role and place in the development of Eurasia", Journal of Eurasian studies (2018)
