= Jabbor Rasulov =

Tajik politician; First Secretary of the Communist Party of Tajikistan (1913–1982)

Dzhabar Rasulov
- Ҷаббор Расулов

First Secretary of the Communist Party of Tajikistan
- In office April 12, 1961 – April 4, 1982
- Preceded by: Tursun Uljabayev
- Succeeded by: Rahmon Nabiyev

Personal details
- Born: 10 July 1913 Khujand, Samarkand Oblast, Russian Turkestan, Russian Empire
- Died: 4 April 1982 (aged 68) Dushanbe, Tajik SSR, Soviet Union
- Party: CPSU

Dzhabar Rasulovich Rasulov, also given as Jabbor Rasulovich Rasulov (Tajik: Ҷаббор Расулович Расулов, Russian: Джабар Расулович Расулов; 10 July 1913 – 4 April 1982) was a Soviet politician who served as the First Secretary of the Communist Party of Tajikistan from 1961 to 1982. Prior to his tenure as First Secretary, he was deputy minister of agriculture from 1955 to 1958, and ambassador to Togo from 1960 to 1961.

== Early life ==
Jabbor Rasulov was born in Khujand, Russian Turkestan, on 10 July 1913. He graduated from the Central Asian Cotton Institute in 1934.

== Career ==
Rasulov was appointed head of the Department of the People's Commissariat of Agriculture of the Tajik Soviet Socialist Republic in 1938. He was Deputy People's Commissar of Agriculture from 1940 to 1941, and People's Commissar of Agriculture of the Tajik SSR in 1945. Rasulov was deputy minister of agriculture of the Soviet Union from 1955 to 1958.

Rasulov served as chair of the Council of Ministers from 1946 to 1955.

Rasulov was a member of the Central Auditing Commission of the Communist Party of the Soviet Union from 14 October 1952 to 14 February 1956.

Rasulov was appointed as ambassador to Togo in 1960 and served until 1961.

=== First Secretary ===
Rasulov was secretary of the Central Committee of the Communist Party of Tajikistan from 1958 to 1960. Rasulov replaced Tursun Uljabayev as First Secretary of the Communist Party of Tajikistan. Rasulov appointed Uljabayev to lead a state farm. He served as First Secretary from 1961 to 1982.

The Nurek Dam, which started construction under Uljabayev, was completed under Rasulov. Cotton production rose to 1 million tons by 1980.

== Death and legacy ==
Rasulov died in Dushanbe on 4 April 1982, after suffering a heart attack. Rahmon Nabiyev was selected to replace Rasulov as First Secretary. Emomali Rahmon named the Jabbor Rasulov District in honour of Rasulov in 1993.

== Works cited ==
=== Books ===
- Kalinovsky, Artemy (2018). Laboratory of Socialist Development: Cold War Politics and Decolonization in Soviet Tajikistan. Cornell University Press. ISBN 9781501715563.
- Nourzhanov, Kirill; Bleuer, Christian (2013). Tajikistan: A Political and Social History. ANU Press. ISBN 9781925021158.

=== Journals ===
- Roberts, Flora (2018). "A Controversial Dam in Stalinist Central Asia: Rivalry and "Fraternal Cooperation" on the Syr Darya*". Ab Imperio (2). Ab Imperio: 117–143. doi:10.1353/imp.2018.0030.

=== News ===
- "Dzhabar Rasulov, 68; Regional Soviet Leader". The New York Times. 18 April 1982. Archived from the original on 24 May 2015.
- "От Гафурова до Рахмона: Взгляд на заслуги пяти руководителей Таджикистана" [From Gafurov to Rahmon: A Look at the Achievements of Five Tajik Leaders]. Radio Ozodi (in Russian). 31 August 2014. Archived from the original on 11 April 2020.

=== Web ===
- "Расулов Джабар" [Rasulov Dzhabar] (in Russian). Handbook on History of the Communist Party and the Soviet Union 1898–1991. Archived from the original on 14 February 2018.
