= Üch-Korgon =

Üch-Korgon Kyrgyz: Үч-Коргон
- Location within Kyrgyzstan
- Coordinates: 40°13′48″N 72°03′36″E
- Country: Kyrgyzstan
- Region: Batken Region
- District: Kadamjay District
- Elevation: 1,025 m (3,363 ft)

Population (2021)
  - Total: 14,708
- Time zone: UTC+6

Üch-Korgon (Kyrgyz: Үч-Коргон [ʏ́tɕʰ qɔrʁɔ́n]; Russian: Уч-Коргон), is a large village in Batken Region of Kyrgyzstan. It is part of the Kadamjay District. With a population of 14,708 (2021), it is the largest village in the region. Under Soviet rule the village was named Molotovabad.

There is a river named Isfayram Soy. Isfayram Soy gives its water to the residents of Üch-Korgon, Kyzyl-Kiya and to other villages around Üch-Korgon and flows further to Quvasoy, a town in Uzbekistan. There are 11 schools in Üch-Korgon such as A.S. Pushkin, Ayniy, Jomiy, etc. Most of the population in Üch-Korgon is involved in growing and selling/exporting cherries, pears and apples. Cherries of Üch-Korgon, known as "type three cherry," are the most popular and are claimed to be the largest in the world. Cherries ripen late May and early June.

== Population ==
Historical population
Year	Pop.	±% p.a.
2009	11,820	—
2021	14,708	+1.84%
Note: resident population; Sources:

== Notable people ==
- Mamadali Kurbanov – Soviet Tajik politician and miner
