= Vladimir Timoshenko =

Russian diplomat (1943–2025)

- Владимир Тимошенко

Ambassador of Russia to Benin
- In office 17 July 2002 – 30 June 2008
- Preceded by: Vladimir Timofeyev
- Succeeded by: Yury Grashchenkov

Personal details
- Born: 26 May 1943 Revda, Sverdlovsk Oblast, Russian SFSR, USSR
- Died: 16 September 2025 (aged 82)
- Education: Diplomatic Academy of the Ministry of Foreign Affairs of the Russian Federation
- Occupation: Diplomat

Vladimir Semyonovich Timoshenko (Russian: Владимир Семенович Тимошенко; 26 May 1943 – 16 September 2025) was a Russian career diplomat who served as ambassador to Benin, concurrently accredited to Togo.

== Life and career ==
Timoshenko was born in Revda, Sverdlovsk Oblast, Russian SFSR, USSR on 26 May 1943.

In December 2002, Timoshenko was appointed ambassador of Russia to Benin, with concurrent accreditation to Togo, and held this appointment until his retirement on 30 June 2008.

He spoke Russian, English, French and Ukrainian.

Timoshenko died on 16 September 2025, at the age of 82.
