= Nisar Muhammad Yousafzai =

Afghan communist revolutionary, educationist, Soviet politician (1897–1937)

- نسار محمد یوسفزی; Нисор Мухаммад Юсуфзай

People's Commissar for Education for the Tajik SSR
- In office 1926–1937
- Preceded by: Position established

Personal details
- Born: 1897 Swabi, North-West Frontier Province, British India
- Died: 8 October 1937 (aged 39–40) Moscow, Russian SFSR, Soviet Union
- Party: Communist Party of the Soviet Union
- Awards: Order of Gallantry (Emirate of Afghanistan); Hero of Tajikistan

Military service
- Allegiance: Afghanistan (1919); Soviet Union (1919–1937)
- Branch/service: Royal Afghan Army
- Battles/wars: Third Anglo-Afghan War; Jungle Movement of Gilan

Nisar Muhammad Yousafzai (Pashto: نثار محمد یوسفزی; Russian: Нисор Мухаммад Юсуфзай, romanized: Nisor Mukhammad Yusufzay; 1897 – 8 October 1937) was an Afghan communist revolutionary, educationist, soldier and Soviet politician who played a significant role in the creation of Tajikistan. A decorated soldier of the Third Anglo-Afghan War, Nisar would take part in a Soviet expedition in Gilan and later be one of the main proponents advocating for the creation of a Tajik Soviet Socialist Republic within the Soviet Union. He was Tajikistan's first minister of education from 1926 until his murder in 1937. He was also the first ever Afghan communist.

== Early life ==
Nisar Muhammad Yousafzai was born to a Esapzai Pashtun family in the village of Zaida, Swabi District of the North-West Frontier Province in 1897. He was the son of Awal Khan and his grandfather was Mohammad Ali.

== Third Anglo-Afghan War ==
In 1919 Afghanistan under King Amanullah Khan started the Third Anglo-Afghan War in an attempt to retake the Pashtun regions west of the Indus river. Nisar Muhammad being an ethnic Pashtun enlisted in the Afghan Army to fight the British and reunite his homeland with Afghanistan, he received the Afghan Order of Courage medal for his bravery. Following the war, Swabi remained under British occupation and Nisar found himself sentenced to death. However, he managed to escape captivity and sought refuge in Tashkent, where he assumed the name Nisor Avalovich Magomedov.

== Soviet politics ==
In Tashkent, Nisar Muhammad became an active member of the Communist Party of the Soviet Union. He became an advocate for a separate Tajik state outside of the Turkestan SSR. Muhammad along with others, published newspapers and campaigned for Tajik autonomy. In 1924, the Tajik Autonomous Soviet Socialist Republic was formed as part of the Uzbek Soviet Socialist Republic and would later become the Tajik Soviet Socialist Republic. In 1920, Muhammad joined a Soviet team tasked with reporting on the events unfolding in Persia (now Iran). During this mission, Muhammad provided support to Mirza Kuchik Khan, leader of the Persian Socialist Soviet Republic.

In 1926, Nisar Muhammad was appointed as the People's Commissar of Education of Tajikistan. He also served as a Pashto language instructor at Moscow University, Nisar was fluent in multiple languages including his native Pashto, Persian, Russian, and Uzbek.

== Death ==
On 8 October 1937, Nisar Muhammad was arrested on false charges by the NKVD (People's Commissariat for Internal Affairs) during the Great Purge. During his interrogation, a guard struck Muhammad, triggering an altercation in which the interrogator sustained severe head injuries. The guards storming the room and shot Muhammad.

== Legacy ==
The story of Nisar Muhammad Yousafzai was featured by Kabul Magazine in the 1960s by chief researcher of the Afghanistan Academy of Sciences at Kabul University, Dost Shinwari under the name Nisar Muhammad Afghan.

The street that is home to the Ministry of Education and Science, bears Nisar's name. In 2021, the acclaimed Tajik director Safarbek Solekh released a documentary titled "Nisar," which featured interviews with Muhammad's descendants and Tajik historians. He is described as "The son of Afghans who dedicated his life for Tajiks".

== See also ==
- Khalq
- Third Anglo-Afghan War
- People's Democratic Party of Afghanistan
- Nur Muhammad Taraki
- Hafizullah Amin
- Afzal Bangash
- Abdul Ghaffar Khan
