= Jamshed Karimov =

Prime Minister of Tajikistan from 1994 to 1996

- Ҷамшед Каримов
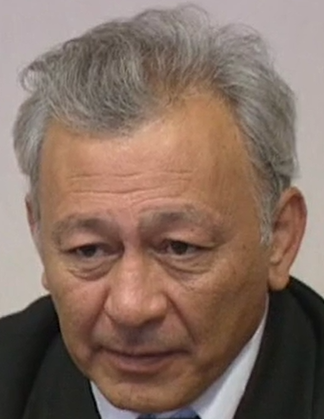
- Karimov during meeting with Hans van den Broek in 1994.

5th Prime Minister of Tajikistan
- In office 2 December 1994 – 8 February 1996
- President: Emomali Rahmon
- Preceded by: Abdujalil Samadov
- Succeeded by: Yahyo Azimov

Personal details
- Born: 4 August 1940 (age 86) Dushanbe, Tajik SSR, USSR
- Party: Independent

Jamshed Khilolovich Karimov (Note: Tajik: Ҷамшед Хилолович Каримов) (born 4 August 1940) is a Tajikistani politician who served as the fifth prime minister of Tajikistan between 2 December 1994 and 8 February 1996. He is a cousin of former president of Uzbekistan, Islam Karimov. From 20 June 1997 to 2002 he was Tajik Ambassador to China.

== Biography ==
Karimov was born on 4 August 1940 in Dushanbe. In 1962, he graduated from the Moscow Technological Institute of Light Industry and in 1968 from the Central Economics and Mathematics Institute of the Soviet Academy of Sciences. From 1962 to 1981 he worked as an assistant at the Department of Industrial Economics of Tajik State University. Beginning in March 1989 until the fall of the USSR, Karimov was a member of the Congress of People's Deputies of the Soviet Union.

At the same time, he held the post of First Secretary of the Dushanbe City Committee of the Communist Party of Tajikistan. From January to July 1991, Karimov was deputy prime minister, then from July to the following November, first deputy prime minister. In 1994, State Adviser to the President for Social and Economic Policy. On 2 December of that, he was appointed prime minister, holding this position until 8 February 1996, after leading a cabinet with little powers at the time. On 9 January 1997, he was posted to the Tajik embassy in Beijing, arriving in June.

== Notes ==
Political offices
Preceded by Abdujalil Samadov	Prime Minister of Tajikistan; 1994-1996	Succeeded by Yahyo Azimov
