= Abdujalil Samadov =

Prime Minister of Tajikistan from 1993 to 1994

- Абдуҷалил Самадов

4th Prime Minister of Tajikistan
- In office 18 December 1993 – 2 December 1994
- President: Vacant; Emomali Rahmon
- Preceded by: Abdumalik Abdullajanov
- Succeeded by: Jamshed Karimov

Personal details
- Born: 4 November 1949 Khujand, Tajik SSR
- Died: 18 March 2004 (aged 54) Moscow, Russia
- Party: Independent

Abdujalil Akhadovich Samadov (4 November 1949 – 18 March 2004) was a Tajikistani politician. He was the fourth prime minister of Tajikistan between 18 December 1993, and 2 December 1994.

Political offices
Preceded by Abdumalik Abdullajanov	Prime Minister of Tajikistan; 1993–1994	Succeeded by Jamshed Karimov
