= Karavan, Batken =

Karavan Караван
- Location within Kyrgyzstan
- Coordinates: 40°17′40″N 72°11′10″E
- Country: Kyrgyzstan
- Region: Batken Region
- City: Kyzyl-Kiya

Population (2021)
  - Total: 8,657

Karavan is a village in Batken Region of Kyrgyzstan. Its population was 8,657 in 2021. Administratively, it is part of the city Kyzyl-Kiya.
