= Yury Grashchenkov =

Russian diplomat (1945–2022)

- Юрий Гращенков

Ambassador of Russia to Benin
- In office 30 June 2008 – 31 May 2013
- Preceded by: Vladimir Timoshenko
- Succeeded by: Oleg Kovalchuk

Personal details
- Born: 11 July 1945
- Died: 26 January 2022 (aged 76)
- Education: Moscow State Institute of International Relations
- Occupation: diplomat

Yury Grigoriyevich Grashchenkov (Russian: Юрий Григорьевич Гращенков; 11 July 1945 – 26 January 2022) was a career diplomat and the former Russian ambassador to Benin, concurrently accredited to Togo.

Grashchenkov graduated from the Moscow State Institute of International Relations in 1974, and went on to work in various diplomatic posts in the central offices of the Ministry of Foreign Affairs and abroad.

From 1999 to 2002, he was the Russian Consul-General in Ho Chi Minh City, Vietnam. On 30 June 2008 Grashchenkov was appointed by Dmitry Medvedev to the post of Ambassador of Russia to Benin, with concurrent accreditation to Togo.

Grashchenkov spoke Russian, English, French and Khmer. He died on 26 January 2022, at the age of 76.
