= Dmitri Protopopov =

Secretary of the Communist Party of Tajikistan

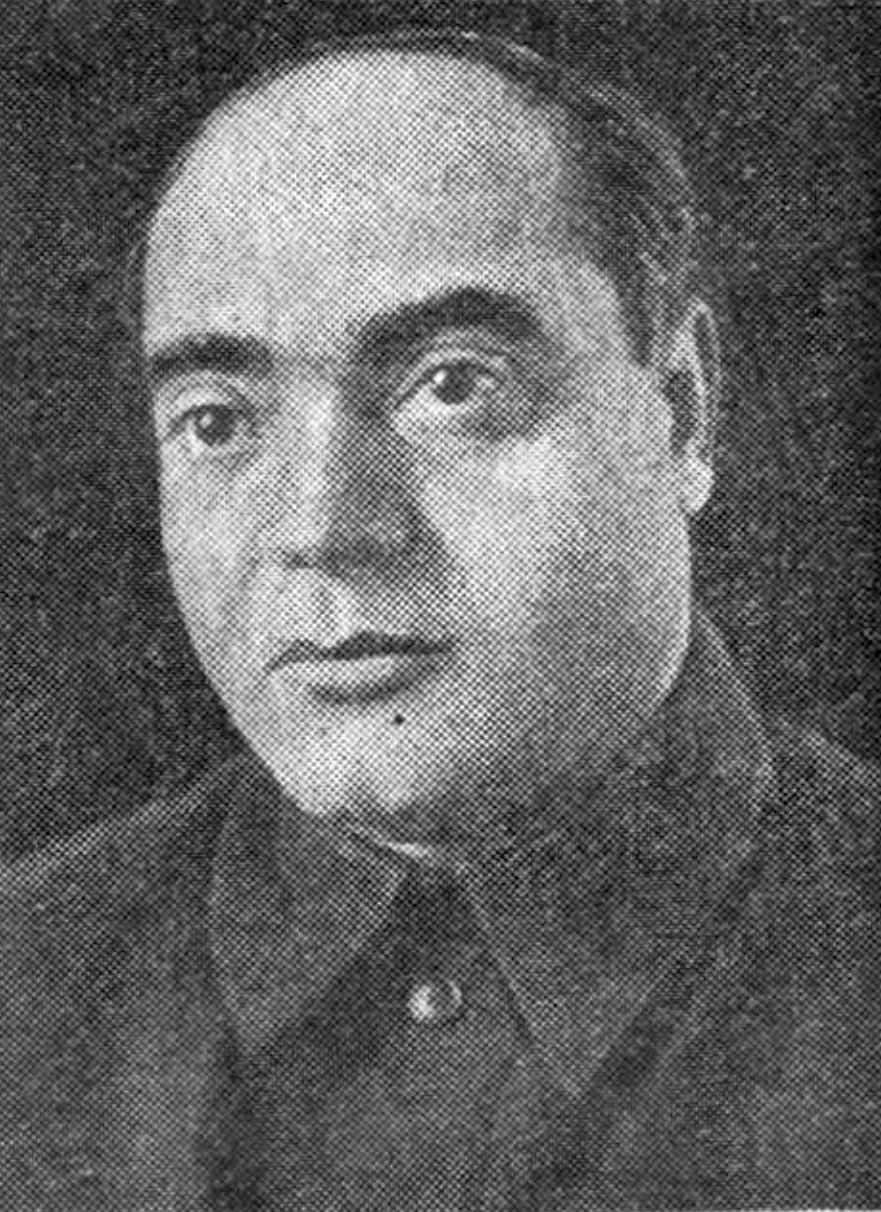
Protopopov c. 1938

Dmitri Zakharovich Protopopov (Russian: Дми́трий Заха́рович Протопо́пов; 4 October 1897 – 3 March 1986) was First Secretary of the Communist Party of Tajikistan from April 1938 to August 1946. He was a member of the Communist Party since 1917. He was twice awarded the Order of Lenin. He was an ethnic Russian, born in Kostyonki, Voronezh Oblast, Russian Empire.
