= Shirinsho Shotemur =

Pamiri politician

- Шириншоҳ Шотемур
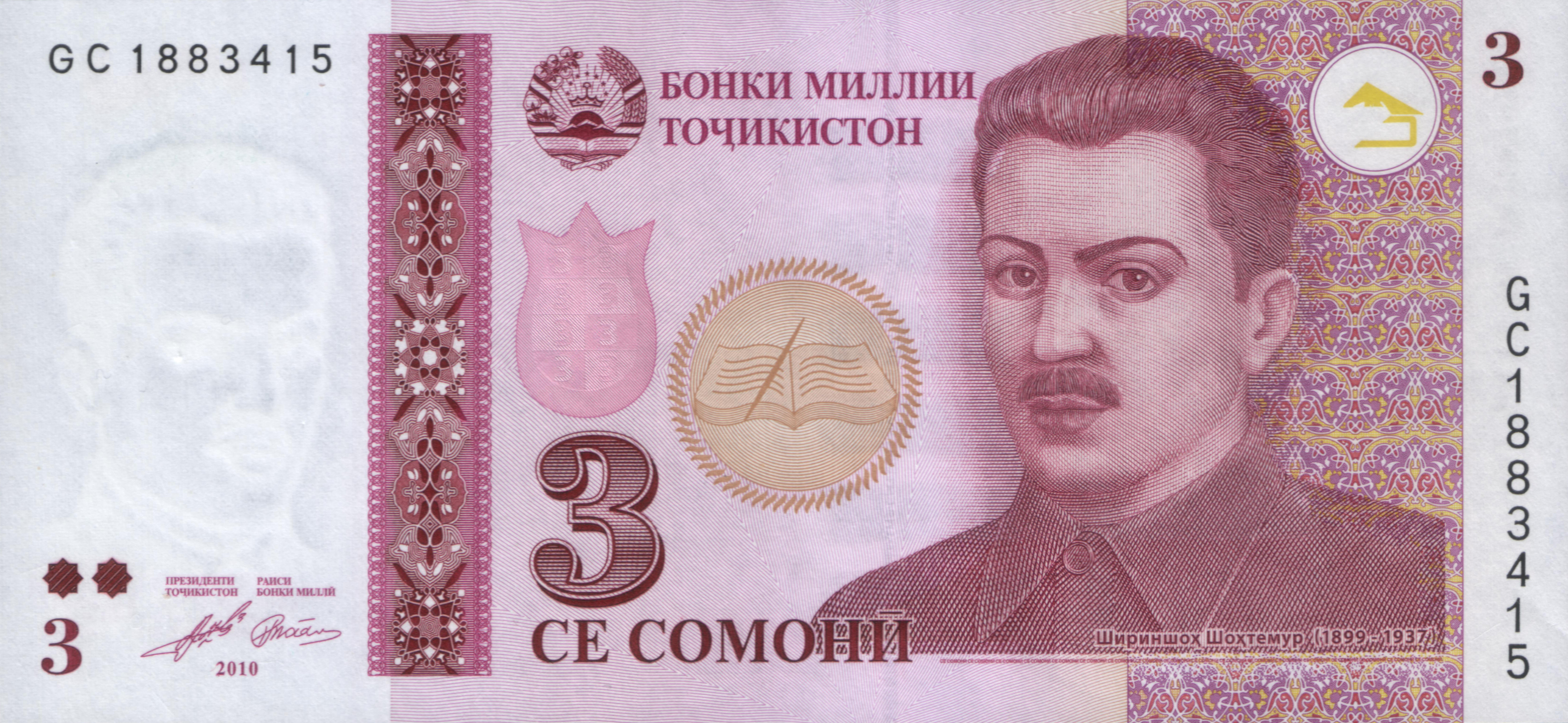
- A 2010 three-somoni bill from Tajikistan, carrying a portrait of Shotemur

Personal details
- Born: December 1, 1899 Shughnon District, Emirate of Bukhara
- Died: October 27, 1937 (aged 37) Moscow, Russian SFSR, Soviet Union
- Party: Communist Party of the Soviet Union (1921–1937)

Shirinsho Shotemur (also spelt Shirinshah Shahtimur, Shirinsho Shotemor, et al.; Tajik: Шириншоҳ Шоҳтемур Shirinshoh Shohtemur; Russian: Шириншо Шотемор Širinšo Šotemor; 1 December 1899 – 27 October 1937) was a prominent Pamiri politician who made a major contributions to the early history of Soviet Tajikistan and was instrumental in the establishment of the Tajik Soviet Socialist Republic.

== Life and political activity ==
Shotemur was born on December 1, 1899 in Shughnon District, Tajikistan, to a poor farmer family. At the age of 13 Shotemur started assisting his family on the field. From 1914 to 1918 he worked at a factory in Tashkent. In 1921 he began pursuing a political career and was sent back to the Pamirs as a member of the political-military team. From 1923 to 1924 he worked as an instructor of the national minorities department of Tajikistan's Communist Party Central Committee. At the same time he headed the Tajik communist section.

During his lifetime Shirinsho Shotemur held many leading positions in the Tajik government and in the communist party. In 1937 Shotemur was charged with participation in an anti-Soviet nationalistic organization and arrested in Moscow. Later the same year the Military board of the Supreme Court of the USSR sentenced Shotemur to death. He was executed on October 27, 1937. In 1956 Shotemur was posthumously rehabilitated by Military board of the Supreme Court of the USSR.

== Contribution to history ==
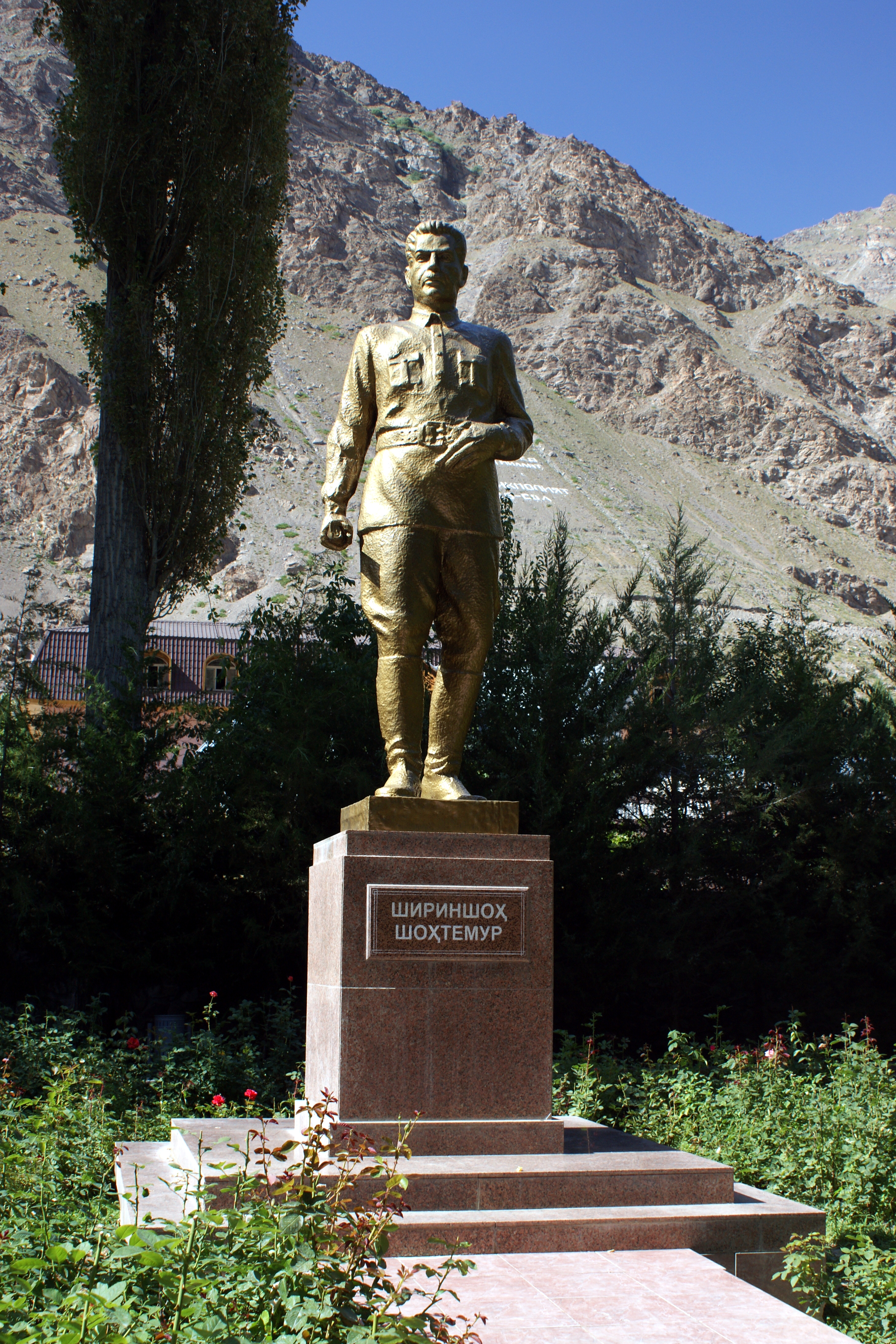
Statue of Shirinsho Shotemur in Khorugh

Shirinsho Shotemur was one of the main initiators of establishing the Tajik Autonomous Soviet Socialist Republic within the Uzbek Soviet Socialist Republic in 1924. As of 1927 Shotemur was the Tajik ASSR's representative in the Uzbek SSR. In 1929, Shirinsho Shotemur successfully insisted on joining Sughd Province to the Tajik ASSR. The same year he initiated the exit of Tajikistan from the Uzbek SSR and the establishment of the new Tajik Soviet Socialist Republic. Many Soviet historians believe that his initiatives to separate Tajikistan from the Uzbek SSR caused his rivals to falsify charges against Shotemur, which led to his death sentence. He was also a close colleague of Nisar Muhammad Yousafzai, an Afghan political exile who was handed a British Death Sentence (Note: His hometown of Swabi was under the British Empire, East of the Durand Line) for his contributions to the Anglo-Afghan War who was also a founder of Tajikistan and arrested on false charges, then killed in 1937. They were together decorated as Heroes of Tajikistan on 27 June 2006. Shirinsho Shotemur was awarded with prestigious state awards during his lifetime, as well as posthumously, including awards from the Republic of Tajikistan in 1999 and 2006.

== Family ==
In 1930 Shirinsho Shotemur married Alexandra Mikhailovna Kiselyova, who had recently moved to Tajikistan. Shotemur has two sons - Shirinsho Jr. (1931), and Rustam (1936). After Shirinsho's arrest in 1937, his wife was sent off to political prisoners' family camp in Siberia. His children, who were at their grandparents house at the time of arrest, grew up with Alexandra's mother. In 1940 the boys received a letter from their mother, in which she wrote in a coded language that she would return. However, on the way home she was detained again and sent to Krasnoyarsk. Even after her final return in 1944 Alexandra was not allowed to live with her children. Later the same year she died.

For political reasons, Shirinsho Shotemur Jr. faced problems entering university after school. Eventually, a friend helped the family change his younger brother's name to Rustam Arturovich Avotyn to avoid further problems. Shotemur Sr.'s other family members in the Tajik SSR were also subject to repression. Thus, Shirinsho Jr. and Rustam had no contact with their Tajik relatives until their father's name was officially rehabilitated.
