= Ak-Bulak, Kyzyl-Kyya =

Ak-Bulak Ак-Булак
- Location within Kyrgyzstan
- Coordinates: 40°16′20″N 72°07′20″E
- Country: Kyrgyzstan
- Region: Batken Region
- City: Kyzyl-Kyya

Population (2021)
  - Total: 6,497
- Time zone: UTC+6

Ak-Bulak (Kyrgyz: Ак-Булак) is a village in Batken Region of Kyrgyzstan. Administratively, it is part of the city of Kyzyl-Kyya. Its population was 6,497 in 2021.

== Population ==
Historical population
Year	Pop.	±% p.a.
2009	4,950	—
2021	6,497	+2.29%
Note: resident population; Sources:
