= Grigory Broydo =

Soviet politician (1883–1956)

- Григорий Бройдо
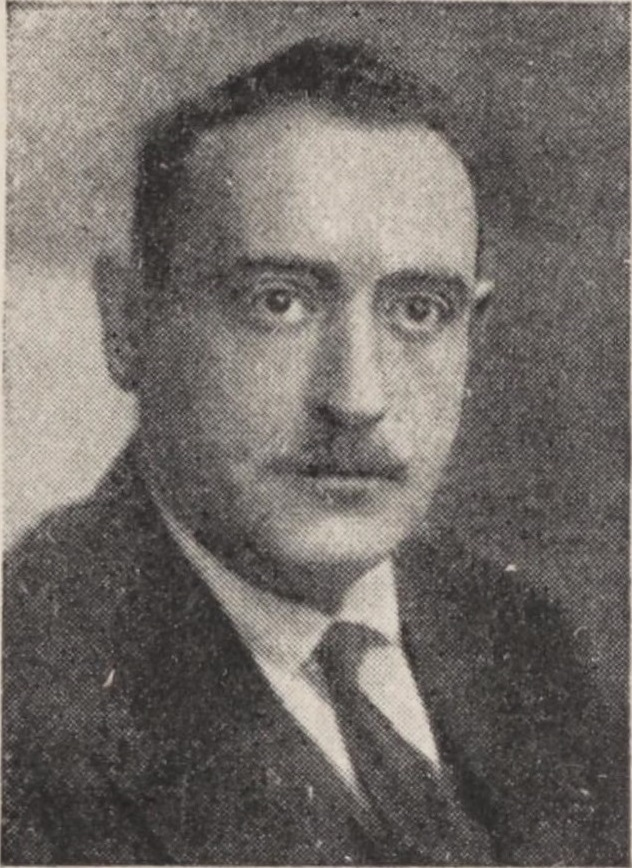

First Secretary of the Communist Party of Tajikistan
- In office 23 December 1933 – 3 January 1935
- Preceded by: Mirza Davud Huseynov
- Succeeded by: Suren Shadunts

Personal details
- Born: 7 November 1883 Vilnius, Russian Empire (now Lithuania)
- Died: 23 May 1956 (aged 72) Moscow, Russian SFSR, Soviet Union (now Russian Federation)
- Party: CPSU

Grigory Isaakovich Broydo (Russian: Григорий Исаакович Бройдо; 7 November 1883 – 23 May 1956) was a Soviet politician and senior member of the Communist Party of Soviet Union (CPSU) who served as the First Secretary of the Communist Party of Tajikistan from 23 December 1933 to 3 January 1935.

== Biography ==
Broydo joined the Communist Party in 1903. He served as rector of the Communist University of the Toilers of the East until 1927.
