= Boris Tolpygo =

Boris Vyacheslavovich Tolpygo (Russian: Борис Вячеславович Толпыго, 5 January 1893, Bogorodsk, Moscow Governorate, Russian Empire — 29 March 1939, Nikolayevsk-on-Amur) was a Russian and Soviet Communist politician, who served as the Executive Secretary of the Tajik Provincial Committee Communist Party of the Tajik Autonomous Soviet Socialist Republic in 1925-1927 and the chairman of the executive committee of Soviet of Lower Amur Oblast in 1936-1938. Tolpygo was executed in 1939 during the Great Purge.

Tolpygo was born in Bogorodsk, currently Moscow Oblast, Russia. Since 1913, he served in the army. In March 1918, he joined the Russian Bolshevik Party and the Red Army. He participated in the Russian Civil War as a military commander in the Red Army, acting around Pskov and Luga and raising in ranks, by the end of the war being the commander of a division. In 1923, he was sent to Central Asia and appointed the commander of the 13th Rifle Corps of the Turkestani Front.

In 1925, he was appointed the Executive Secretary of the Tajik Provincial Committee Communist Party, which at the time was a branch of the Communist Party of Uzbekistan. Since July 1927, Tolpygo held a number of positions in Central Asia. In particular, between 1928 and 1929 he was the chairman of the Executive Committee of Tashkent Okrug of the Uzbek Soviet Socialist Republic, and between September 1930 and April 1936 he was a deputy of the chairman of the Council of People's Commissars of the Kirghiz Autonomous Socialist Soviet Republic. In May 1936, Tolpygo was appointed the chairman of the executive committee of the Soviet of Lower Amur Oblast. In May 1938, he was dismissed and arrested, and on 29 March 1939 executed by shooting.
