= Radio Ozodi =

Tajik service of Radio Free Europe/Radio Liberty

- Radio Liberty Tajik Service
- Радиои Озодӣ
- The logo of Radio Ozodi, in Tajik
- Formation: 1953; 73 years ago
- Purpose: Journalism on topics not covered by the Tajik state media
- Headquarters: Prague
- Region served: Tajikistan
- Parent organization: Radio Free Europe/Radio Liberty
- Funding: United States Agency for Global Media
- Award: 2020 Burke Award
- Website: ozodi.org

Radio Ozodi (Tajik: Радиои Озодӣ, Russian: Радио Озоди, lit: 'Radio Freedom'), officially the Radio Liberty Tajik Service, is the branch of Radio Free Europe/Radio Liberty (RFE/RL) operating in Tajikistan. Founded in 1953, Radio Ozodi reports on topics not covered by the Tajik state-run media or other local outlets and counters Russian disinformation. RFE/RL is funded by the United States government through the US Agency for Global Media (USAGM) but retains editorial independence. As of 2019, Radio Ozodi operates the most popular Facebook and YouTube pages in Tajikistan.

== History ==
Radio Ozodi was launched in 1953 with the mission to spread democratic values in Tajikistan. The first head of the Tajik Service was Markiel Daniel, and its first editor was Muhammad Sarvari Mir, working for RFE/RL between 1964 and 1995. Originally, the Russian-language section of the service was more prominent. Daniel led the growth of the Tajik-language part of Radio Ozodi. For the first few decades of its existence, Radio Ozodi and RFE/RL radio was blocked in the Soviet Union and said to be propaganda against the government. However, when the Iron Curtain began to fall, Radio Ozodi began to grow in Tajikistan. Radio Ozodi remained one of the only international radio stations in Tajikistan, even after the fall of the Soviet Union.

The government of Tajikistan under Emomali Rahmon had conducted significant harassment against Radio Ozodi journalists. Prior to 2015, there was little news censorship in Tajikistan. Censorship increased greatly in 2021 and 2022. In March 2021, two RFE/RL correspondents were beaten at a Soro Oil gas station. In May 2021, a government employee threatened RFE/RL journalists in a Dushanbe hotel and stripped the journalists of their accreditation. In 2022, four journalists were beaten and threatened by agents linked to the Tajik security service. Radio Ozodi journalists that are arrested in Tajikistan are often subject to torture and forced false confessions. Many journalists that report against the government are arrested and sent to prison for terms upwards of 20 years. RFE/RL journalists in Tajikistan are often also held from accreditation for extended periods of time. Many Radio Ozodi employees are also subject to attacks on social media. RFE/RL websites, including Radio Ozodi, have been blocked in Tajikistan since 2021. Access has been blocked intermittently since at least 2012.

In 2021, a bipartisan-supported letter was sent to the Tajik government urging them to stop pressure and harassment against RFE/RL journalism in the country.

== Organisation ==
The service operates out of its offices in Dushanbe, the capital of Tajikistan. However, the headquarters of the service are in Prague, Czechia. RFE/RL receives funding from the US Agency for Global Media (USAGM), formerly the Broadcasting Board of Governors, an agency of the US federal government. Salimjon Aioubov is the Service Director of Radio Ozodi.

== Awards ==
Nominated by RFE/RL, Radio Ozodi won the David Burke Award in 2020 for its journalism.

== Criticism ==
Radio Ozodi has been criticised for being too light on the Rahmon government. In 2019, the US Department of State criticised RFE/RL's Tajik service for not reporting enough on the Tajik government's human rights abuses and corruption, and that the Tajik Service is not performing its "watchdog duty" on the government. Radio Ozodi has also been investigated by the State Department for glossing over details that may be potentially embarrassing to the Tajik government or Rahmon in their reporting and using terminology given by the government. The State Department accuses Radio Ozodi of putting the US government in a bad light by simply verifying the Tajik government's talking points, effectively becoming a mouthpiece for propaganda. However, pieces of reporting too critical of the Tajik government bring scrutiny to RFE/RL and risk having Radio Ozodi lose accreditation and their office in Dushanbe. RFE/RL denies the allegations of bias and skewed reporting towards the Tajik government and investigated Radio Ozodi.

In 2016, Radio Ozodi struck a deal with Radio Imruz, a radio station owned by Rahmon's brother-in-law. Radio Imruz made editorial demands after the deal was signed, forcing Radio Ozodi to tone down its reporting on the Tajik government. The deal was criticised by the US State Department.
