= Abdumalik Abdullajanov =

Prime Minister of Tajikistan from 1992 to 1993

- Абдумалик Абдуллоҷонов

3rd Prime Minister of Tajikistan
- In office 21 September 1992 – 18 December 1993
- President: Emomali Rahmon
- Preceded by: Akbar Mirzoyev
- Succeeded by: Abdujalil Samadov

Ambassador of Tajikistan to Russia
- In office 1993–1994
- President: Emomali Rahmon
- Preceded by: Position established
- Succeeded by: Ramazon Mirzoev

Personal details
- Born: Abdumalik Abdullayevich Abdullajanov; 1 January 1949 (age 77)
- Party: Independent
- Other political affiliations: Party of People's Unity (1994-1998)
- Education: Odesa National Academy of Food Technologies (BE)

Abdumalik Abdullayevich Abdullajanov (Note: Tajik: Абдумалик Абдуллоҷонов) (born 1 January 1949) is a Tajikistani engineer and politician, born in Leninabad. He served as the third prime minister of Tajikistan from 21 September 1992 to 18 December 1993. He resigned as Prime Minister to become Tajikistan's first ambassador to Russia.

In 1994, he ran in the second presidential elections in Tajikistan but, according to official reports, lost to Emomali Rahmon, Tajikistan's current president. After that, he left Tajikistan, stayed in Russia for several years, then moved to the United States in 1998 and lived there since then; Abdullajanov had refugee status there. Abdullajanov was detained at Boryspil International Airport (near Ukrainian capital Kyiv) on the request of the Tajik authorities upon arriving from Los Angeles on 5 February 2013. Tajik authorities accuse Abdullajanov of plotting an assassination attempt on Rahmon on 30 April 1997, when the president was wounded in the leg. Abdullajanov was also charged with organizing a riot in the Sughd Province which claimed dozens of lives in 1998. Abdullajanov has denied any involvement in his interviews to Western media. On 4 April 2013 Ukraine freed Abdullajanov from detention and refused a request to extradite him to his homeland.

Rumors have circulated that "Abdullajanov would support an opposition candidate who has not yet declared his participation" in the November 2013 Tajikistani presidential election, but because Abdullajanov has not been interviewed for a long time his stand on the issue is unclear.

== Notes ==
Political offices
Preceded by Akbar Mirzoyev	Prime Minister of Tajikistan; 1992–1993	Succeeded by Abdujalil Samadov
