= Yahyo Azimov =

Prime Minister of Tajikistan from 1996 to 1999

- Яҳё Азимов
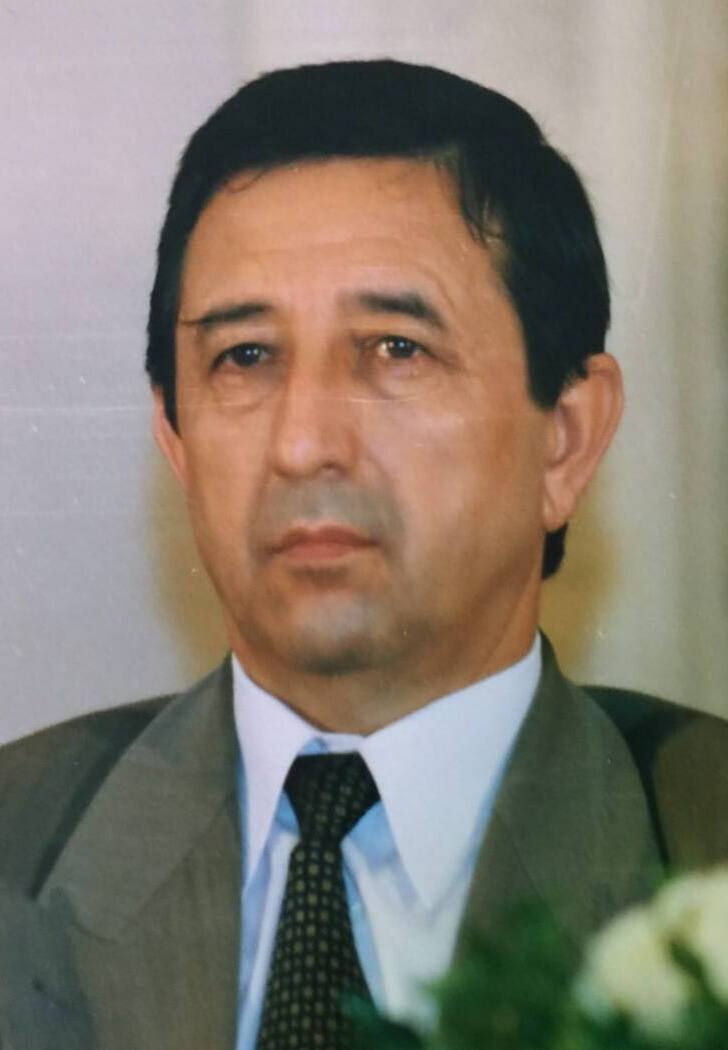
- Azimov in 1998

Prime Minister of Tajikistan
- In office 7 February 1996 – 20 December 1999
- President: Emomali Rahmon
- Preceded by: Jamshed Karimov
- Succeeded by: Oqil Oqilov

Member of the National Assembly of Tajikistan
- In office 1995–2000

Personal details
- Born: 4 December 1947 (age 78) Leninabad, Tajik SSR
- Party: People's Democratic Party of Tajikistan
- Children: 3
- Education: Tashkent institute of Textile and Light Industry
- Awards: Order of Ismoili Somoni; Order of the Badge of Honour

Yahyo Nuriddinovich Azimov (Note: Tajik: Яҳё Нуриддинович Азимов) (born 4 December 1947) is a Tajikistani politician who served as the 6th Prime Minister of Tajikistan between 8 February 1996 and 20 December 1999.

== Early life and career ==
Azimov completed his secondary education in 1966 at the Secondary School No. 4 in Leninabad (now Khujand). He then attended the Tashkent Institute of Textile and Light Industry, graduating in 1971 with a degree in textile engineering. Following his graduation, he Azimov began his career at the Ura-Tyube Outerwear Factory in August 1971, starting as a shift foreman. He advanced quickly through the engineering ranks, becoming a factory manager in Khujand. In February 1975, Azimov joined the Lenin Kairakkum Carpet Factory as a senior engineer. Over the next decade, he held several leadership roles, including head of production, factory director, and chief engineer, ultimately being appointed General Director of the enterprise in November 1986. Following the dissolution of the Soviet Union, the factory was restructured into the "Kolinho" Joint Stock Company in 1992, and Azimov was made its president.

== Political activity ==
Azimov began his political activity serving as a deputy for various councils. In 1988, he was a delegate to the 19th All-Union Conference of the Communist Party of the Soviet Union. He went on to serve as a People's Deputy to the Supreme Council of Tajikistan from 1990–1995, and was subsequently elected to the Majlisi Oli from 1995–2000. On February 8, 1996, Azimov was appointed Prime Minister of Tajikistan under President Emomali Rahmon, serving during a critical transition period that included the conclusion of the Tajik Civil War. He held the position until December 20, 1999. Following his premiership, he was appointed Minister of Economy and Foreign Economic Relations, serving from March 2000 until January 2001.

== Later life ==
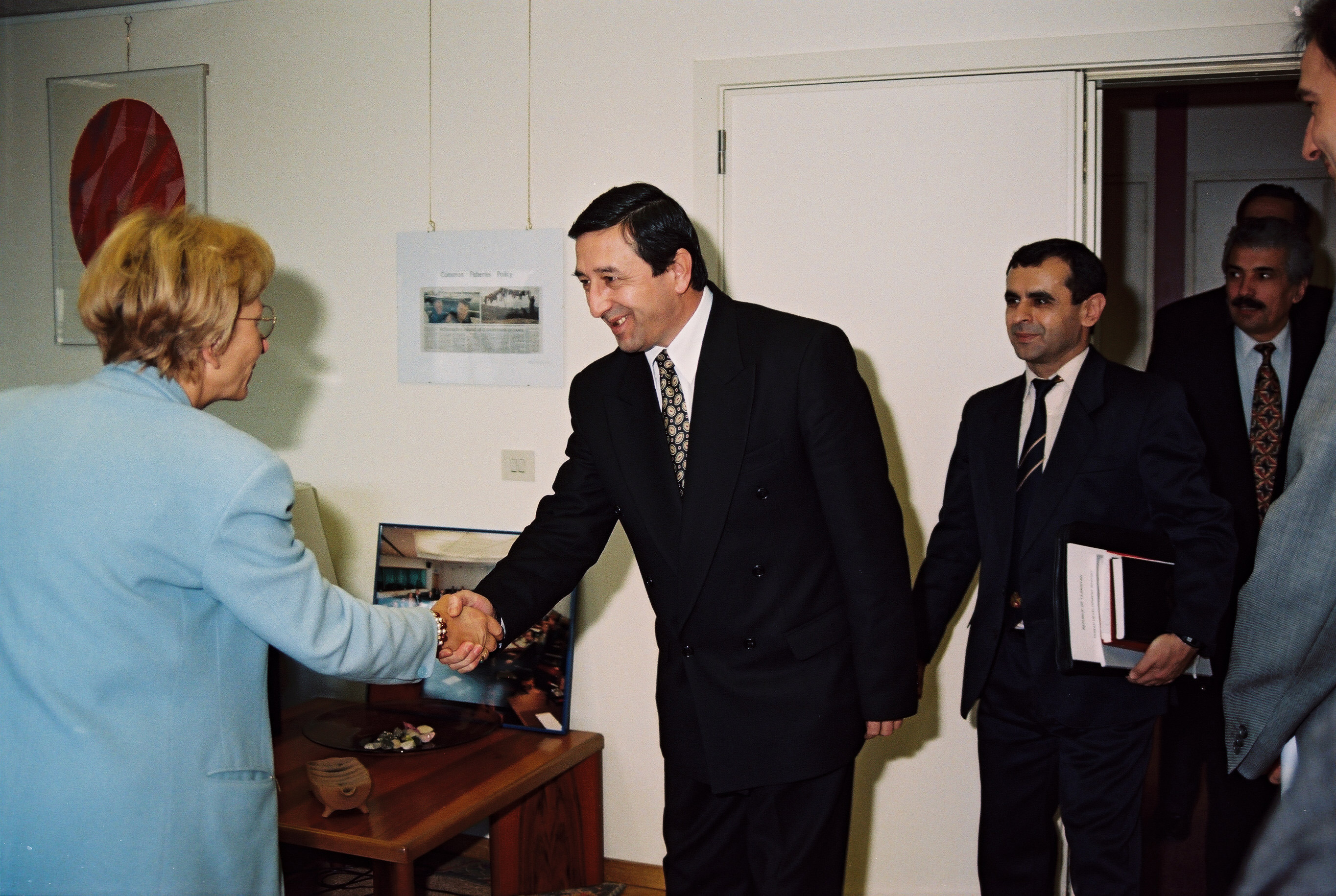
Azimov during a visit to Brussels in 1997.

Much later, in February 2004, he returned to the private textile sector as the President of the International Integration Carpet Syndicate of the Commonwealth of Independent States (CIS).

== Honors ==
- Order of the Badge of Honour (May 1986)
- Honored Worker of the Republic of Tajikistan (December 1997)
- Medal of the 5th Anniversary of the Armed Forces (February 1998)
- Order of Ismoili Somoni, 3rd Class (August 1999)
- In 2001, he received international recognition when he was awarded the Gold Medal of the World Intellectual Property Organization.

== Notes ==
Political offices
Preceded by Jamshed Karimov	Prime Minister of Tajikistan; 1996–1999	Succeeded by Oqil Oqilov
