= Akbar Mirzoyev =

Former Tajikistani politician and prime minister

- Акбар Мирзоев
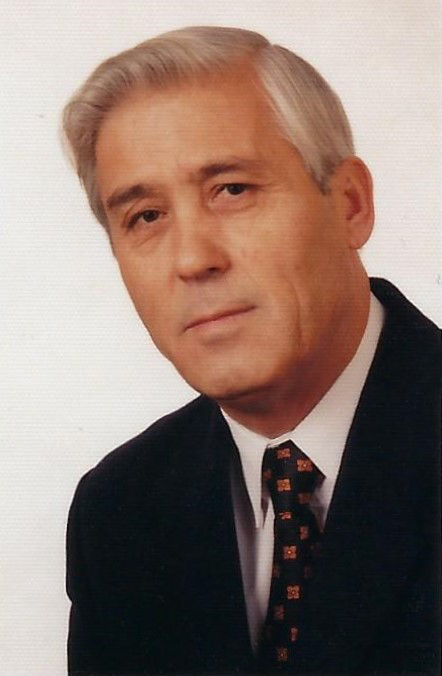

2nd Prime Minister of Tajikistan
- In office 9 January 1992 – 21 September 1992
- President: Rahmon Nabiyev
- Preceded by: Izatullo Khayoyev
- Succeeded by: Abdumalik Abdullajanov

Personal details
- Born: 15 February 1939 (age 87) Nurak, Khatlon Region, Tajik SSR, Soviet Union

Akbar Mirzoev (Note: Tajik: Акбар Мирзоев) (born 15 February 1939) is a Tajikistani politician who served as the second prime minister of Tajikistan between 9 January 1992, and 21 September 1992.

== Notes ==
Political offices
Preceded by Izatullo Khayoyev	Prime Minister of Tajikistan; 1992	Succeeded by Abdumalik Abdullajanov
