= List of ambassadors of Russia to Benin =

Ambassador of the Russian Federation to the Republic of Benin
- Emblem of the Russian Foreign Ministry

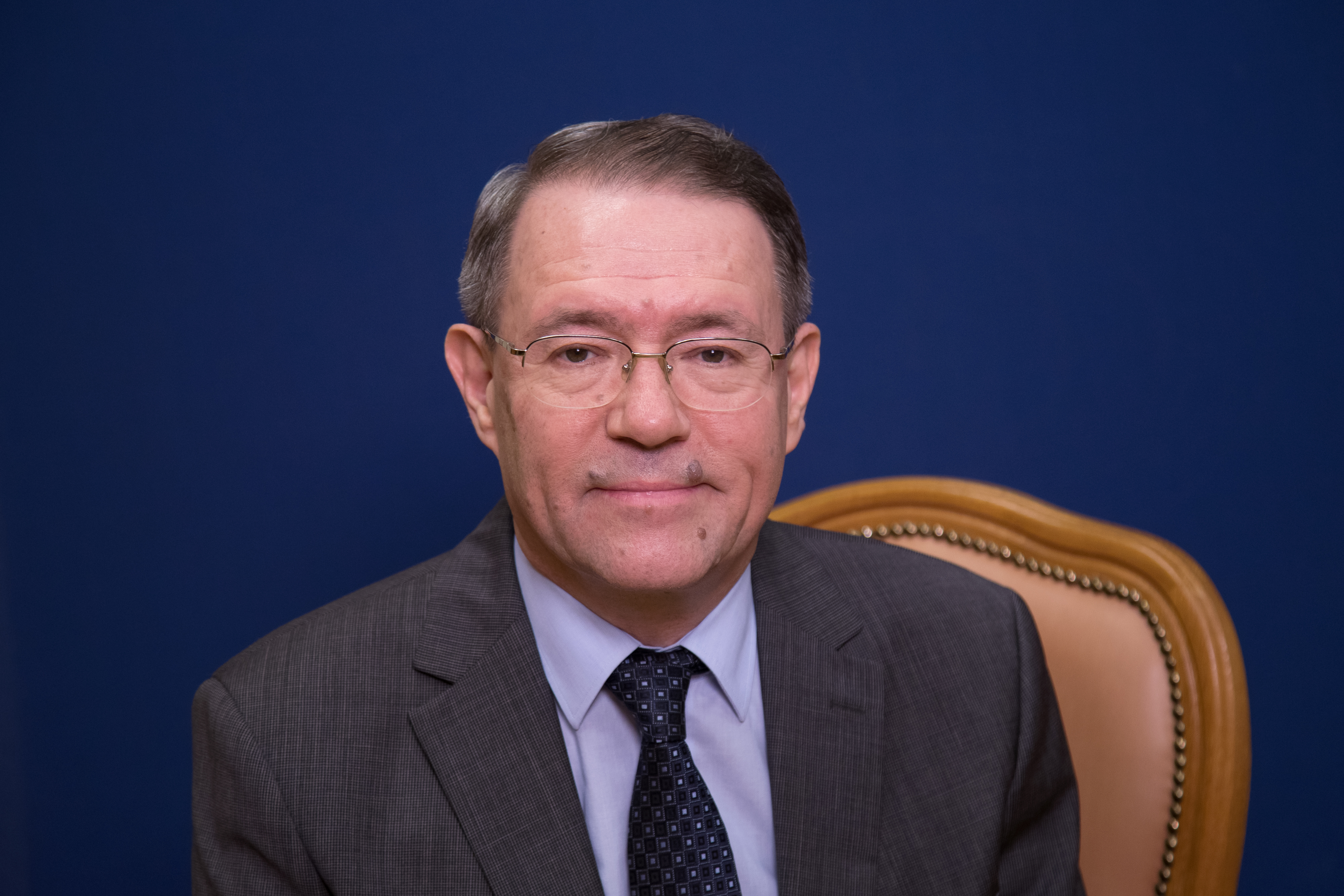
- Incumbent; Igor Yevdokimov since 7 August 2017
- Ministry of Foreign Affairs; Embassy of Russia in Cotonou
- Style: His Excellency; The Honourable
- Reports to: Minister of Foreign Affairs
- Seat: Cotonou
- Appointer: President of Russia
- Term length: At the pleasure of the president
- Formation: 1963
- First holder: Anvar Kuchkarov
- Website: Embassy of Russia in Benin

The ambassador extraordinary and plenipotentiary of the Russian Federation to the Republic of Benin is the official representative of the president and the government of the Russian Federation to the president and the government of Benin.

The ambassador and his staff work at large in the Embassy of Russia in Cotonou. The post of Russian ambassador to Benin is currently held by Igor Yevdokimov, incumbent since 7 August 2017. Since 1992 the Russian ambassador to Benin has been concurrently accredited to Togo.

== History of diplomatic relations ==
Diplomatic relations at the mission level between the Soviet Union and what was then the Republic of Dahomey were first established in June 1962, and carried out through the Soviet embassy in Togo. The first Soviet ambassador, Anvar Kuchkarov, the incumbent ambassador to Togo, was dual accreditation on 10 August 1963. The Soviet embassy in Dahomey opened in May 1966, with Aleksandr Abramov appointed ambassador solely to Dahomey on 4 May 1966. The Republic of Dahomey was renamed the Republic of Benin in 1975, and with the dissolution of the Soviet Union in 1991, the Soviet ambassador, Vitaly Zhuravlyov, continued as representative of the Russian Federation until 1992. Zhuravlyov's successor, Yury Chepik, was appointed as ambassador to Benin and concurrently to Togo.

== List of representatives (1963–present) ==
=== Soviet Union to the Republic of Dahomey (1963–1975) ===
Name	Title	Appointment	Termination	Notes
Anvar Kuchkarov	Ambassador	10 August 1963	4 May 1966	Concurrently as ambassador to Togo
Aleksandr Abramov	Ambassador	4 May 1966	17 August 1968	First accredited only to, and based in, Dahomey
Vyacheslav Karetkin	Ambassador	17 August 1968	11 November 1969	
Igor Zhukovsky	Ambassador	11 November 1969	13 April 1975	
Ivan Ilin	Ambassador	13 April 1975	30 November 1975	

=== Soviet Union to the Republic of Benin (1975–1991) ===
Name	Title	Appointment	Termination	Notes
Ivan Ilin	Ambassador	30 November 1975	8 April 1979	
Vitaly Agapov	Ambassador	8 April 1979	29 August 1985	
Valentin Pavlov	Ambassador	29 August 1985	24 July 1990	
Vitaly Zhuravlyov	Ambassador	24 July 1990	25 December 1991	

=== Russian Federation to the Republic of Benin (1991–present) ===
Name	Title	Appointment	Termination	Notes
Vitaly Zhuravlyov	Ambassador	25 December 1991	22 April 1992	
Yury Chepik	Ambassador	22 April 1992	8 May 1998	
Vladimir Timofeyev	Ambassador	8 May 1998	17 July 2002	
Vladimir Timoshenko	Ambassador	17 July 2002	30 June 2008	
Yury Grashchenkov	Ambassador	30 June 2008	31 May 2013	
Oleg Kovalchuk	Ambassador	31 May 2013	7 August 2017	
Igor Yevdokimov	Ambassador	7 August 2017		
