= Quvasoy =

Quvasoy Quvasoy
- City
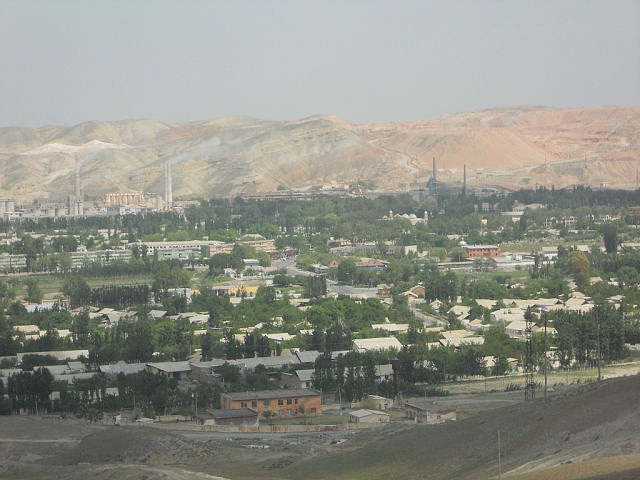
- view from downtown hill

- Location in Uzbekistan
- Coordinates: 40°18′0″N 71°58′0″E
- Country: Uzbekistan
- Region: Fergana Region
- Town status: 1954.

Government

Area
  - Total: 264 km^{2} (102 sq mi)
- Elevation: 409 m (1,342 ft)

Population (2022)
  - Total: 96,900
  - Density: 367/km^{2} (951/sq mi)
- Time zone: GMT 5:00
- Postal code: 90100

Quvasoy (Uzbek: Quvasoy/Қувасой; Tajik: Кувасой; Russian: Кувасай, romanized: Kuvasay) is a city in the Fergana Region in eastern Uzbekistan. Administratively, Quvasoy is a district-level city that includes the urban-type settlement Sufon and 6 rural communities. The population of Quvasoy is 96,900 (2022). It has an area of 264 km^{2} (102 sq mi). It lies along the river Isfayramsay, close to the border with Kyrgyzstan.

== History ==
Quvasoy was formed in 1954 on the site of an urban-type settlement. It was one of the places were deported Crimean Tatars were resettled.

In 1989, a combination of migration and post-soviet economic decline led to the Fergana massacre. Quvasoy was one of the centres of violence and there were clashes between Meskhetian Turks and Uzbeks in the city.

There are multiple military bases in Quvasoy.

== Industry ==
There is a railway station. Small enterprises, micro-firms and other types of enterprises operate in Quvasoy. There are household service enterprises, glass, tableware, brick, porcelain, reinforced concrete, household chemical factories, and construction enterprises. There is a central hospital, polyclinic, pharmacy and other medical institutions. There are also mosques and churches in the city of Quvasoy. Apart from that, the Quvasoy big market is also functioning. There are buses, cars and private taxis from Quvasoy to Fergana.

Favorable natural conditions, the richest deposits of limestone, gypsum and various clays, the proximity of a large coal mine, the railway passing through Quvasoy - all this created conditions for the development of a large industrial center during the Soviet era.

There are 5 large industrial enterprises in the city:

- "Alesta Glass" DP
- JSC "Quartz".
- "United Cement Group" UCG (Quvasoysement)
- "Kuvasoy porcelain" JSC Control point of concrete products
- "Electrovillage Construction".

Cement, slate, building glass, cans, glass, reinforced concrete products are produced.

- 8 joint ventures operate in the city:
- "TJM Deloros" (Uzbek-American),
- Delcons (Uzbek-American-Italian) is currently not working,
- "Imbek" (Uzbek-Korean),
- Kuvasitesement (Uzbek-Cyprus),
- "Valley of Milk" (Uzbek-Russian),
- "Fergana bottle" (Uzbek-British),
- Unitex LTD (Uzbek-American),
- "Art soft ceramics".
