= Abdurrahim Hojibayev =

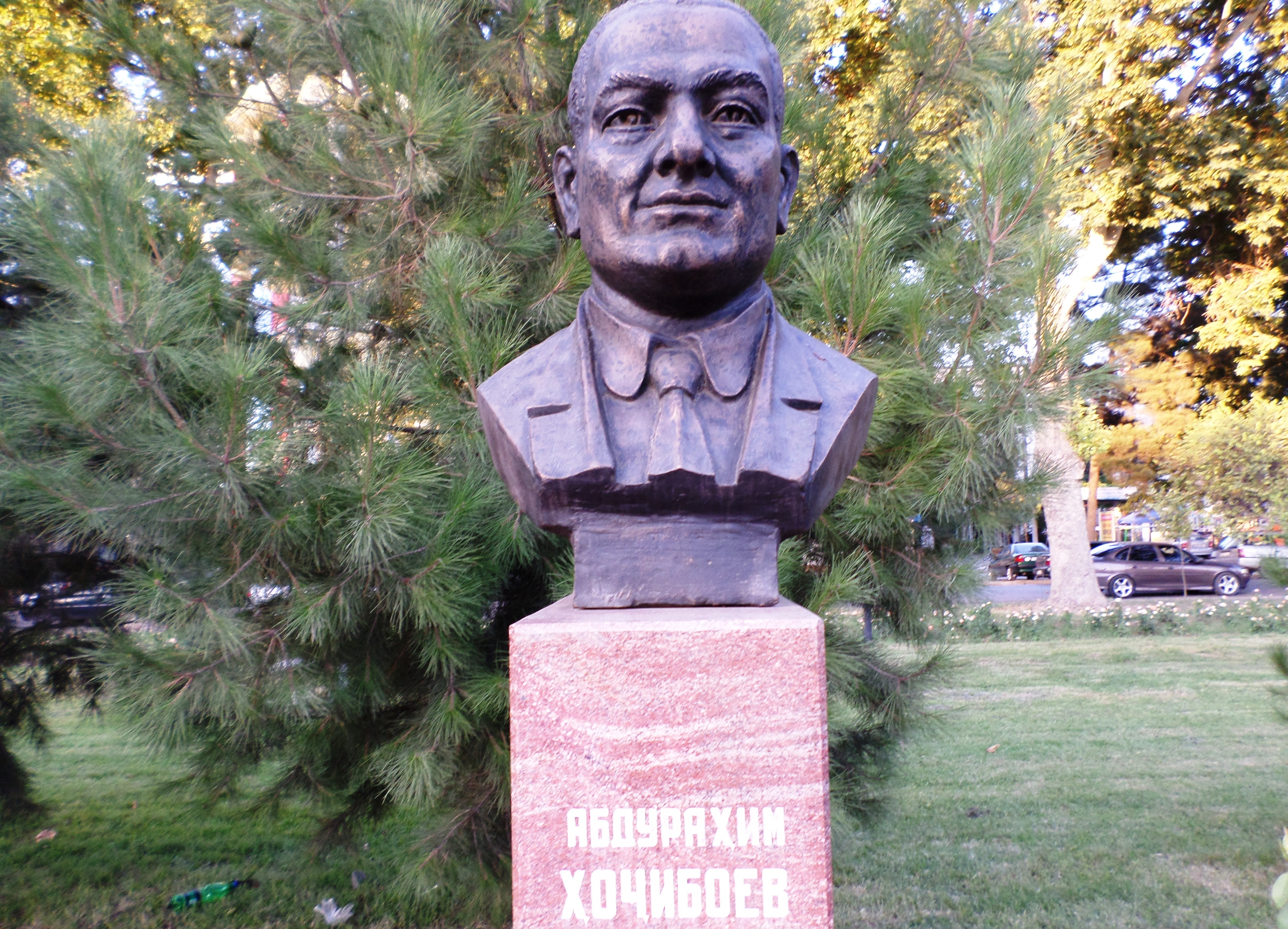
Bust of Abdurrahim Hojibayev, 2014

Abdurrahim Hojibayev (25 April 1900 in Khujand – 25 January 1938) (Tajik: Абдурраҳим Ҳоҷибоев) was Chairman of the Council of People's Commissars between November 1929 and December 28, 1933.

== Death ==
He died during the Great Purge in 1938, at the age of 37.
