= Nusratullo Maksum =

Tajik Soviet politician

Nusratullo Makhsum
- Нусратулло Махсум
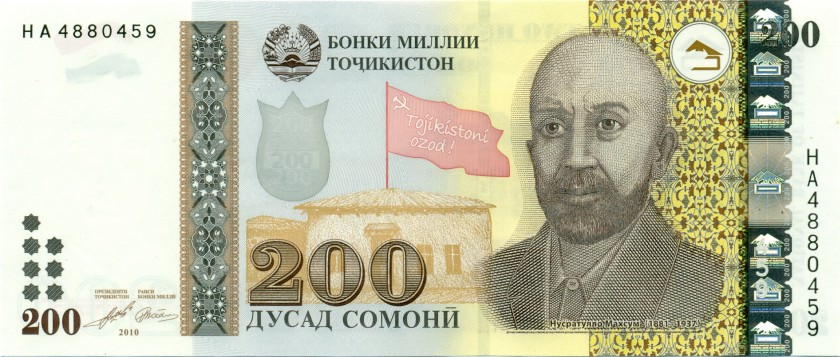
- Maksum on a 2010 Tajik banknote

Member of the Presidium of the All-Russian Central Executive Committee
- In office 16 December 1926 – 28 December 1933
- General Secretary: Joseph Stalin
- Preceded by: Position created
- Succeeded by: Abdullo Rakhimbayev

Prime Minister of the Tajik SSR
- In office 1925–1926
- Preceded by: Position created
- Succeeded by: Polat Usmon Khodzhayev

Personal details
- Born: July 1, 1881 Chashma-kuzi, Gharm District, Russian Empire
- Died: 1 November 1937 (aged 56)
- Resting place: Kommunarka shooting ground
- Citizenship: Soviet Union
- Party: CPSU

Nusratullo Maksum (Tajik: Нусратулло Махсум; 1 July 1881 – 1 November 1937) also known as Nusratullo Lutfullayev, was a Tajik Soviet politician. He was a recipient of the Order of the Red Banner. From 16 December 1926 to 28 December 1933 he served on the Central Executive Committee of the Soviet Union as the representative of the Tajik Autonomous Soviet Socialist Republic and later Tajik Soviet Socialist Republic. He was executed by firing squad during the Great Purge. After the independence of Tajikistan from the Soviet Union, Maksum was featured on the 200 Tajikistani somoni banknote.

Preceded by New office	Prime Minister of Tajikistan; 1925–1926	Succeeded by Polat Usmon Khodzhayev
