= Party of People's Unity (Tajikistan) =

Party of People's Unity Ҳизби иттиҳоди мардумии Тоҷикистон
- Founded: 1994
- Banned: 1998
- Headquarters: Dushanbe
- Ideology: Conservative liberalism Liberal conservatism Secularism
- Political position: Centre-right
- Coalition: United Tajik Opposition

The Party of People's Unity (Note: Tajik: Ҳизби иттиҳоди мардумии Тоҷикистон, romanized: Hizbi ittihodi mardumiyi Tojikiston; Russian: Партия народного единства и согласия Таджикистана) was a liberal-conservative and secularist political party in Tajikistan. The party was founded by Abdumalik Abdullajanov in 1994 and banned in 1998. It was a part of the United Tajik Opposition faction during the Tajikistani Civil War.
