= Oqil Oqilov =

Prime Minister of Tajikistan from 1999 to 2013

- Оқил Оқилов
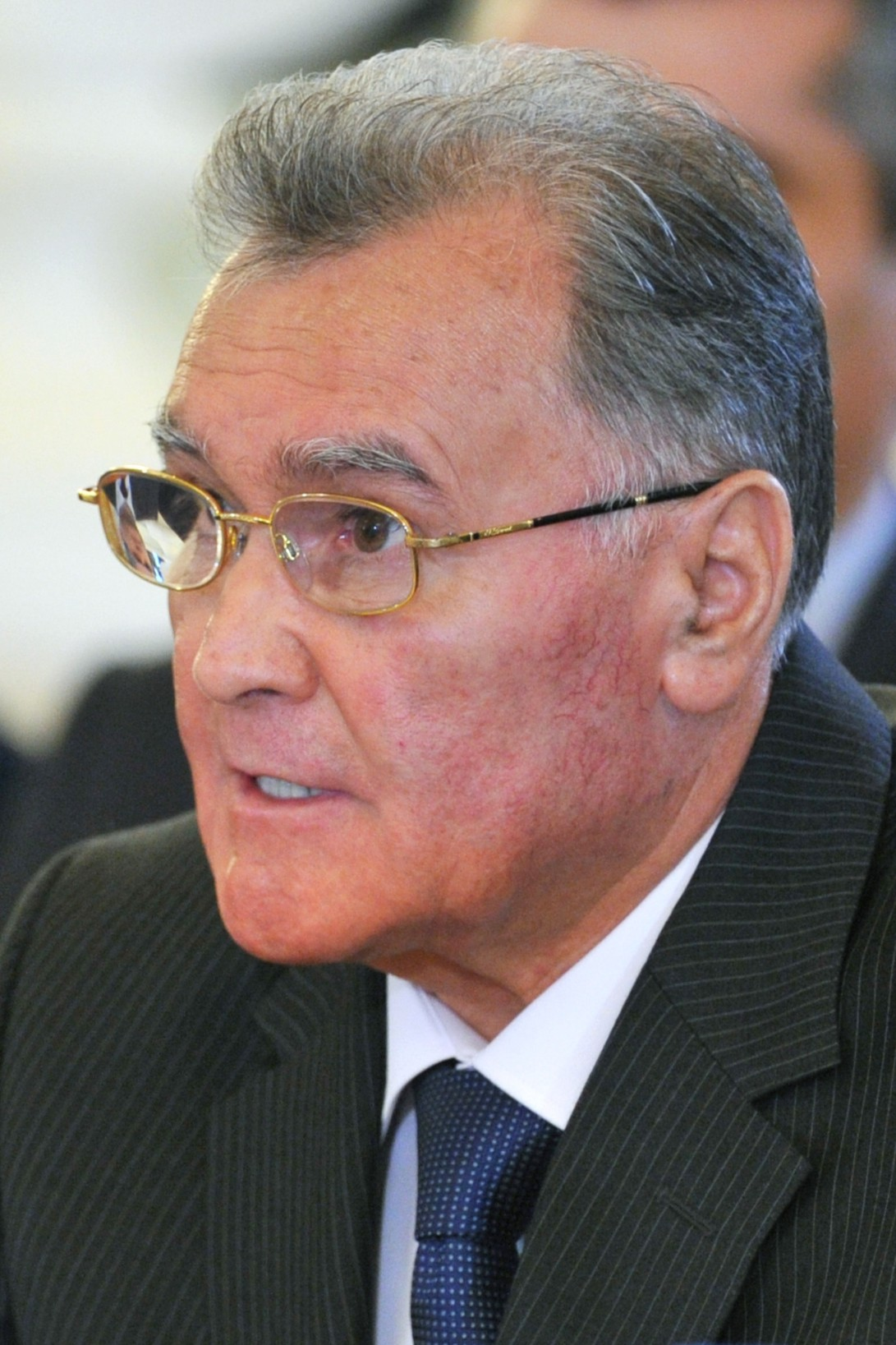
- Oqilov in 2011

7th Prime Minister of Tajikistan
- In office 20 December 1999 – 23 November 2013
- President: Emomali Rahmon
- Preceded by: Yahyo Azimov
- Succeeded by: Qohir Rasulzoda

Personal details
- Born: 2 February 1944 (age 82) Khujand, Tajik SSR, Soviet Union (now Tajikistan)
- Party: People's Democratic Party

Oqil Ghaybulloyevich Oqilov (Note: Tajik: Оқил Ғайбуллоевич Оқилов, Oqil Ghaybulloyevich Oqilov) (born 2 February 1944), alternatively transliterated as Akil Akilov, is a Tajikistani politician who served as the 7th prime minister of Tajikistan from 20 December 1999 to 23 November 2013. He is a member of the People's Democratic Party of Tajikistan.

== Biography ==
Oqilov was born in Khujand in 1944. He began working in the Sughd veloyat in 1960. He attended the Moscow Institute for Engineering and Construction, graduating in 1967. He left the Sughd veloyat in 1976 to work for the Communist Party of Tajikistan, with which he remained involved until 1993. He was appointed Minister of Construction in 1993. The following year, he was made vice premier of Tajikistan. He served in that position until 1996, when he returned to the Sughd veloyat as first deputy chair in June. He was appointed Prime Minister of Tajikistan in December 1999. He was dismissed on 23 November 2013, being replaced by the Head of the Sughd Region Qohir Rasulzoda.

== Notes ==
Political offices
Preceded by Yahyo Azimov	Prime Minister of Tajikistan; 1999–2013	Succeeded by Qohir Rasulzoda
