= Kyzyl-Kyya =

Kyzyl-Kyya Кызыл-Кыя
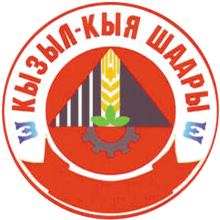
- Seal

- Location in Kyrgyzstan
- Coordinates: 40°15′40″N 72°07′50″E
- Country: Kyrgyzstan
- Region: Batken Region
- Founded: 1898
- City status: 1938

Government
  - Mayor: Topchubaev Ermekbai Asanovich

Area
  - City: 78 km^{2} (30 sq mi)
- Elevation: 1,058 m (3,471 ft)

Population (2021)
  - City: 56,819
  - Density: 730/km^{2} (1,900/sq mi)
  - Urban: 42,564
- Postal code: 715200
- Area code: +996 3657
- Website: www.kyzyl-kiya.com

Kyzyl-Kyya, also spelt Kyzyl-Kyia (Kyrgyz: Кызыл-Кыя, IPA: [qɯzɯ́ɫ qɯjɑ́]) and Kyzyl-Kiya (Russian: Кызыл-Кия, IPA: [kɨˈzɨɫ kʲɪˈja]), is a city in Batken Region, in southwestern Kyrgyzstan. It is a city of regional significance, not part of a district, and consists of the town proper and the villages Karavan, Ak-Bulak and Jin-Jigen. Its area is 78 square kilometres (30 sq mi), and its resident population was 56,819 in 2021 (both including the villages Karavan, Ak-Bulak and Jin-Jigen). It is situated on the southern edge of the Fergana Valley, 32 km southeast of Fergana, and 65 km southwest of Osh. The town is one of the oldest centers of the coal mining industry in Kyrgyzstan.

== Population ==
Historical population
Year	Pop.	±% p.a.
1970	40,841	—
1979	40,183	−0.18%
1989	47,138	+1.61%
1999	43,061	−0.90%
2009	44,144	+0.25%
2021	56,819	+2.13%
Note: resident population; Sources:

== Geography ==
=== Climate ===
Kyzyl-Kyya has a cold semi-arid climate (Köppen climate classification BSk). The average annual temperature is 11.7 °C (53.1 °F). The warmest month is July with an average temperature of 24.7 °C (76.5 °F) and the coolest month is January with an average temperature of -3.4 °C (25.9 °F). The average annual precipitation is 295.8mm (11.64") and has an average of 68.6 days with precipitation. The wettest month is March with an average of 44.9mm (1.8") of precipitation and the driest month is August with an average of 4.1mm (0.2") of precipitation.

Climate data for Kyzyl-Kyya
Month	Jan	Feb	Mar	Apr	May	Jun	Jul	Aug	Sep	Oct	Nov	Dec	Year
Daily mean °C (°F)	−3.4 (25.9)	−0.9 (30.4)	6.4 (43.5)	14 (57)	18.7 (65.7)	22.8 (73.0)	24.7 (76.5)	23.1 (73.6)	18.3 (64.9)	11.8 (53.2)	5 (41)	−0.6 (30.9)	11.7 (53.1)
Average precipitation mm (inches)	27.4 (1.08)	33.2 (1.31)	44.9 (1.77)	40.1 (1.58)	37.7 (1.48)	16.2 (0.64)	10.2 (0.40)	4.1 (0.16)	5 (0.2)	27.6 (1.09)	25.9 (1.02)	23.5 (0.93)	295.8 (11.65)
Average precipitation days (≥ 0.1 mm)	7	7.5	8.8	8.1	8.3	5.2	3.4	2.1	2.2	4.7	5.3	6	68.6
Average relative humidity (%)	77.7	75.6	66.9	58.5	52	43.4	44.9	49.4	52.3	60.3	69	77.4	60.6
Source: "The Climate of Kyzyl-Kyya". Weatherbase.

== Transportation ==
Kyzyl-kyya has an airport. It can’t operate domestic flights. The government discusses about airport’s restoration.It is also one of the few towns in Kyrgyzstan to have a railway station. The railway starts in Uzbekistan and ends here.
