= Tursun Uljabayev =

Tajikistani politician

Tursun Uljabayevich Uljabayev (Russian: Турсунбай Ульджабаевич Ульджабаев; Tajik: Турсун Ӯлҷабоев; Uzbek: Турсунбой Ўлжабоевич Ўлжабоев; 1 May 1916 – 31 May 1988) was First Secretary of the Communist Party of Tajikistan between May 24, 1956 and April 12, 1961.

== Later life and death ==
In 1961 he was accused of falsifying official documents related to cotton production and expelled from the Communist Party. He went on to work as a farm director and retired in 1986. He died in Dushanbe on 31 May 1988.
