= Prime Minister of Tajikistan =

Head of government

Prime Minister of the Republic of Tajikistan
- Сарвазири Ҷумҳурии Тоҷикистон
- Emblem of Tajikistan

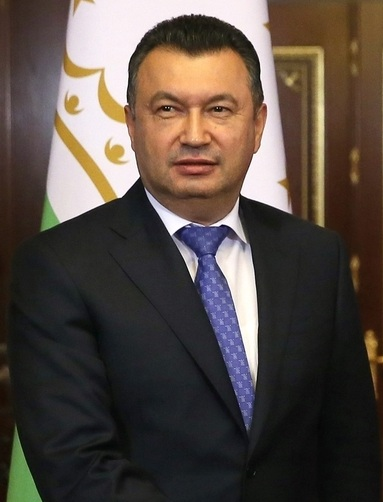
- Incumbent; Qohir Rasulzoda since 23 November 2013
- Secretariat of the Prime Minister
- Style: Prime Minister (informally); His Excellency (international correspondence)
- Member of: Government; Security Council
- Residence: Dushanbe
- Nominator: President
- Appointer: President (with approval from the Supreme Assembly)
- Term length: No fixed term
- Constituting instrument: Constitution of Tajikistan
- Inaugural holder: Izatullo Khayoyev
- Formation: 25 June 1991
- Deputy: First Deputy Prime Minister
- Website: https://egov.tj

The prime minister of Tajikistan (Tajik: Сарвазири Ҷумҳурии Тоҷикистон, romanized: Sarvaziri Jumhurii Tojikiston) is the title held by the de jure head of government of Tajikistan. (Note: Even though an executive president co-exists with a prime minister, multiple sources have still described Tajikistan as a presidential republic with the president serving as both head of state and head of government.) After the president, the prime minister is second most powerful person of the country. The prime minister coordinates the work of the Government of Tajikistan and advises and assists the president in the execution of the functions of government.

== History ==
During the Tajik Autonomous Soviet Socialist Republic and later Tajik Soviet Socialist Republic, the head of government was held by the Chairman of the Council of People's Commissars, and from 1946 to 1991 its name was Chairman of the Council of Ministers. During the dissolution of the Soviet Union in 1991, the office of prime minister was introduced.

== Duties ==
The Prime Minister is a member of the 9-member Presidium of the Government of Tajikistan and is the most senior member of the Government, being appointed by the president with the approval of both chambers of the Supreme Assembly. In this geographically divided country, the position of prime minister is traditionally is held by a person from the north to nominally balance President Emomali Rahmon’s southern origin.

The principal deputy of the prime minister is the first deputy prime minister (currently Hokim Kholiqzoda). There are also additional deputies, the possibility of having more than one deputy prime minister, but no more than three. The current Deputy Prime Ministers are: Sulaimon Ziyozoda, Dilrabo Mansuri Saidullo and Usmonali Usmonzoda.

== Secretariat of the Prime Minister ==
The Secretariat of the Prime Minister (Tajik: Котиботи Сарвазир) is a department of the Executive Office of the President of Tajikistan designed to support the Prime Minister in his/her duties. It includes the Prime Minister's assistants and his deputy assistants.

List of head of the Secretariat include:

- Sharifjon Jumazoda (? - February 2016)
- Akhmadjon Hasanzoda (since 3 August 2017)

== List of prime ministers of Tajikistan (1991–present) ==
No.	Portrait	Prime Minister	Took office	Left office	Time in office	Party
1	Izatullo Khayoyev	Izatullo Khayoyev (1936–2015)	25 June 1991	9 January 1992	198 days	Communist
2	Akbar Mirzoyev	Akbar Mirzoyev (born 1939)	9 January 1992	21 September 1992	256 days	Independent
3	Abdumalik Abdullajanov	Abdumalik Abdullajanov (born 1949)	21 September 1992	18 December 1993	1 year, 88 days	People's Unity
4	Abdujalil Samadov	Abdujalil Samadov (1949–2004)	18 December 1993	2 December 1994	349 days	Independent
5	Jamshed Karimov	Jamshed Karimov (born 1940)	2 December 1994	8 February 1996	1 year, 68 days	Independent
6	Yahyo Azimov	Yahyo Azimov (born 1947)	8 February 1996	20 December 1999	3 years, 315 days	Independent
7	Oqil Oqilov	Oqil Oqilov (born 1944)	20 December 1999	23 November 2013	13 years, 338 days	PDP
8	Qohir Rasulzoda	Qohir Rasulzoda (born 1961)	23 November 2013	Incumbent	12 years, 306 days	PDP

== See also ==
- List of leaders of Tajikistan
- President of Tajikistan
- Vice President of Tajikistan
