= Urunboi Ashurov =

Tajik politician

Urunboi Ashurovich Ashurov (Tajik: Ӯрунбой Ашӯров; 1903–1938) was the First Secretary of the Communist Party of Tajikistan between September 1937 and March 1938.

He was born in Fergana and was executed during the Great Purge in Stalinabad.

He was awarded the Order of the Red Banner of Labor.
