= Tajik Soviet Socialist Republic =

1929–1991 republic of the Soviet Union; historical state from 1991–1994

Coordinates: 38°32′N 68°46′E

Tajik Soviet Socialist Republic (Note: Historical names: 1929–1936: Tajik Socialist Soviet Republic (Tajik: Ҷумҳурии Сотсиалистии Шӯравии Тоҷикистон Russian: Таджикская Социалистическая Советская Республика)) (1936–1991) Ҷумҳурии Шӯравии Сотсиалистии Тоҷикистон (Tajik) Таджикская Советская Социалистическая Республика (Russian) Republic of Tajikistan (1991–1994) Ҷумҳурии Тоҷикистон (Tajik) Республика Таджикистан (Russian)
- 1929–1991
- Top: Flag (1953–1992); Bottom: Flag (1992–1994) Top: State emblem (1940–1991); Bottom: State emblem (1993–1994)
- Motto: Пролетарҳои ҳамаи мамлакатҳо, як шавед! (Tajik); Proletarhoi hamai mamlakatho, yak şaved! (transliteration) "Proletarians of all nations, unite!"
- Anthem: Гимни Республикаи Советии Сотсиалистии Тоҷикистон (Tajik); Gimni Respublikai Sovetii Sotsialistii Toçikiston (transliteration) "Anthem of the Tajik Soviet Socialist Republic"
- Location of Tajikistan (red) within the Soviet Union
- Status: 1929–1990: Union republic of the Soviet Union; 1990–1991: Union Republic with priority of the Tajik legislation September–December 1991: De facto independent state 1991–1994: Sovereign state
- Capital and largest city: Dushanbe^{a}
- Official languages: Tajik · Russian
- Religion: State atheism
- Demonyms: Tajik; Soviet
- Government: Unitary communist state (1929–1990); Unitary presidential republic (1990–1992); Unitary parliamentary republic (1992–1994)
- First Secretary
  - 1929–1933 (first): Mirza Davud Huseynov
  - 1985–1991 (last): Qahhor Mahkamov
- Head of state
  - 1929–1933 (first): Nusratullo Maksum
  - 1991 (last): Rahmon Nabiyev
- Head of government
  - 1929–1933 (first): Abdurrahim Hojibayev
  - 1986–1991 (last): Izatullo Khayoyev
- Legislature: Supreme Soviet
- History
  - Union republic proclaimed: 5 December 1929
  - Name adopted: 5 December 1936
  - Ethnic riots in Dushanbe: 12 February 1990
  - Sovereignty declared: 24 August 1990
  - Renamed to the Republic of Tajikistan: 31 August 1991
  - Independence declared: 9 September 1991
  - Independence recognized: 26 December 1991
  - New constitution, end of the Soviet system of government: 6 November 1994

Population
  - 1989 census: 5,108,576
- HDI: 0.258 low
- Currency: Soviet ruble (Rbl) (SUR)
- Calling code: +7 377/379
Preceded by	Succeeded by
1929: Tajik ASSR	1994: Republic of Tajikistan
- Today part of: Tajikistan
- 1. "Stalinabad" between 1929 and 1961.

The Tajik Soviet Socialist Republic, (Note: Tajik: Ҷумҳурии Шӯравии Сотсиалистии Тоҷикистон, romanized: Jumhuriyi Sho‘raviyi Socialistiyi Tojikiston, IPA: [dʒʊmɦʊˈrijɪ ʃɵrɐˈʋijɪ sətsɨɐˈlʲistɪjɪ tʰɔdʒikʰɪsˈtʰɔn]; Russian: Таджикская Советская Социалистическая Республика, romanized: Tadžikskaja Sovetskaja Socialističeskaja Respublika, IPA: [tɐˈdʐ(ː)ɨkskəjə sɐˈvʲetskəjə sətsɨəlʲɪˈsʲtʲitɕɪskəjə rʲɪˈspublʲɪkə]) also commonly known as Soviet Tajikistan, the Tajik SSR, TaSSR, or simply Tajikistan, was one of the constituent republics of the Soviet Union which existed from 1929 to 1991 and an independent sovereign state from 1991 to 1994 in Central Asia.

The Tajik Republic was created on 5 December 1929 as a national entity for the Tajik people within the Soviet Union. It succeeded the Tajik Autonomous Soviet Socialist Republic (Tajik SSR), which had been created on 14 October 1924 as a part of the predominantly Turkic Uzbek SSR in the process of national delimitation in Soviet Central Asia. On 24 August 1990, the Tajik SSR declared sovereignty in its borders. The republic was renamed the Republic of Tajikistan on 31 August 1991 and declared its independence from the disintegrating Soviet Union on 9 September 1991; thus modern Tajikistan is its direct legal successor state; but however the state was officially dissolved on 6 November 1994 when the Constitution of Tajikistan was adopted.

Geographically, at 143,100 km^{2} (55,300 sq mi), it was bordered by Afghanistan to the south, China to the east, Pakistan to the south, separated by the narrow Wakhan Corridor, as well as internally by fellow Soviet republics of Uzbekistan to the west, Kyrgyzstan to the north. Notably, the Tajik SSR was the only republic of the Soviet Union to be separated from the Russian SFSR by more than one other republic.

== Nomenclature ==
The name Tajik refers to the name of a pre-Islamic tribe that existed before the seventh century A.D. Based on the Library of Congress's 1997 Country Study of Tajikistan, it is difficult to definitively state the origins of the word "Tajik" citing due to its "embroiled in twentieth-century political disputes about whether Turkic or Iranian peoples were the original inhabitants of Central Asia."

The name of the country was often spelt "Tadzhikistan" in the English language during Soviet times due to it being borrowed directly from the Russian spelling "Таджикистан", where the letters 'дж' produce a 'j' sound.

Date	Name
5 December 1929	Tajik Socialist Soviet Republic
5 December 1936	Tajik Soviet Socialist Republic
31 August 1991	Republic of Tajikistan

== History ==
One of the new states created in the process of national delimitation of Soviet Central Asia in October 1924 was the Uzbek Soviet Socialist Republic – Uzbek SSR or Soviet Uzbekistan. Soviet Tajikistan was created at the same time within the predominantly Turkic Uzbek SSR as an Autonomous Soviet Socialist Republic (Tajik ASSR) – one rank below a Soviet Socialist Republic in USSR geopolitical hierarchy. The new autonomous republic included what had been eastern Bukhara and had a population of about 740,000, out of a total population of nearly 5 million in the Uzbek Soviet Socialist Republic as a whole. Its capital was established in Dushanbe, which had been a village of 3,000 in 1920. In December 1929, Tajik ASSR was detached from the Uzbek SSR and given full status as a Soviet Socialist Republic – Tajik Socialist Soviet Republic. At that time, its capital was renamed Stalinabad, after Joseph Stalin, and the territory that is now northern Tajikistan (Sughd Province) was added to the new republic. Even with the additional territory, the Tajik SSR remained the smallest Central Asian republic. On 5 December 1936, it was renamed the Tajik Soviet Socialist Republic.

With the creation of a Tajik republic defined in national terms came the creation of institutions that, at least in form, were likewise national. The first Tajik-language newspaper in Soviet Tajikistan began publication in 1926. New educational institutions also began operation at about the same time. The first state schools, available to both children and adults and designed to provide basic education, opened in 1926. The central government also trained a small number of Tajiks for public office, either by putting them through courses offered by government departments or by sending them to schools in the Uzbek SSR.

Under Soviet rule, Tajikistan experienced some economic and social progress. However, living standards in the republic were still among the lowest in the Union. Most people still lived in rural qishlaqs, settlements that were composed of 200 to 700 one-family houses built along a waterway.

During the Great Purge, many influential members of the local communist party such as Abdurrahim Hojibayev, Nusratullo Maksum, Shirinsho Shotemur and Mirza Davud Huseynov were executed on Stalin's orders. After Stalin's death in March 1953, Stalinabad was renamed Dushanbe on 10 November 1961 as part of the de-Stalinization program of his successor Nikita Khrushchev.

In February 1990, riots occurred in the republic's capital Dushanbe. 26 people died and 565 more were injured and the Soviet troops put down the riots. Yaqub Salimov, a future Interior Minister, and some youth activists were convicted for participation in the riots.

Later on 24 August 1990, the Tajik SSR declared its sovereignty over Soviet laws. By 1991, Tajikistan participated in a referendum in March as part of the attempt to preserve the union with a turnout of 96.85%. However, this did not happen when hardliners took control of Moscow during the next three days in August. After the failure of the coup, the Tajik SSR was renamed the Republic of Tajikistan on 31 August 1991. On 9 September 1991, Tajikistan seceded from the Soviet Union months before the country itself ceased to exist on 26 December 1991. Conflicts after independence caused a civil war throughout the country over the next six years.

Over the next couple of years, Tajikistan shifted between presidential and parliamentary systems under the heavily amended 1978 constitution. Then on 6 November 1994, the new Constitution of Tajikistan was adopted.

== Politics ==
Tajikistan, like all other republics in the Soviet Union, was officially a Soviet republic governed by the Tajik republican branch within the Communist Party of the Soviet Union in all organs of government, politics and society. The Supreme Soviet was a unicameral legislature of the republic headed by a chairman, with its superiority to both the executive and judicial branches and its members convened in the Supreme Soviet building in Dushanbe. Since independence in 1991, it retained the unicameral structure before being replaced by a bicameral system in 1999 using the presidential system. The republic's government structure was similar to those of other republics.

== Military ==
Tajikistan was the only Central Asian Republic to not form an army under the Soviet Armed Forces. In replacement were the Soviet units under the Ministry of Defence, as well as troops who were subordinates of the Turkestan Military District and the Central Asian Military District in neighboring Uzbekistan and Kazakhstan respectively. In the early 1990s the army was the smallest in the union and had more Russians than native Tajiks in it. The army failed to effectively defend the regime as proven in the 1990 Dushanbe riots. There was a large contingent of Soviet border guards who were commanded by Russians based from Moscow who commanded ethnic Tajik conscripts. When the TurkVO was dissolved in June 1992, its personnel were distributed between Tajikistan and the other 4 Central Asian republics.

The Tajik SSR also operated its own Ministry of Internal Affairs and Internal Troops, which was an independent republican affiliate of the Ministry of Internal Affairs of the Soviet Union.

== Economy ==
=== Industry ===
The light and food industries accounted for over 60% of industrial output. The main branches of heavy industry were electric power, mining, non-ferrous metallurgy, machine building, metalworking, and the building materials industry. The basis of the electricity accounted for HPP. Mining activities concentrated on the extraction of brown coal and oil and natural gas. Non-ferrous metals industries included an aluminum plant in Tursunzade and a hydrometallurgical plant in Isfara. The engineering sector had its hub at Dushanbe and produced winding, agricultural machinery, equipment for trading enterprises and public catering, textiles, lighting and wiring equipment, transformers, household refrigerators, and cables, among other products. Chemical industrial plants included one for nitrogen fertilizer in Kurgan-Tube, electrochemical products in Yovon, and plastics in Dushanbe. The main branches of light industry were cotton ginning, silk, and carpet weaving. The food industry consisted partially of the fruit-canning, vegetable oils, and fat industries.

=== Agriculture ===
In 1986, there were 299 state-owned and 157 collective farms in the country. Designated agricultural land amounted to 4.2 million hectares (10 million acres).

Due to the large irrigation works in the area of irrigated land 1986 have reached 662 thousand hectares. Agriculture gave about 65% of gross agricultural output. The leading branch of agriculture was cotton (cotton collection 922 thousand tons in 1986), developed in Fergana, Vakhsh, Hissar valleys. Tajikistan was the main base of the country for the production of long-staple cotton. Cultured and tobacco, geranium, linen - Kudryashov, sesame. Approximately 20% of crops were occupied by grain crops (gross grain harvest - 246 thousand tons in 1986 in.). They grow vegetables and melons. Was developed fruit (including citrus fruit) and grapes. Meat and wool sheep and meat and dairy cattle. Livestock (in 1987, in millions): cattle - 1.4 (including cows - 0.6), sheep and goats - 3.2. Sericulture.

== Transportation ==
Operating length (in 1986):

- Railways – 470 km
- Roads – 13,200 km (including paved – 11,600 km.)
- Airports

Tajikistan is supplied with gas from Uzbekistan and Afghanistan with gas pipelines from Kelif to Dushanbe, from local gas fields.
