= 2022 in Tajikistan =

- Decades: 2000s; 2010s; 2020s
- See also: Other events of 2022; Timeline of Tajikistani history

This is a list of individuals and events related to Tajikistan in 2022.

== Incumbents ==
Photo	Post	Name
	President of Tajikistan	Emomali Rahmon
	Prime Minister of Tajikistan	Kokhir Rasulzoda

== Events ==
- January 27 – Two civilians are killed while 21 more people are wounded near the border between Kyrgyzstan and Tajikistan after troops from both countries engage in a battle.
- March 5 – Baku, Azerbaijan, and Dushanbe, Tajikistan, become sister cities.
- March 10 – An armed incident occurs between border guards at the Kyrgyzstan–Tajikistan border, killing one Tajik border guard. Following the incident, officials from the Batken Region in Kyrgyzstan and the Sughd Region in Tajikistan hold talks.
- May 18 – Around 200 anti-government militants block a road in Gorno-Badakhshan, Tajikistan, which links the country to China. Some of the militants, armed with firearms and petrol bombs, later ambush a security convoy on the same road. Eight militants and one officer are killed, while 13 officers are injured and more than 70 militants are arrested. The Tajik interior ministry later say the attack was an attempt to "destabilise the social and political situation" in the region.
- June 4 – Tajikistan says that a border clash happened yesterday after Kyrgyz soldiers crossed the border close to Vorukh.
- June 14 – A Tajik border guard is killed and three others are injured in a clash with Kyrgyzstan border troops.
- June 26 – Russian President Vladimir Putin embarks on a foreign trip to Tajikistan and Turkmenistan, his first since the Russian invasion of Ukraine.
- September 14 – Two Tajik border guards are killed and two others are injured during clashes with Kyrgyz guards, who accuse Tajikistan of taking positions at a demarcated area.
- September 16 – According to Kyrgyzstan, Tajik forces again open fire on its outposts and clashes occur along the border with Tajik forces using armored vehicles and mortars. Tajikistan accuses Kyrgyz forces of shelling one of its outposts and several villages.
- September 18 – The death toll from the fighting between Kyrgyzstan and Tajikistan, which began four days ago, increases to 94. Fifty-nine of the people were killed in Kyrgyzstan, and the 35 others were killed in Tajikistan. Another 139 people are injured.

== Deaths ==
- January 5 – Valeriy Gorbach, 53, footballer (Fakel Voronezh, Lokomotiv Liski, national team)
- March 8 – Sergei Mandreko, 50, Russian-Tajik football player (Rapid Wien, VfL Bochum, Russia national team) and manager, complications from amyotrophic lateral sclerosis
- August 15 – Nur Tabar, 81, Tajik writer and politician, people's deputy (1987–1990)

== See also ==
- Outline of Tajikistan
- Index of Tajikistan-related articles
- List of Tajikistan-related topics
- History of Tajikistan
