= 2026 in Tajikistan =

- Decades: 2000s; 2010s; 2020s
- See also: Other events of 2026; Timeline of Tajikistani history

Events in the year 2026 in Tajikistan.

== Incumbents ==
Photo	Post	Name
	President of Tajikistan	Emomali Rahmon
	Prime Minister of Tajikistan	Qohir Rasulzoda

== Events ==
- 26 March – Tajikistani President Emomali Rahmon arrives in Uzbekistan for a state visit, during which the Tajikistan embassy is officially inaugurated in Tashkent.
- 2 July – A crash involving a truck and two cars on the Dushanbe-Kulob-Khorog highway near Vahdat kills 11 people.

== Holidays ==
- 1 January – New Year's Day
- 23 February – Armed Forces Day
- 8 March – International Women's Day
- 21-24 March – Nowruz
- 20 March – Idi Ramazon
- 1 May – Labour Day
- 9-11 May – Victory Day
- 27 May – Idi Qurbon
- 27 June – National Unity Day
- 4 August – Paratroopers' Day
- 9 September – Independence Day
- 2 October – Presidential National Guard Day
- 6 November – Constitution Day

== Art and entertainment ==
- List of Tajikistani submissions for the Academy Award for Best International Feature Film

== Deaths ==
- 1 January – Mukhsin Mukhamadiev, 59, Tajik-Russian football player (Tajikistan national team, Russia national team) and manager (Tajikistan national team)
- 17 June – Alisher Mirzonabot, 45, MP (since 2022)
- 12 September – Nikolay Noev, 38, Russian-born Olympic wrestler (2012)
