= 2025 in Tajikistan =

- Decades: 2000s; 2010s; 2020s
- See also: Other events of 2025; Timeline of Tajikistani history

This is a list of individuals and events related to Tajikistan in 2025.

== Incumbents ==
Photo	Post	Name
	President of Tajikistan	Emomali Rahmon
	Prime Minister of Tajikistan	Kokhir Rasulzoda

== Events ==
=== February ===
- 21 February – Tajikistan and Kyrgyzstan announce an agreement to delineate their common border.

=== March ===
- 2 March – 2025 Tajik parliamentary election (Assembly of Representatives): The ruling People's Democratic Party of Tajikistan wins 49 of 63 seats in the chamber.
- 28 March – 2025 Tajik parliamentary election (National Assembly)
- 31 March – Tajikistan, Kyrgyzstan and Uzbekistan sign an agreement fixing their common border's tripoint.

=== April ===
- 10 April – A Boeing 737-500 passenger aircraft operated by Varesh Airlines veers off the runway while landing at Dushanbe International Airport from Tehran due to adverse weather conditions. No injuries are reported.
- 11 April – The Islamic Renaissance Party of Tajikistan and two NGOs file a lawsuit with the International Criminal Court, accusing President Emomali Rahmon's administration of crimes against humanity.
- 13 April – A magnitude 5.8 earthquake hits Rasht District, killing one person.

=== June ===
- 16 June – Flash floods near Kosatarosh and Penjikent cause severe damage to irrigation infrastructure and farmland.
- 26 June – U.S. prosecutors charge two Tajik nationals for operating a human smuggling network bringing individuals into the United States via Mexico.

=== July ===
- 10 July – Tajikistan issues a 15-day deadline for Afghan refugees to leave the country in the launch of a mass deportation campaign.
- 12 July – The ancient site of Khuttal is designated as a World Heritage Site by UNESCO.
- 23 July – Tajikistan confirms the deportation of Afghan refugees, citing security and legal violations.

=== September ===
- 27 September – The Ramit State Nature Reserve is designated as a biosphere reserve by UNESCO.

=== October ===
- 8 October – Russian president Vladimir Putin arrives in Dushanbe for a three-day state visit and a summit meeting with CIS leaders.

=== November ===
- 26 November – Three Chinese workers are killed in an attack on their camp in Khatlon Region involving a drone believed to have originated from Afghanistan.
- 30 November – Two people are killed in an attack on employees of the China Road and Bridge Corporation in Darvoz District by gunmen believed to have originated from Afghanistan.

=== December ===
- 24 December – Clashes break out in Shamsiddin Shokhin district between the Tajik Border Troops and gunmen who enter the country from Afghanistan, leaving two border guards and three intruders dead.

== Holidays ==
- 1 January – New Year's Day
- 8 March – International Women's Day
- 21 March – Nowruz
- 30 – 31 March – Eid al-Fitr
- 1 May – International Workers' Day
- 9 May – Day of Memory and Honour
- 6 June – Eid al-Adha
- 27 June – National Unity Day
- 4 August – Paratroopers' Day
- 9 September – Independence Day
- 2 October – Presidential National Guard Day
- 6 November – Constitution Day

== Art and entertainment ==
- List of Tajikistani submissions for the Academy Award for Best International Feature Film

== Deaths ==
- 8 April – Svetlana Gerasimenko, 80, astronomer
- 19 October – Karomatullohi Mirzo, 82, writer
