= 2020 in Tajikistan =

- Decades: 2000s; 2010s; 2020s
- See also: Other events of 2020; Timeline of Tajikistani history

Events in the year 2020 in Tajikistan.

== Incumbents ==
- President: Emomali Rahmon
- Prime Minister: Kokhir Rasulzoda

== Events ==
=== January ===
- January 28 – Prosecutor General Yusuf Rakhmon announced the arrest of 113 alleged members of the Muslim Brotherhood.

=== February ===
- February 13 – In response to the spread of COVID-19, 13,000 copies of WHO guidelines and recommendations to reduce the risk of coronavirus infection were printed and distributed to Tajik citizens.

=== March ===
- March 1 – Parliamentary elections were held in the country, with a total of 241 candidates contesting 22 party-list seats and 41 constituency seats. The result was a landside victory for the ruling People's Democratic Party, which won 47 of the 63 seats. The only opposition party, the Social Democratic Party, received just 0.3% of the vote while the Islamic Renaissance Party of Tajikistan was unable to participate, having been banned by the authorities over terrorism allegations in 2015.

=== April ===
- April 13 – The country reported its first confirmed cases of COVID-19. Five people have tested positive for the virus in the capital Dushanbe, and 10 others in the northern Sughd Region, according to the state-run news agency Khovar.

== See also ==
- List of years in Tajikistan
- 2020 in Tajikistan
- 2020 in Tajikistani sport
