= 1993 in Tajikistan =

- Decades: 1970s; 1990s; 2000s; 2010s
- See also: Other events of 1993; Timeline of Tajikistani history

Events in the year 1993 in Tajikistan.

== Incumbents ==
- Chairman of the Supreme Soviet: Emomali Rahmon
- Prime Minister: Abdumalik Abdullajanov (1992-1993) and Abdujalil Samadov (1993-1994)

== Events ==
=== January ===
- 7 January - The government declares a state-of-emergency in Dushanbe.

=== February ===
- 23 February - The Armed Forces of the Republic of Tajikistan is established by decree of Chairman Rahmon and February 23 is declared a national holiday.

=== March ===
- 7 March - A CIS peacekeeping force was deployed to Tajikistan.

=== June ===
- 6–14 June – Tajikistan takes part in the 1993 ECO Cup in Tehran.

=== July ===
- 19 July - 45 people were killed after rebels had raided a village near the city of Kofarnihon (now Vahdat) and were stopped by troops.

=== August ===
- 28 August - A Tajik Air Yakovlev Yak-40 passenger flight crashed at Khorog Airport in the Gorno-Badakhshan Autonomous Region, killing 82 passengers and crew members on board were killed.

=== December ===
- 18 December - Abdumalik Abdullajanov is replaced by Abdujalil Samadov as the Prime Minister of Tajikistan.

== Deaths ==
- 11 April – Rahmon Nabiyev, 2nd President of the Republic of Tajikistan.
- Date unknown – Khalimakhon Suleymanova, farmer (b. 1907)
