= List of heads of regions of Tajikistan =

Tajik position

The Chairman of the Hukumat (Tajik: Раиси ҳукумат, romanized: Raisi hukumat) is the head of a local executive authority in Tajikistan. There are Hukumats within the Regions of Tajikistan as well as in Dushanbe, the capital.

== Sughd Region ==
- Abdudjalil Hamidov (1995 — February 2, 1996)
- Kosim Rokhbar (February 2, 1996 — December 2006)
- Kokhir Rasulzoda (February 27, 2007 — November 23, 2013)
- Abdurahmon Qodiri (November 23, 2013 — March 1, 2018)
- Rajabboy Ahmadzoda (Since March 7, 2018)

== Khatlon Region ==
- Amirsho Miraliev (May 2001 — December 4, 2006)
- Gaybullo Avzalov (February 27, 2007 — March 26, 2014)
- Davlatsho Gulmahmadov (Since November 27, 2013)

== Gorno-Badakhshan Autonomous Region ==
- Alimamad Niyozmamadov (December 1994 — November 25, 2006)
- Kosim Kodiri (February 19, 2007 — November 20, 2013)
- Jamshid Shodikhon (November 20, 2013 — October 1, 2018)
- Yodgor Fayzov (Since October 1, 2018)
