= Ramit =

Ramit may refer to:

== Given name ==
Notable people with this given name include:

- Ramit Tandon, Indian squash player
- Ramit Sethi, American entrepreneur

== Other ==
- Ramit State Nature Reserve, Tajikistan
