= 2019 in Tajikistan =

- Decades: 1990s; 2000s; 2010s; 2020s
- See also: Other events of 2019; Timeline of Tajikistani history

Events in the year 2019 in Tajikistan.

== Incumbents ==
- President: Emomali Rahmon
- Prime Minister: Kokhir Rasulzoda

== Events ==
- 19 February 2019 – The Tajikistan Football Federation announces that the season will consist of Istiklol, Khujand, Kuktosh, Regar-TadAZ, Khatlon, CSKA Pamir, Panjshir and Istaravshan.
