= 2021 in Tajikistan =

- Decades: 2000s; 2010s; 2020s
- See also: Other events of 2021; Timeline of Tajikistani history

This is a list of individuals and events related to Tajikistan in 2021.

== Incumbents ==
| Photo | Post | Name |
|---|---|---|
| | President of Tajikistan | Emomali Rahmon |
| | Prime Minister of Tajikistan | Kokhir Rasulzoda |

== Events ==
=== March to April ===
- April 9 - Tajik President Emomali Rahmon visited the Vorukh exclave, assuring residents that there would not be a land exchange with Kyrgyzstan for the territory.
- April 28 - Clashes began in Vorukh following border disputes between Tajikistan and Kyrgyzstan. At least 4 people are killed and hundreds displaced.
- April 29 - Kyrgyzstan and Tajikistan agrees for a ceasefire after a conflict erupts in Vorukh.

=== July to August ===
- 12 August - Russia will provide $1.1 million to build a new military outpost near Tajik-Afghan border following deteriorating security condition in Afghanistan.

== See also ==
- Outline of Tajikistan
- Index of Tajikistan-related articles
- List of Tajikistan-related topics
- History of Tajikistan
