= 2013 in Tajikistan =

- Decades: 1990s; 2000s; 2010s; 2020s
- See also: Other events of 2013; Timeline of Tajikistani history

The following lists events that happened during 2013 in Tajikistan.

== Incumbents ==
- President: Emomali Rahmon
- Prime Minister: Oqil Oqilov (until 23 November), Kokhir Rasulzoda (starting 23 November)

== Events ==
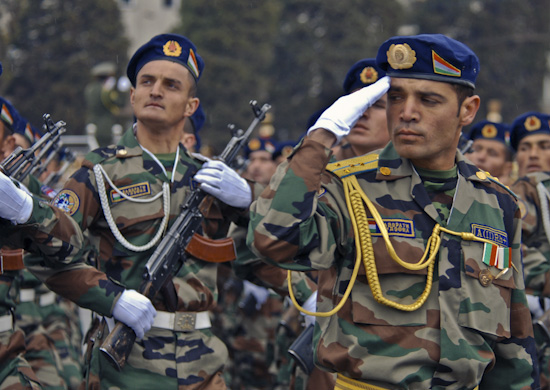

=== February ===
- February 23 - Tajik Armed Forces Day celebrations.

=== November ===
- November 6 - Voters in Tajikistan go to the polls for a presidential election. Incumbent President Emomali Rahmon of the People's Democratic Party was re-elected with approximately 84% of the vote.

=== December ===
- December 19 - Berlin city-state officials say that a police investigation has traced vehicles stolen in recent years in Germany to Tajikistan, some 5,600 kilometres (3,500 mi) away. German authorities alleged that relatives and other people close to Tajikistan's president are driving stolen luxury cars from Germany, as a long-running criminal probe escalated into a diplomatic spat between two countries.
