= 2018 in Tajikistan =

- Decades: 1990s; 2000s; 2010s; 2020s
- See also: Other events of 2018; Timeline of Tajikistani history

Events in the year 2018 in Tajikistan.

== Incumbents ==
- President: Emomali Rahmon
- Prime Minister: Kokhir Rasulzoda

== Events ==
- 29 July - Terrorist attack against cyclists in Tajikistan

=== Sports ===
- 9 to 18 March – Tajikistan participated at the 2018 Winter Paralympics in PyeongChang, South Korea.
- 18 August to 2 September - Tajikistan will participate at the 2018 Asian Games in Indonesia

== Deaths ==
- 1 May – Bozor Sobir, 79, poet, laureate of the Rudaki Prize.
- 18 May – Mumin Kanoat, poet (b. 1932)
