= 2023 in Tajikistan =

- Decades: 2000s; 2010s; 2020s
- See also: Other events of 2023; Timeline of Tajikistani history

This is a list of individuals and events related to Tajikistan in 2023.

== Incumbents ==
Photo	Post	Name
	President of Tajikistan	Emomali Rahmon
	Prime Minister of Tajikistan	Kokhir Rasulzoda

== Events ==
- February 15 – Around 10 people are killed in avalanches in Tajikistan.
- February 23 – 6.8 magnitude earthquake occurred in the Gorno-Badakhshan Autonomous Region.
- March 21 – 2023 Badakhshan earthquake
- August 30 – The death toll from torrential rains in Tajikistan rises to 21, as flooding, landslides, and mudflows affect towns near Dushanbe.
- September 6 – Tajikistan announces that it killed three Jamaat Ansarullah Islamist militants on 29–30 August after they crossed the border from Afghanistan to carry out terrorist attacks in Tajikistan.

== See also ==
- Outline of Tajikistan
- Index of Tajikistan-related articles
- List of Tajikistan-related topics
- History of Tajikistan
