= 2017 in Tajikistan =

- Decades: 1990s; 2000s; 2010s; 2020s
- See also: Other events of 2017; Timeline of Tajikistani history

Events in the year 2017 in Tajikistan.

== Incumbents ==
- President: Emomali Rahmon
- Prime Minister: Kokhir Rasulzoda

== Events ==
=== Sport ===
- 19-26 February – Tajikistan had four competitors at the 2017 Asian Winter Games, all in Alpine skiing.

== Deaths ==
- 1 May – Yuri Lobanov, sprint canoeist, Olympic champion 1972 and several times world champion (b. 1952).
- 7 July – Georgy Koshlakov, politician and scientist (b. 1936).
- December 28 – Mariam Nabieva, First Lady of Tajikistan (1991–1992)
