= 2027 in Tajikistan =

- Decades: 2000s; 2010s; 2020s
- See also: Other events of 2027; Timeline of Tajikistani history

Events in the year 2027 in Tajikistan.

== Events ==
- By October – 2027 Tajik presidential election

== Holidays ==
- 1 January – New Year's Day
- 23 February – Armed Forces Day
- 8 March – International Women's Day
- 9 March – Idi Ramazon
- 21-24 March – Nowruz
- 1 May – Labour Day
- 9-10 May – Victory Day
- 16-17 May – Idi Qurbon
- 27 June – National Unity Day
- 4 August – Paratroopers' Day
- 9 September – Independence Day
- 2 October – Presidential National Guard Day
- 6 November – Constitution Day

== Art and entertainment ==
- List of Tajikistani submissions for the Academy Award for Best International Feature Film
