= Tajik Air =

Airline in Tajikistan

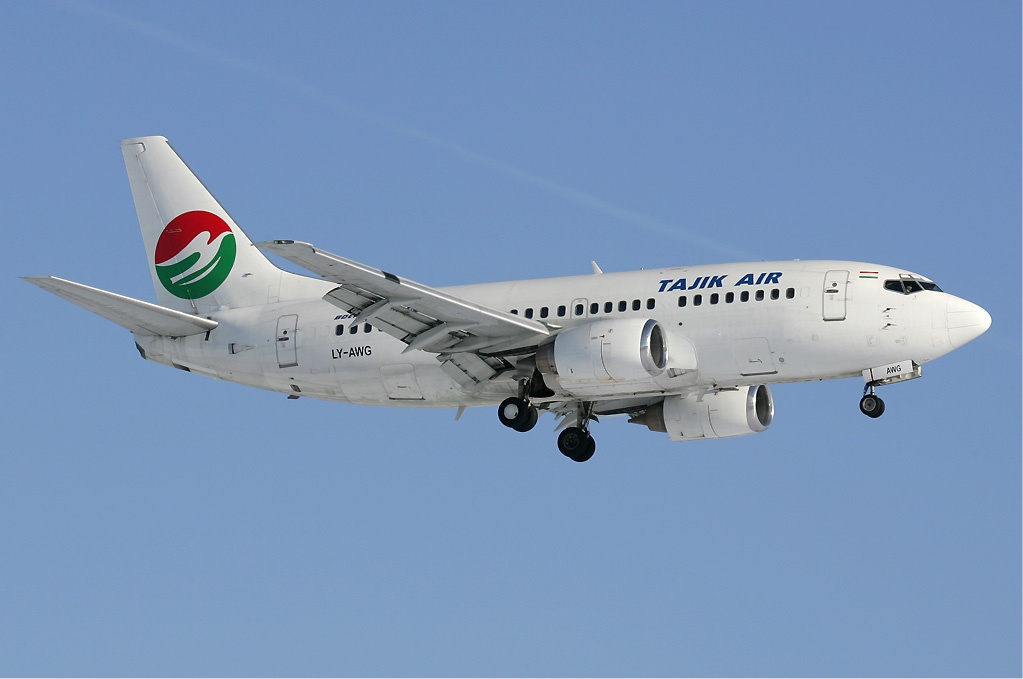
IATA	ICAO	Call sign
7J	TJK	TAJIKAIR
- Commenced operations: 3 September 1924; 102 years ago
- Hubs: Dushanbe International Airport
- Focus cities: Khujand Airport
- Fleet size: 4
- Destinations: 5
- Parent company: Government of Tajikistan
- Headquarters: Dushanbe, Tajikistan
- Key people: Parviz Shodmonzoda, Director General
- Website: tajikair.tj

Tajik Air (Tajik: Тоҷик Эйр, romanized: Tojik Air) is the flag carrier airline of Tajikistan. It has its head office at Dushanbe International Airport in Dushanbe. The airline's main hub is Dushanbe International Airport.

== History ==
The first flight of the airline was from Bukhara to Dushanbe on 3 September 1924 by a Junkers F.13 aircraft, initiating the development of civil aviation in Tajikistan. The first aircraft appeared in the capital two years earlier than the car and five years earlier than the train. The Stalinabad airfield complex was created and the operation of new routes started over the Pamir mountain ranges. In 1930, a first-class airport was built in Dushanbe. One year later airports were built in Kulyab, Garm, Panj, and Dangara where regular flights were operated from Dushanbe. Aviation of Tajikistan growing very fast as the air fleet expanded. Air transport became an essential branch of the country's national economy. Tajik aviation provided regular connections between the capital and the highland settlements in the hard-to-reach valleys of Vanch, Rushan, Shugnan, Bartang, Yagnob, and others, reducing the travel time of passengers of the mountain regions of the Pamirs, Karategin, blooming valleys of Vakhsh, Hissar by tens or hundreds of times. In March 1937, the Tajik Territorial Department of Civil Air Fleet was formed.

In 1945, the Tajik Department of Civil Air Fleet (TU GVF) received new Lisunov Li-2 and Junkers Ju 52 aircraft. The first flight by the crew of the Li-2 aircraft was operated on the route Stalinabad – Moscow. In the 1950s and 1960s, aviation in Tajikistan was one of the most developed sectors of the national economy of the Republic. From 1951, Antonov An-2s were utilized in the fleet of the Tajik Department of Civil Air Fleet and in 1954 Ilyushin Il-12s were introduced, by which the first flight on the route Stalinabad – Sochi was operated. Between 1956 and 1964, Ilyushin Il-14, Ilyushin Il-18 and Antonov An-6 (high-altitude version of the An-2) aircraft joined the fleet, as well as Mil Mi-4 helicopters.

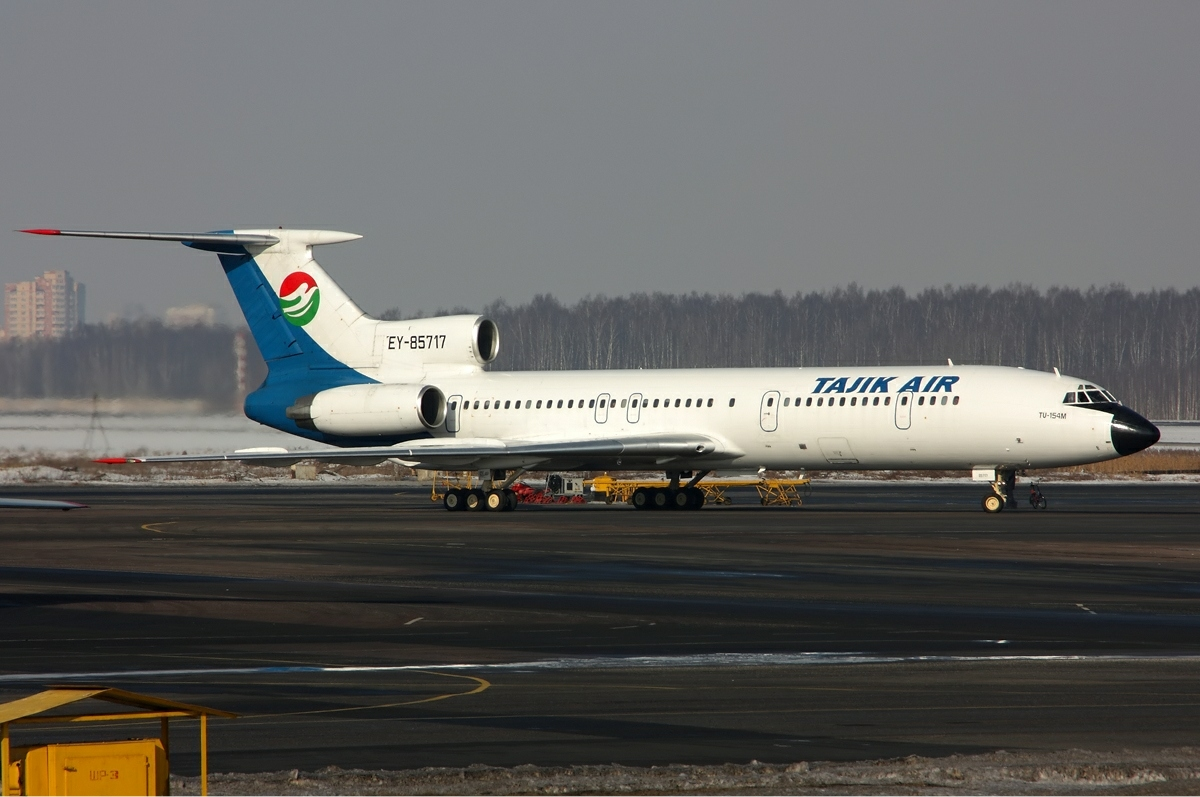
Tajik Air Tupolev Tu-154

Aviators of Tajikistan were always in the front line of development of the socio-economic potential of the country. For the first time in 1959, B.M. Vorobiev landed an aircraft (an An-6) on the ice of the Sarez Lake. In 1960, the first flight on the route Stalinabad – Moscow was operated by an Ilyushin Il-18. The TU GVF's structure was expanded and developed.

In 1959, the Leninabad aviation enterprise was founded and, in a year, the Kulyab airport was established. On March 3, 1960, the passenger terminal and runway were put into operation. The route Stalinabad – Frunze – Alma-Ata – Novosibirsk was opened. In the 1970s and '80s pilots and navigators of the Tajikistan Civil Aviation Authority mastered such aircraft as the Tupolev Tu-154, Yakovlev Yak-40, Antonov An-26 and Antonov An-28. In 1979, the first flight to Afghanistan was operated by an Il-18 aircraft on a humanitarian mission. In 1984, the automatic reservation system "Sirena" for booking seats on the domestic airlines was introduced. In 4 years, the Tajik Civil Aviation Authority changed over to the new conditions of management and planning.

Judging by the efficiency of the Yak-40 and An-28 aircraft utilization, the Tajik Civil Aviation Authority won first place in the USSR's Air Fleet. In the 1990-1991 period, the aircraft-helicopter fleet of the aviation enterprise was expanded with Ilyushin Il-76 and Tupolev Tu-154M aircraft; and Mil Mi-8 helicopters. Central Asia's first "Zardak" transponder was built and air service on the route Dushanbe-Ürümqi was opened.

On 14 January 2019, Tajik Air suspended all operations until it restarted in November 2019. However, Tajik Air suspended operations again on 14 September 2020 due to technical and financial difficulties. The airline has since been looking to restart operations, with a proposal to do so being sent to the Prime Minister, Qohir Rasulzoda, for consideration. After the suspension of flights by Tajik Air, Somon Air became the only airline in Tajikistan operating on both domestic and international passenger air routes.

=== Resumption of domestic routes ===
Starting from October 1, 2024, the airline operates regular flights on the Dushanbe-Khorog route using an AN-28 aircraft. Starting from January 2025, Tajik Air announces the launch of air routes between Dushanbe and Kulyab, as well as Dushanbe and Penjikent.

== Destinations ==
Tajik Air serves the following destinations as of February 2025:

Country	City	Airport	Notes	Refs
Tajikistan	Rasht District	Rasht Airport	Regular	
Tajikistan	Bokhtar	Bokhtar International Airport	Terminated	
Tajikistan	Dushanbe	Dushanbe International Airport	Hub	
Tajikistan	Gharm	Gharm	Regular	
Tajikistan	Khorugh	Khorog Airport	Regular	
Tajikistan	Kulob	Kulob Airport	Regular	
Tajikistan	Panjakent	Panjakent Airport	Regular	

== Fleet ==
=== Current fleet ===
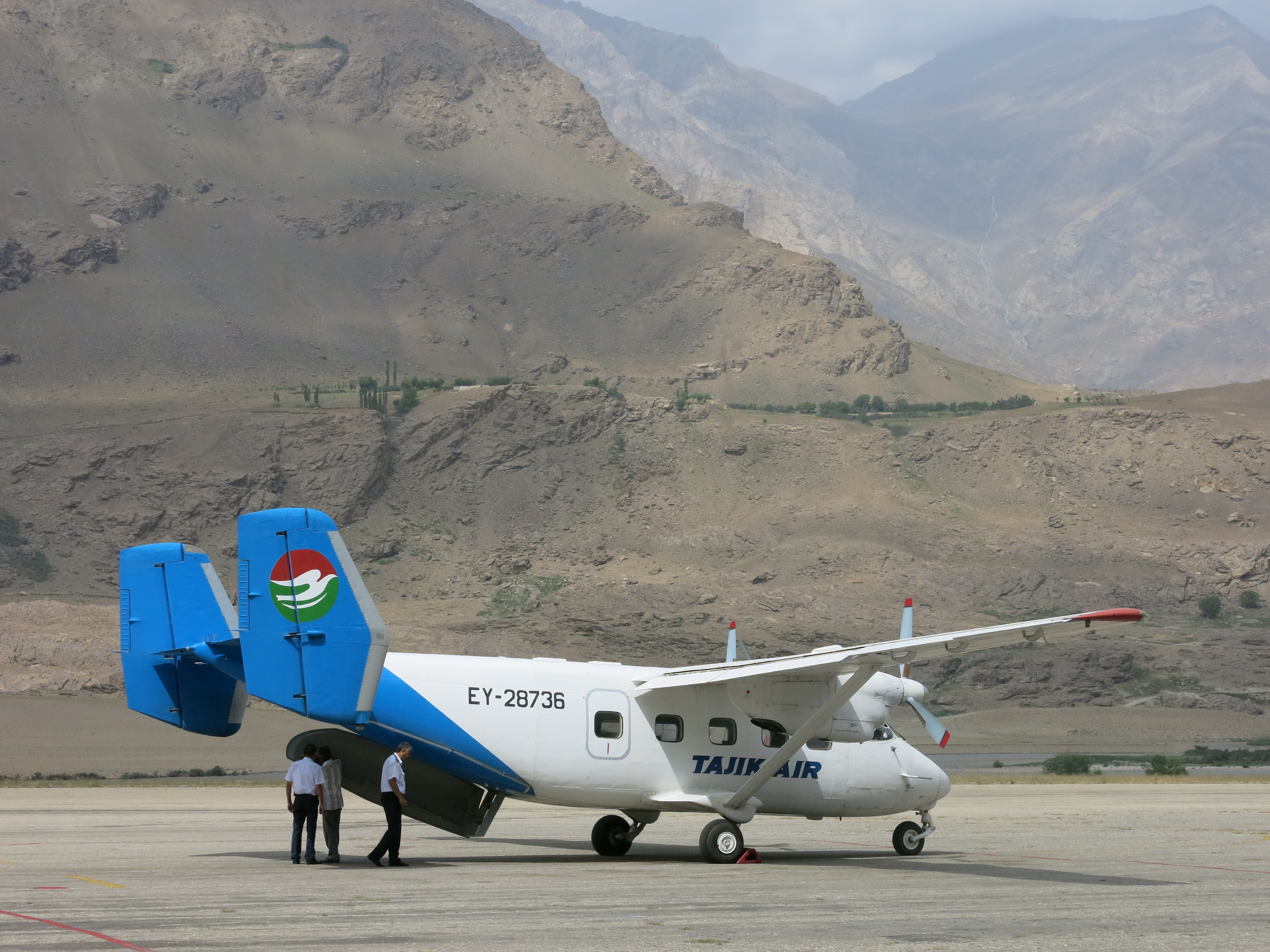
Antonov An-28 at Khorog

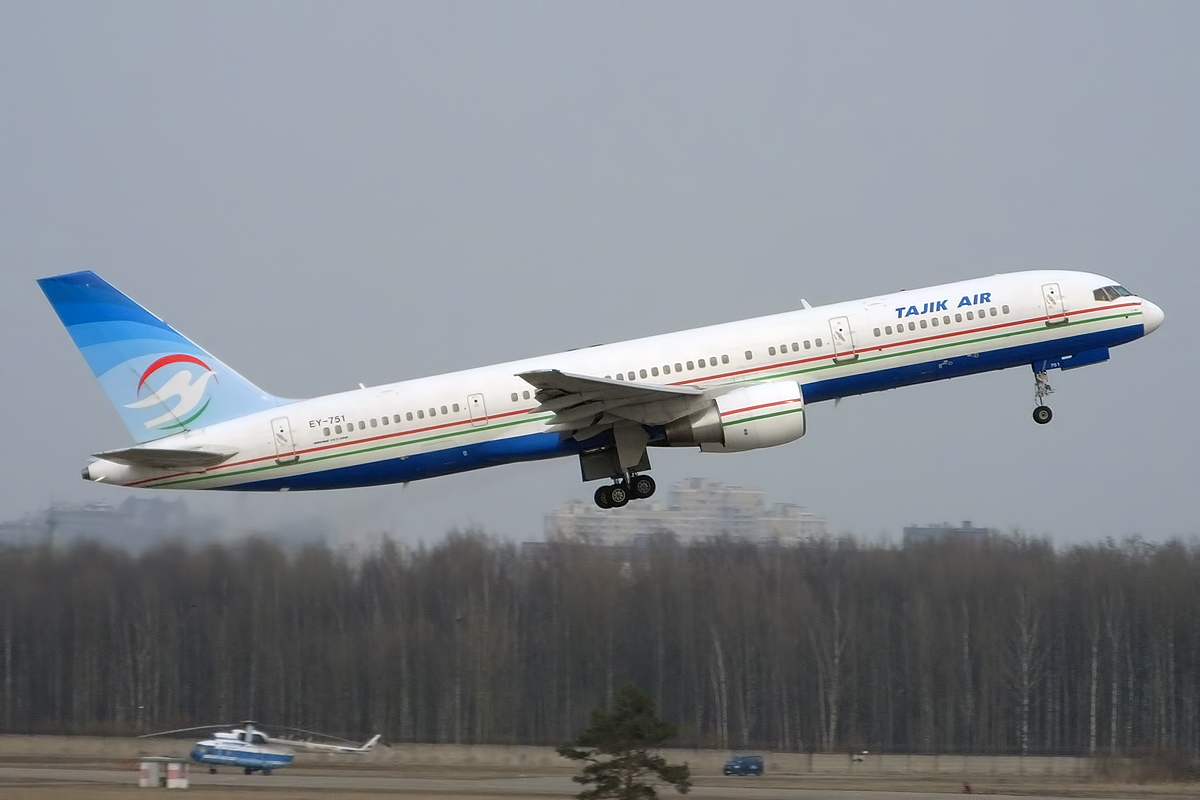
Tajik Air former Boeing 757-200

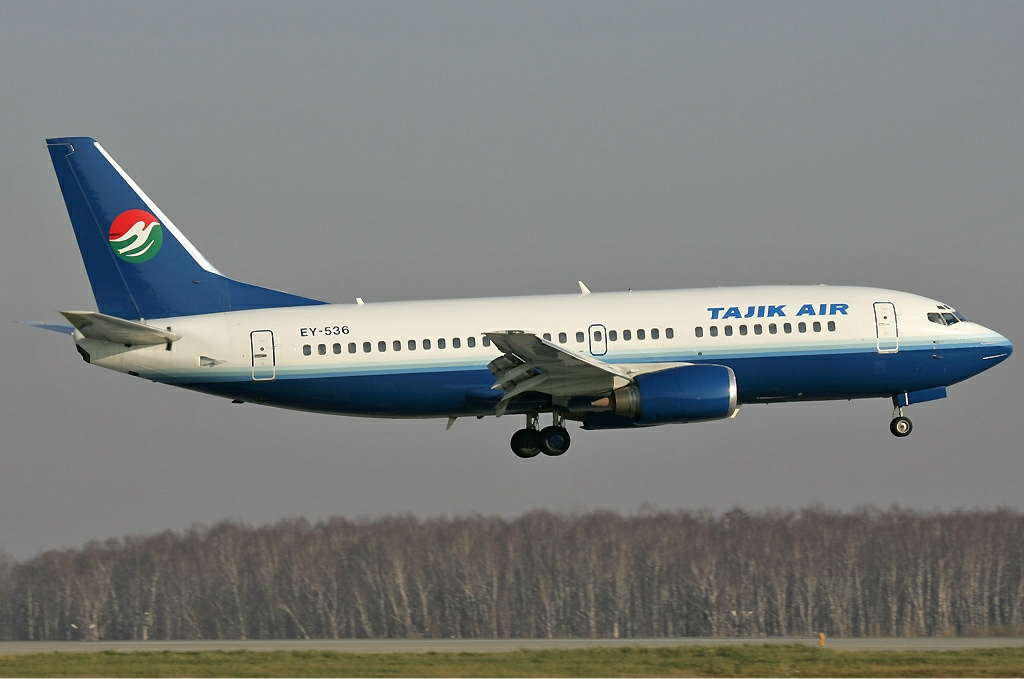
Tajik Air former Boeing 737-300

As of August 2025, Tajik Air operates the following aircraft:

Tajik Air fleet
Aircraft	In service	Orders	Passengers	Notes
Boeing 737-300	1	—		
Boeing 757-200	1	—		
Boeing 767-300	1	—		
Xian MA60	1	—		
Total	4	—		

=== Former fleet ===
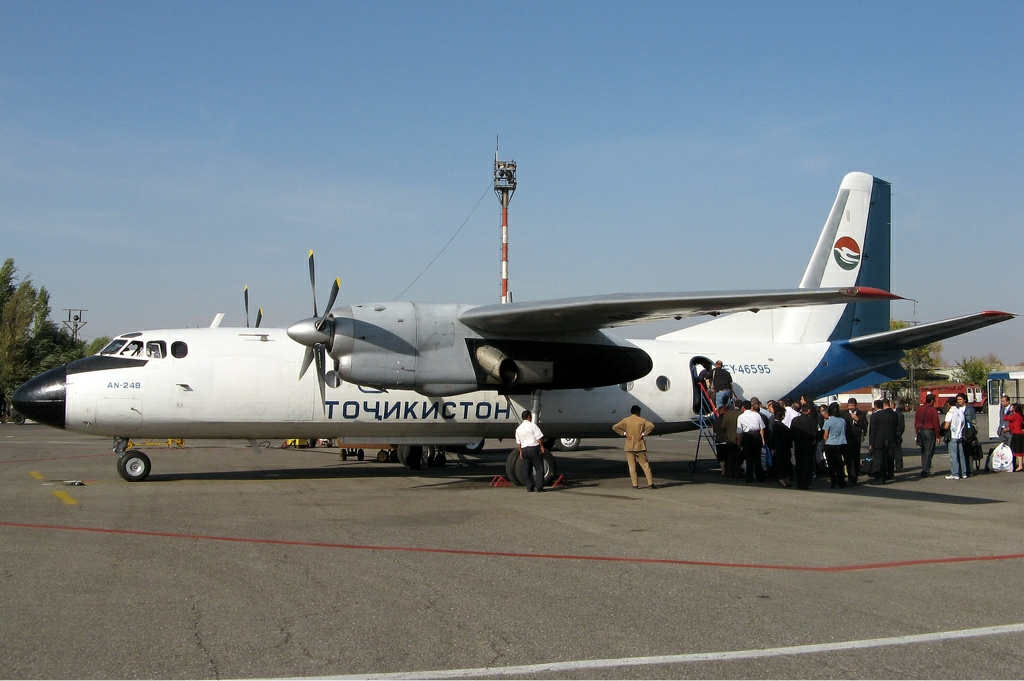
Tajik Air Antonov An-24

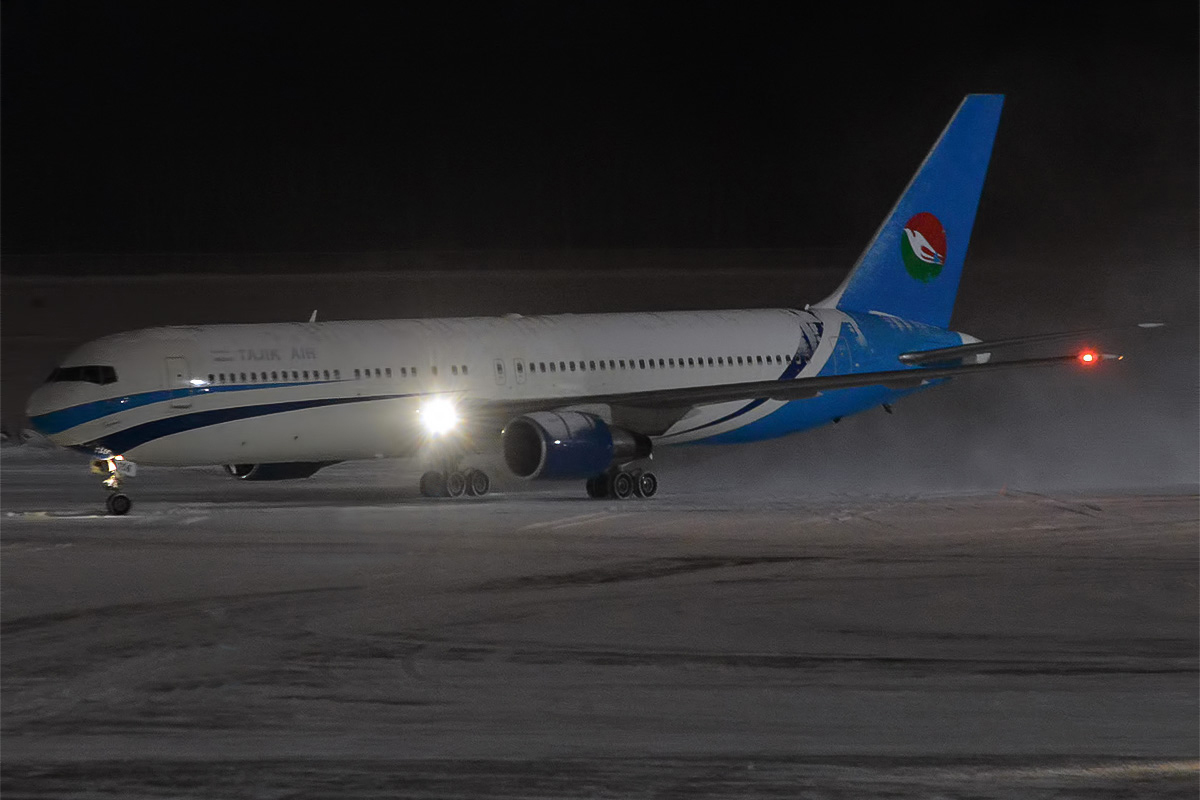
Boeing 767-332

Tajik Air had in the past operated a variety of aircraft:

- 2 Antonov An-28
- 1 Mil Mi-8

== Accidents and incidents ==
- On June 17, 1993, an Antonov An-26 crashed during the flight from Batumi, Georgia to Baku, Azerbaijan after it got into turbulence. All 33 people on board died.
- On August 28, 1993, a Yakovlev Yak-40 crashed on take-off in Khorog while on a flight to Dushanbe. All 5 crew members and 77 of the 81 passengers died. The aircraft was configured to carry 28 passengers but was severely overloaded. The crew had been forced to take off by armed men.
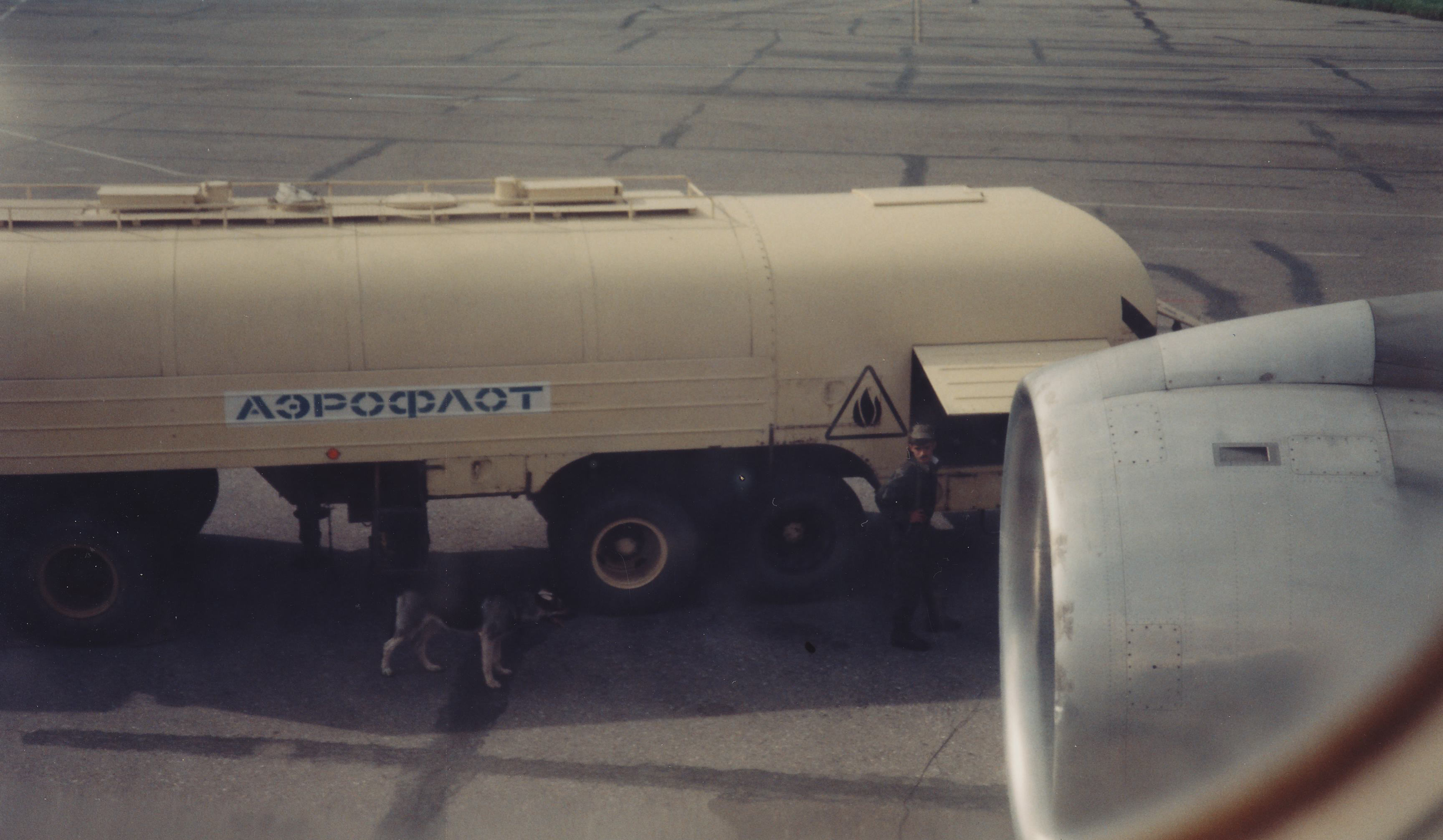
- A Russian Aeroflot fuel truck refueling in Sochi as seen from the window of the airplane - April 19, 1995.
  On April 19, 1995, a Lockheed L-1011 Tristar carrying approx. 300 passengers from New Delhi to Heathrow (via Dushanbe) was ordered to land in Sochi, Russia after entering Russian airspace. The departure from New Delhi was delayed for two days. When the flight finally left New Delhi, there was a layover in Dushanbe. Shortly after departing Dushanbe, the plane descended very low to allow fuel to be dumped in the Black Sea. None of the passengers were aware that this was in preparation for landing in Sochi (the plane had to reduce its landing weight). After landing, the plane sat on the tarmac for over 12 hours under armed guard while the pilot negotiated with local officials. After the airline paid approximately £5,000 to refuel, the passengers were asked to provide £2,000 as a bribe to allow the aircraft to depart.
- On December 15, 1997, Tajikistan Airlines Flight 3183, a Tupolev Tu-154B crashed at Sharjah in the United Arab Emirates, due to the landing approach being too low. Of the 86 people on board, only one survived, Sergei Petrov.

== See also ==
- List of airlines by foundation date
- List of airlines of Tajikistan
