= List of airlines of Tajikistan =

This is a list of airlines operating in Tajikistan.

== Currently operating ==
=== Air freight ===
Airline	ICAO	Callsign	Founded
Asia Sky Lines	LIC	ASIASLINE	2018
FlyUnion Airlines	FCH	SKY UNION	2019
Khatlon Air	KHT	KHATLON	2012
Sky Golden Lachin	LSG	SKY LACHIN	1969

=== Passenger airlines ===
Airline	Image	IATA	ICAO	Callsign	Founded	Notes
Shohin Airlines		DW	DSH	—	2025	
Somon Air		SZ	SMR	SOMON AIR	2007	Current largest airline
Tajik Air		7J	TJK	TAJIKAIR	1924	Flag carrier, resumed operations in early 2025.

== No longer operating ==
Airline	Image	IATA	ICAO	Callsign	Founded	Ceased operations	Notes
Asia Airways			ASW	ASIAWAYS	2007	2015	
Asian Express Airline		KV	TXP	TAJIK EXPRESS	2007	2019	In process of restarting.
East Air		EG	ETJ	EAST TAJIK	2007	2014	
Silkline Air			PAB		2012	2012	
Tajikistan International Airlines		TJ	TZK	TIL	1994	1997	
Toj Airlines		7J	TJK		1990	2016	

== See also ==
- List of airlines
- List of defunct airlines of Tajikistan
- List of defunct airlines of Asia
