= 1993 Tajikistan Airlines Yakovlev Yak-40 crash =

1993 aviation accident in Tajikistan

Coordinates: 37.5125°N 71.5080°E

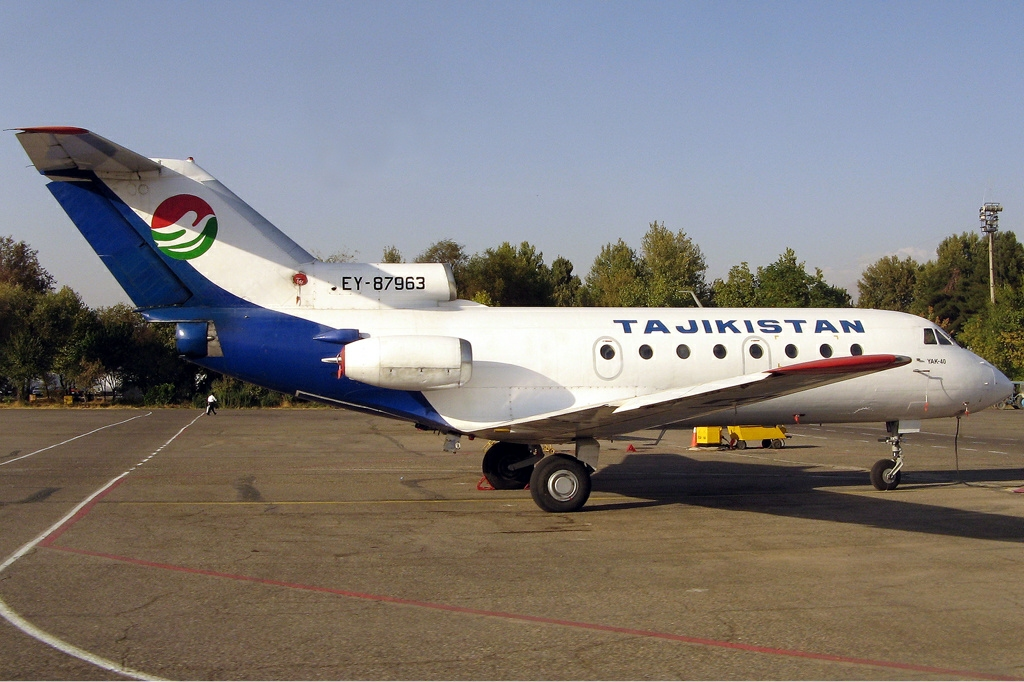
- Tajikistan Airlines Yakovlev Yak-40, similar to that involved in the accident

Accident
- Date: 28 August 1993
- Summary: Excess takeoff weight, runway overrun

Aircraft
- Aircraft type: Yakovlev Yak-40
- Operator: Tajikistan Airlines
- Registration: EY-87995
- Flight origin: Khorog Airport, Khorog
- Destination: Dushanbe Airport, Dushanbe
- Occupants: 86
- Passengers: 81
- Crew: 5
- Fatalities: 82
- Injuries: 4
- Survivors: 4

On 28 August 1993 a non-scheduled domestic passenger flight operated by Tajikistan Airlines and served by a Yakovlev Yak-40 crashed during takeoff at Khorog Airport, killing 82 people on board (including 14 children). Militants during the civil war in Tajikistan forced the crew to take more passengers than the aircraft was able to carry, which led to an excess takeoff weight. Unable to take off, the aircraft overran the runway at high speed, struck several obstacles and fell into the Panj River.

The crash remains the deadliest accident involving a Yakovlev Yak-40 and the deadliest aviation accident in Tajikistan.

== Crash ==
During boarding at Khorog, the militants controlling the adjacent area during the civil war threatened the crew with weapons and forced it to take 81 passengers, while the aircraft was designed to carry only 28. This led the maximum takeoff weight to be exceeded by 3,000 kg.

The crew was forced to take off under the threat of shooting. The left main landing gear struck a low earth embankment, 148 or 150 m beyond the runway end. Then the aircraft struck a boulder 60 cm high. Subsequently, the right gear struck a concrete pillbox 60 m further. The aircraft ultimately fell into the Panj River and disintegrated. Four passengers survived.
