= Tajikistan Airlines Flight 3183 =

1997 aircraft accident in the United Arab Emirates

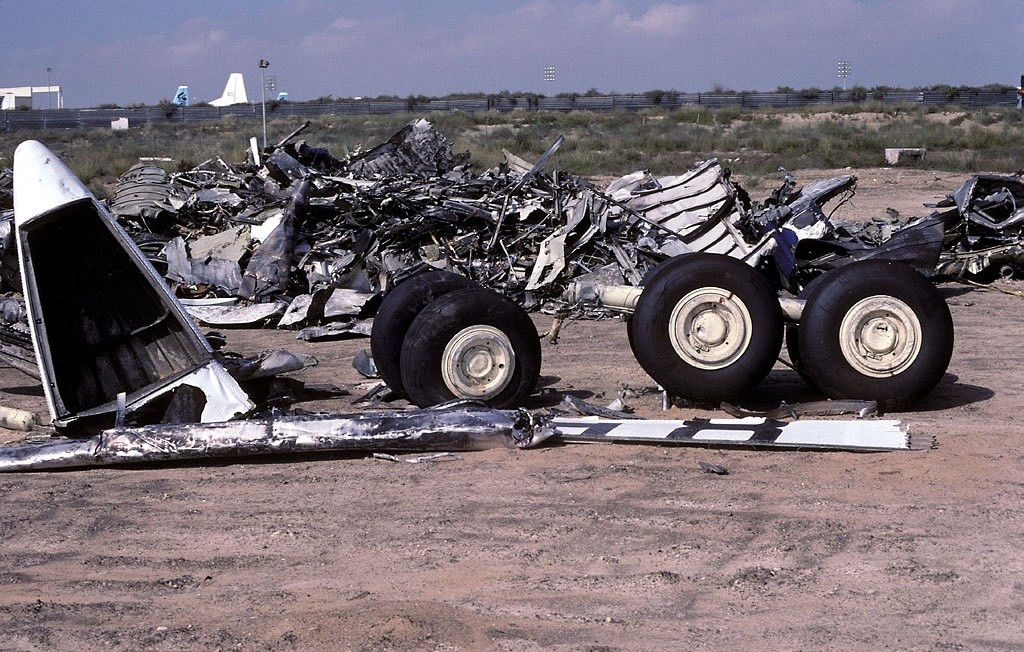
- Scattered wreckage

Accident
- Date: 15 December 1997
- Summary: Controlled flight into terrain due to pilot error
- Site: Near Sharjah Airport, United Arab Emirates; 25.281872°N 55.642164°E

Aircraft
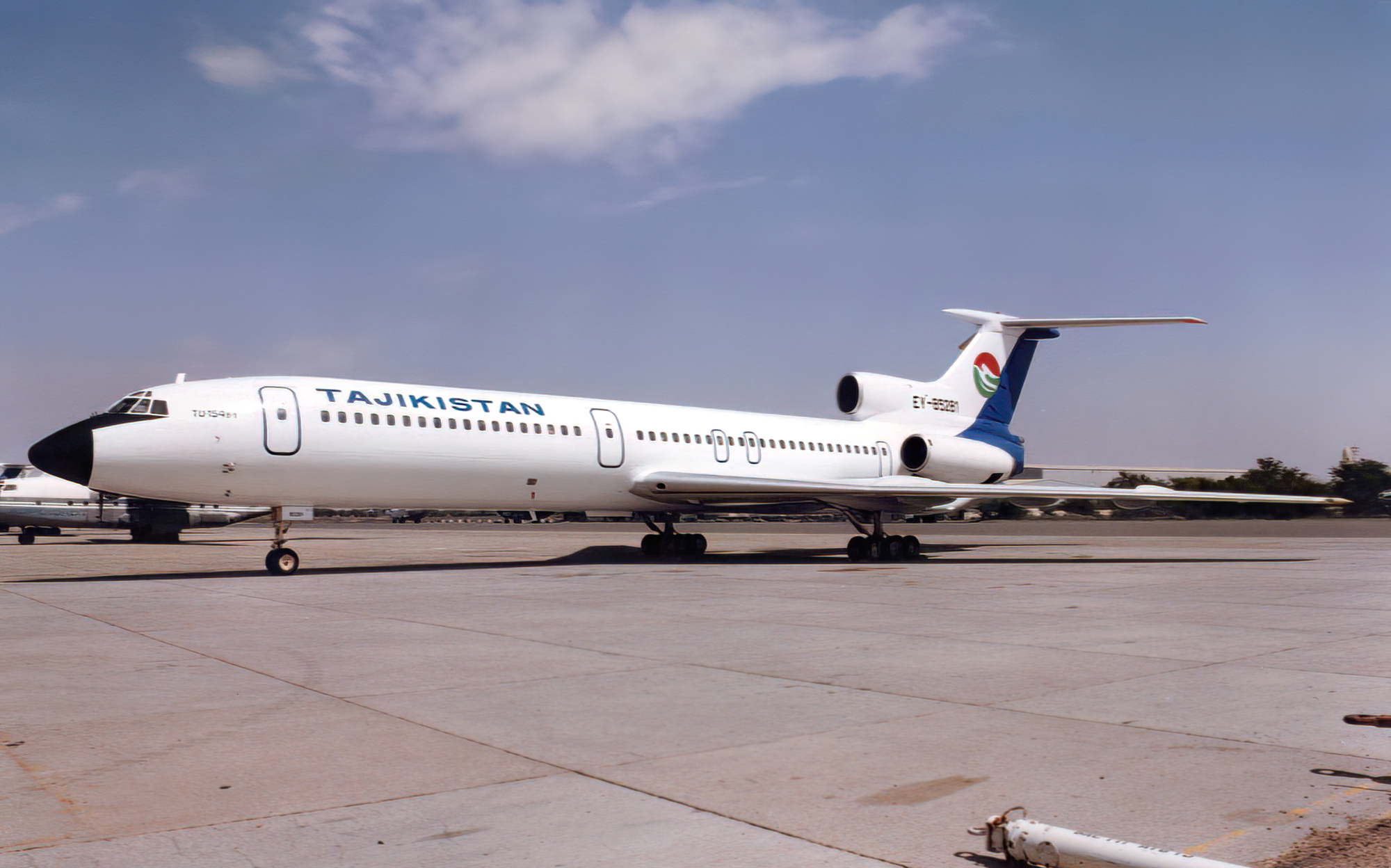
- EY-85281, the aircraft involved in the accident, seen in 1996
- Aircraft type: Tupolev Tu-154B-1
- Operator: Tajikistan Airlines
- IATA flight No.: 7J3183
- ICAO flight No.: TJK3183
- Call sign: TAJIKAIR 3183
- Registration: EY-85281
- Flight origin: Khujand Airport, Tajikistan
- Destination: Sharjah Airport, United Arab Emirates
- Occupants: 86
- Passengers: 79
- Crew: 7
- Fatalities: 85
- Injuries: 1
- Survivors: 1

Tajikistan Airlines Flight 3183 was a Tupolev Tu-154B-1 that crashed on 15 December 1997 on approach to Sharjah Airport in the United Arab Emirates. There was a sole survivor, the navigator, from a crew of seven and seventy-nine passengers. Investigators determined the cause of the accident was pilot error leading to controlled flight into terrain.

== Accident ==
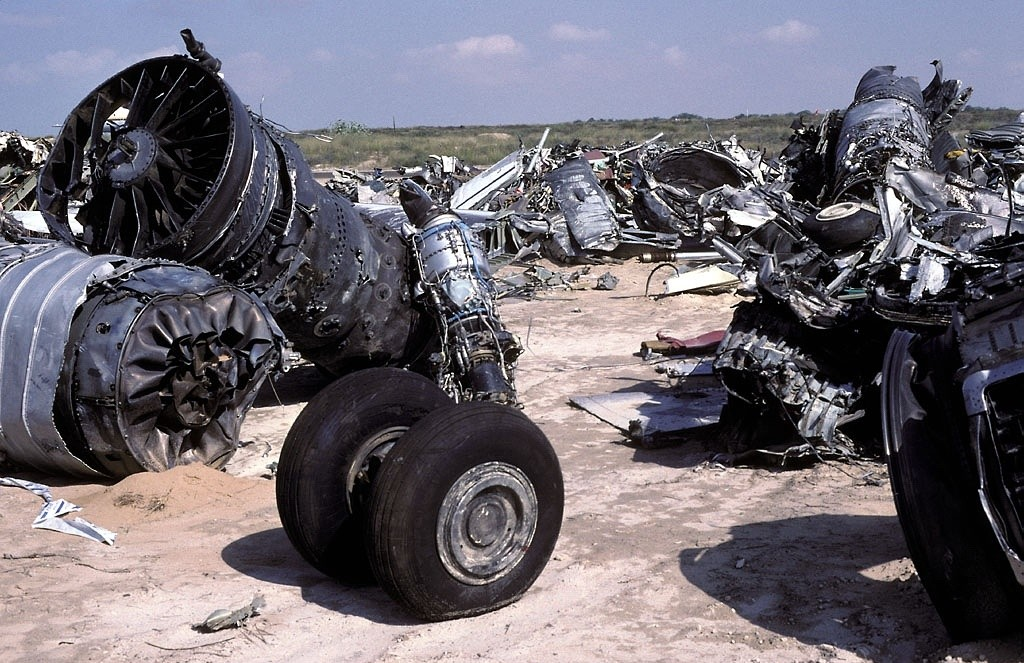
Another view of the scattered wreckage

The aircraft departed from Khujand Airport in the afternoon of 15 December 1997. Upon entering the airspace of the Emirate of Sharjah, the aircraft began to descend, experiencing turbulence on the way down. Preparing for final approach, the crew did not notice they were too low, and the aircraft crashed into the desert approximately 13 kilometres (8.1 mi) east of Sharjah Airport. All 79 passengers were killed (although one survived the crash, only to later die in hospital) as well as 6 of the 7 crew members. The sole survivor was identified as the flight navigator, 37-year-old Sergei Petrov.

=== Cause ===
According to the Aviation Safety Network, "The pilot descended below the assigned altitude and unintentionally continued a descent into terrain. Contributing factors were self-induced stress, slight turbulence and non-adherence to operating procedures". The president of the Tajikistan State Air Company, who had chartered the flight, claimed that an explosion had taken place on the aircraft prior to the crash, but there was no evidence to support this.

== Aftermath ==
The President of Uzbekistan, Islam Karimov, offered condolences to his Tajik counterpart Emomali Rahmon after the crash. All 85 victims except one (from Kerman, Iran) were from Khujand; the coffins were flown back there for burial. As many as 3,000 people gathered in the main square of Khujand for the mourning, while Tajik Prime Minister, Yahyo Azimov, spoke of "a dreadful tragedy". Nineteen (including 18 Tajiks and one Iranian) of the bodies were severely damaged and could not be identified; they were subsequently buried in a mass grave near Dushanbe International Airport.

== See also ==
- List of aviation accidents and incidents with a sole survivor
