= Asian Express Airline =

Tajikistani charter airline

IATA	ICAO	Call sign
KV	TXP	-
- Founded: 2011
- Ceased operations: 2019
- Hubs: Dushanbe International Airport
- Fleet size: 3
- Destinations: 5
- Headquarters: Dushanbe, Tajikistan
- Website: http://asian-express-airline.com/

Asian Express Airline was a Tajikistani charter airline based in Dushanbe.

== History ==
The airline began operations in 2011.

== Destinations ==
The carrier operated both domestic and international services from Dushanbe International Airport; as of August 2015, all of its international routes were flights solely to and from airports in Russia.

Russia

- Kaluga - Grabtsevo Airport
- Mineralnye Vody - Mineralnye Vody Airport
- Nizhny Novgorod - Nizhny Novgorod Airport
- Volgograd - Volgograd Airport

Tajikistan

- Dushanbe - Dushanbe Airport Hub
- Khujand - Khujand Airport
- Kulob - Kulob

== Fleet ==
The Asian Express Airline consisted of the following aircraftas of August 2015:

Asian Express Airline Fleet
Type	In Fleet	Notes
Airbus A320-200	1
Avro RJ100	2
Boeing 737-800	1
Total	4
