= 2024 in Tajikistan =

- Decades: 2000s; 2010s; 2020s
- See also: Other events of 2024; Timeline of Tajikistani history

This is a list of individuals and events related to Tajikistan in 2024.

== Incumbents ==
Photo	Post	Name
	President of Tajikistan	Emomali Rahmon
	Prime Minister of Tajikistan	Kokhir Rasulzoda

== Events ==
- 22 March – Crocus City Hall attack: Four Tajik men are charged with terrorism. They are brought to Basmanny District Court in Moscow, where they are ordered to be held in pre-trial detention until at least May 22.
- 19 June – The National Assembly of Tajikistan approves a bill banning hijab and children's celebrations for two major Islamic holidays.
- 26 July – 11 August: Tajikistan at the 2024 Summer Olympics
- 30 July – Kyrgyzstan says that 94% of its border with Tajikistan has been agreed upon by officials from both countries.

== Deaths ==
- 9 January – Vazgen Manasyan, 65, football player (Pamir Dushanbe, Vorskla Poltava, national team) and manager.

== See also ==
- Outline of Tajikistan
- Index of Tajikistan-related articles
- List of Tajikistan-related topics
- History of Tajikistan
