= Karomatullohi Mirzo =

Tajikistani writer (1942–2025)

Karomatullohi Mirzo (Tajik: Кароматуллоҳи Мирзо; 25 April 1942 – 20 October 2025) was a Tajik writer.

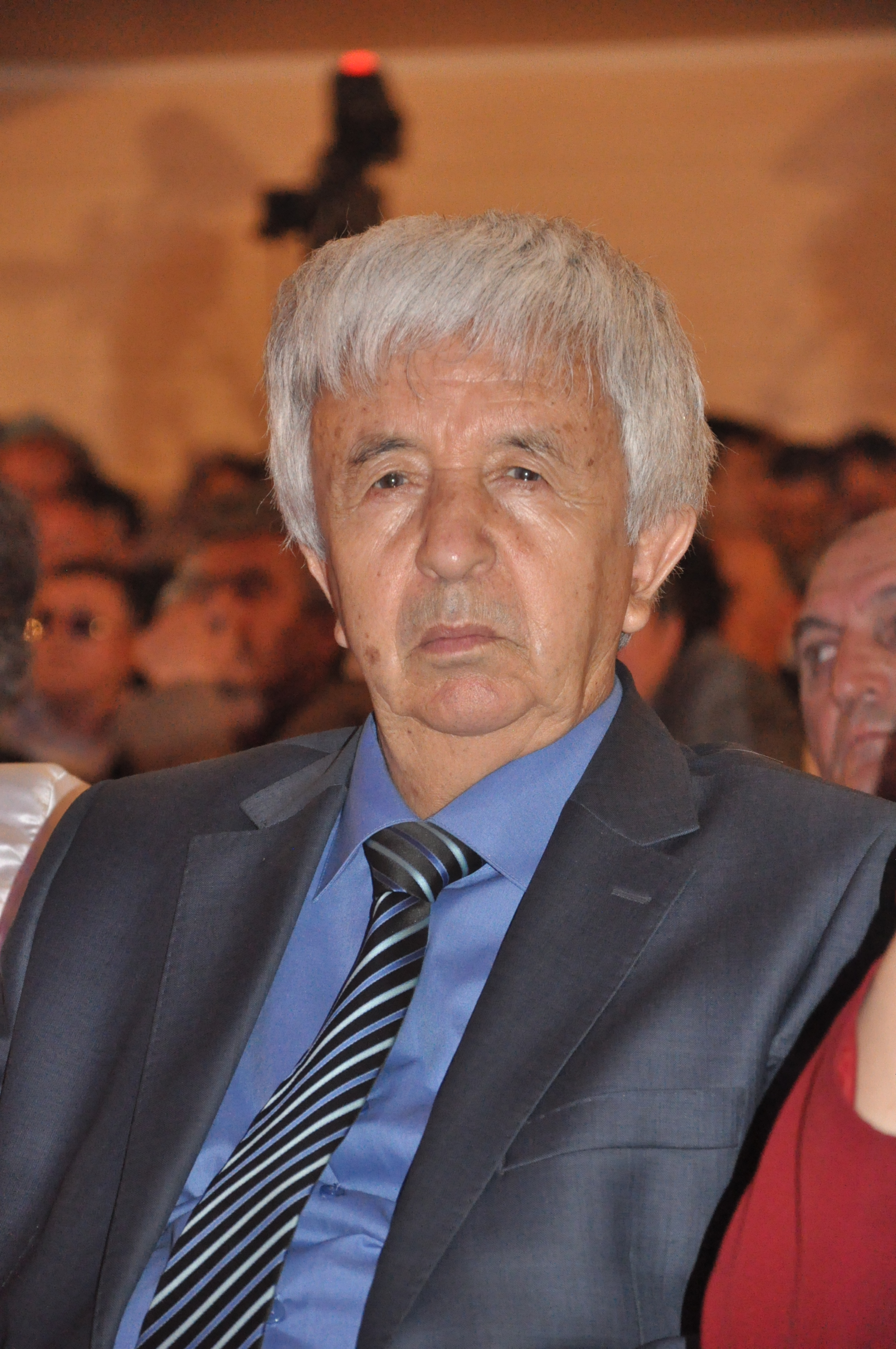
Karomatullohi Mirzo

== Life and career ==
Mirzo was born in Nilkon, Rudaki on 25 April 1942. In 1963, he graduated from the Faculty of History and Philology of the Dushanbe State Pedagogical Institute. He worked for a number of newspapers, including "Pioneer of Tajikistan" ("Anboz"), "Komsomol of Tajikistan" ("Youth of Tajikistan"), "Soviet Tajikistan" ("Republic"), editor-in-chief and director of the publishing house "Adib" (1990–2004). From 2007, he was the editor-in-chief of the weekly "Literature and Art".

In 2004, he was appointed head of the information and analytical department of the Executive Office of the President of the Republic of Tajikistan, chairman of the Prose Council of the Union of Writers of Tajikistan, and a member of several influential republican committees, organizations, and commissions. He was a member of the Union of Writers of Tajikistan from 1982.

He wrote several books about the Tajikistani Civil War, one of which was adapted into a television series.

Mirzo died on 20 October 2025, at the age of 82.
