= Nur Tabar =

Tajik writer and politician (1941–2022)

- Нур Табар

Member of the Supreme Soviet of the Tajik Soviet Socialist Republic
- In office 1987–1990

Personal details
- Born: 15 July 1941 Kofarnihon District, Tajik SSR, USSR
- Died: 15 August 2022 (aged 81) Dushanbe, Tajikistan
- Party: Communist Party of Tajikistan (until 1991)
- Education: Tajik National University
- Occupation: Writer

Nur Tabar (Tajik: Нур Табар; 15 July 1941 – 15 August 2022) was a Tajik politician. A member of the Communist Party, he served on the Supreme Soviet of the Tajik Soviet Socialist Republic from 1987 to 1990.

Tabar died in Dushanbe on 15 August 2022, at the age of 81.
