= Valeriy Gorbach =

Tajikistani footballer (1968–2022)

Personal information
- Full name: Valeriy Filippovich Gorbach
- Date of birth: 11 August 1968
- Place of birth: Zarafshan, Uzbek SSR, Soviet Union
- Date of death: 5 January 2022 (aged 53)
- Height: 1.82 m (6 ft 0 in)
- Position: Defender

Senior career*
| Years | Team | Apps | (Gls) |
| 1987 | FC Zarafshan Navoi | 34 | (0) |
| 1990–1991 | FC Nuravshon Bukhara | 72 | (1) |
| 1992–1996 | FC Fakel Voronezh | 142 | (5) |
| 1997–2002 | FC Lokomotiv Liski | 158 | (12) |

International career
| 1997 | Tajikistan | 1 | (0) |
- * Club domestic league appearances and goals

Valeriy Filippovich Gorbach (Russian: Валерий Филиппович Горбач; 11 August 1968 – 5 January 2022) was a Tajikistani footballer who played as a defender. His sole international match came in June 1997 against Turkmenistan. He died from heart failure at the age of 53.
