= Alisher Mirzonabot =

Tajik politician (1980–2026)

- Алишер Мирзонабот

Deputy Chairman of the National Assembly
- In office 16 December 2022 – 17 June 2026

Member of the National Assembly
- In office 26 August 2022 – 17 June 2026

Personal details
- Born: 27 August 1980 Rushon District, Gorno-Badakhshan AO, Tajik SSR, USSR
- Died: 17 June 2026 (aged 45) Darvoz District, Gorno-Badakhshan, Tajikistan
- Education: Academy of the Border Service of the National Security Committee
- Profession: Politician

Alisher Khudoberdi Mirzonabot (Tajik: Алишер Худобердӣ Мирзонабот; 27 August 1980 – 17 June 2026) was a Tajik politician who was a deputy of the National Assembly (2022–2026).

Mirzonabot also served as the head of the Gorno-Badakhshan from 5 November 2021 until his death.

Mirzonabot died in a traffic collision on 17 June 2026, at the age of 45.
