= Ramit State Nature Reserve =

Nature reserve in Vahdat district, Tajikistan

Coordinates: 38°47′00″N 69°21′00″E

Ramit State Nature Reserve (Russian: Государственный природный заповедник «Рамит»; Tajik: Мамнӯъгоҳи давлатии табии Ромит) is situated in Tajikistan north east of Dushanbe. It consist of 16139 ha mountains and forests.

The snow leopard is found in the reserve. Bukharan markhors (Capra falconeri heptneri), endangered goat-antelopes, are kept in enclosures and released in the wild.

In 2025, the reserve was designated as a biosphere reserve by UNESCO.
