= Khorog Airport =

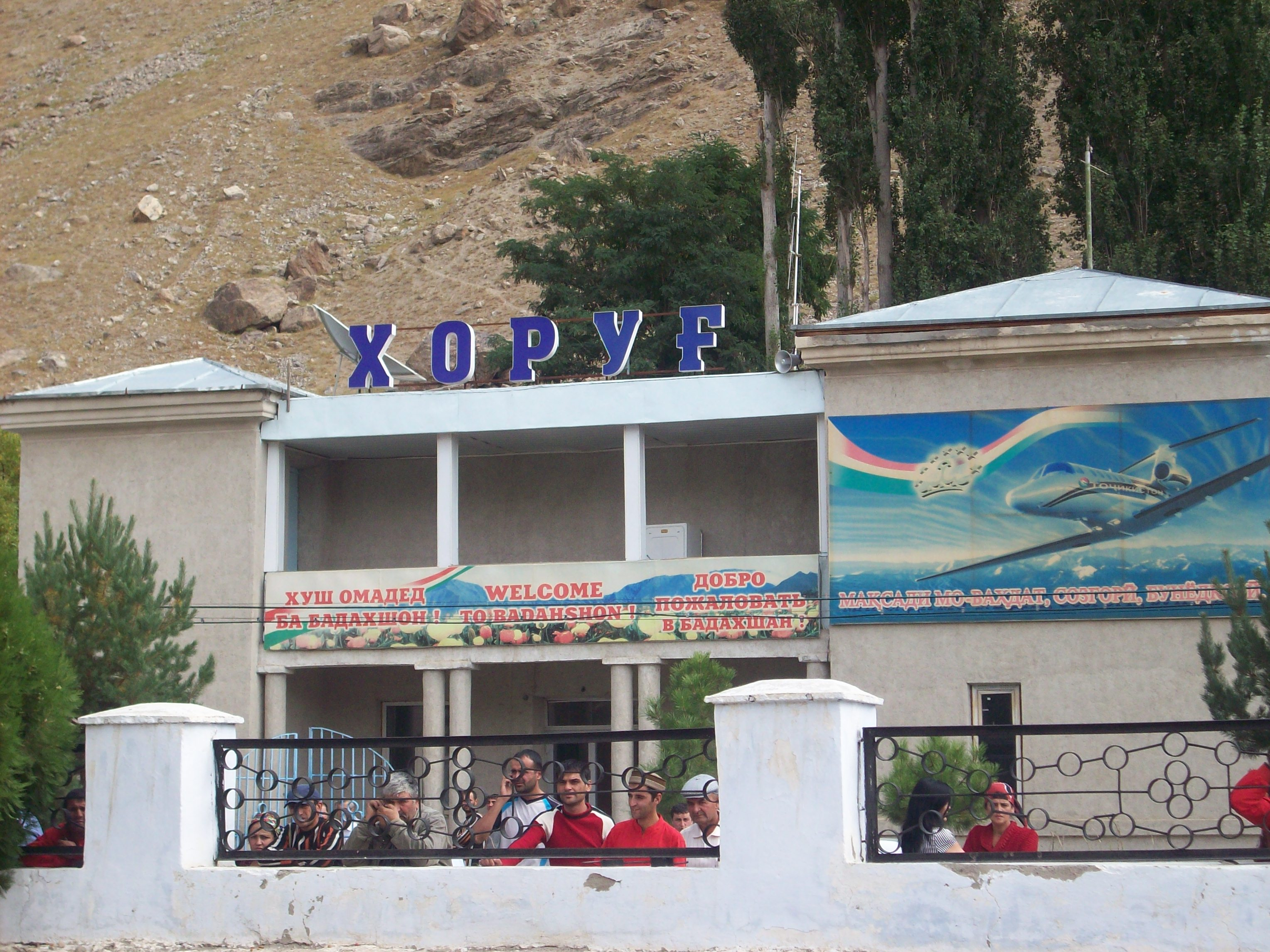
- IATA: none; ICAO: UTOD

Summary
- Airport type: Public
- Operator: Government
- Serves: Khorog, Tajikistan
- Elevation AMSL: 6,700 ft (2,000 m)
- Coordinates: 37°30′08″N 071°30′48″E

Map
- Location of airport in Tajikistan

Runways
Direction	Length		Surface
Direction	m	ft	Surface
16/34	1,840	6,036	Asphalt
- Source: DAFIF

Khorog Airport (Russian: Аэропорт «Хорог»; Tajik: Фурудгоҳи Хоруғ), (ICAO: UTOD) is an airport serving Khorog (also spelled Khorugh), a city in the Gorno-Badakhshan Autonomous Province in Tajikistan.

== History ==
Tajik Air resumed flights on the Dushanbe – Khorog – Dushanbe route from September 30, 2024. The flights operate three times a week on an AN-28 aircraft. The flight time from Dushanbe to Khorog is 1 hour and 10 minutes.

== Facilities and aircraft ==
The airport resides at an elevation of 6,700 feet (2,042 m) above mean sea level. It has one runway designated 16/34 with an asphalt surface measuring 1,840 by 49 metres (6,037 ft × 161 ft). Aga Khan Foundation has plans to build a new runway at the airport.

== Airlines and destinations ==
Airlines	Destinations
Tajik Air	Dushanbe
