= Qohir Rasulzoda =

Prime Minister of Tajikistan since 2013

- Қоҳир Расулзода
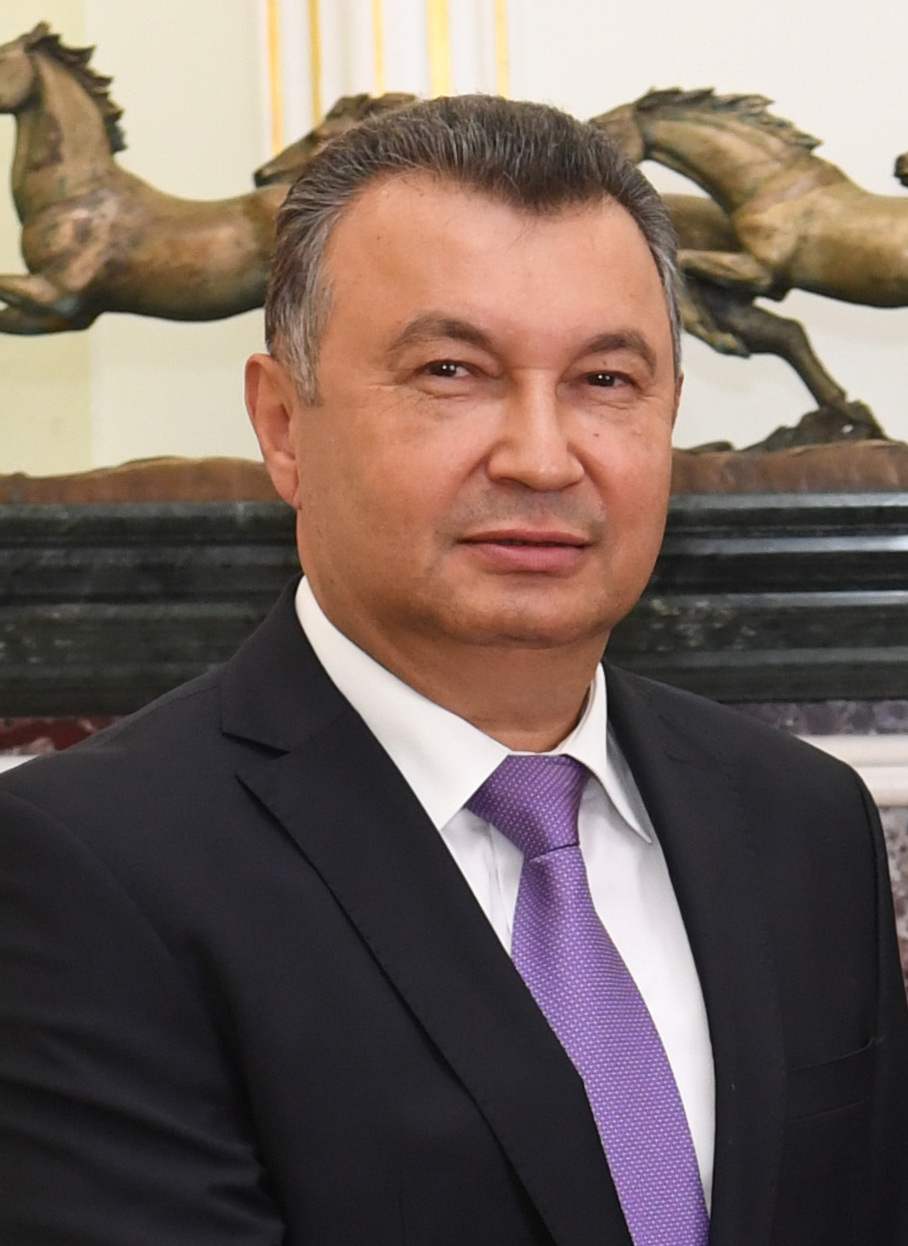
- Rasulzoda in 2023

8th Prime Minister of Tajikistan
- Incumbent
- Assumed office 23 November 2013
- President: Emomali Rahmon
- Deputy: Davlatali Said
- Preceded by: Oqil Oqilov

Personal details
- Born: 8 March 1961 (age 65) Ghafurov, Tajik SSR, Soviet Union (now Tajikistan)
- Party: People's Democratic Party
- Education: Agricultural University of Tajikistan

Qohir Rasulzoda (Note: Tajik: Қоҳир Расулзода) (born Abduqohir Abdurasulovich Nazirov, (Note: Tajik: Абдуқохир Абдурасулович Назиров) 8 March 1961) is a Tajikistani politician who is serving as the Prime Minister of Tajikistan since 23 November 2013. He is a member of the People's Democratic Party of Tajikistan.

== Political career ==
He was born as Abduqohir Abdurasulovich Nazirov on 8 March 1961 in the town of Kistakuz in Ghafurov District of Sughd Region of the Tajik SSR. In 1982, he graduated from the Agricultural University of Tajikistan, specializing in hydraulic engineering. Then Nazirov worked as engineer of the production department, chief engineer, chief of PMK-4, the head of the enterprise "Tajiksovskhozstroy."

From January 2000 to December 2006, he served as minister for melioration and water resources.

In 2008, he graduated from the Russian Presidential Academy of National Economy and Public Administration with a degree in Technical Science. On 2 December 2006 he was made the Acting Head of Sughd Province, becoming the permanent leader of the province on 27 February 2007. In May 2007, he changed his name to Qohir Rasulzoda under President Emomali Rahmon's law.

In December 2007 and in April 2010, Rasulzoda was elected as the first deputy chairman of National Assembly of the Supreme Assembly of Tajikistan. From February 27, 2007 – November 23, 2013, he was also Head of the Sughd Region.

On 23 November 2013 Qohir Rasulzoda was appointed Prime Minister of Tajikistan, replacing Oqil Oqilov.

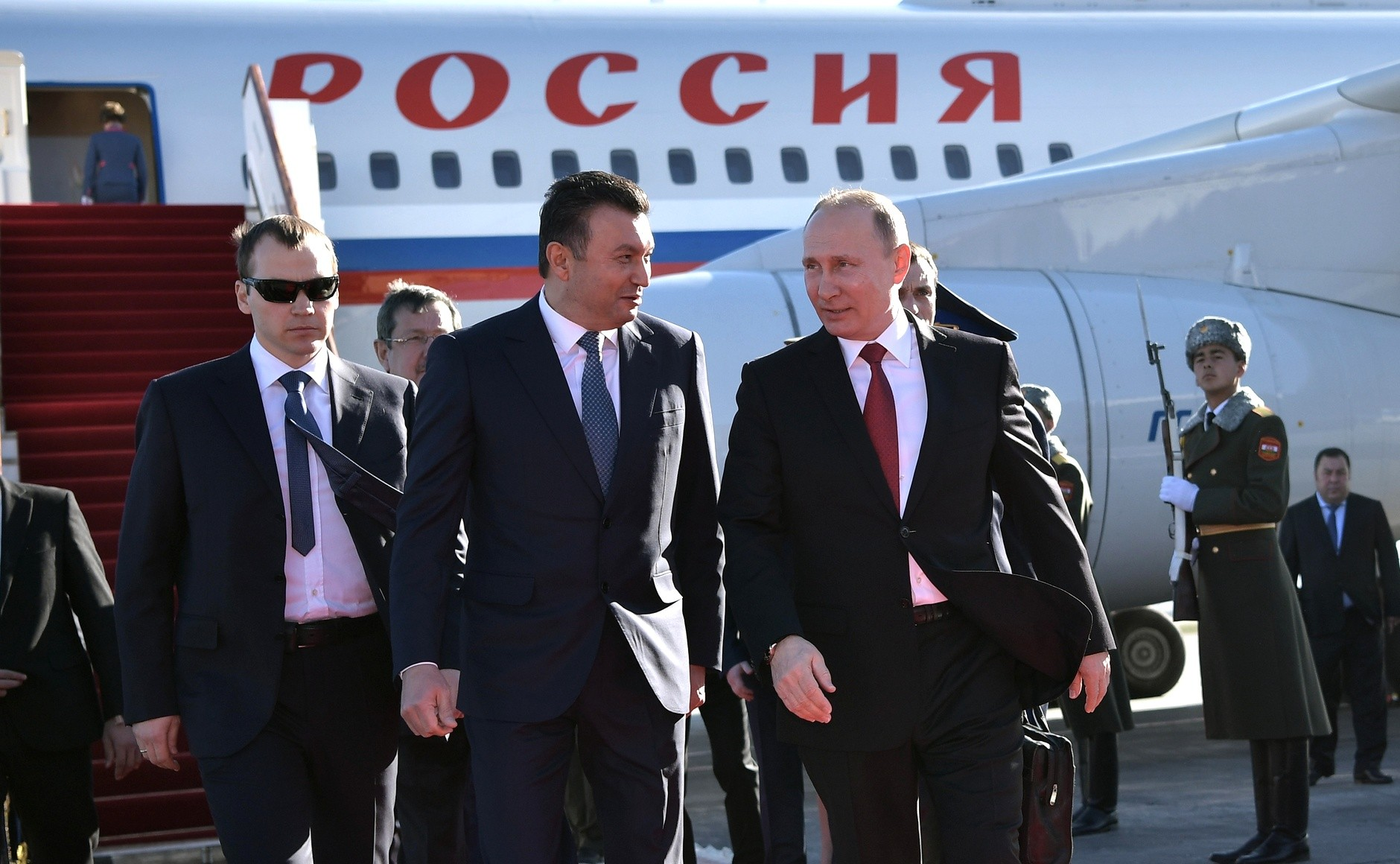
Rasulzoda with Vladimir Putin at the Airport in Tajikistan in 2017

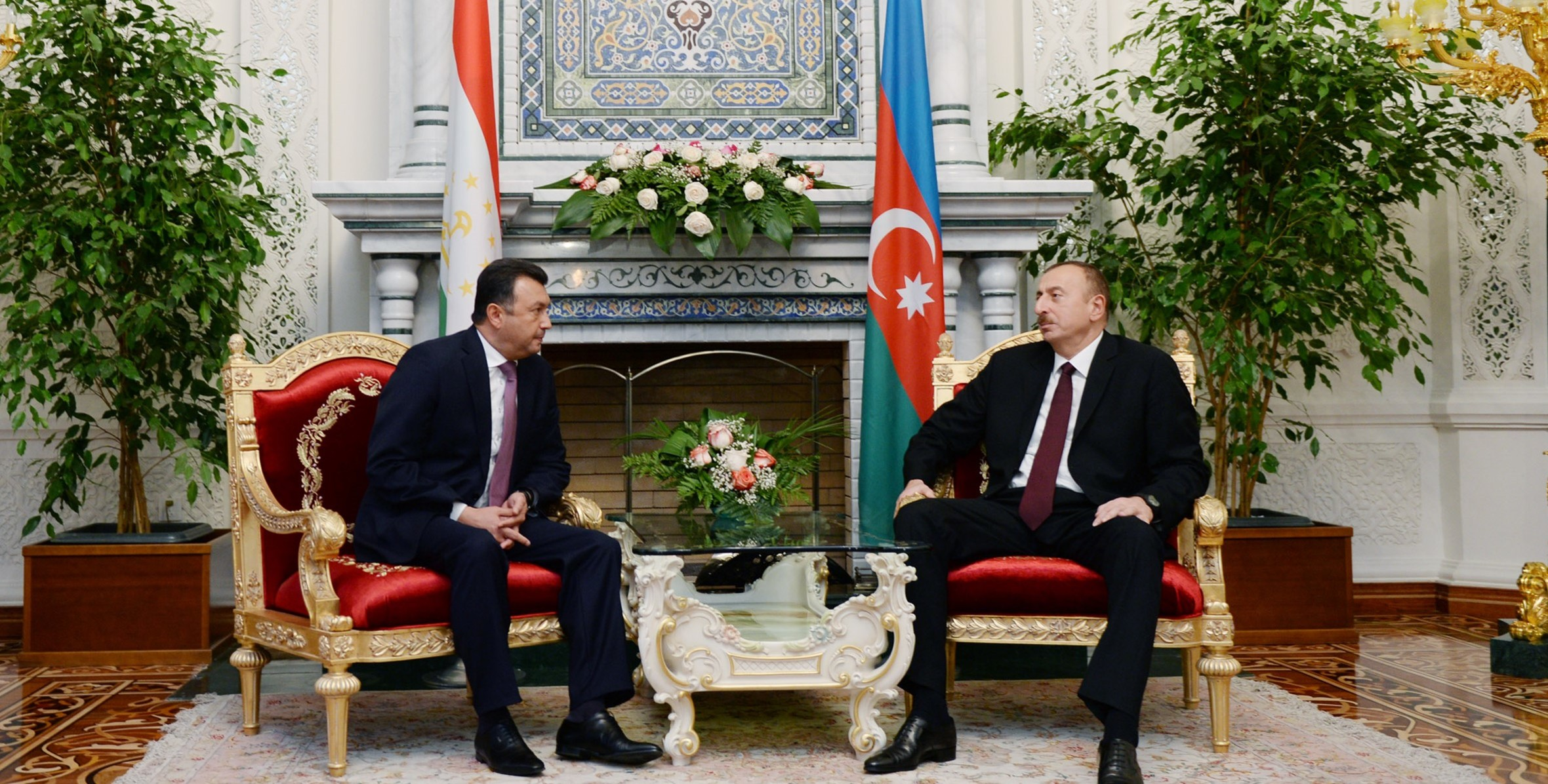
Rasulsoda with Ilham Aliyev in 2014

== Personal life ==
His wife, Ikhbolkhon Nazirova, owns two properties worth $1.4 million in Dubai. She also owns several properties in Tajikistan. Their daughter, Farangez Azimova, owns a villa in Dubai worth $5.4 million.

The source of the couple's wealth is unknown, as she has no known income and Rasulzoda, as a public official for 24 years, has been barred from engaging in commercial activities.

== Awards ==
- Honored Worker of Tajikistan
- Order of the Defense Assistance Society of the CIS "For Outstanding Services" (2009)
- Order "For Selfless Service" (Uzbekistan, 2018)
- Order of Honor (Russia, 30 December 2022)

== Notes ==
Political offices
Preceded by Oqil Oqilov	Prime Minister of Tajikistan; 2013–present	Incumbent
