= History of Tajikistan =

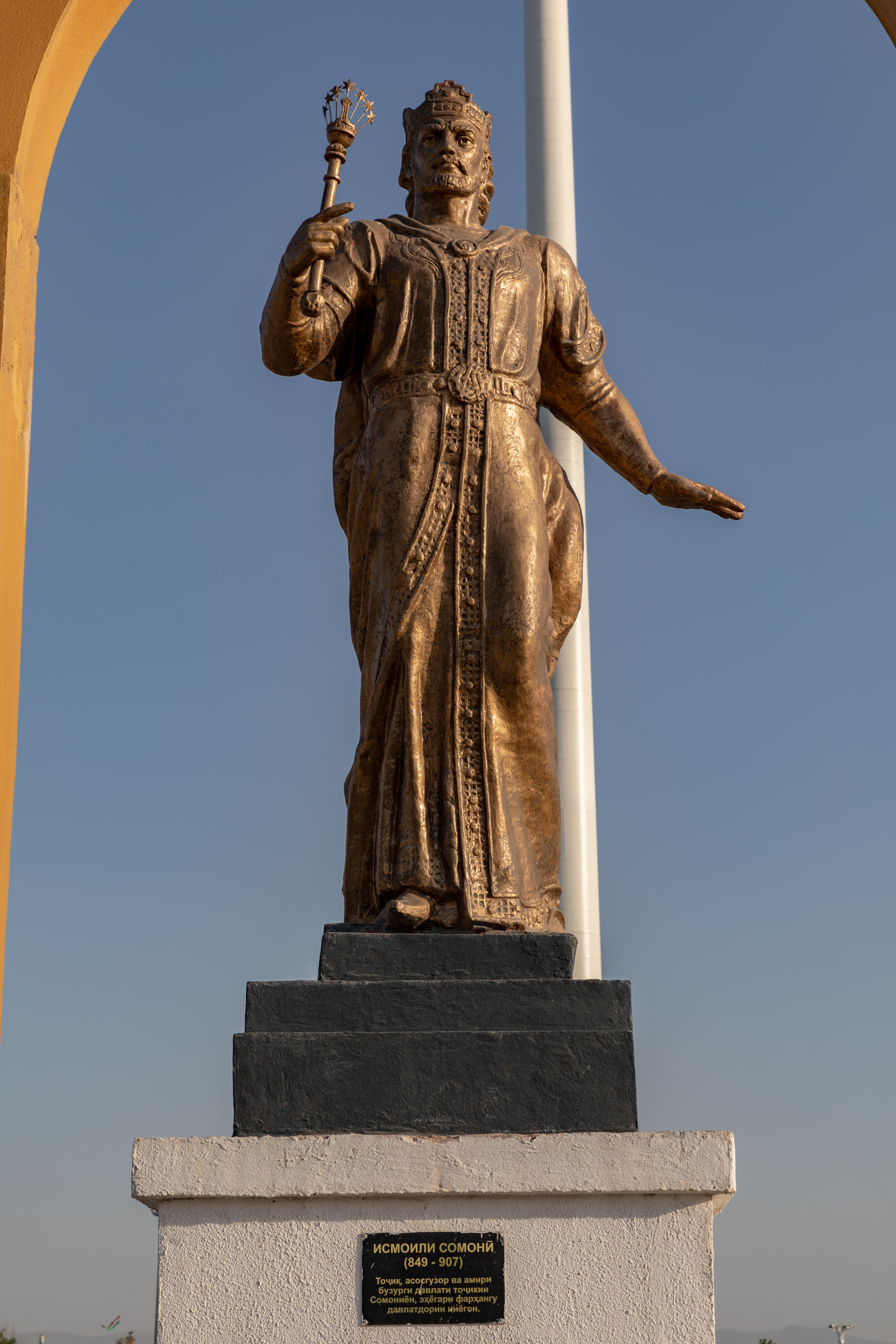
The statue of Ismail Samani, a symbol of the history and culture of the Tajik people, in the city of Dushanbe.

The Tajik people came under Russian rule in the 1860s. The Basmachi revolt broke out in the wake of the Russian Revolution of 1917 and was quelled in the early 1920s, during the Russian Civil War. In 1924, Tajikistan became an Autonomous Soviet Socialist Republic within Uzbekistan, known as the Tajik ASSR. In 1929, Tajikistan was made one of the constituent republics of the Soviet Union—the Tajik Soviet Socialist Republic (Tajik SSR)—and retained this status until gaining independence in 1991, following the dissolution of the Soviet Union.

Since then, it has experienced three changes in government and the Tajikistani Civil War. A peace agreement among rival factions was signed in 1997.

== Antiquity (600 BC – 710 AD) ==
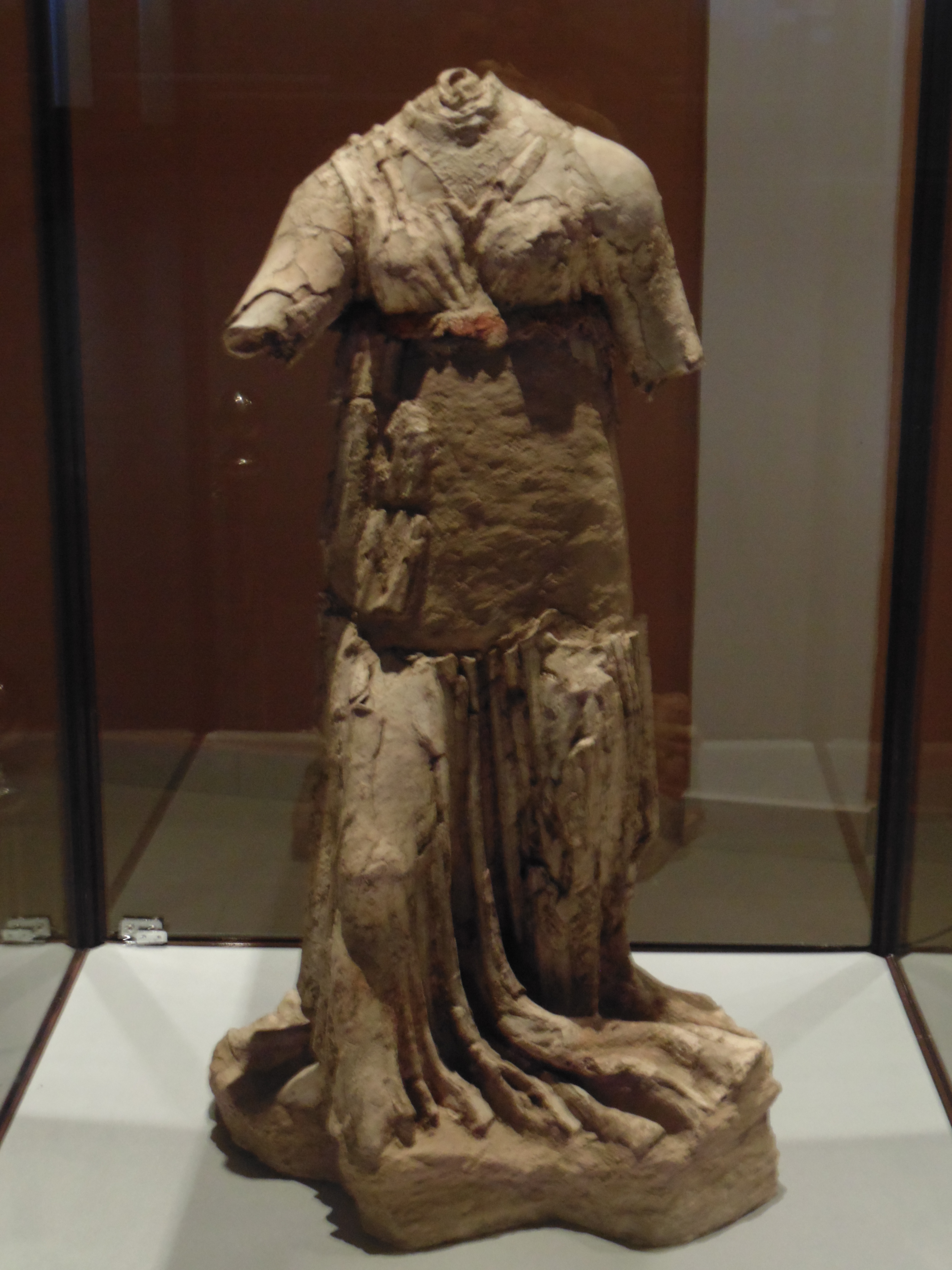
Sculpture of a woman from Takht-i Sangin, 3rd–2nd century BCE, Tajikistan.

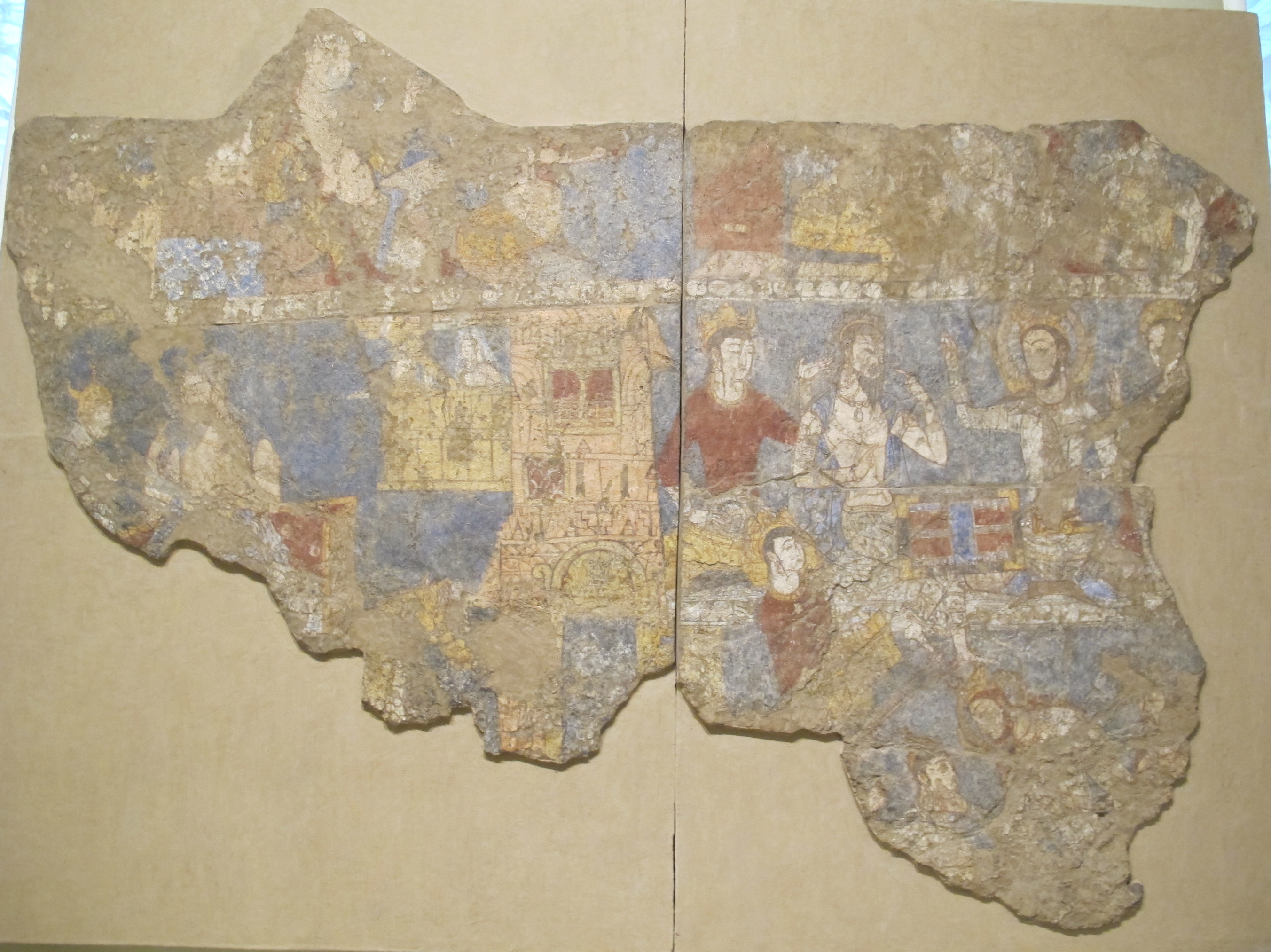
A Sogdian wall mural from the ruins of an aristocratic home at the archaeological site of Panjakent, showing Sogdian men playing a board game, 8th century

In ancient times, Tajikistan was bordered to the north by the Scytho-Siberian world. Sogdiana, Bactria, Merv, and Khorezm were the four principal divisions of ancient Central Asia inhabited by the ancestors of the present-day Tajiks of Tajikistan. Today, Tajiks are found only in historic Bactria and Sogdiana. Merv is now inhabited by the Turkomans, and Khorezm by Uzbeks and Kazakhs. Sogdiana consisted of the Zeravshan and Kashka-Darya river valleys. Currently, two of the surviving peoples of Sogdiana who speak dialects of the Sogdian language are the Yaghnobis and the Shugnanis.

Tajikistan was part of the Bactria-Margiana Archaeological Complex in the Bronze Age, candidate for Proto-Indo-Iranian or Proto-Iranian culture. Bactria was located in northern Afghanistan (present-day Afghan Turkestan) between the mountain range of the Hindu Kush and the Amu Darya (Oxus) River and some areas of current south Tajikistan. During different periods, Bactria was a center of various Kingdoms or Empires, and is probably where Zoroastrianism originated. The "Avesta"—the holy book of Zoroastrianism—was written in the old-Bactrian dialect; it is also thought that Zoroaster was most likely born in Bactria.

Some authors have also suggested that in the 7th and 6th century BCE parts of modern Tajikistan, including territories in the Zeravshan valley, formed part of Kambojas, which were referenced in the Mahabharata epic as the Parama Kamboja, before it became part of the Achaemenid Empire.Linguistic evidence, combined with ancient literary and inscriptional evidence suggests the Kambojas originally emigrated from Central Asia.

=== Achaemenid Period (550 BC – 329 BC) ===
During the Achaemenid period, Sogdiana and Bactria were part of the Achaemenid Empire. Sogdians and Bactrians held important positions in the administration and military of the Achaemenid Empire.

=== Hellenistic Period (329 BC – 90 BC) ===
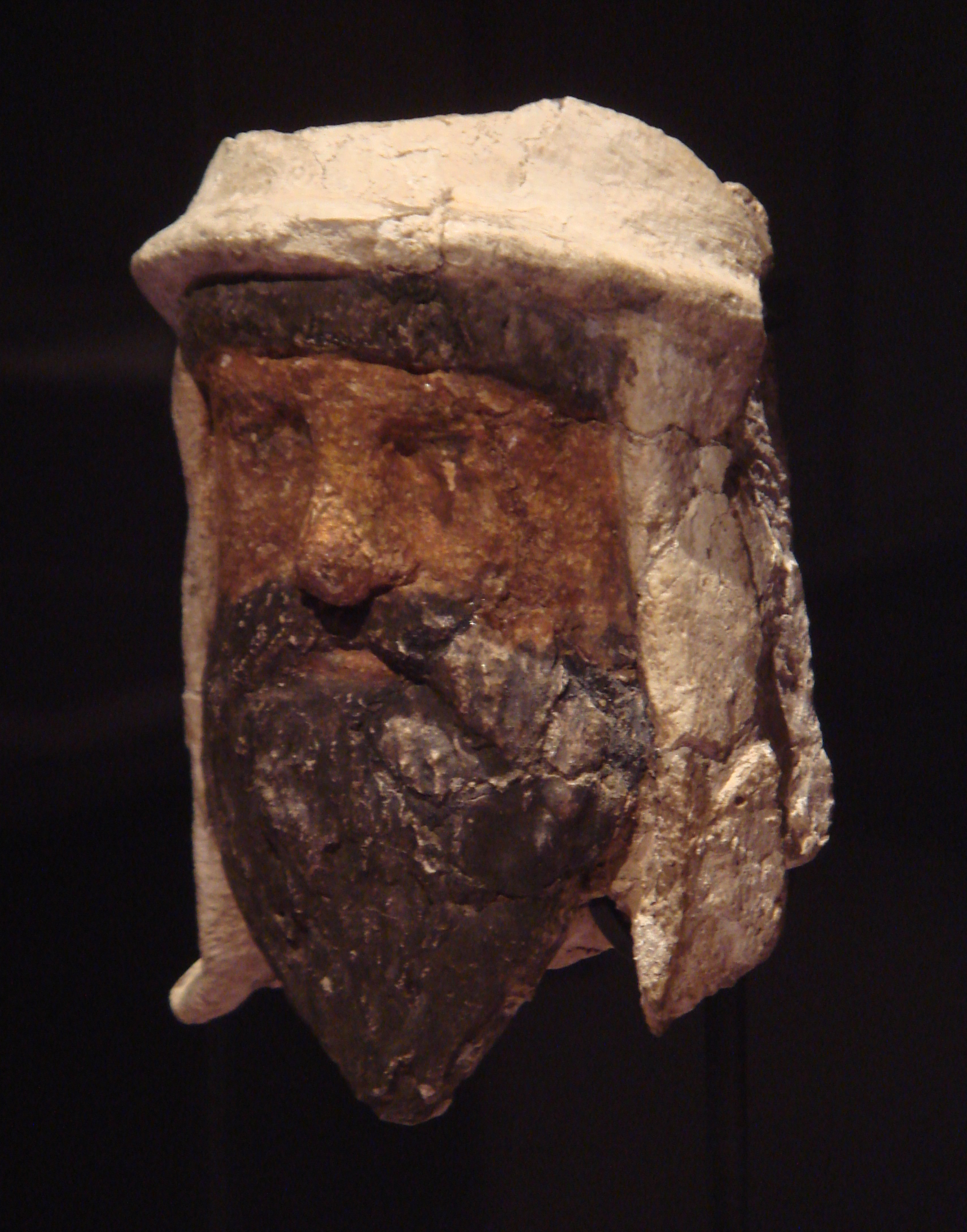
Painted clay and alabaster head of a Zoroastrian priest wearing a distinctive Bactrian-style headdress, Takhti-Sangin, Tajikistan, Greco-Bactrian kingdom, 3rd–2nd century BC.

After the Achaemenid Empire was defeated by Alexander the Great, Bactria, Sogdiana, and Merv—having been part of the Persian Empire—had to defend themselves against new invaders. In fact, the Macedonians faced very stiff resistance under the leadership of the Sogdian ruler Spitamenes. Alexander the Great managed to marry Roxana, the daughter of a local ruler, and thereby inherited his land. Following Alexander's brief occupation, the Hellenistic successor states of the Seleucids and Greco-Bactrians controlled the area for another 200 years, in what is known as the Greco-Bactrian Kingdom. During the period from 90 BC to 30 BC, the Yuezhi destroyed the last Hellenistic successor states and, together with the Tokhari (to whom they were closely related), created the Kushan Empire around AD 30.

=== Kushan Empire (30 BC – 410 AD) ===
For another 400 years, until AD 410, the Kushan Empire was a major power in the region, along with the Roman Empire, the Parthian Empire, and Han China. Notable contact was made with local peoples when envoys of the Han dynasty journeyed to this area in the 2nd century BC. At the end of the Kushan period, the Empire became much smaller and had to defend itself against the powerful Sassanid Empire, which had replaced the Parthian Empire. The famous Kushan king Kanishka promoted Buddhism, and during this time Buddhism was exported from Central Asia to China.

=== The Sassanids, Hephthalites, and Gokturks (224–710) ===
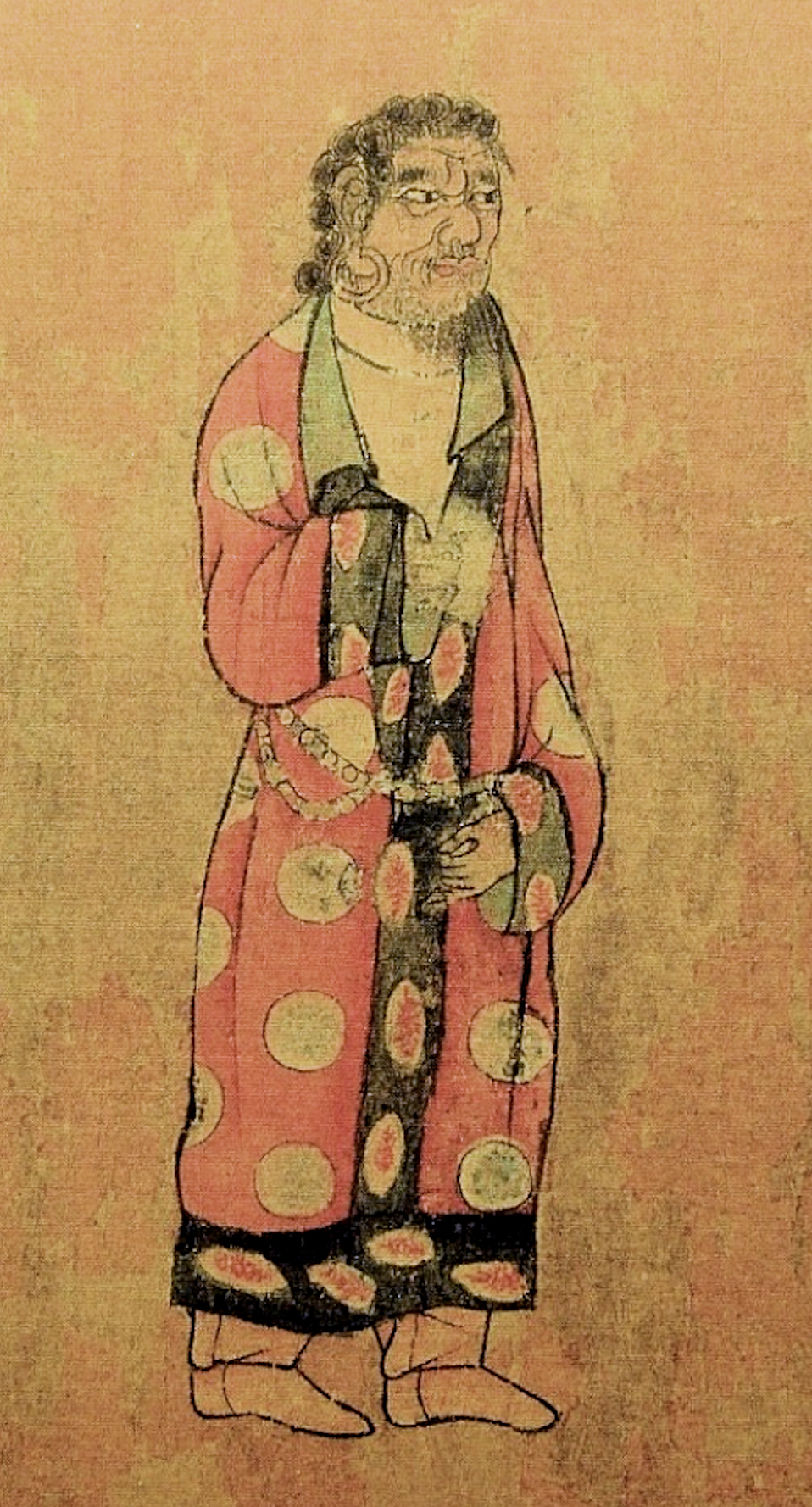
Ambassador to the Tang dynasty, coming from Kumedh (胡密丹), Tajikistan. Wanghuitu (王会图) circa 650 CE.

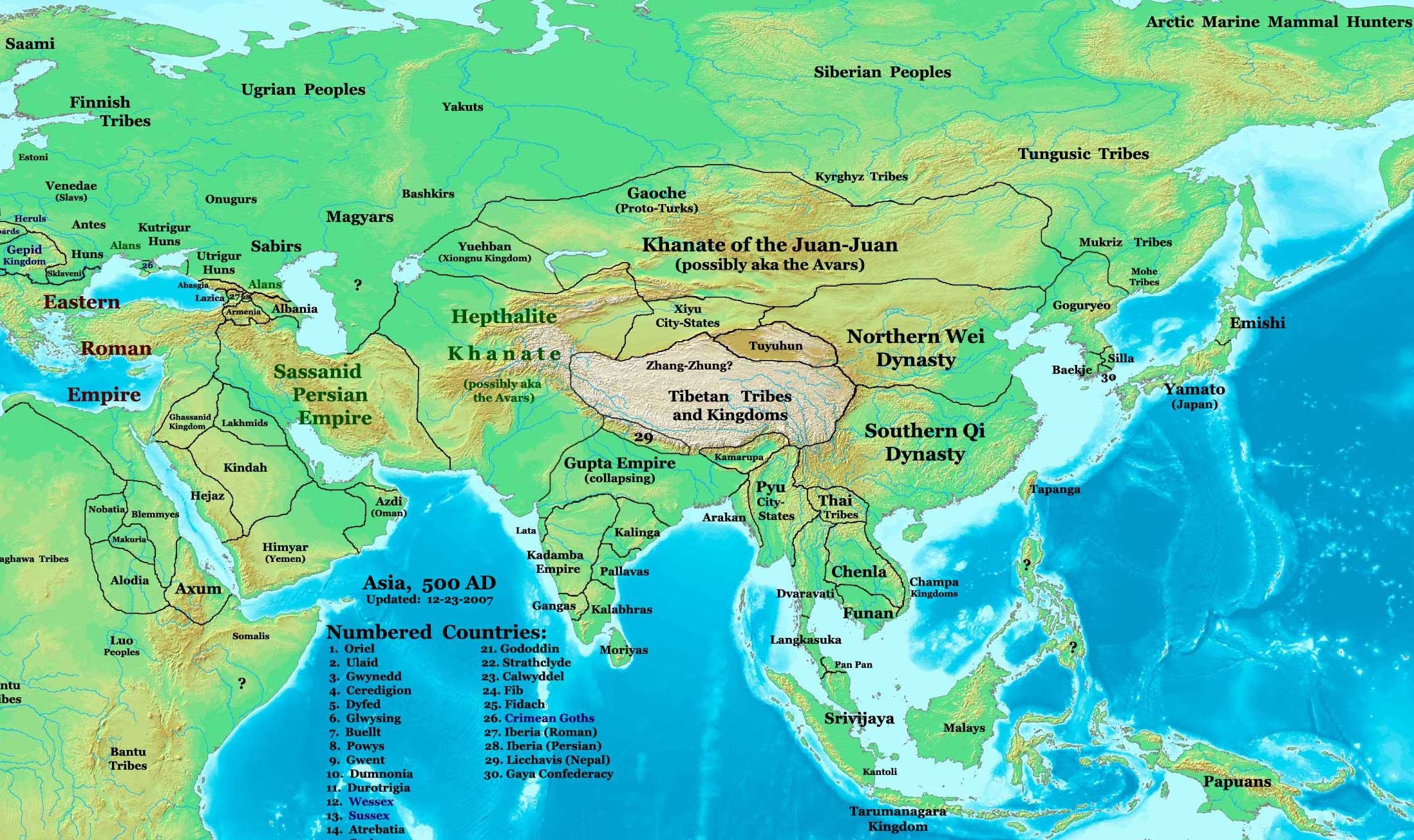
Asia in 500, showing the Hephthalite Khanate at its greatest extent

The Sassanids once controlled much of what is now Tajikistan, but lost the territory to the Hephthalites (possibly also of Iranian descent) during the reign of Peroz I.

The Hephthalites created a powerful empire that succeeded in making Iran a tributary state around 483–485. Peroz, the Shah of Persia, fought three wars against the Hephthalites. During the first war, he was captured by the Hephthalite army and later released after the Byzantine emperor paid a ransom for him. During the second war, Peroz was captured again and was released after paying a huge contribution to the Hephthalite king. During the third war, Peroz was killed. The Hephthalites were subjugated in 565 by a combination of Sassanid and Kök-Turk forces. Subsequently, present-day Tajikistan was ruled by the Göktürks and the Sassanids. However, when the Sassanid Empire fell, the Turks kept control of Tajikistan, but later lost it to the Tang dynasty. They later managed to regain control of Tajikistan once again, only to lose it to the Arabs in 710.

== Medieval history (710–1506) ==
=== Arab Caliphate (710–867) ===
The Age of the Caliphs Muhammad, 622–632 Patriarchal Caliphate, 632–661 Umayyad Caliphate, 661–750

The Transoxiana principalities never formed a viable confederacy. Beginning in 651, the Arabs organised periodic marauding raids deep into the territory of Transoxiana, but it was not until the appointment of Ibn Qutaiba as Governor of Khorasan in 705, during the reign of Walid I, that the Caliphate adopted the policy of annexing the lands beyond the Oxus. In 715, the task of annexation was accomplished. The entire region thus came under the control of the Caliph and of Islam, but the Arabs continued to rule through local Soghdian kings and dihqans. The ascension of the Abbasids to rule the Caliphate (750–1258) opened a new era in the history of Central Asia. While their predecessors, the Umayyads (661–750), had been little more than leaders of a loose confederation of Arab tribes, the Abbasids set out to build a huge multi-ethnic centralized state that would emulate and perfect the Sassanian government machine. They gave the Near East and Transoxiana a unity that they had been lacking since the time of Alexander the Great.

=== Samanid Empire (819–999) ===
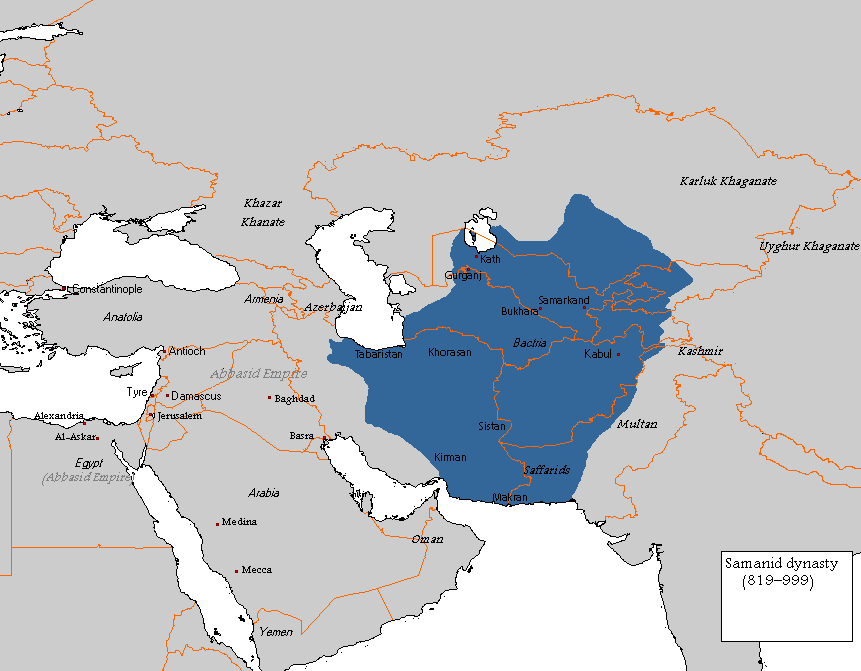
Samanid empire

The Samanid dynasty ruled (819–1005) in Khorasan (including eastern Iran and Transoxiana) and was founded by Saman Khuda. The Samanids were one of the first purely indigenous dynasties to rule in Persia after the Muslim Arab conquest. During the reign (892–907) of Saman Khuda's great-grandson, Ismail I (known as Ismail Samani), the Samanids expanded into Khorasan. In 900, Ismail defeated the Saffarids in Khorasan (in the area of present-day north-western Afghanistan and north-eastern Iran), while his brother was the governor of Transoxiana. Thus, Samanid rule was acclaimed over the combined regions. The cities of Bukhara (the Samanid capital) and Samarkand became centres of art, science, and literature; industries included pottery-making and bronze casting. After 950, Samanid power weakened, but was briefly revitalised under Nuh II, who ruled from 976 to 997. However, with the encroachment of Muslim Turks, the Samanids lost their domains south of the Oxus river, which were taken by the Ghaznavids. In 999, Bukhara was taken by the Qarakhanids. The Samanid Isma'il Muntasir (died 1005) tried to restore the dynasty (1000–1005), until he was assassinated by an Arab bedouin chieftain.

The attack of the Qarakhanid Turks ended the Samanid dynasty in 999, and dominance in Transoxiana passed to Turkic rulers.

=== Qarakhanids (999–1211) and Khwarezmshahs (1211–1218) ===
After the collapse of the Samanid dynasty, Central Asia became the battleground for many Asian invaders who came from the north-east.

=== Mongol rule (1218–1370) ===
The Mongol Empire swept through Central Asia, invaded the Khwarezmian Empire, and sacked the cities of Bukhara and Samarkand, looting and massacring people.

=== Timurid Empire (1370–1506) ===
Timur, founder of the Timurid Empire, was born on 8 April 1336 in Kesh, near Samarkand. He was a member of the Turkicised Barlas tribe, a Mongol subgroup that had settled in Transoxiana after taking part in the campaigns of Genghis Khan's son Chagatai in that region. Timur began his life as a bandit leader. During this period, he received an arrow wound to the leg, as a result of which he was nicknamed Timur-e Lang (in Dari) or Timur the Lame. Although the last Timurid ruler of Herat, Badi az Zaman, finally fell to the armies of the Uzbek Muhammad Shaibani Khan in 1506, the Timurid ruler of Ferghana, Zahir-ud-Din Babur, survived the collapse of the dynasty and re-established the Timurid dynasty in India in 1526, where they became known as the Mughals.

== Early modern history (1506–1868) ==
=== Shaybanid rule (1506–1598) ===
The Shaybanid state was divided into appanages between all male members (sultans) of the dynasty, who would designate the supreme ruler (Khan), the oldest member of the clan. The seat of the Khan was first Samarkand, the capital of the Timurids, but some of the Khans preferred to remain in their former appanages. Thus, Bukhara became the seat of the Khan for the first time under Ubaid Allah Khan (r. 1533–1539).

The period of political expansion and economic prosperity was short-lived. Soon after the death of Abdullah Khan II, the Shaibanid dynasty died out and was replaced by the Janid, or Astrakhanid (Ashtarkhanid), dynasty, another branch of the descendants of Jöchi, whose founder, Jani Khan, was related to Abdullah Khan II through his marriage to Abdullah Khan's sister. The Astrakhanids are also said to be connected to the Hashemites on account of Imam Quli Khan's status as a Sayyid. Their descendants today live in India. In 1709, the eastern part of the Khanate of Bukhara seceded and formed the Khanate of Kokand. Thus, the eastern part of present-day Tajikistan passed to the Khanate of Kokand, while the western part remained part of the Khanate of Bukhara.

=== Iranian and Bukharan rule (1740–1868) ===
In 1740, the Janid khanate was conquered by Nader Shah, the Afsharid ruler of Iran. The Janid khan Abu al Faiz retained his throne, becoming Nadir's vassal.

After the death of Nader Shah in 1747, the chief of the Manghit tribe of Uzbeks, Muhammad Rahim Biy Azaliq, overcame his rivals from other tribes and consolidated his rule over the Khanate of Bukhara. His successor, however, ruled in the name of puppet khans of Janid origin. In 1785, Shah Murad formalised the family's dynastic rule (Manghit dynasty), and the khanate became the Emirate of Bukhara.

== Russian and Soviet rule (1868–1991) ==
=== Russian vassalage (1868–1920) ===
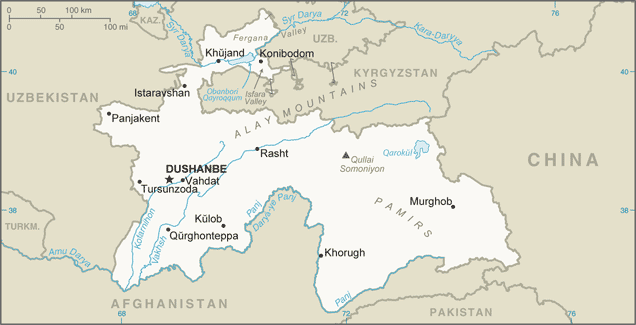
CIA map of Tajikistan

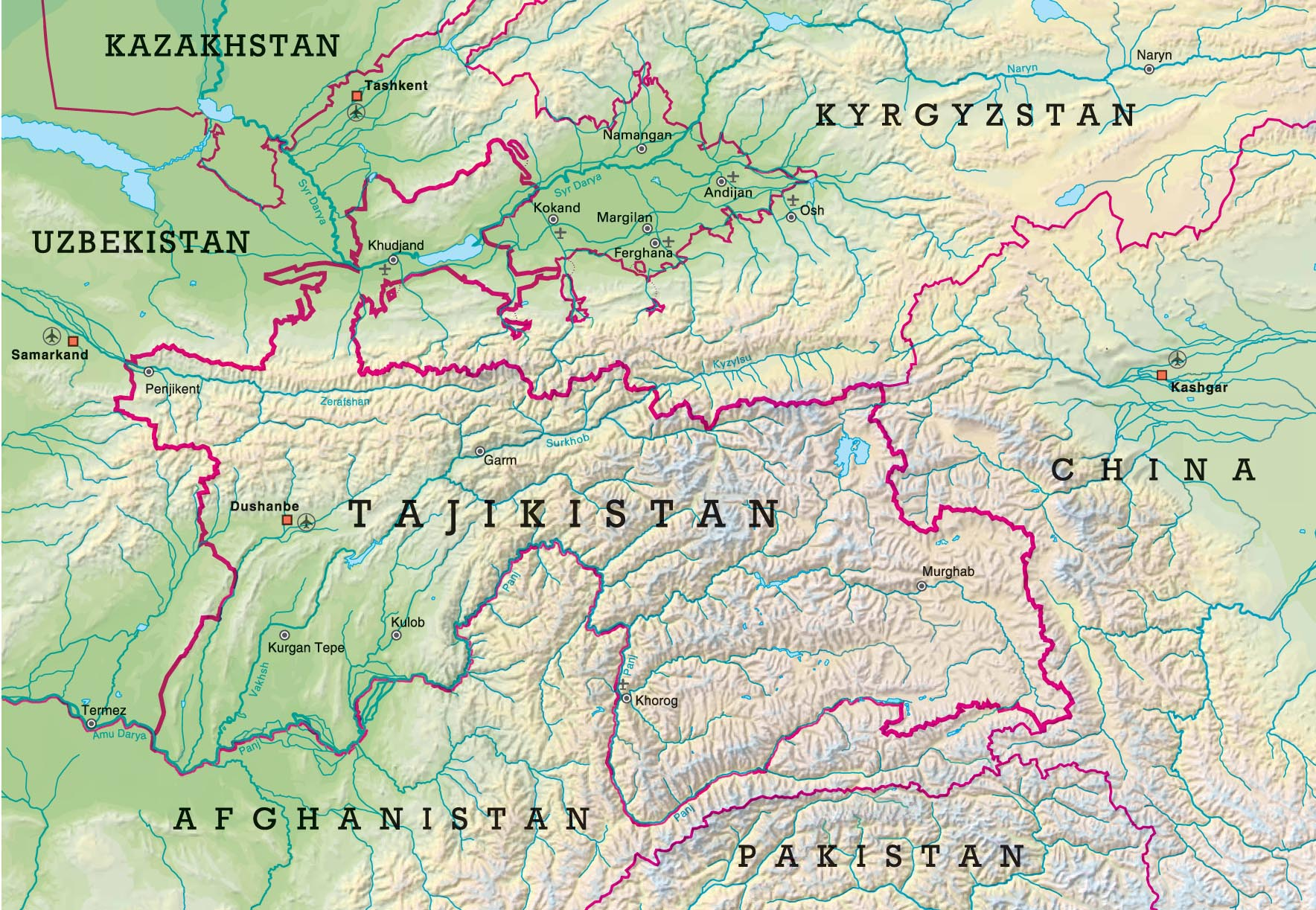
Map of Tajikistan

Russian imperialism drove the Russian Empire's conquest of Central Asia during the late 19th century, a period often associated with the Great Game. Between 1864 and 1885, Russia gradually assumed control over the entirety of Russian Turkestan. The territory that now constitutes Tajikistan had previously been under the sway of the Emirate of Bukhara and the Khanate of Kokand. Russian Turkestan extended from the present-day border with Kazakhstan in the north to the Caspian Sea in the west, and southwards to the frontier with Afghanistan. Following the capture of Tashkent in 1865, the Turkestan Governor-Generalship was established in 1867, with Konstantin Petrovich Von Kaufman appointed as its first Governor-General.

The expansion was motivated by Russia's economic interests and was connected with the American Civil War in the early 1860s, which severely interrupted the supply of cotton fibre to Russian industry and forced Russia to turn to Central Asia as an alternative source of cotton, as well as a market for Russian-made goods. In the 1870s, the Russian regime attempted to switch cultivation in the region from grain to cotton (a strategy later copied and expanded by the Soviets). By 1885, Tajikistan's territory was either ruled by the Russian Empire or by its vassal state, the Emirate of Bukhara; nevertheless, the Tajiks felt little Russian influence.

Owing to its vast size, large population and superior military capabilities, the Russian Empire encountered little difficulty in conquering the Tajik-inhabited regions. Fierce resistance was met only at Jizzakh and Ura-Tyube, as well as during the siege of the Russian garrison in Samarkand in 1868 by forces from Shahr-e Sabz and local inhabitants. The army of the Emirate of Bukhara was decisively defeated in three major battles. Consequently, on 18 June 1868, Emir Mozaffar al-Din (r. 1860–1885) signed a peace treaty with Konstantin Von Kaufman, the Governor-General of Russian Turkestan. Under the terms of the treaty, Samarkand and the upper Zeravshan Valley were annexed by Russia, and the emirate was opened to Russian merchants. The emir retained his throne as a Russian vassal; with Russian assistance, he subsequently consolidated control over Shahr-e Sabz and the mountainous regions of the upper Zeravshan Valley (1870), as well as the principalities of the western Pamirs (1895).

During the late 19th century the Jadidists established themselves as an Islamic social movement throughout the region. Although the Jadidists were pro-modernization and not necessarily anti-Russian the Russians viewed the movement as a threat. Russian troops were required to restore order during uprisings against the Khanate of Kokand between 1910 and 1913. Further violence occurred in July 1916 when demonstrators attacked Russian soldiers in Khujand over the threat of forced conscription during World War I. Despite Russian troops quickly bringing Khujand back under control, clashes continued throughout the year in various locations in Tajikistan.

At the end of August 1920, the last emir, Sayyid Alim Khan, was overthrown by Soviet troops. On 6 October 1920, the emirate was abolished and the Bukharan People's Soviet Republic was proclaimed.

=== Basmachi movement (1916–1924) ===
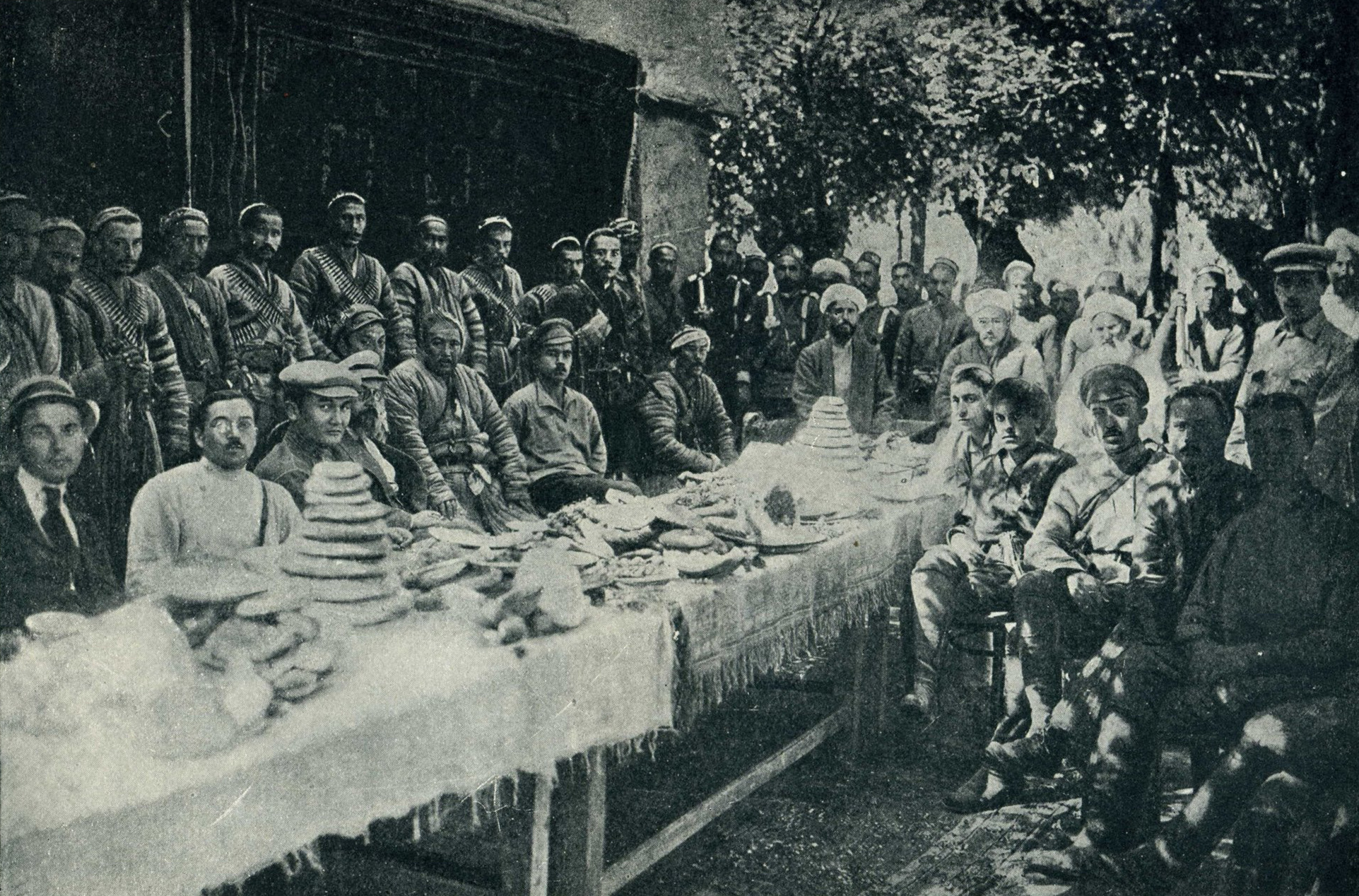
Soviet negotiations with basmachi, 1921

The Basmachi movement or Basmachi Revolt was an uprising against Russian Imperial and Soviet rule that arose after the Russian Revolution of 1917 guerrillas throughout Central Asia.

The movement's roots lay in the anti-conscription violence of 1916 that erupted when the Russian Empire began to draft Muslims for army service during World War I. In the months following the October 1917 Revolution the Bolsheviks seized power in many parts of the Russian Empire and the Russian Civil War began. Turkestani Muslim political movements attempted to form an autonomous government in the city of Kokand, in the Ferghana Valley. The Bolsheviks launched an assault on Kokand in February 1918 and carried out a general massacre of up to 25,000 people. The massacre rallied support to the Basmachi movements who waged a guerrilla war and a conventional war that seized control of large parts of the Ferghana Valley and much of Turkestan.

The fortunes of the decentralized movement fluctuated throughout the early 1920s but by 1923 the Red Army's extensive campaigns dealt the Basmachis many defeats. After major Red Army campaigns and concessions regarding economic and Islamic practices in the mid-1920s, the military fortunes and popular support of the Basmachi declined. Resistance to Soviet/Russian rule did flare up again to a lesser extent in response to collectivization campaigns in the pre-WWII Era.

=== Soviet Rule (1920–1991) ===
Flag of the Tajik SSR

In 1924, the Tajik Autonomous Soviet Socialist Republic was created as a part of Uzbekistan, but when national borders were drawn in 1928 (during the administrative delimitation) the ancient Tajik cities of Bukhara and Samarkand were placed outside the Tajikistan SSR. As citizens of the newly established Uzbek SSR, many Tajiks came under pressure to conform to their newly ascribed "Uzbek" identity, and under threat of exile, many were forced to change their identity and sign in passports as "Uzbeks". Tajik schools were closed and Tajiks were not appointed to leadership positions simply because of their ethnicity.

Between 1927 and 1934 collectivization of agriculture and a rapid expansion of cotton production took place, especially in the southern region. Soviet collectivization policy brought violence against peasants and forced resettlement occurred throughout Tajikistan. Consequently, some peasants fought collectivization and revived the Basmachi movement. Some small scale industrial development also occurred during this time along with the expansion of irrigation infrastructure.

Two rounds of Soviet purges directed by Moscow (1927–1934 and 1937–1938) resulted in the expulsion of nearly 10,000 people, from all levels of the Communist Party of Tajikistan. Ethnic Russians were sent in to replace those expelled and subsequently Russians dominated party positions at all levels, including the top position of first secretary. Between 1926 and 1959 the proportion of Russians among Tajikistan's population grew from less than 1% to 13%. Bobojon Ghafurov, Tajikistan's First Secretary of the Communist Party of Tajikistan from 1946 to 1956 was the only Tajikistani politician of significance outside the country during the Soviet Era. He was followed in office by Tursun Uljabayev (1956–61), Dzhabar Rasulov (1961–1982), and Rahmon Nabiyev (1982–1985, 1991–1992).

Tajiks began to be conscripted into the Soviet Army in 1939 and during World War II around 260,000 Tajik citizens fought against Germany, Finland and Japan. Between 60,000(4%) and 120,000(8%) of Tajikistan's 1,530,000 citizens were killed during World War II. Following the war and Stalin's reign attempts were made to further expand the agriculture and industry of Tajikistan. During 1957–58 Nikita Khrushchev's Virgin Lands Campaign focused attention on Tajikistan, where living conditions, education and industry lagged behind the other Soviet Republics.

In the 1980s, Tajikistan had the lowest household saving rate in the USSR, the lowest percentage of households in the two top per capita income groups, and the lowest rate of university graduates per 1000 people.

=== Perestroika and glasnost ===
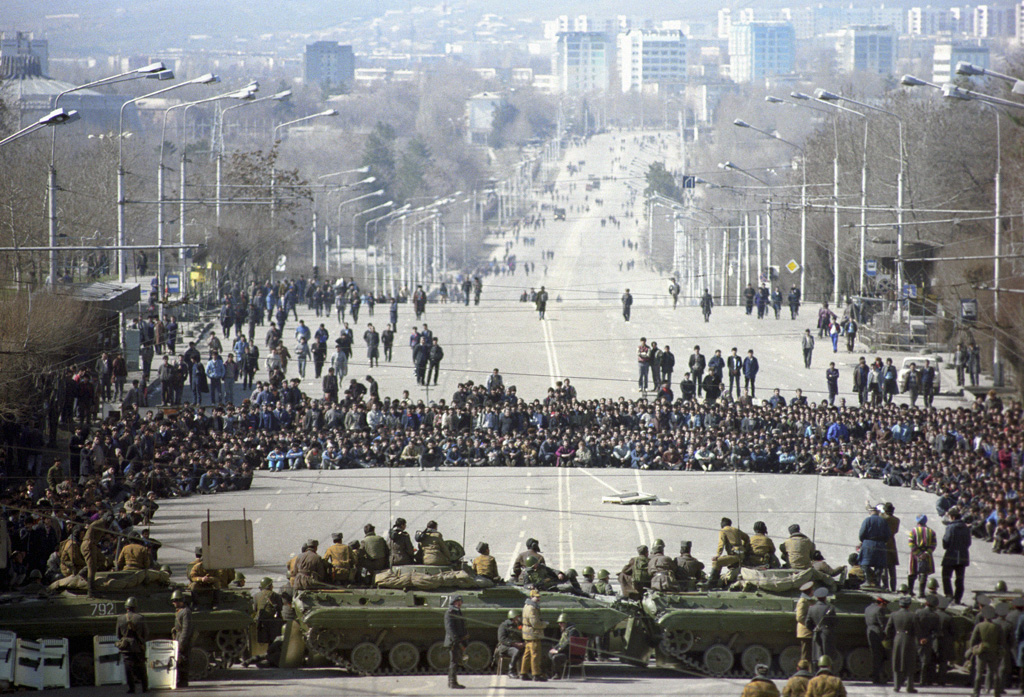
Protests in Dushanbe, February 1990

Living standards were undermined during the tenure of Kahar Mahkamov as first secretary of the Communist Party of Tajikistan from 1985. Mahkamov's attempted marketisation of the Tajik economy aggravated the poor living conditions and unemployment. On the eve of the Soviet collapse Tajikistan was suffering from a declining economy and dim prospects for recovery.

==== Priority over Soviet Union laws and negotiations on a new treaty ====
The glasnost policy of openness initiated by Mikhail Gorbachev offered disgruntled Tajiks a chance to voice their grievances.

==== Soviet coup attempt, the transition period and the end of the Soviet Union ====
In 1991, the Soviet Union collapsed, and Tajikistan declared its independence.

== Republic of Tajikistan (1991–present) ==
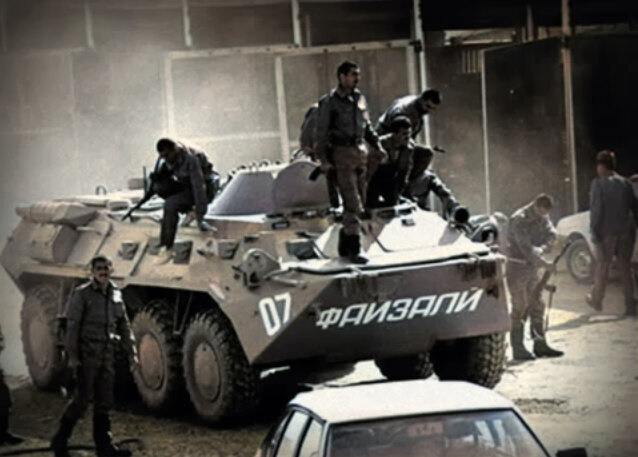
Uzbek Spetsnaz soldiers during the Civil War, 1992

=== Independent country and the Commonwealth ===
Post-Soviet countries have signed a series of treaties and agreements to settle the legacy of the former Soviet Union multilaterally and bilaterally.

The Tajikistan Soviet Socialist Republic (SSR) was among the last republics of the Soviet Union to declare its independence. On September 9 (1991), following the collapse of the Union of Soviet Socialist Republics (USSR), Tajikistan declared its independence. During this time, use of the Tajik language, an official language of the Tajikistan SSR next to Russian, was increasingly promoted. Ethnic Russians, who had held many governing posts, lost much of their influence and more Tajiks became politically active.

The nation almost immediately fell into a civil war that involved various factions fighting one another; these factions were often distinguished by clan loyalties. The non-Muslim population, particularly Russians and Jews, fled the country during this time because of persecution, increased poverty and better economic opportunities in the West or in other former Soviet republics.

Emomali Rahmon came to power in 1994, and continues to rule to this day. Ethnic cleansing was controversial during the civil war in Tajikistan. By the end of the war Tajikistan was in a state of complete devastation. The estimated dead numbered over 100,000. Around 1.2 million people were refugees inside and outside the country. In 1997, a ceasefire was reached between Rahmon and opposition parties (United Tajik Opposition).

Peaceful elections were held in 1999, but they were reported by the opposition as unfair, and Rahmon was re-elected by almost unanimous vote. Russian troops were stationed in southern Tajikistan, in order to guard the border with Afghanistan, until summer 2005. Since the September 11, 2001 attacks, American, Indian and French troops have also been stationed in the country.

In October 2020, President Emomali Rahmon was re-elected for next seven-year period with 90 per cent of the votes, following a tightly controlled and largely ceremonial election.

== See also ==
- Guzel Maitdinova
- Dissolution of the Soviet Union
- History of Central Asia
- Politics of Tajikistan
- Soviet Central Asia
