= List of leaders of Tajikistan =

List of leaders of Tajikistan since 1925

== Great Khans and Yuan dynasty ==
Before Kublai Khan announced the dynastic name "Great Yuan" in 1271, Great Khans (Khagan) of the Mongol Empire (Ikh Mongol Uls) already started to use the Chinese title of Emperor (Chinese: 皇帝; pinyin: Huángdì) practically in the Chinese language since Genghis Khan (as 成吉思皇帝; 'Genghis Emperor').

With the establishment of the Yuan dynasty in 1271, the Kublaids became Yuan emperors, who took on a dual identity of Khagan for the Mongols and Huangdi for ethnic Han.

Ruler	Reign	Information
Genghis Khan	1206 - 1227	The first Khan of the Mongol Empire.
Tolui Khan	1227 - 1229	Regent of the Mongol Empire until his brother, Ögedei became Khan.
Ögedei Khan	13 September 1229 – 11 December 1241	The second Khan of the Mongol Empire.
Töregene Khatun	1242 - 1246	Regent of the Mongol Empire until the election of her son, Güyük Khan.
Güyük Khan	24 August 1246 – 20 April 1248	The third Khan of the Mongol Empire.
Oghul Qaimish	1248 - 1251	Regent of the Mongol Empire until her death in 1251.
Möngke Khan	1 July 1251 – 11 August 1259	The fourth Khan of the Mongol Empire.
Ariq Böke	11 August 1259 – 12 August 1264	Claimed the title of Great Khan and fought against Kublai in the Toluid Civil War.
Kublai Khan	18 December 1271 – 18 February 1294	The first emperor of the Yuan Dynasty.
Temür Khan	10 May 1294 – 10 February 1307	The second emperor of the Yuan Dynasty.
Külüg Khan	21 June 1307 – 27 January 1311	The third emperor of the Yuan Dynasty.
Ayurbarwada Buyantu Khan	7 April 1311 – 1 March 1320	The fourth emperor of the Yuan Dynasty.
Gegeen Khan	19 April 1320 – 4 September 1323	The fifth emperor of the Yuan Dynasty.
Yesün Temür	4 October 1323 – 15 August 1328	The sixth emperor of the Yuan Dynasty.
Ragibagh Khan	October 1328 - 14 November 1328	The seventh emperor of the Yuan Dynasty.
Jayaatu Khan Tugh Temür	16 October 1328 – 26 February 1329. (first reign); 8 September 1329 – 2 September 1332 (second reign)	The eighth emperor of the Yuan Dynasty
Khutughtu Khan Kusala	27 February 1329 – 30 August 1329	The ninth emperor of the Yuan Dynasty. Seized the throne from Jayaatu Khan Tugh Temür.
Rinchinbal Khan	23 October 1332 – 14 December 1332	The tenth emperor of the Yuan Dynasty.
Toghon Temür	19 July 1333 – 10 September 1368	The eleventh emperor and last emperor of the Yuan Dynasty. Also the first emperor of the Northern Yuan Dynasty.

== Ilkhans ==
The title of Il Khan was used consistently only in the first half of the dynasty, and after the reign of Geikhatu it was rarely used, with the titles Padishah or Sultan being used instead.

=== House of Hulegu (1256–1335; Ilkhanate Mongol kings) ===
- Hulegu Khan (1256–1265)
- Abaqa Khan (1265–1282)
- Ahmad Tegüder (1282–1284)
- Arghun (1284–1291)
- Gaykhatu (1291–1295)
- Baydu (1295)
- Mahmud Ghazan (1295–1304)
- Muhammad Khodabandeh (Oljeitu or Öljaitü) (1304–1316)
- Abu Sa'id Bahadur (1316–1335)

After the death of Abu Said, the Warlords, governors and regional states raised their own candidates as claimants.

=== House of Ariq Böke ===
- Arpa Ke'ün (1335–1336)

=== House of Hulegu (1336–1357) ===
- Musa (1336–1337) (puppet of 'Ali Padshah of Baghdad)
- Muhammad (1336–1338) (Jalayirid puppet)
- Sati Beg (1338–1339) (Chobanid puppet)
- Sulayman (1339–1343) (Chobanid puppet, recognized by the Sarbadars 1341–1343)
- Jahan Temür (1339–1340) (Jalayirid puppet)
- Anushirwan (1343–1356) (Chobanid puppet)
- Ghazan II (1356–1357) (known only from coinage)

=== House of Hasar ===
Claimants from eastern Persia (Khurasan):

- Togha Temür (c. 1338–1353) (recognized by the Kartids 1338–1349; by the Jalayirids 1338–1339, 1340–1344; by the Sarbadars 1338–1341, 1344, 1353)
- Luqman (1353–1388) (son of Togha Temür and the protégé of Timur)

== Khans of the Chagatai Khanate ==
Personal Name	Reign	Religion
Chagatai Khan چغتائی خان	1226–1242 CE	Tengrism
Qara Hülëgü قارا ہلاکو	1242–1246 CE 1st Reign	Tengrism
Yesü Möngke یہسو مونکو	1246–1252 CE	Tengrism
Qara Hülëgü قارا ہلاکو	1252 CE 2nd Reign	Tengrism
Mubarak Shah مبارک شاہ; His mother Orqina Khatun was regent during this time	1252–1260 CE 1st Reign	Islam
Alghu bin Baidar الغو	1260–1266 CE	Tengrism
Mubarak Shah مبارک شاہ	1266 CE 2nd Reign	Islam
Ghiyas-ud-din Baraq غیاث الدین باراق	1266–1270 CE	Islam
Kaidu bin Kashin and his son Chapar bin Kaidu ruled as de facto Khans from 1270 until 1304. The Chagatai Khans during this period were appointed by them but still rebelled when they tried to exert their authority.
Negübei نہگوبائی; Under Kaidu bin Kashin	1270–1272 CE	Tengrism
Buqa Temür بغا تیمور بن قداقچی; Under Kaidu bin Kashin	127?–1282 CE	Tengrism
Duwa دووا; Under Kaidu bin Kashin & Chapar bin Kaidu	1282–1306 CE	Tengrism
Restoration of Chagatai Khanate independence.
Duwa دووا	1306–1307 CE	Tengrism
Könchek کونچہک	1307–1308 CE	Tengrism
Taliqu تالقو بن قداقچی	1308–1309 CE	Islam
Kebek قبق بن دووا	1309–1310 CE 1st Reign	Tengrism
Esen Buqa I ایشان بغا	1310–1318 CE	Tengrism
Kebek قبق بن دووا	1318–1325 CE 2nd Reign	Tengrism
Eljigidey ?	1325–1329 CE	Tengrism
Duwa Temür دووا تیمور	1329–1330 CE	Tengrism
Ala-ad-din Tarmashirin علاء الدین تارماشیریں	1331–1334 CE	Islam
Buzan بوزان	1334–1335 CE	Tengrism
Changshi چانگشی	1335–1338 CE	Tengrism
Yesun Temur یسون تیمور	1338–1342 CE	Tengrism
Ali Sultan علی سلطان	1342 CE	Islam
Muhammad I ibn Pulad محمد ابن پلاد	1342–1343 CE	Islam
Qazan Khan ibn Yasaur غازان خان	1343–1346 CE	Islam
Qazan's death signified the end of the effective power of the Chagatai khans within the ulus; subsequent khans were rulers in name only. Qazaghan took the title of Amir and to legitimize himself conferred the title of khan on descendants of Genghis Khan of his own choosing.
Danishmandchi دانشمندجی; Under Qazaghan	1346–1348 CE	Islam
During Qazaghan's reign the Chagatai Khanate devolved into a loose confederation of tribes. This resulted in the Division of the Empire in 1347 CE into the Western Chagatai Khanate and Eastern part known as Moghulistan under Tughlugh Timur.

- Blue rows signifies nominal rule.

=== Emirs of Timurid Empire ===
No.	Coin	Name	Reign	Life details
1		Timur Beg Gurkani تیمور بیگ گورکانی	9 April 1370 – 18 February 1405 (~35 years)	1320s – 18 February 1405 (aged 85): De facto ruler of Chagatai Khanate under Soyurghatmïsh Khan and Sultan Mahmud Khan.; Adopted the junior Arabic title of Emir.
2		Pir Muhammad پیر محمد	18 February 1405 – 22 February 1407 (~2 years)	1376 – 22 February 1407 (aged 31): Grandson of Timur through Jahangir Mirza, and his nominated heir.
3		Khalil Sultan خلیل سلطان	18 February 1405 – 1409 (~4 years)	13 August 1384 – 3 November 1411 (aged 27): Grandson of Timur through Miran Shah.; Seized and ruled from Samarkand against Pir Muhammad.
4		Shahrukh Mirza شاھرخ میرزا	20 February 1405 – 13 March 1447 (~35 years)	20 August 1377 – 13 March 1447 (aged 69): Son of Timur
5		Ulugh Beg Mirza الغ بیگ میرزا	13 March 1447 – 27 October 1449 (~2 years)	22 March 1394 – 27 October 1449 (aged 55): Son of Shahrukh Mirza

== List of monarchs ==
=== Empire (1747–1823; 1839–1842) ===
Name	Lifespan	Reign start	Reign end	Notes	Family	Image
Ahmad Shah Durrani: احمد شاه دراني	1720 – 16 October 1772	July 1747	16 October 1772		Durrani	
Sulaiman Shah Durrani: سليمان شاه دراني	Unknown	16 October 1772	November 1772		Durrani	
Timur Shah Durrani: تېمور شاه دراني	December 1746 – 20 May 1793	November 1772	20 May 1793		Durrani	
Zaman Shah Durrani: زمان شاه دراني	1767 – 13 September 1845	20 May 1793	25 July 1801		Durrani	
Mahmud Shah Durrani (1st reign): محمود شاه دراني	1769 – 18 April 1829	25 July 1801	13 July 1803		Durrani	
Shuja Shah Durrani (1st reign): شجاع شاه دراني	4 November 1785 – 5 April 1842	13 July 1803	3 May 1809		Durrani	
Mahmud Shah Durrani (2nd reign): محمود شاه دراني	1769 – 18 April 1829	3 May 1809	February 1811		Durrani	
Abbas Shah Durrani: عباس شاه دراني	Died February 1811	February 1811	February 1811		Durrani	
Mahmud Shah Durrani (3rd reign): محمود شاه دراني	1769 – 18 April 1829	February 1811	September 1818		Durrani	
Ali Shah Durrani: علي شاه دراني	Died December 1818	September 1818	December 1818		Durrani	
Ayub Shah Durrani: ايوب شاه دراني	Died 1 October 1837	December 1818	1823		Durrani	
Shuja Shah Durrani (2nd reign): شجاع شاه دراني	4 November 1785 – 5 April 1842	7 August 1839	5 April 1842		Durrani	
Fateh Jang Durrani: فتح جنگ دراني	Died 25 June 1855	5 April 1842	12 October 1842		Durrani	
Shahpur Shah Durrani: شاهپور شاه دراني	Died 1884	12 October 1842	December 1842		Durrani	

=== Kandahar (1793–1795) ===
Name	Lifespan	Reign start	Reign end	Notes	Family	Image
Humayun Shah Durrani: همایون شاه درانی	Died December 1795	May 1793	December 1795	Rose in revolt against his uterine brother King Zaman Shah Durrani by attempting to conquer Kandahar in three separate occasions	Sadozai	

=== Herat (1793–1863) ===
Name	Lifespan	Reign start	Reign end	Notes	Family	Image
Mahmud Shah Durrani	1769 – 18 April 1829	20 May 1793	14 October 1797		Sadozai	
Firuz al-Din Mirza Durrani	Unknown	25 July 1801	September 1818		Sadozai	
Fath Ali Khan	1758 – August 1818	September 1818	1826		Barakzai	
Mahmud Shah Durrani	1769 – 18 April 1829	1826	March 1842		Sadozai	
Kamran Mirza Durrani	Died 1842	March 1842	23 June 1851		Sadozai	
Yar Mohammad Khan	1790–1851	23 June 1851	15 September 1855		Alakozai	
Said Mohammad Khan	Unknown	15 September 1855	28 April 1856		Alakozai	
Mohammad Yusuf Mirza Durrani	Died March 1857	28 April 1856	25 October 1856		Sadozai	
Isa Khan Bardurrani	Unknown	25 October 1856	September 1857		Bardurrani	
Sultan Ahmad Khan	Died January 1863	27 July 1857	6 March 1863		Barakzai	
Shah Nawaz Khan	Unknown	6 March 1863	27 June 1863		Barakzai	

== List of rulers ==
=== Shaybanids ===
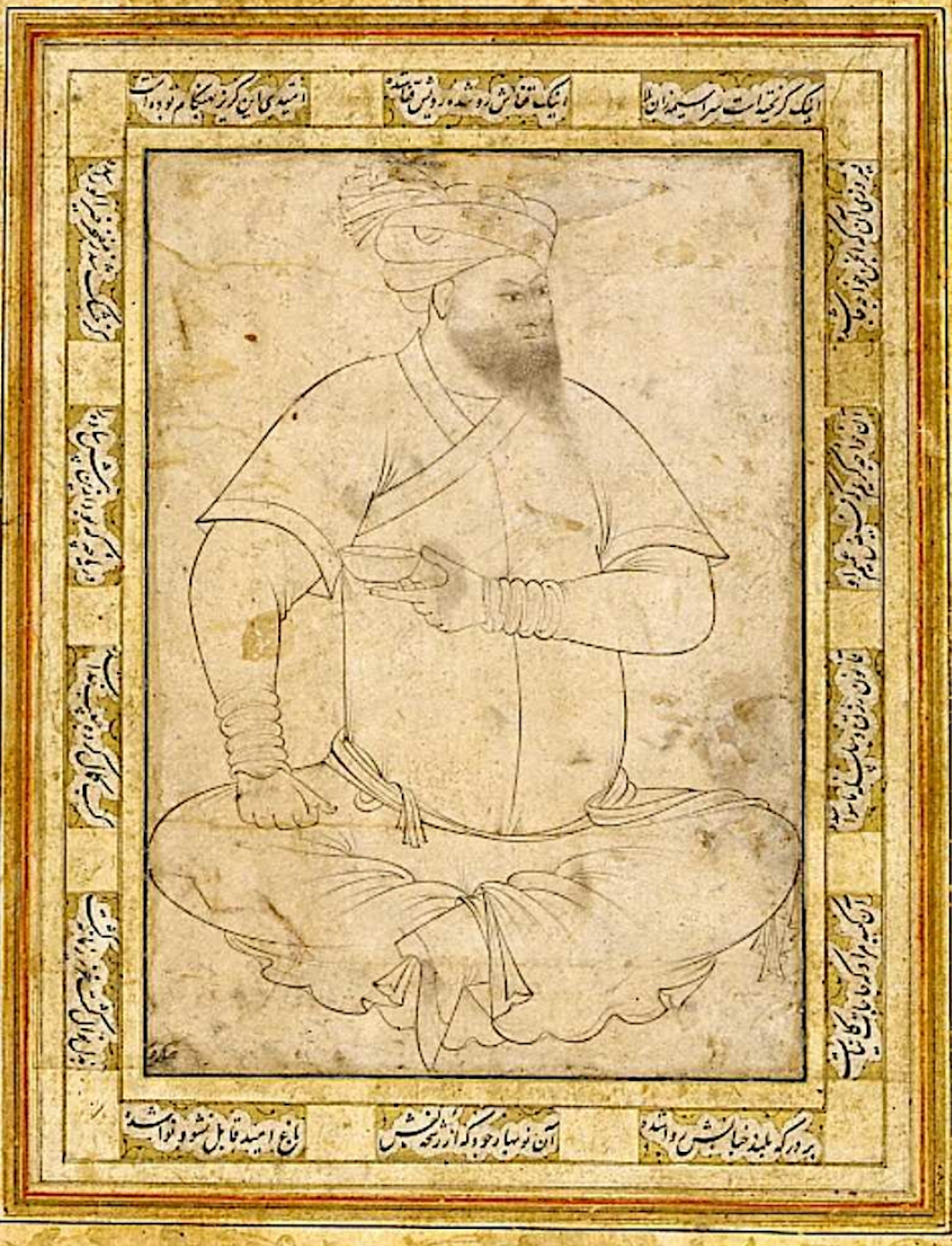
Nawruz Ahmad (Baraq Khan) (1552–1556).

- Shah Bakht Muhammad Shaybani ibn Shah Budaq ibn Abu'l-Khayr Khan (1501–1510)
- Suyunchuk Khwaja ibn Abu'l-Khayr Khan (1511–1512) ruler in Tashkent during Safavid occupation
- Kuchkunchi Muhammad ibn Abu'l-Khayr Khan (1512–1530)
- Abu Sa'id Khan ibn Kuchkunchi Muhammad (1530–1533)
- Ubaydallah ibn Mahmud Shah ibn Shah Budaq ibn Abu'l-Khayr Khan (1533–1540)
- Abdullah I ibn Kuchkunchi Muhammad (1540)
- Abdul-Latif ibn Kuchkunchi Muhammad (1540–1552)
- Nawruz Ahmad (Baraq) ibn Suyunchuk Khwaja (1552–1556)
- Pir Muhammad I ibn Jani Beg ibn Khwaja Muhammad ibn Abu'l-Khayr Khan (1556–1561)
- Iskandar ibn Jani Beg (1561–1583)
- Abdullah II ibn Iskandar (1583–1598); de facto ruled since 1561
- Abdul-Mu'min ibn Abdullah (1598)
- Pir Muhammad II ibn Sulayman ibn Jani Beg (1598–1599)

=== Janids ===
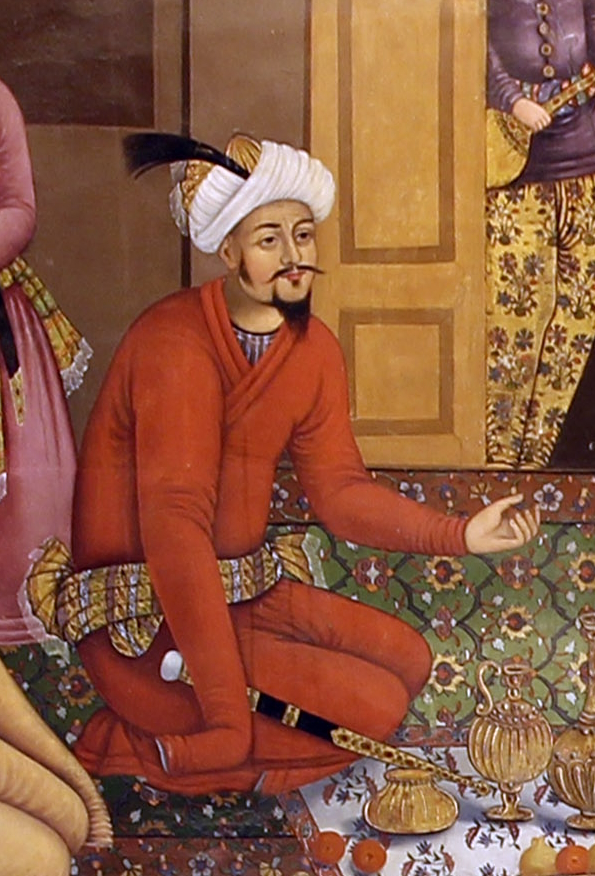
Vali Muhammad Khan as depicted in the Chehel Sotoun in Isfahan, Iran. Circa 1650 painting

- Yar Muhammad Khan (1599–1600) abdicated, died c. 1612; son-in-law of Iskandar ibn Jani Beg ("Iskandar Khan"); descended from Küchük Muhammad Khan of the Golden Horde
- Jani Muhammad Khan (1600–1603)
- Baqi Muhammad Khan (1600–1606) de facto ruled since 1599; abdicated
- Vali Muhammad Khan (1606–1611) deposed
- Imam Quli Khan (1611) deposed
- Vali Muhammad Khan (1611) restored
- Imam Quli Khan (1611–1641) restored, abdicated, died 1642
- Nadr Muhammad Khan (1642–1645) deposed, died 1651
- Abd al-Aziz Khan (1645–1681) abdicated, died 1684
- Subhan Quli Khan (1681–1702)
- Muhammad Ubaidullah Khan (1702 – 18 March 1711)
- Abu al-Fayz Khan (1711–1747)
- Muhammad Abd al-Mumin (1747–1750)
- Muhammad Ubaidullah II (1750–1753) adopted into family, nominal monarch

=== Manghits ===
- Muhammad Rahim (usurper), atalik (1753–1756), khan (1756–1758)
- Shir Ghazi (1758–?)
- Abu'l-Ghazi Khan (1758–1785)

== List of emirs ==
Titular Name	Personal Name	Reign
Ataliq I اتالیق	Khudayar Bey خدایار بیگ	?
Ataliq II اتالیق	Muhammad Hakim محمد حکیم	?–1747
Ataliq III اتالیق	Muhammad Rahim محمد رحیم	1747–1753
Amir I امیر	Muhammad Rahim محمد رحیم	1753–1756
Khan خان	Muhammad Rahim محمد رحیم	1756–1758
Ataliq IV اتالیق	Daniyal biy دانیال بیگ	1758–1785
Amir Masum امیر معصوم	Shahmurad شاہ مراد بن دانیال بیگ	1785–1800
Amir II امیر	Haydar bin Shahmurad حیدر تورہ بن شاہ مراد	1800–1826
Amir III امیر	Mir Hussein bin Haydar حسین بن حیدر تورہ	1826–1827
Amir IV امیر	Umar bin Haydar عمر بن حیدر تورہ	1827
Amir V امیر	Nasr-Allah bin Haydar Tora نصراللہ بن حیدر تورہ	1827–1860
Amir VI امیر	Muzaffar bin Nasrullah مظفر الدین بن نصراللہ	1860–1885
Amir VII امیر	Abdul-Ahad bin Muzaffar al-Din عبدل احد بن مظفر الدین	1885–1910
Amir VIII امیر	Muhammad Alim Khan bin Abdul-Ahad محمد عالم خان بن عبدل احد	1910–1920
Overthrow of Emirate of Bukhara by Bukharan People's Soviet Republic, which, in turn, was forcibly replaced by Bolsheviks.

- Pink Rows denote progenitor chiefs serving as Tutors (Ataliqs) & Viziers to the Khans of Bukhara.
- Green Rows denote chiefs who took over reign of government from the Janids and placed puppet Khans.
- A photo of Mohammed Alim Khan, final emir 1911–1920, is shown at Emir.

== Bukharan People's Soviet Republic[ Political leaders ==
Denotes Acting leader

Name	Took office	Left office	Party	Notes
Chairmen of the Central Revolutionary Committee
Mirzo Abduqodir Mansurovich Mukhitdinov	2 September 1920	22 September 1921	Communist Party of Bukhara	Styled Chairman of the Provisional Revolutionary Committee from 2 September to 6 October 1920
Polat Usmon Khodzhayev	25 September 1921	8 December 1921	Communist Party of Bukhara	
Chairmen of the Presidium of the Central Executive Committee
Polat Usmon Khodzhayev	23 September 1921	12 April 1922	Communist Party of Bukhara	
Muin Jon Aminov	12 April 1922	18 August 1922	Communist Party of Bukhara	
Porsa Khodzhayev	18 August 1922	27 October 1924	Communist Party of Bukhara	
Chairmen of the Council of People's Nazirs (Ministers)
Fayzulla Xoʻjayev	8 October 1920	19 April 1923	Communist Party of Bukhara	
Mirzo Abduqodir Mansurovich Mukhitdinov	15 June 1923	27 October 1924	Communist Party of Bukhara	

== List of khans ==
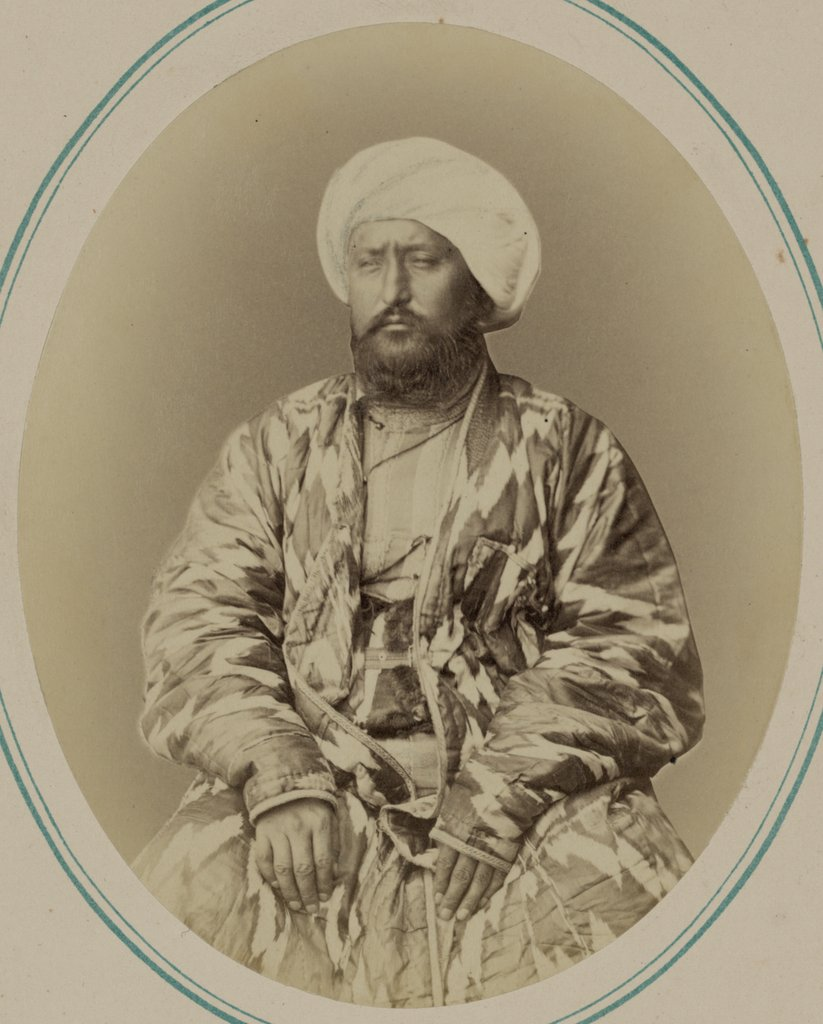
Seyid Muhammad Khudayar Khan, the 1860s

Reign	Ruler
1709–1722	Shahrukh Biy
1722–1734	Abd al-Rahim Biy
1734–1751	Abd al-Karim Biy
1751–1752	Irdana Biy (1st Reign)
1752–1753	Baba Biy
1753–1769	Irdana Biy (2nd Reign)
1769–1770	Sulayman Biy
1770–1799	Narbuta Biy
1799–1811	Alim Khan
1811–1822	Muhammad Umar Khan
1822–1842	Muhammad Ali Khan
1842–1844	Shir Ali Khan
1844	Murad Beg Khan
1844–1852	Muhammad Khudayar Khan (1st Reign)
	Mingbashi Musulmonqul (Regent for Khudayar Khan)
1852–1858	Muhammad Khudayar Khan (2nd Reign)
1858–1862	Muhammad Mallya Beg Khan
1862	Shah Murad Khan
1862–1863	Muhammad Khudayar Khan (3rd Reign)
1863–1865	Sultan Sayyid Khan (puppet of Alimqul)
1865	Bil Bahchi Khan
1865–1875	Muhammad Khudayar Khan (4th Reign)
1875	Nasruddin Khan (1st Reign)
1875	Muhammad Pulad Beg Khan
1876	Nasruddin Khan (2nd Reign)

=== Governors-General of Turkestan ===
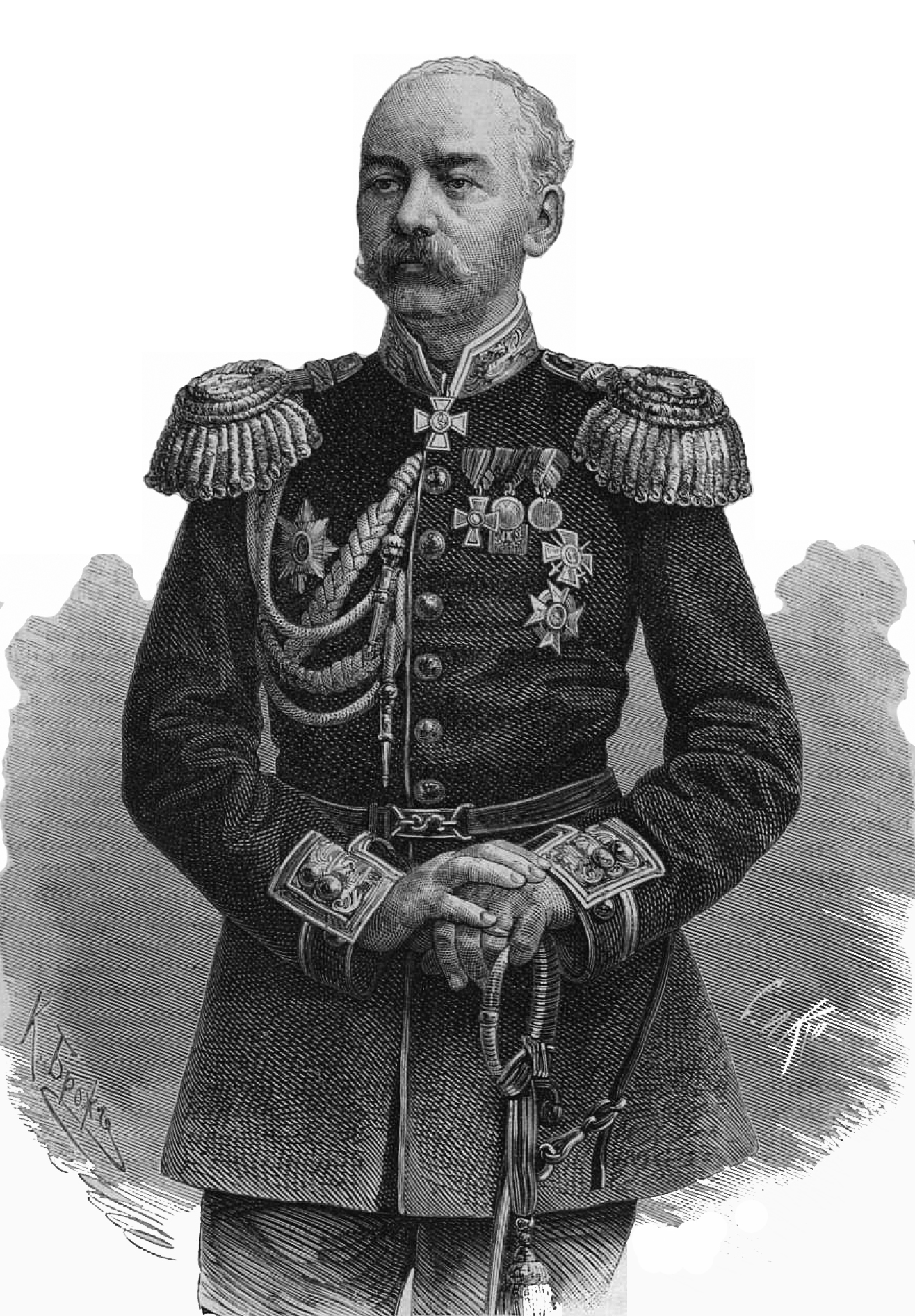
Konstantin von Kaufman, first and longest-serving Governor-General of Turkestan (1867–1882)

The governorate-general was administered by a series of military generals appointed by the Tsar.

Name	Tenure	Military Rank
Konstantin von Kaufman	1867–1882	Engineer-General
Mikhail Chernyayev	1882–1884	Lieutenant General
Nikolai Rozenbakh	1884–1889	General of Infantry
Alexander Vrevsky	1889–1898	Lieutenant General / General of Infantry
Sergei Dukhovskoi	1898–1901	General of Infantry
Nikolai Ivanov	1901–1904	Lieutenant General
Nikolai Tevyashev	1904–1905	General of Cavalry
Dejan Subotić	1905–1906	Lieutenant General
Nikolai Grodekov	1906–1908	General of Infantry
Pavel Mishchenko	1908–1909	General of Artillery
Alexander Samsonov	1909–1914	General of Cavalry
Fedor Martson	1914–1916	General of Infantry
Aleksey Kuropatkin	1916–1917	General of Infantry

== Chairmen of the Central Executive Committee ==
1. Kobozev, Pyotr Alekseevich (April – May 1918), Solkin, Andrey Fedorovich, contributor (April – 2 June 1918)
2. Tobolin, Ivan Osipovich (2 June – 5 October 1918)
3. Votintsev, Vsevolod Dmitrievich (October 1918 – 19 January 1919)
4. – (19 January – 31 March 1919)
5. Kazakov, Aristarkh Andreevich (31 March – July 1919)
6. Kobozev, Pyotr Alekseevich (July – September 1919)
7. Apin, Ivan Andreevich (September 1919 – January 1920)
8. Ryskulov, Turar Ryskulovich (January – 21 July 1920)
9. Biserov, Mukhammedzhan (21 July – August 1920)
10. Rakhimbaev, Abdullo Rakhimbaevich (4 August 1920 – May 1921), Khodzhanov Sultanbek, acting, prev. (12 May 1920 – ?)
11. Tyuryakulov, Nazir Tyuryakulovich (May 1921 – June 1922)
12. Rakhimbaev, Abdullo Rakhimbaevich (June – October 1922)
13. Khidir-Aliev, Inagadzhan (October 1922 – 1 January 1924), Dadabaev Butabay, vrid. prev. (August – September 1923)
14. Aytakov, Nedirbai (9 January – November 1924)

Chairmen of the Council of People's Commissars ("Turksovnarkom").

Initial date	Final date	Name
15 November 1917	November 1918	Fyodor Kolesov
November 1918	19 January 1919	Vladislav Figelskiy (ru)
19 January 1919	31 March 1919	Post vacant
31 March 1919	12 September 1919	Karp Sorokin (ru)
12 September 1919	March 1920	Turksovnarkom defunct
March 1920	May 1920	Jānis Rudzutaks
May 1920	September 1920	Isidor Lubimov
19 September 1920	October 1922	Kaikhaziz Atabayev
October 1922	12 January 1924	Turar Ryskulov
12 January 1924	27 October 1924	Sharustam Islamov (ru)

=== Beks of Mastchoh (Matcha)(in rebellion) ===
- Nov 1918 - af.1919 Sultan Bek Davlatov
- c.Mar 1920 Mir Muhammadov (d. 1920)
- Sep 1920 - Apr 1923 Said Ahmad Khwaja (d. 1923)

=== Emir of Darvaz and Karategin (at Gharm, in rebellion) ===
- Nov 1922 - Aug 1923 Fuzayl Maqsum

This is a list of leaders of present-day Tajikistan since the establishment of the Tajik Autonomous Soviet Socialist Republic (Tajik ASSR) in 1925.

== Leaders of Tajikistan (1925–1991) ==
=== Tajik Autonomous Soviet Socialist Republic (1925–1929) ===
==== Executive Secretaries of the Communist Party of the Tajik Provincial Committee ====
No.	Name	Term
1	Chinor Imomov	1924–1925
2	Boris Tolpygo	1925–1927
3	Mumin Khodzhayev	1927–1928
4	Ali Heydar Ibash Shervoni	1928–1929
5	Shirinsho Shotemur	1929 – November 1929

=== Tajik Soviet Socialist Republic (1929–1991) ===
==== First Secretaries of the Tajik Communist Party ====
No.	Name	Term
1	Mirza Davud Huseynov	November 1929 – 3 November 1933
2	Grigory Broydo	3 November 1933 – 8 January 1934
3	Suren Shadunts	8 January 1934 – September 1937
4	Urunboi Ashurov	September 1937 – March 1938
5	Dmitri Protopopov	April 1938 – August 1946
6	Bobojon Ghafurov	16 August 1946 – 24 May 1956
7	Tursun Uljabayev	24 May 1956 – 12 April 1961
8	Jabar Rasulov	12 April 1961 – 4 April 1982
9	Rahmon Nabiyev	4 April 1982 – 14 December 1985
10	Qahhor Mahkamov	14 December 1985 – 4 September 1991

==== Chairmen of the Central Executive Committee ====
No.	Name	Term	Notes
1	Nusratullo Mahsum	16 December 1926 – 28 December 1933	Served as Chairman of the Tajik ASSR CIK from 1926 to 1929, and continued as Chairman of the Tajik SSR CIK from 1929 to 1933.
2	Shirinsho Shotemur	28 December 1933 – December 1936	
3	Abdullo Rakhimbayev	December 1936 – September 1937	
4	Munavar Shagadayev	September 1937 – 13 July 1938	

==== Chairman of the Supreme Soviet ====
No.	Name	Term
1	N. Ashurov	13 July 1938 – 15 July 1938

==== Chairmen of the Presidium of the Supreme Soviet ====
No.	Name	Term
1	Munavar Shagadayev	15 July 1938 – 29 July 1950
2	Nazarsho Dodkhudoyev	29 July 1950 – 24 May 1956
3	Mirzo Rakhmatov	24 May 1956 – 28 March 1963
4	Makhmadullo Kholov	28 March 1963 – January 1964
5	Nizoramo Zaripova	14 January 1964 – 17 February 1964
6	Vladimir Oplanchuk (acting)	January – 17 February 1964
7	Gaibnasar Pallayev	17 February 1964 – 12 April 1990

==== Chairman of the Supreme Soviet ====
No.	Name	Term
1	Qahhor Mahkamov	12 April 1990 – 30 November 1990

== Leaders ==
=== First Secretary of the Communist Party of Tajikistan (1924–1991) ===
No.	Picture	Name (Birth–Death)	Took office	Left office	Political party
First Secretary
1		Chinor Emomov (1898–1939)	1924	1927	CPSU
2		Mumin Khojaev (?–?)	1927	1928	CPSU
3		Ali Shervoni (?–?)	1928	1929	CPSU
4		Shirinsho Shotemur (1899–1937)	1929	1930	CPSU
5		Mirza Huseynov (1894–1938)	1930	1933	CPSU
6		Grigory Broydo (1883–1956)	1933	1934	CPSU
7		Suren Shadunts (1898–1938)	1934	1936	CPSU
8		Urunboi Ashurov (1903–1938)	1936	1937	CPSU
9		Dmitri Protopopov (1897–1986)	1937	1946	CPSU
10		Bobojon Ghafurov (1908–1977)	1946	1956	CPSU
11		Tursun Uljabayev (1916–1988)	1956	1961	CPSU
12		Dzhabar Rasulov (1913–1982)	1961	1982	CPSU
13		Rahmon Nabiyev (1930–1993)	1982	1985	CPSU
14		Qahhor Mahkamov (1932–2016)	1985	1991	CPSU

=== Second Secretaries ===
- Shirinsho Shotemur (1930–1932)
- Ibrahim Ismailov (1932–1934)
- Saifullo Abdulloev (1936–1937)
- Petru Lucinschi (1986–1989)

=== Chairman of the Communist Party of Tajikistan (1991–present) ===
No.	Picture	Name (Birth–Death)	Took office	Left office
Chairman
1		Shodi Shabdolov (1943–2023)	4 September 1991	2 July 2016
2		Ismoil Talbakov (1955–2016)	2 July 2016	17 December 2016
3		Mirzoazim Nasimov (?–?)	17 December 2016	22 April 2017
4		Miroj Abdulloyev (1948–2026)	22 April 2017	7 April 2026

== Presidents of the Republic of Tajikistan (1991–present) ==
No.	Portrait	Name (Born–Died)	Term			Political Party	Elected
No.	Portrait	Name (Born–Died)	Took office	Left office	Time in office	Political Party	Elected
President
1	Qahhor Mahkamov	Qahhor Mahkamov (1932–2016)	30 November 1990	31 August 1991	274 days	Communist	—
–	Qadriddin Aslonov	Qadriddin Aslonov (1947–1992); Acting	31 August 1991	23 September 1991	23 days	Communist	—
2	Rahmon Nabiyev	Rahmon Nabiyev (1930–1993)	23 September 1991	6 October 1991	13 days	Communist	—
–	Akbarsho Iskandarov	Akbarsho Iskandarov (born 1951); Acting	6 October 1991	2 December 1991	57 days	Communist	—
(2)	Rahmon Nabiyev	Rahmon Nabiyev (1930–1993)	2 December 1991	7 September 1992	280 days	Communist	1991
–	Akbarsho Iskandarov	Akbarsho Iskandarov (born 1951); Acting	7 September 1992	20 November 1992	13 days	Communist	—
Chairman of the Supreme Assembly
–	Emomali Rahmonov	Emomali Rahmonov (born 1952)	20 November 1992	16 November 1994	1 year, 361 days	Independent	—
President
3	Emomali Rahmon	Emomali Rahmon (born 1952)	16 November 1994	Incumbent	31 years, 361 days	PDP	1994; 1999; 2006; 2013; 2020

== Vice President of Tajikistan ==
Vice President	President	Entered office	Left office	Notes
Izatullo Khayoyev	Qahhor Mahkamov	December 1990	June 1991	
Narzullo Dustov	Rahmon Nabiyev	2 December 1991	May 1992	

== Prime Minister ==
- 1917–1918 Mukhamedzhan Tynyshpaev
- 1918 Mustafa Shokay
- 1918 Kichik Ergash

== Tajik Autonomous Soviet Socialist Republic (1925–1929) ==
=== Chairmen of the Council of People's Commissars ===
No.	Name	Term	Notes
1	Nusratulla Mahsum	1925–1926	Also known as Nusratullo Lutfullayev (1881–1937). Served as Chairman of the Revolutionary Committee (1924–1926). Executed during the Great Purge. Posthumously awarded Hero of Tajikistan in 2006.
2	Polat Usmon Khodzhayev	December 1926 – 1928	
3	Mumin Khodzhayev	March 1928 – December 1929	

== Tajik Soviet Socialist Republic (1929–1991) ==
=== Chairmen of the Council of People's Commissars ===
No.	Name	Term	Notes
1	Abdurrahim Hojibayev	December 1929 – 28 December 1933	(25 April 1900 – 25 January 1938). Born in Khujand. Died during the Great Purge.
2	Abdullo Rakhimbayev	28 December 1933 – February 1937	(1 June 1896 – 7 May 1938). Ethnic Uzbek, born in Tajikistan. Executed during Stalin's repressions.
3	Urunboi Ashurov	February – September 1937	(1903–1938). Also served as First Secretary of the Communist Party of Tajikistan (1937–1938).
4	Mamdali Kurbanov	September 1937 – April 1946	Rose from being a miner to become prime minister.

=== Chairmen of the Council of Ministers ===
No.	Name	Term	Notes
1	Dzhabar Rasulov	April 1946 – 29 March 1955	(10 July 1913 – 4 April 1982). Later served as First Secretary of the Communist Party of Tajikistan (1961–1982).
2	Tursun Uljabayev	29 March 1955 – 25 May 1956	(1 May 1916 – 31 May 1988). Later served as First Secretary of the Communist Party (1956–1961). Expelled from the party in 1961 over cotton production scandal.
3	Nazarsho Dodkhudoyev	25 May 1956 – 12 April 1961	(1915–2000). Lost his position in the purge that followed the cotton scandal.
4	Abdulakhad Kakharov	12 April 1961 – 24 July 1973	(born 17 April 1913). Soviet statesman and party figure. Awarded two Orders of Lenin.
5	Rahmon Nabiyev	24 July 1973 – 20 April 1982	(5 October 1930 – 11 April 1993). Later served as First Secretary (1982–1985) and President of Tajikistan (1991–1992).
6	Qahhor Mahkamov	26 April 1982 – 26 January 1986	(16 April 1932 – 8 June 2016). Later served as First Secretary (1985–1991) and first President of Tajikistan (1990–1991).

==== Chairmen of the Council of Ministers ====
- Qahhor Mahkamov (26 January 1986 – 26 January 1986)
- Izatullo Khayoyev (26 January 1986 – 6 December 1990)

== Republic of Tajikistan (1991–present) ==
No.	Portrait	Prime Minister	Took office	Left office	Time in office	Party
1	Izatullo Khayoyev	Izatullo Khayoyev (1936–2015)	25 June 1991	9 January 1992	198 days	Communist
2	Akbar Mirzoyev	Akbar Mirzoyev (born 1939)	9 January 1992	21 September 1992	256 days	Independent
3	Abdumalik Abdullajanov	Abdumalik Abdullajanov (born 1949)	21 September 1992	18 December 1993	1 year, 88 days	People's Unity
4	Abdujalil Samadov	Abdujalil Samadov (1949–2004)	18 December 1993	2 December 1994	349 days	Independent
5	Jamshed Karimov	Jamshed Karimov (born 1940)	2 December 1994	8 February 1996	1 year, 68 days	Independent
6	Yahyo Azimov	Yahyo Azimov (born 1947)	8 February 1996	20 December 1999	3 years, 315 days	Independent
7	Oqil Oqilov	Oqil Oqilov (born 1944)	20 December 1999	23 November 2013	13 years, 338 days	PDP
8	Qohir Rasulzoda	Qohir Rasulzoda (born 1961)	23 November 2013	Incumbent	12 years, 354 days	PDP

== Complete list of deputy prime ministers ==
The following is a list of all individuals who have held the office of Deputy Prime Minister of Tajikistan since 1991:

Photo	Name	Term Start	Term End
	Georgy Koshlakov	1991	1991
	Jamshed Karimov	January 1991	July 1991
	Asadullo Gulomov	2003	December 1, 2006
	Khayrinisso Yusufi	2004	2008
	Murodali Alimardon	26 January 2008	1 April 2015
	Ruqiya Qurbonova	26 January 2008	November 23, 2013
	Azim Ibrohim	November 23, 2013	August 30, 2020
	Mahmadtohir Zokirzoda	March 30, 2016	January 21, 2020
	Matlubakhon Sattoriyon	November 3, 2020	January 29, 2024
	Sulaimon Ziyozoda	26 January 2022	Present
	Dilrabo Mansuri Saidullo	29 January 2024	Present
	Usmonali Usmonzoda	November 3, 2020	Present

== List ==
- Jamshed Karimov (July 1991 - November 1992)
- Mahmadsaid Ubaydulloyev (1994 - 28 March 1996)
- Yuri Ponosov (28 March 1996 – 18 February 1998)
- Haji Akbar Turajanzade (18 February 1998 - 13 March 2005)
- Asadullo Gulomov (December 1, 2006 - August 3, 2011)
- Matlubkhon Davlatov (2012 - November 19, 2013)
- Davlatali Said (November 19, 2013 - January 5, 2023)
- Hokim Kholiqzoda (since January 16, 2024)

== See also ==
- Politics of Tajikistan
- President of Tajikistan
- Vice President of Tajikistan
- Prime Minister of Tajikistan
