= List of chairmen of the Supreme Soviet of the Tajik Soviet Socialist Republic =

The chairman of the Supreme Soviet of the Tajik Soviet Socialist Republic was the presiding officer of that body.

== Chairmen of the Supreme Soviet of the Tajik Soviet Socialist Republic ==
Name	Period
Nignat Ashurov	July 13, 1938 – ?
Tahir Pulatov	June 1945 – 1952
A. Khasanov	? – August 17, 1961
Mirsaid Mirshakar	August 17, 1961 – March 7, 1975
K. Sh. Dzhurayev	March 7, 1975 – March 25, 1980
Usman Khasanov	March 25, 1980 – March 29, 1985
Talbak Nazarov	March 29, 1985 – November 18, 1988
M. S. Tabarov	November 18, 1988 – April 12, 1990
Qahhor Mahkamov	April 12, 1990 – November 30, 1990
Kadriddin Aslonov	November 30, 1990 – September 9, 1991

== Chairmen of the Supreme Soviet of the Republic of Tajikistan ==
Name	Period
Kadriddin Aslonov	September 9, 1991 – September 23, 1991
Rakhmon Nabiyev	September 23, 1991 – October 6, 1991
Akbarsho Iskandrov	October 6, 1991 – December 2, 1991
Safarali Kenjayev	December 2, 1991 – April 22, 1992
Akbarsho Iskandrov	April 22, 1992 – April 29, 1992
Safarali Kenjayev	April 29, 1992 – May 1992
Akbarsho Iskandrov	May, 1992 – November 19, 1992
Imomali Rakhmonov	November 27, 1992 – November 16, 1994

== Chairman of the Supreme Assembly of Tajikistan ==
Name	Period
Safarali Rajabov	April 6, 1995 – 2000

== Sources ==
- A Comprehensive Chronology of Central Asia, Afghanistan and Iran by Iraj Bashiri

== See also ==
- President of Tajikistan
- Supreme Assembly of Tajikistan
