= First Lady of Tajikistan =

- Бонуи аввали Тоҷикистон
- Presidential Standard

- Incumbent; Azizmo Asadullayeva since 7 September 1992
- Residence: Palace of the Nation, Dushanbe
- Term length: 7 years
- Inaugural holder: Gavkhar Makhkamova
- Formation: 2 December 1991

First Lady of Tajikistan (Tajik: Бонуи аввали Тоҷикистон, romanized: Bānuyi Avval-i Tājīkistān) is the title attributed to the wife of the President of Tajikistan. The current first lady of Tajikistan is Azizmo Asadullayeva, wife of President Emomali Rahmon.

== First ladies of Tajikistan ==
No.	Image	Name (Birth-Death)	Term begins	Term ends	President of Tajikistan (Birth-Death)	President image
1		Gavkhar Makhkamova (1934–2013)	30 November 1990	31 August 1991	Qahhor Mahkamov (1932–2016)	
2		Mariam Nabieva (1937–2017)	2 December 1991	7 September 1992	Rahmon Nabiyev (1930–1993)	
3		Azizmo Asadullayeva (b. 1954)	7 September 1992	present	Emomali Rahmon (b. 1952)	

== See also ==
- President of Tajikistan
