= Safarali Kenjayev =

Tajik politician (1942–1999)

- Сафаралӣ Кенҷаев

Chairman of the Supreme Soviet of the Tajik SSR
- Preceded by: Akbarsho Iskandarov
- Succeeded by: Akbarsho Iskandarov
- In office 2 December 1991 – 22 April 1992
- In office 11 May 1992 – 11 August 1992

Personal details
- Born: 18 February 1942 Lenin District, Tajik SSR
- Died: 30 March 1999 (aged 57) Dushanbe, Tajikistan
- Party: Communist Party of the Soviet Union
- Education: Tajik State University
- Profession: Jurist, politician

Safarali Kenjayev (18 February 1942 – 30 March 1999) was a Tajik politician who served as the Speaker of the Supreme Soviet in Tajikistan 1991–1992, Chairman of the Tajik Parliament's committee on human rights and legislation, and as head of the Socialist Party of Tajikistan, which he founded.

== Early life ==
Kenjayev was born in 1942 in the Panjakent District. He was a member of the Yaghnobi community. An orphan, he was raised by the father of Haji Akbar Turajanzade.

== Career ==
=== Law ===
In 1965, Kenjayev graduated from Tajik State University with a degree in law. He started his career as a detective at the Public Prosecutor's Office. During his stint, Kenjayev was promoted to multiple positions, ranging from chief detective to deputy prosecutor of the Central Asian Railway.

=== Politics ===
After the 1991 presidential election, Rahmon Nabiyev elected Kenjayev as the chair of the Supreme Soviet and removed Qadriddin Aslonov from the position.

In 1992, the CIS placed restrictions on demonstrations and freedom of the press. The CIS arrested the mayor of Dushanbe, Maksud Ikromov on March 6, 1992.

In a televised Supreme Soviet meeting in March 1992, Kenjayev discredited Mamadayaz Navjavanov, the Minister of Internal Affairs, by attacking Navajavanov's ability of breaking up protests. Navajavanov was accused by Kenjayev of discriminating against the Uzbek people in the Ministry of Internal Affairs (MVD). Kenjayev also questioned Navjavanov's Tajik ethnicity and insulted the Badakhshan population. After the meeting, the Supreme Soviet dismissed Navjayanov of his duties.

The arrest of Ikromov and the dismissal of Navjayanov initiated the creation of the National Salvation Front alliance. The NSF sought for the ending of the Supreme Soviet and Kenjayev's resignation. On April 22, 1992, Kenjayev resigned from the Supreme Soviet, and was appointed in charge of the Committee of National Security (CNS). Kenjayev was then reinstated into the Supreme Soviet on May 3, 1992.

== Tajikistani Civil War ==
=== Dushanbe protests ===
In protest of Kenjayev's reinstatement, protesters demonstrated outside the legislature building in Dushanbe on May 7, 1992. They called for Kenjayev's dismissal for his alleged corruption and mismanagement. As the civil war broke out, Kenjayev and other leaders formed the Popular Front of Tajikistan.

=== Attempted coup ===
On 24 October 1992, Kenjayev led his army into Dushanbe, attacking the capital's presidential palace and parliament building. More than 150 people died. His forces, in control of the local radio station, proclaimed him the new president. After the coup, Kenjavey addressed the Tajik people, and said he would replace the leadership with a religious free government. Kenjavey also promised he would stop the civil war and restore the Nabiyev government.

After two days of negotiations with the President of Tajikistan Akbarsho Iskandarov, Kenjayev and his troops withdrew from Dushanbe.

== Death ==
On March 30, 1999, three assassins shot Kenjayev, his bodyguard, and his driver to their deaths in front of an apartment building in Dushanbe.
