= Davlat Usmon =

Tajikistani politician

Davlat Usmon Давлат Усмон

Personal details
- Party: Islamic Renaissance Party (1991–?)
- Other political affiliations: United Tajik Opposition (1993–1997)

Davlat Usmon (Tajik: Давлат Усмон) is a Tajikistani politician.

== Career ==
Usmon was a founding member of the Islamic Renaissance Party of Tajikistan in 1991, and one of its first deputy chairmen.

Usmon was a field commander for the United Tajik Opposition during the Tajikistan Civil War of the 1990s. A former Economics Minister, he was the Islamic Renaissance Party's candidate in the 1991 and 1999 presidential elections. He lost the election to incumbent president, Emomali Rahmon, gaining only 2.1% of the vote amidst criticism that the election was not free and fair.
