= Davlat Khudonazarov =

Tajik politician and human rights activist

Davlat Khudonazarov (Russian and Tajik: Давлат Худоназаров, Persian: دولت خدای‌نظرف) (1944 in Khorugh, Gorno-Badakhshan Autonomous Region, Tajik SSR) is a Tajikistani filmmaker, politician and human rights activist.

== Political career ==
Khudanazarov was a prominent filmmaker when he was elected People's Deputy from Tajikistan to the Supreme Soviet of the USSR in 1988. He was elected as chairman of the Soviet Union of Cinematographers in 1989. He was the chief peace-negotiator between the army and the demonstrators in the February 1990 Dushanbe riots.

In contrast to Kakhar Makhamov, the then president of Tajikistan who supported the August 1991 Coup in Moscow, Khudonazarov was one of the organizers of the counter-coup resistance. He ran against Rahmon Nabiev in the presidential elections in November 1991 as the candidate of the opposition coalition.

In the election Khudonazarov was supported by Pamiris, Gharmis and urban elites. He received 35% of the popular vote. Khudonazarov worked as a peacemaker during the Tajik Civil War (1992–1996). In 1994–95 he was Peace Fellow at the United States Institute of Peace, and Galina Starovoitova Fellow in Human Rights and Conflict Resolution at Kennan Institute of the Woodrow Wilson Center in 2005.

== Filmography ==
He has filmed many movies and documentaries as a director and cinematographer:

- V talom snege zvon ruchya (1982)
- Yunosti pervoe utro (1979)
- The Song of the Little Road (2003)

== See also ==
- Politics of Tajikistan
- CNN Interview with Davlat Khudonazarov
- Davlat Khudonazarov at IMDb
