= Mariam Nabieva =

First Lady of Tajikistan 1991–1992 (1937–2017)

- Майрам Набиева

First Lady of Tajikistan
- In role 2 December 1991 – 7 September 1992
- President: Rahmon Nabiyev
- Preceded by: Gavkhar Makhkamova
- Succeeded by: Azizmo Asadullayeva (1992)

Personal details
- Born: c. 1937
- Died: 28 December 2017 (aged 80) Khujand, Tajikistan
- Spouse: Rahmon Nabiyev (?–1993; his death)
- Children: 3

Mayram or Mariam Saidulloevna Nabieva (Tajik: Майрам Саидуллоевна Набиева; c. 1937 – 28 December 2017) was the First Lady of Tajikistan from 1991 until 1992 and the wife of the country's first elected president, Rahmon Nabiyev.

== Death ==
Nabieva died from smoke inhalation during a fire at her home in Khujand, Tajikistan, on 28 December 2017. She was 80 years old. The cause of the fire was investigated as a possible arson.
