= Azizmo Asadullayeva =

First Lady of Tajikistan

- Азизмо Асадуллаева
- Asadullayeva in 2011

First Lady of Tajikistan
- Assumed role 7 September 1992
- President: Emomali Rahmon
- Preceded by: Mariam Nabieva

Personal details
- Born: July 19, 1955 (age 71) Kaganovichabad, Khatlon Region, Tajik SSR, Soviet Union (now Jaloliddin Balkhi District, Tajikistan)
- Citizenship: Tajikistan
- Spouse: Emomali Rahmon (m. 1970s)
- Children: 9, including Ozoda and Rustam

Azizmo Asadullayeva (Tajik: Азизмоҳ Асадуллоева) is the wife of the President of Tajikistan Emomali Rahmon, serving First Lady of Tajikistan since September 7, 1992.

== Biography ==
Asadulloeva was born on 19 July 1955 in the village of Navobod in the Kaganovichabad District. She studied at secondary school No. 33 in the Kolkhozabad (now Balkh, Tajikistan) until the 8th grade, after which she did not continue her studies in order to help her mother.

For some time she was the head of the family unit of the Lenin collective farm in the Danghara District. In 2013, representatives of small businesses in Tajikistan proposed appointing the first lady as the head of the country's Entrepreneurs Association, but Emomali Rahmon rejected the idea. In 2016, theologian Abdullo Muhaqqiq proposed to grant her the status of “leader of Islamic women” (similar to her husband's status as “leader of the nation”) due to her becoming the first Muslim woman from Central Asia to pray in the Kaaba at Mecca.

== Personal life ==
She is married to Emomali Rahmon and has seven daughters and two sons.

Her mother, Uzbekbi Asadulloeva, died in July 2021 from COVID-19 at the age of 88. Her brother Hasan Asadullozoda, was head of Orienbank and owner of Somon Air. Another brother, Amonullo Asadulloyev, is the head of Somon Sughd, while another one, Amirullo Asadullo, was Mayor of Bokhtar. Another one Rahmatullo Sadulloev, controlled farmland and businesses in the Khatlon.
