= Khujand clan =

The Khujand clan, also known as the Leninabad clan, is the name given to political alliance based in Khujand, Tajikistan. The clan largely controlled the Government of Tajikistan from World War II until the Tajik Civil War.

Rahmon Nabiyev, a member of the Khujand clan, became the President of Tajikistan in November 1991. He served until August 1992 when he was forced to resign at gunpoint.
