= Chairman of the Oblast Soviet of Gorno-Badhakshan =

The Chairman of the Oblast Soviet of Gorno-Badhakshan was the presiding officer of that legislature.

Name	Period
Akbarsho Iskandrov	1990 - 1993
Garibzho Shabozov	1993 - ?

== Sources ==
- Various editions of The Europa World Year book
