= 2016 Tajik constitutional referendum =

- 22 May 2016
- Are you in favor of amendments and amendments to the Constitution (Basic Law) of the Republic of Tajikistan?

Results
Choice	Votes	%
Yes	3,834,862	96.60%
No	134,877	3.40%
Valid votes	3,969,739	97.79%
Invalid or blank votes	89,683	2.21%
Total votes	4,059,422	100.00%
Registered voters/turnout	4,430,116	91.63%

A constitutional referendum was held in Tajikistan on 22 May 2016. A total of 41 constitutional amendments were proposed. The changes included:

- amending Article 65 to remove presidential term limits for Emomali Rahmon
- reducing the minimum age to run for president from 35 to 30
- banning political parties based on religious platforms

According to official figures, the changes were approved by 96.6% of voters. Voter turnout was claimed to be 92%. The conduct of the referendum was problematic.

== Analysis ==
On a practical level, incumbent President Emomali Rahmon would be allowed to run for re-election indefinitely under the changes. Rahmon has been the President of Tajikistan for close to a quarter of a century, showing what critics say was an increased disregard for religious freedoms, civil society, and political pluralism in recent years.

The reduction in minimum age to run for president allows Rahmon's son to run, because he would be 33 at the end of his father's current term. The religious party restriction most notably impacts the main opposition Islamic Renaissance Party, which was outlawed in 2015. Some analysts claim that the changes violate the terms of the peace deal that ended the Tajikistani Civil War.

== Conduct ==
According to Reporters Without Borders, the Tajik government had been "blocking", "intimidating" and "threatening" independent media in the buildup to the referendum. According to Sergey Sirotkin, who headed the Russian observing mission, "[t]he referendum was held in full compliance with the laws". Observers from the Organization for Security and Co-operation in Europe and its subsidiary ODIHR were denied entry and permission to observe the referendum.

Over 3,200 polling stations were placed in the country, with additional posts available in several major Russian cities for Tajik expatriates.

== Results ==
Voters were presented with the question: "Do you approve amendments to the country’s constitution?" Under the country’s law, the referendum result is valid if more than half of voters approved it.

Choice	Votes	%
For	3,834,862	96.60
Against	134,877	3.40
Total	3,969,739	100.00
Valid votes	3,969,739	97.79
Invalid/blank votes	89,683	2.21
Total votes	4,059,422	100.00
Registered voters/turnout	4,430,116	91.63
Source: Asia Plus
