= Vice President of Tajikistan =

- Муовини президенти Тоҷикистон; Вице-президент Таджикистана
- State Emblem

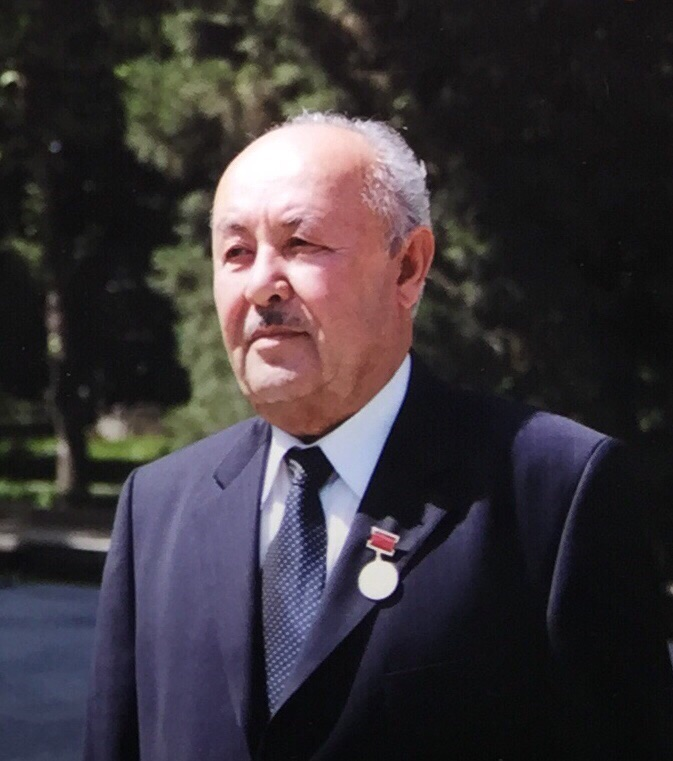
- Izatullo Khayoyev
- Style: Mr. Vice President (informally); Your Excellency (international correspondence)
- Residence: Dushanbe
- Appointer: President
- Precursor: Chairman of the Council of Ministers of the Tajik SSR
- Formation: December 1990
- First holder: Izatullo Khayoyev
- Final holder: Narzullo Dustov
- Abolished: May 1992
- Succession: Prime Minister of Tajikistan

The office of vice president of Tajikistan was a political position in Tajikistan until it was abolished.

The following is a list people who have served as Vice President of Tajikistan until its abolishment:

Vice President	President	Entered office	Left office	Notes
Izatullo Khayoyev	Qahhor Mahkamov	December 1990	June 1991	
Narzullo Dustov	Rahmon Nabiyev	2 December 1991	May 1992	

== See also ==
- List of leaders of Tajikistan
- President of Tajikistan
- Prime Minister of Tajikistan
