= Tajikistani Revolution =

1992 protests in Tajikistan

1992 Tajikistan protests
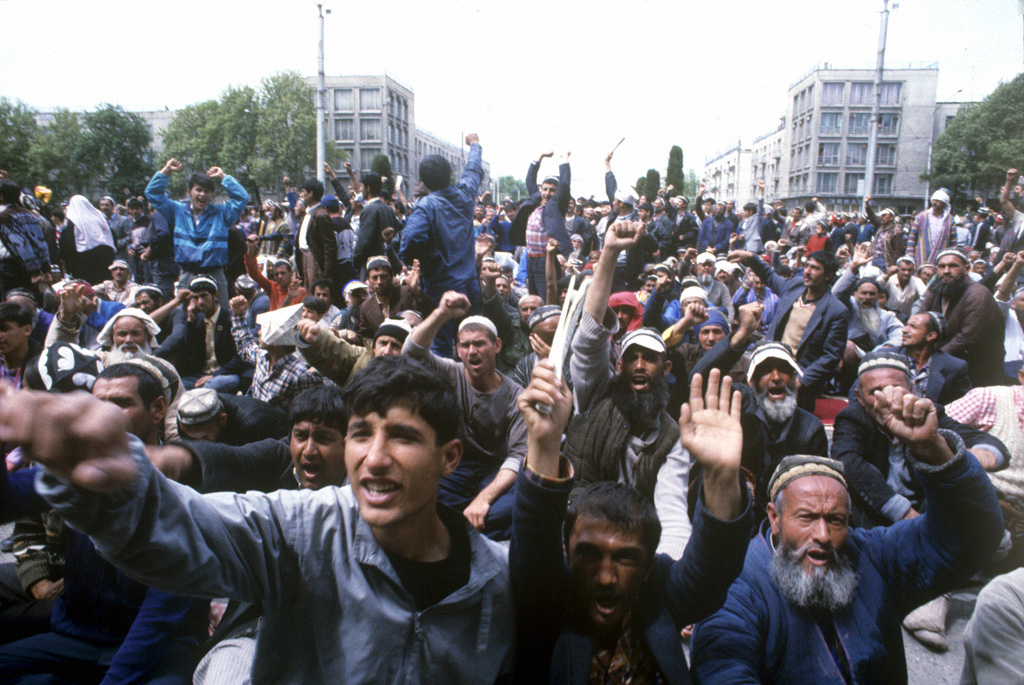
- An anti-government rally at Shakhidon square, Dushanbe in May 1992
- Date: 26 March 1992 - 7 September 1992
- Location: Tajikistan
- Caused by: Alleged rigging of the 1991 Tajik presidential election
- Goals: Resignation of President Rahmon Nabiyev; Fresh elections; Better conditions
- Methods: Demonstrations
- Result: Protests suppressed by pro-government factions; Beginning of Tajikistani Civil War

Deaths and injuries
- Death: 1
- Injuries: unknown

The 1992 Tajikistan protests, also known as the Tajikistani Revolution, were nonviolent, bloodless protests and demonstrations against the results of the 1991 Tajik presidential election. These results were thought to be rigged and in favour of the president Rahmon Nabiyev. Opposition rallies erupted on 26 March 1992 but demonstrations became large-scale by May, at the onset of violence. These series of peaceful protests would lead to the bloody Tajikistani Civil War.

== Background ==
Tajikistan was part of the Soviet Union as the Tajik SSR. The introduction of perestroika and glasnost policies by Mikhail Gorbachev, last president of the USSR led to a series of political and economic upheavals that led to the unraveling of the political and economic system in place and greater influence by actors outside the Communist Party. In 1990, the Dushanbe riots took place against immigration from outside the republic and the government. After the failed August coup against Gorbachev in 1991, the republican authorities proclaimed independence and set presidential elections on November 24, which was won by communist leader Rahmon Nabiyev in disputed circumstances.

== Protests ==
Protests surrounding the election results escalated into clashes in March 1992, but soon subsided. Quiet protests and small demonstrations took place in April. Mass strikes and major demonstrations then resumed throughout the country, demanding the resignation of the government and President Nabiyev. The government responded by arming militias and quelling the demonstrators with guns and tanks, sparking more clashes. The unrest spiraled out of control, with a particular clash in Khujand, Tajikistan's second-largest city, sparking the 5 year long Tajikistani Civil War. After weeks of mass strikes and demonstrations, the protesters captured the Nabiyev and forced him to resign.

== See also ==
- Rahmon Nabiyev
- Tajikistani Civil War
