= Somon Palace =

Palace building in Dushanbe, Tajikistan

Coordinates: 38°36′3.5″N 68°47′26.5″E

The Somon Palace (Tajik: Кохи Сомон), also known as the Palace of the Samanids, is a building in Dushanbe, Tajikistan. It is named after the Persianate Samanid Empire (819–999). The palace is used for state-level meetings. It also serves as the residence of the Government of Tajikistan.

== Building ==
Somon Palace is the largest building at the reserve of the President of Tajikistan. The palace premises cover a total of 22,000 square meters. On the five floors of the building there are numerous representative halls, specially equipped for the holding of major international meetings. Halls in the palace include: the banquet hall, the congress hall, the contract signing room, the negotiation hall and the tête-à-tête hall. The building was developed by the Russian company Art Parquet.

== Specific events ==
- Navruz celebrations take place inside the palace.
- The 2008 SCO summit was held at Somon Palace.
- Sessions of the Council of Heads of State of the Commonwealth in Dushanbe have been held at the palace.
- Presidential inaugurations of the President of Tajikistan have been held in the palace.
