= 1999 Tajik presidential election =

- 6 November 1999
- Registered: 2,866,578
- Turnout: 98.92% (▲3.91pp)
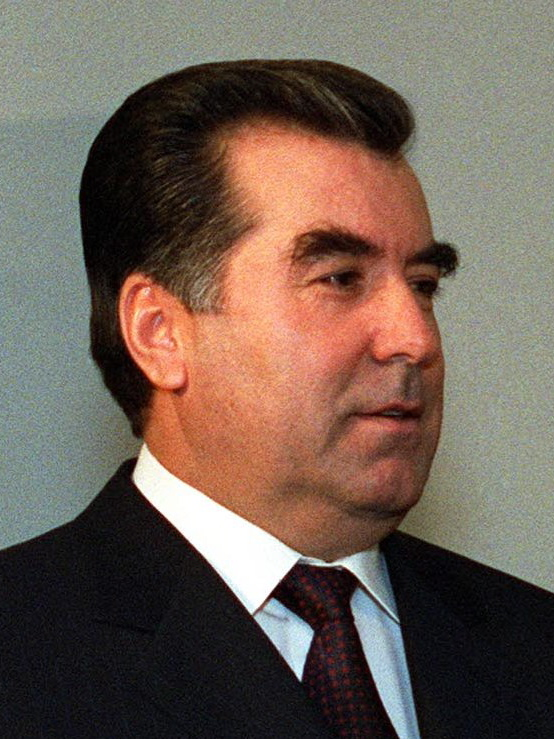

Nominee	Emomali Rahmonov	Davlat Usmon
Party	PDP	Islamic Renaissance
Popular vote	2,749,908	59,857
Percentage	97.62%	2.12%
- Results by district
President before election
Emomali Rahmonov
PDP
Elected President
Emomali Rahmonov
PDP

Presidential elections were held in Tajikistan on 6 November 1999. They were won by the incumbent, Emomali Rahmonov, who received 98% of the vote. The opposition, who had demanded the elections be postponed, amid claims that the government obstructed candidates from registering as candidates, described the result as illegal.

International observers were also critical of the elections, particularly regarding the issues of candidate registration, media access and voting irregularities, including multiple voting. The incumbent government had tight control over media, preventing independent and opposition perspectives.

Turnout was reported to be 99% of the 2,866,578 registered voters.

== Results ==
Candidate	Party	Votes	%
Emomali Rahmonov	People's Democratic Party	2,749,908	97.62
Davlat Usmon	Islamic Renaissance Party	59,857	2.12
Against all		7,051	0.25
Total		2,816,816	100.00
Valid votes		2,816,816	99.34
Invalid/blank votes		18,774	0.66
Total votes		2,835,590	100.00
Registered voters/turnout		2,866,578	98.92
Source: Nohlen et al.
