= Narzullo Dustov =

Tajikistani politician (1939/1940–2022)

- Нарзулло Дӯстов

2nd Vice President of Tajikistan
- In office 2 December 1991 – May 1992
- President: Rahmon Nabiyev
- Preceded by: Izatullo Khayoyev
- Succeeded by: Office Abolished

Personal details
- Born: Darvoz District, Tajikistan
- Died: 1 November 2022 (aged 82)

Narzullo Dustov was a politician from Tajikistan who served as Vice President of Tajikistan from 1991 to 1992 and Deputy Chairman of the Supreme Soviet.

== Personal life ==
Dustov was born in Darvoz District during 1939 or 1940.

On 6 May 1994, an assassination was attempted when some individuals fired at him with machine gun inside the car. In this attempt, the deputy and bodyguard were wounded.

Dustov died in Uzbekistan on 1 November 2022 from cancer aged 82. He was buried in Tashkent.
