= 1994 Tajik presidential election =

- 6 November 1994
- Registered: 2,535,777
- Turnout: 95.01% (▲8.52pp)
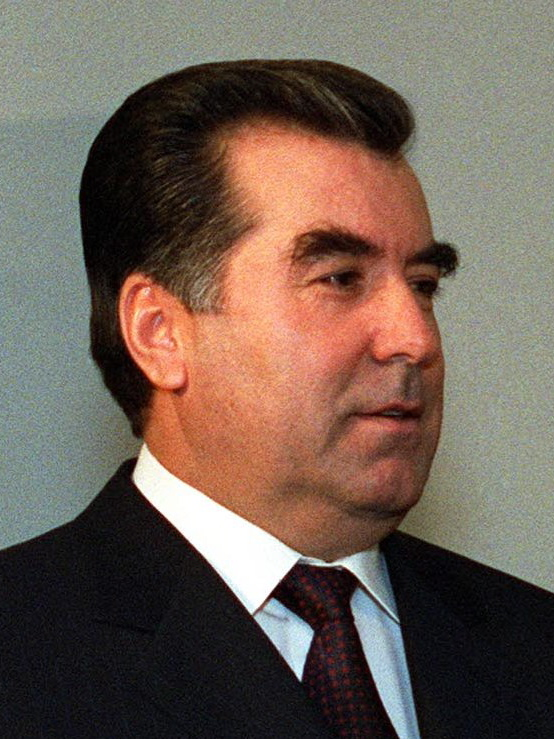

Nominee	Emomali Rahmonov	Abdumalik Abdullajanov
Party	Independent	Independent
Popular vote	1,434,437	835,861
- Results by district Rahmonov Abdullajanov
President before election
Emomali Rahmonov
Independent
Elected President
Emomali Rahmonov
Independent

Presidential elections were held in Tajikistan on 6 November 1994. Emomali Rahmonov, who had been de facto president since 1992, ran for the revived post with the support (though not the formal nomination) of the Communist Party of Tajikistan and won with 1,434,437 votes. Voter turnout was 95%.

== Background ==
The elections took place amidst the ongoing civil war, although a round of talks in Tehran in September 1994 provided for a formal cease-fire, scheduled to end on 5 November. The initial scheduled date for the elections was 25 September, but by early September only Rahmonov was registered. The Russian and Uzbek governments put pressure on Rahmonov, resulting in the postponement of the election to 6 November and extension of the nomination deadline until 27 October.

== Campaign ==
Although the second registered candidate, Abdumalik Abdullajanov, was not a decoy figure, the main opposition forces had not been allowed to form political parties and were effectively shut out of political activity prior to the elections. As a result, the opposition boycotted the elections, saying that a fair contest was impossible with Rahmonov in power.

== Conduct ==
The election process was described in a 1995 US State Department report as favoring the incumbent ruler and being non-fair: intimidation and ballot-box stuffing was reported, vote rigging was suspected.

== Results ==
Candidate	Votes	%
Emomali Rahmonov	1,434,437	
Abdumalik Abdullajanov	835,861	
Against all		
Total		
Total votes	2,409,330	–
Registered voters/turnout	2,535,777	95.01
Source: Nohlen et al.
