= 2003 Tajik constitutional referendum =

- 22 June 2003
- Do you accept amendments to the Constitution of Tajikistan, Yes or No?

Results
Choice	Votes	%
Yes	2,261,250	92.81%
No	175,246	7.19%

A constitutional referendum was held in Tajikistan on 22 June 2003. The changes included removing Article 65, which limited the President to a single term of office. The changes also extended the president's term to 14 years. They were approved by 93% of voters, with a turnout of 96%.

International observers described the conduct of the referendum as problematic.

== Results ==
Choice	Votes	%
For	2,261,250	92.81
Against	175,246	7.19
Total	2,436,496	100.00
Registered voters/turnout		96
Source: New Humanitarian
