= Orienbank =

Private joint-stock bank in Tajikistan

- Type: Private/Cooperative
- Industry: Banking
- Founded: 1925
- Headquarters: Dushanbe, Tajikistan
- Key people: Hasan Asadullozoda, Chairman; Ismatulloev Shuhrat Abdugafforovich, First Vice-chairman; Salimova Lola Djumaevna, Vice-chairman; Sulaymonbekov Rajabbek Anoyatbekovich, Vice-chairman; Bakoev Dilshod Todjiddinovich, Chief Accountant
- Website: oriyonbonk.tj/en

Orienbank (Tajik: ҶСК “Ориёнбонк”) is one of the oldest banks in Tajikistan, and one of its largest financial institutions.

In June 2023, the then-current deputy chairman of Orienbank, Shohrat Ismattuloev, was kidnapped and killed. Ismattuloev had been subjected to torture, and his body was found nearly two months later.
