= Emomali Rahmon =

President of Tajikistan since 1994

Leader of the Nation; Emomali Rahmon
- Эмомалӣ Раҳмон
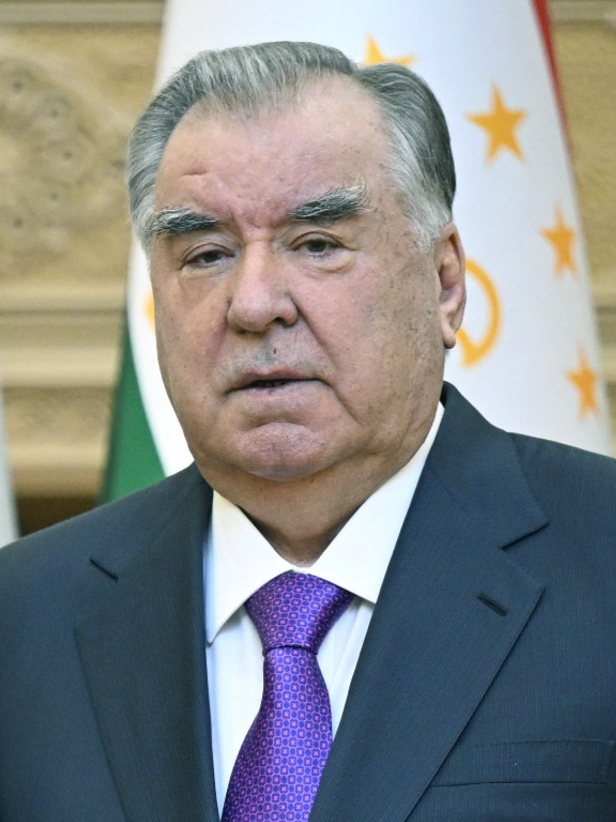
- Rahmon in 2026

3rd President of Tajikistan
- Incumbent
- Assumed office 16 November 1994
- Prime Minister: Abdujalil Samadov; Jamshed Karimov; Yahyo Azimov; Oqil Oqilov; Kokhir Rasulzoda
- Preceded by: Office re-established; Himself (as de facto Leader); Rahmon Nabiyev (as President, 1992)

Leader of the People's Democratic Party
- Incumbent
- Assumed office 18 March 1998
- Preceded by: Abdulmajid Dostiev

Leader of Tajikistan (Note: Following the abolishment of the presidency, Rahmon served as Tajikistan's de facto leader as the chairman of the Supreme Soviet of Tajikistan and head of the New Tajik Administration until 16 November 1994, when he assumed the presidency.)
- De facto 20 November 1992 – 16 November 1994
- Prime Minister: Akbar Mirzoyev; Abdumalik Abdullajanov; Abdujalil Samadov
- Preceded by: Akbarsho Iskandarov (as Acting President)
- Succeeded by: Himself (as President)

7th Chairman of the Supreme Soviet of Tajikistan
- In office 20 November 1992 – 16 November 1994
- Preceded by: Akbarsho Iskandarov
- Succeeded by: Position abolished

Personal details
- Born: Emomali Sharipovich Rahmonov; 5 October 1952 (age 74) Danghara, Kulob Oblast, Tajik SSR, Soviet Union (now Tajikistan)
- Party: People's Democratic Party (since 1994)
- Other political affiliations: CPSU (1990–1991); CPT (1990–1994)
- Spouse: Azizmo Asadullayeva (m. 1970s)
- Children: 9, including Ozoda and Rustam
- Education: Tajik State National University

Military service
- Allegiance: Soviet Union; Tajikistan
- Branch: Soviet Navy; Armed Forces of the Republic of Tajikistan
- Years of service: 1971–1974 (Soviet Union); 1992–present (Tajikistan)
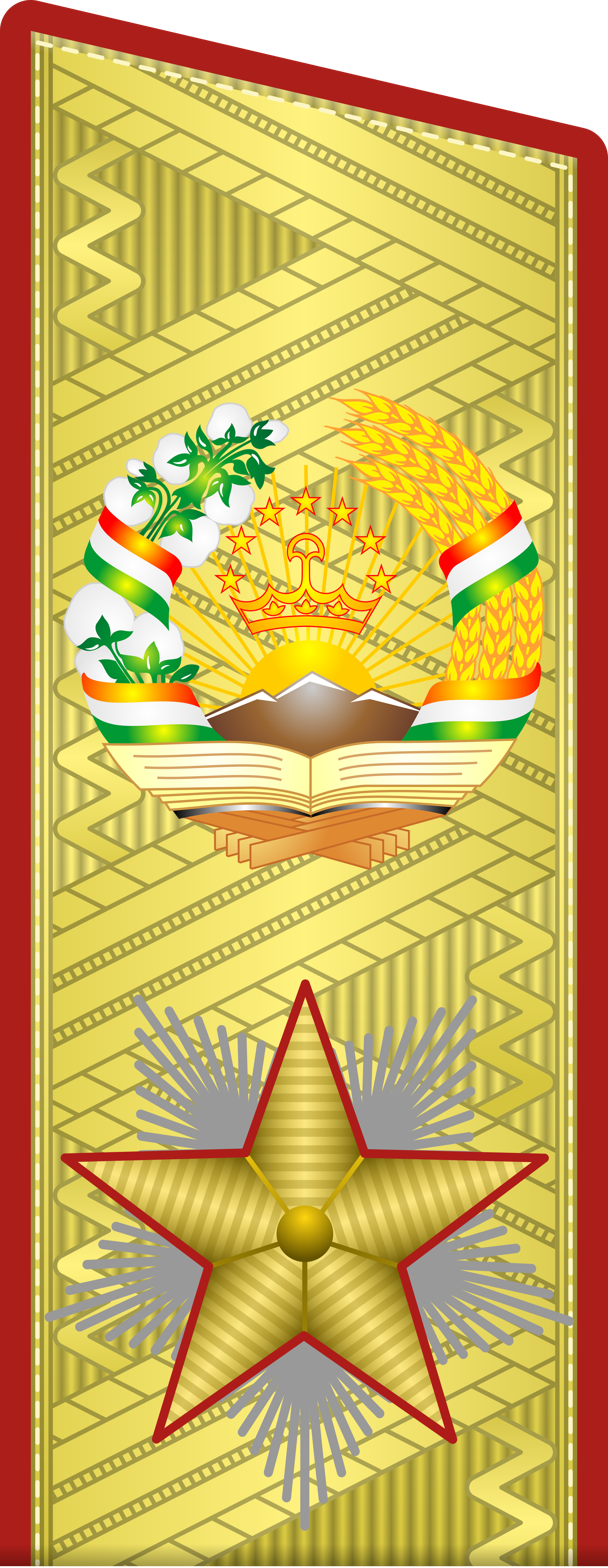
- Rank: General of the Army

Emomali Rahmon (Note: Tajik: Эмомалӣ Раҳмон [emɔmaˈli raɦˈmɔn]) (born Emomali Sharipovich Rahmonov; (Note: Birthname appears variously as Emomali Sharipovich Rakhmonov, Imamali Sharipovich Rakhmanov or Imomali Sharipovich Rakhmonov—the romanized forms of his Russian name Эмомали Шарипович Рахмонов or Имамали Шарипович Рахманов) 5 October 1952) is a Tajikistani politician who has served as the third president of Tajikistan since 1994, having previously led the country as Chairman of the Supreme Assembly from 1992 to 1994. Since 1998, he has also served as the leader of the People's Democratic Party of Tajikistan, which dominates the Parliament of Tajikistan. On 30 September 1999, he was elected vice-president of the United Nations General Assembly for a one-year term.

Born in Danghara to a peasant family, he became a rising apparatchik in Tajikistan as he became the chairman of the collective state farm of his native Danghara. According to his official biography, Rahmon graduated from the Tajik State National University with a specialist's degree in economics in 1982. After working for several years in the Danghara Sovkhoz, Rahmon was appointed chairman of the sovkhoz in 1987 and later as a people’s deputy to the Supreme Soviet for the Tajik SSR.

He became better known in 1992 after the abolition of the presidency amidst the civil war, when he became Chairman of the Supreme Soviet (Parliament) of Tajikistan as a compromise candidate between communists and neo-communists on one side and liberal-democratic, nationalist and Islamist forces (the United Tajik Opposition) on the other. Rahmon has won five undemocratic presidential elections. In addition, he extended his powers via constitutional referendums in 1999 and 2003. Following the results of another constitutional referendum in 2016, amendments were adopted that removed presidential term limits.

Rahmon heads an authoritarian government in Tajikistan. Political opponents are repressed, violations of human rights and freedoms are severe, elections are not free and fair, and corruption and nepotism are rampant. Various important government positions are occupied by his family members, such as his 38-year-old son Rustam Emomali, who is the chairman of the country's parliament and the mayor of its capital city, Dushanbe.

== Early life ==
Rahmon was born as Emomali Sharipovich Rakhmonov (Note: Russian: Эмомали́ Шари́пович Рахмо́нов, romanized: Emomalí Sharípovich Rahmónov) to Sharif Rahmonov (c. 1912–1992) and Mayram Sharifova (1910–2004), a peasant family in Danghara, Kulob Oblast (present-day Khatlon Region). His father was a Red Army veteran of World War II and recipient of the Order of Glory in the 2nd and 3rd degrees. From 1971 to 1974, Rahmon served in the Soviet Union's Pacific Fleet, during which he was stationed in the Primorsky Krai. After completing military service, Rahmon returned to his native village, where he worked for some time as an electrician.

As a rising apparatchik in Tajikistan, he became the chairman of the collective state farm of his native Danghara. According to his official biography, Rahmon graduated from the Tajik State National University with a specialist's degree in economics in 1982. After working for several years in the Danghara Sovkhoz, Rahmon was appointed chairman of the sovkhoz in 1987.

== Early politics ==
In 1990, Rahmon was elected a people's deputy to the Supreme Soviet of the Tajik SSR. President Rahmon Nabiyev was forced to resign in the first months of the Civil War in August 1992. Akbarsho Iskandrov, Speaker of the Supreme Soviet, became acting president. Iskandarov resigned in November 1992 in an attempt to end the civil unrest. That same month, the Supreme Soviet met in Khujand for its 16th session and declared Tajikistan a parliamentary republic. Rahmon was then elected by the members of the Supreme Soviet as its chairman (as the parliamentary republican system adopted by Tajikistan did not provide for a ceremonial president, he was also head of state) and the head of government. Former Interior Minister Yaqub Salimov later recalled that Rahmon's appointment was made because he was "nondescript", as other field commanders thought that he could be cast aside "when he had served his purpose."

== Presidency (1994–present) ==
In 1994, a new constitution re-established the presidency. Rahmon was elected to the post on 6 November 1994 and sworn in ten days later. During the civil war that lasted from 1992 to 1997, Rahmon's rule was opposed by the United Tajik Opposition. As many as 100,000 people died during the war. He survived an assassination attempt on 30 April 1997 in Khujand, as well as two attempted coups in August 1997 and November 1998. He was re-elected on 6 November 1999 to a seven-year term following constitutional changes, officially taking 97% of the vote.

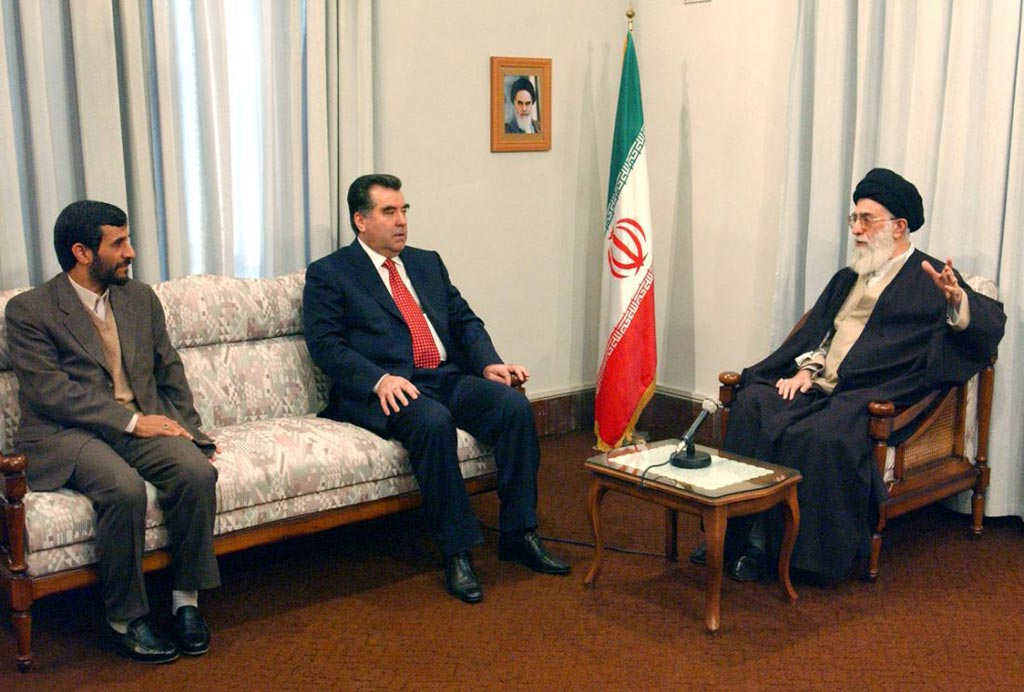
Tajik president with Iranian president Mahmoud Ahmadinejad and supreme leader Ali Khamenei, January 2006

On 22 June 2003, a referendum was passed, allowing him to run for two more consecutive seven-year terms after his term expired in 2006. Rahmon was re-elected for a seven-year term in a controversial election on 6 November 2006, with about 79% of the vote, according to official results.

In a cable dispatch that was leaked in 2010, the U.S. embassy in Dushanbe reported that Tajikistan's largest bank was controlled by Rahmon and his family. The same leaked diplomatic cable also contains confidential marked information on how the Tajik president diverts to himself most of the revenues from the country's biggest industries, hydroelectricity and exported aluminum.

On 6 November 2013, he was re-elected for more seven years in office with about 84% of the vote, in an election process which the Organization for Security and Co-operation in Europe said lacked "genuine choice and meaningful pluralism".

In December 2015, a law passed by Tajikistan's parliament gave Rahmon the title "Founder of Peace and National Unity – Leader of the Nation" (Tajik: Асосгузори сулҳу ваҳдати миллӣ – Пешвои миллат, romanized: Asosguzori sulhu vahdati millî – Peshvo'i millat). The "Leader of the Nation" component is used frequently as a shorter title. In addition to granting Rahmon lifelong immunity from prosecution, the law also granted him many other lifelong privileges, including veto power over all major state decisions, the freedom to address the nation and parliament on all matters he deems important, and the privilege of attending all government meetings and parliamentary sessions.

On 22 May 2016, a nationwide referendum approved a number of changes to the country's constitution. Among the main changes were the removal of presidential term limits for Rahmon, a ban on religious political parties such as the Islamic Renaissance Party, and the reduction of the minimum eligibility age for presidential candidates from 35 to 30, enabling Rahmon's older son, Rustam Emomali, to run for president any time after 2017. The conduct for the referendum has been questioned, as Reporters Without Borders had claimed the Tajik government had been "blocking", "intimidating" and "threatening" independent media just before it. In January 2017, Rustam was appointed Mayor of Dushanbe, the country's largest city and capital.

In November 2018, Rahmon relaunched a hydroelectric station project to solve energy problems. In October 2020, he was once again re-elected as president for a fifth term with a margin of 90.92%, amid fraud allegations. In July 2021, over 1,000 Afghan troops and civilians fled to Tajikistan after Taliban insurgents took control of many parts of Afghanistan. In response, Rahmon ordered 20,000 reserve servicemen of the country's Ground Forces to be sent to the Afghan–Tajik border.

=== Religious policy ===
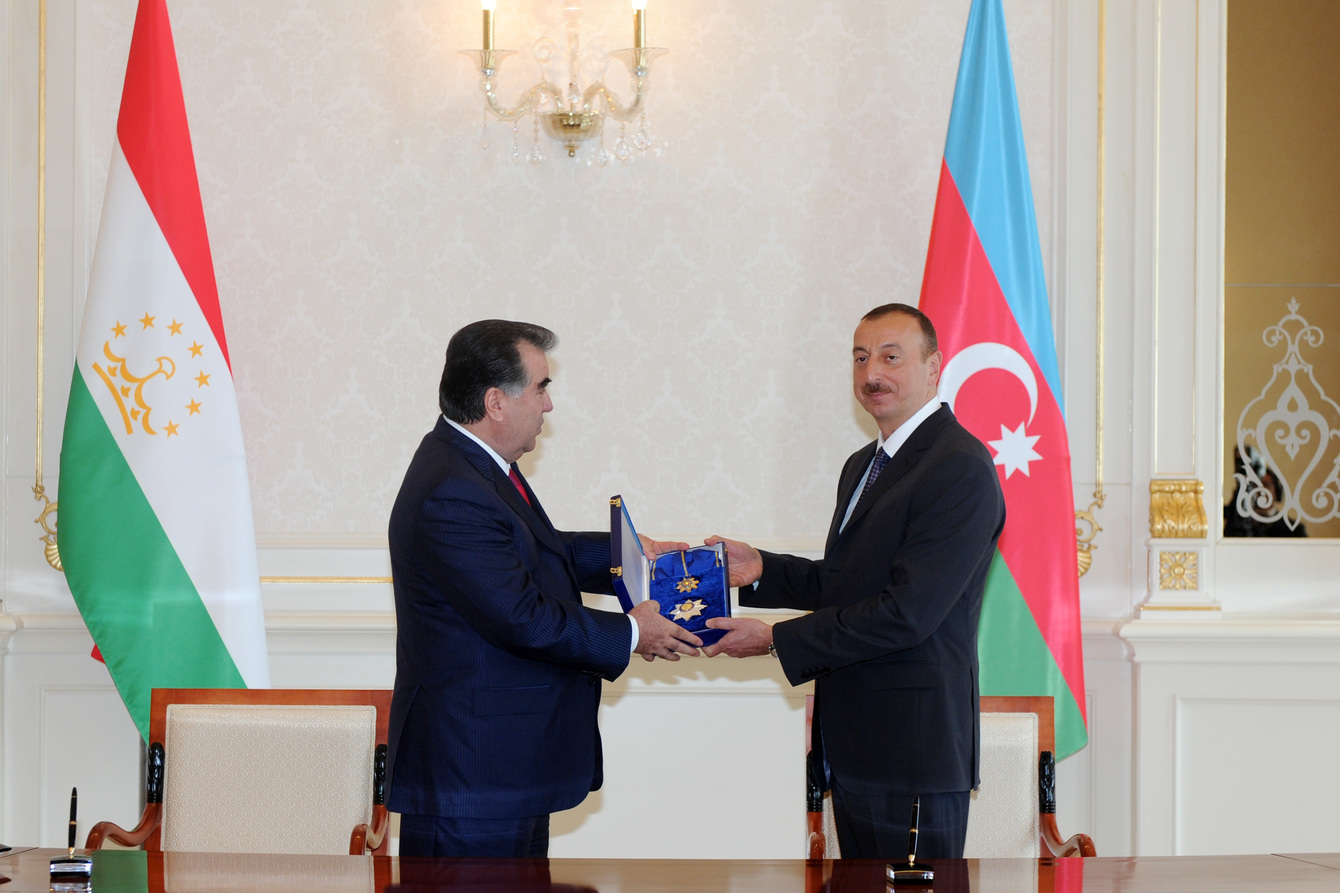
Rahmon with Azerbaijani President Ilham Aliyev in Baku, December 2012

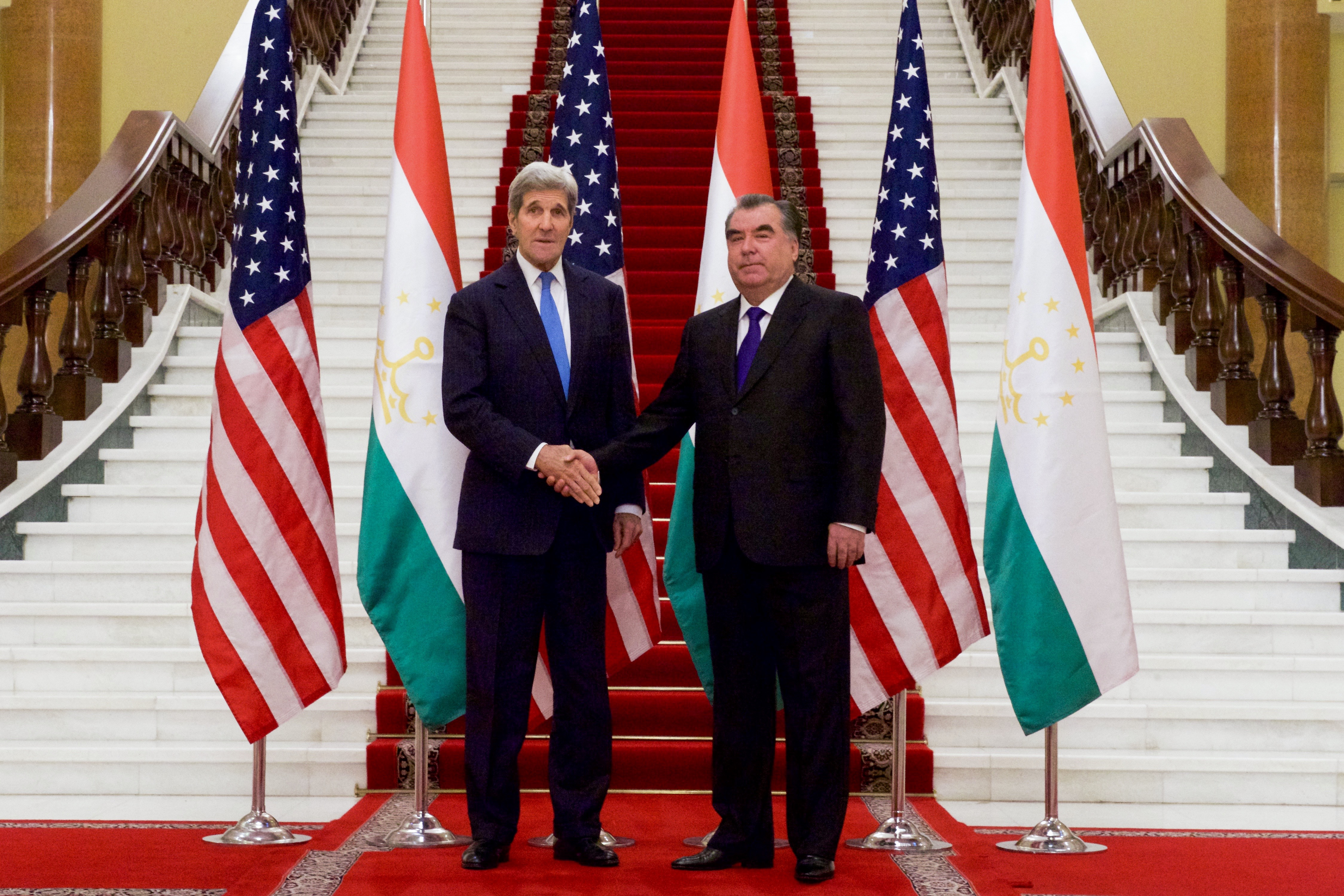
U.S. Secretary of State John Kerry with Rahmon, 2015

Rahmon is a Sunni Muslim and has frequently stressed his Muslim background even though his administration has suppressed public display of Islamic devotion. The government imposed bans on beards, attendance at mosque for women and children under 18, hajj for people under 40, studying in Islamic schools outside Tajikistan, the production, import or export of Islamic books without permission, using loudspeakers to broadcast the adhan, veils, madrassas, Islamist political parties, and Arabic-sounding names. Furthermore, mosques are heavily regulated; providing unofficial Islamic teaching can lead to up to 12 years of imprisonment, and an arduous process is required to obtain a permit to establish an Islamic organisation, publish an Islamic book, or go on pilgrimage to Mecca. In January 2016, Rahmon performed an Umrah with a number of his children and senior members of his government. It was his fourth pilgrimage to Mecca.

His reply to critics of the election standards of the 2006 Tajikistani presidential election was:

"In Tajikistan, more than 99 percent of those residing here are Muslim. We have a completely different culture. You have to take that into account".

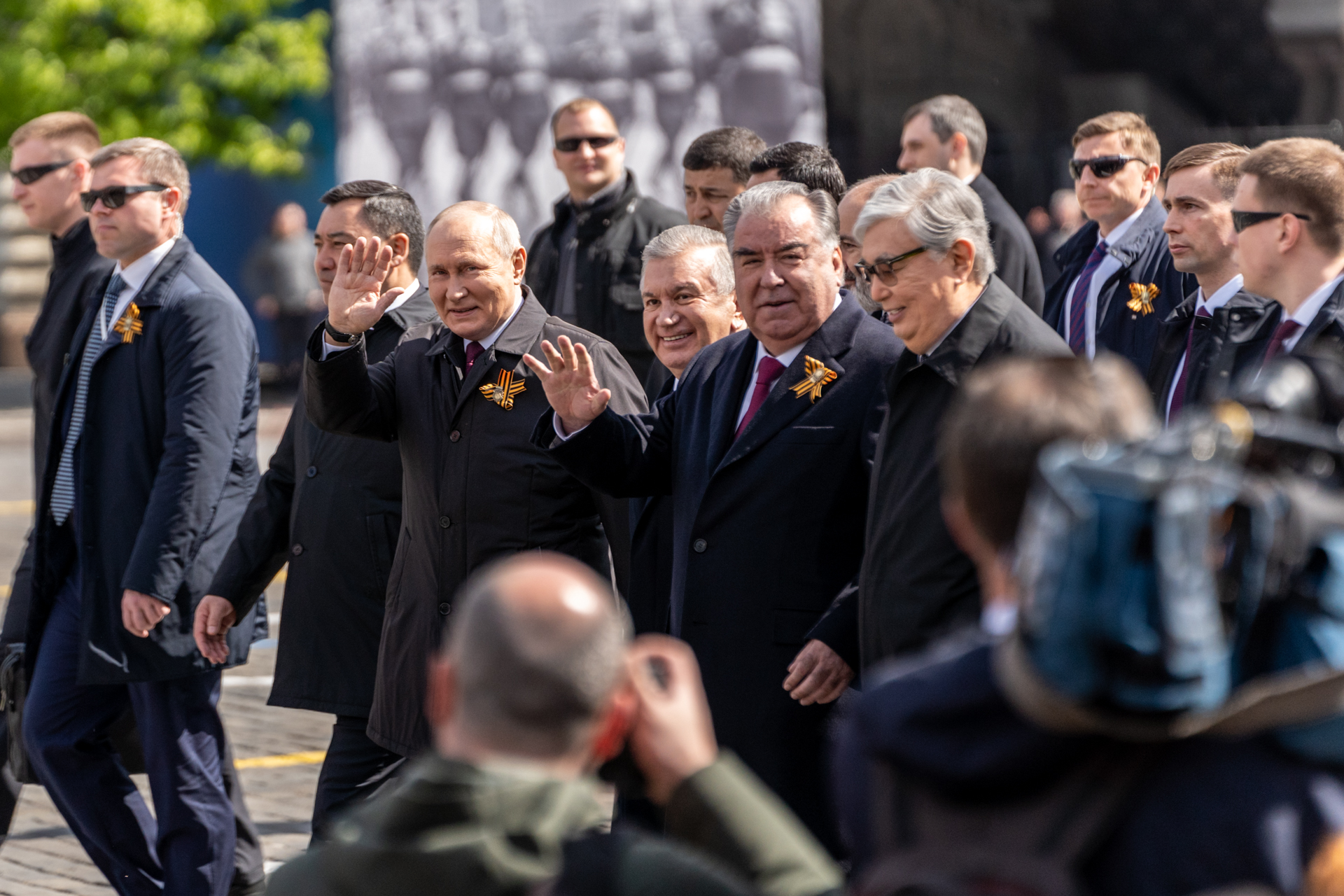
Rahmon with Putin and other post-Soviet leaders at the 2023 Moscow Victory Day Parade

During a 2010 Organisation of Islamic Cooperation session in Dushanbe, Rahmon spoke against what he called the misuse of Islam for political ends, claiming that "Terrorism, terrorists, have no nation, no country, no religion... Using the name 'Islamic terrorism' only discredits Islam and dishonors the pure and harmless religion of Islam."

Membership in Hizb ut-Tahrir, a militant Islamic party that aims to overthrow secular governments and unify Muslims under one Islamic state, is illegal and members are subject to arrest and imprisonment. The Islamic Renaissance Party of Tajikistan (IRP) is a banned Islamist political party and has been designated a terrorist organization since 2015.

In 2017, the government of Tajikistan passed a law requiring people to "stick to traditional national clothes and culture", which has been widely seen as an attempt to prevent women from wearing Islamic clothing, in particular the style of headscarf wrapped under the chin that is in contrast to the traditional Tajik headscarf tied behind the head.

By 2024, the Salafi movement and polygamy became popular in Tajikistan, despite both officially being banned by the government.

=== Economic policy ===
Under Rahmon, the state intervenes in the economy, which a focus more on state-led investment rather than private investment. In the late 1990s, the economic system of Tajikistan under Rahmon was described as statist.

== Personal life ==
=== Family ===
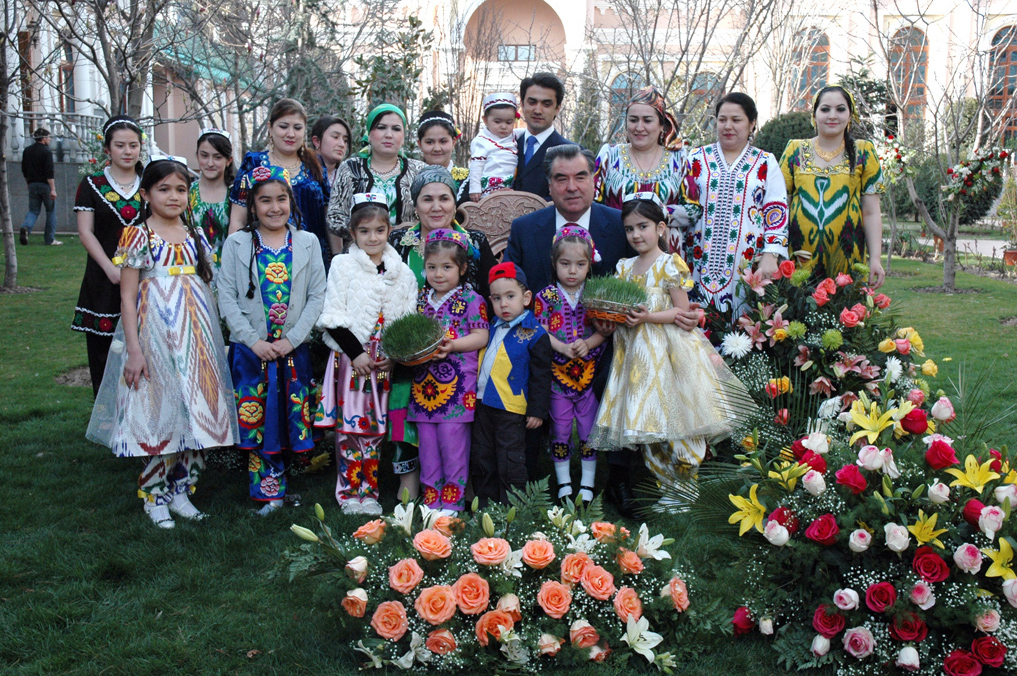
Emomali Rahmon with his family, 2011

He is married to Azizmo Asadullayeva and has nine children. Two of his children, Rustam Emomali and Ozoda Rahmon, are senior officials in his administration, while another, Zarina Rahmon, was appointed deputy head of Orienbank in January 2017. Rustam is widely believed to be his father's successor.

Rahmon had a sister who reportedly died in a hospital of COVID-19 on 20 July 2021. According to local media, her sons physically assaulted the national health minister and a senior doctor.

One of his grandchildren reportedly purchased a luxury three-bedroom beachfront apartment on Dubai's Palm Jumeirah when he was just nine years old. The property, now valued at over $1.3 million, continues to generate approximately $55,000 in annual rental income.

=== Name changes ===
In March 2007, Rahmonov changed his surname to Rahmon, dropping the Russian-style "-ov" ending. He also removed the patronymic, Sharipovich, from his name altogether. Rahmon explained that he had done so out of respect for his cultural heritage. Following the move, scores of government officials, including members of parliament and civil servants, also removed Russian-style patronymics and "-ov" endings from their surnames. In April 2016, Tajikistan officially banned giving Russian-style patronymics and surnames to newborn Tajik children, with children from minority and mixed families retaining the right to their traditional surnames.

== Political positions ==
Emomali Rahom is ideological committed to secular nationalism.

== Electoral history ==
Electoral history of Emomali Rahmon
Year	Office	Party	Votes received				Result
Year	Office	Party	Total	%	P.	Swing	Result
1994	President of Tajikistan	IND	1,434,437	—N/a	1st	—N/a	Won
1999	President of Tajikistan	PDP	2,749,908	97.62%	1st	—N/a	Won
2006	President of Tajikistan	PDP	2,419,192	80.34%	1st	-17.28	Won
2013	President of Tajikistan	PDP	3,023,754	83.92%	1st	+3.58	Won
2020	President of Tajikistan	PDP	3,853,987	92.08%	1st	+8.16	Won

== Honours and awards ==
- Honorary Doctorate of Leadership by the Limkokwing University of Creative Technology (LUCT)
- Hero of Tajikistan
- (Kuwait) Order of Mubarak the Great
- (Ukraine) Order of Prince Yaroslav the Wise (2008)
- (Latvia) Order of the Three Stars (2009)
- Order of Merit of Ukraine (2011)
- (Azerbaijan) Heydar Aliyev Order (2012)
- Order of the President of Turkmenistan (2012)
- Order of the Republic of Serbia (2013)
- (Russia) Order of Alexander Nevsky (2017)
- (Kazakhstan) Order of Parasat (2018)
- Mark of Honour of Heads of State in Central Asia (2021)
- (Russia) Order "For Merit to the Fatherland" (2022)
- Honorary Doctorate in Arts by Cairo University (2022)
- (Kazakhstan) Order of the Golden Eagle (2023)
- (China) Friendship Medal (2024)

== Notes ==
Political offices
Preceded by Akbarsho Iskandrov	Chairman of the Supreme Soviet of Tajikistan; 1992–1994	Office abolished
Preceded by Rahmon Nabiyev	President of Tajikistan; 1994–present	Incumbent
Party political offices
New political party	Leader of People's Democratic Party; 1994–present	Incumbent
