= Izatullo Khayoyev =

First Vice President of Tajikistan

- Иззатулло Ҳаёев
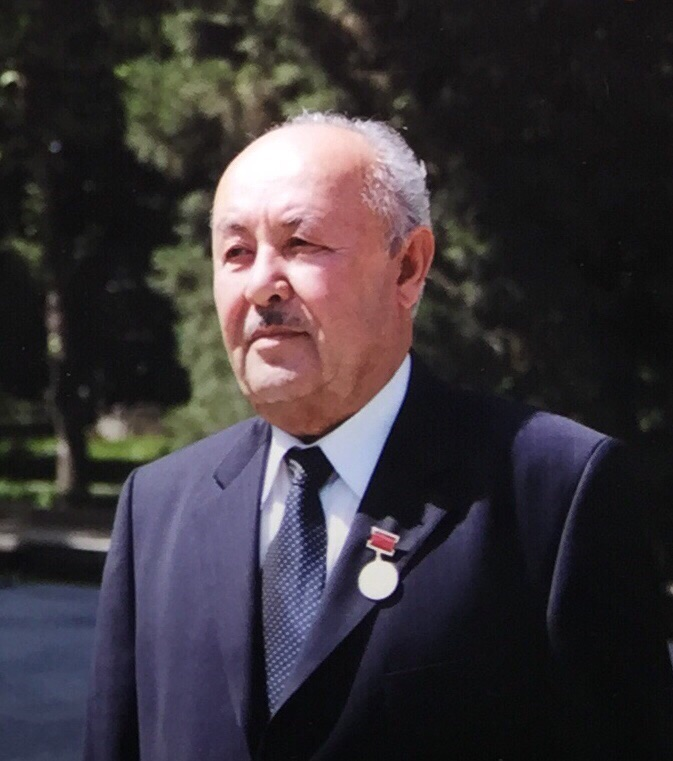
- Khayoyev in 2010

1st Vice President of Tajikistan
- In office December 1990 – 25 June 1991
- President: Qahhor Mahkamov
- Preceded by: Office established
- Succeeded by: Narzullo Dustov

1st Prime Minister of Tajikistan
- In office 25 June 1991 – 9 January 1992
- Preceded by: Himself (as Chairman of the Council of Ministers)
- Succeeded by: Akbar Mirzoyev

Chairman of the Council of Ministers of the Tajik SSR
- In office 26 January 1986 – 6 December 1990
- Preceded by: Qahhor Mahkamov
- Succeeded by: Himself (as Prime Minister)

Personal details
- Born: 22 June 1936 Khojaiskhok, Kulob District, Tajik SSR, Soviet Union
- Died: 25 April 2015 (aged 78) Dushanbe, Tajikistan

Izatullo Khayoyevich Khayoyev (Tajik: Иззатулло Ҳаёев, Izzatullo Hayoyev; Russian: Изатулло Хаёевич Хаёев, 22 June 1936 – 25 April 2015) was the first Vice President of Tajikistan from December 1990 to 25 June 1991 and the first Prime Minister of Tajikistan from 25 June 1991 to 9 January 1992. Previously he served as Chairmen of the Council of Ministers of the Tajik SSR from 1986 to 1990.

== Death ==
He died on 25 April 2015, aged 78, likely due to experienced with health problems few years earlier. President Emomali Rahmon expressed condolences to his friends and family members.

Political offices
Preceded by Position established	Prime Minister of Tajikistan; 1991–1992	Succeeded by Akbar Mirzoyev
