= Rahmon Nabiyev =

Leader of Tajikistan (1982–1985, 1991–1992)

- Раҳмон Набиев
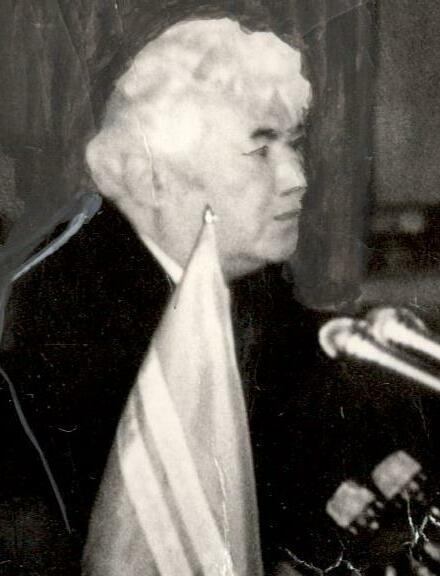
- Nabiyev in 1991

2nd President of Tajikistan
- In office 2 December 1991 – 7 September 1992
- Prime Minister: Izatullo Khayoyev; Akbar Mirzoyev
- Vice President: Narzullo Dustov (1991–1992); Vacant (May–Nov 1992)
- Preceded by: Akbarsho Iskandarov (acting)
- Succeeded by: Akbarsho Iskandarov (acting); Emomali Rahmon
- In office 23 September 1991 – 6 October 1991
- Prime Minister: Izatullo Khayoyev
- Preceded by: Qahhor Mahkamov; Qadriddin Aslonov (acting)
- Succeeded by: Akbarsho Iskandarov (acting)

2nd Chairman of the Supreme Soviet of Tajikistan
- In office 23 September 1991 – 6 October 1991
- Preceded by: Qadriddin Aslonov
- Succeeded by: Akbarsho Iskandarov
Tajik SSR posts
First Secretary of the Communist Party of Tajikistan
In office 20 April 1982 – 14 December 1985
Preceded by	Dzhabar Rasulov
Succeeded by	Qahhor Mahkamov
5th Chairman of the Council of Ministers of the Tajik SSR
In office 24 July 1973 – 20 April 1982
Leader	Dzhabar Rasulov
Preceded by	Abdulakhad Kakharov
Succeeded by	Qahhor Mahkamov

Personal details
- Born: Rahmon Nabiyevich Nabiyev; 5 October 1930 Khujand, Tajik SSR, Soviet Union
- Died: 11 April 1993 (aged 62) Khujand, Tajikistan
- Party: CPT
- Spouse: Mariam Nabieva
- Children: 3
- Education: Agricultural University of Tajikistan

Rahmon Nabiyevich Nabiyev (Note: Tajik: Раҳмон Набиевич Набиев; Russian: Рахмон Набиевич Набиев) (5 October 1930 – 11 April 1993) was a Tajik politician and engineer who served as the second president of Tajikistan from 1991 until his resignation in 1992. Having previously served in this role briefly for 13 days from September to October 1991, Nabiyev was the shortest-serving president in Tajikistan's history and was also the first directly elected Tajik president.

Born into a family of farmers in Khujand, Nabiyev started working as an accountant on a collective farm at the age of 16 in 1946. In the same year he entered the Leninabad Agricultural College (now Agricultural University of Tajikistan) and graduated in 1949. In 1954, he began to work for two years as the chief engineer of the machine-tractor station in Isfisor. In 1961, Nabiyev joined politics and became the Minister of Agriculture in 1971, serving in this role until in 1973 where he became the Chairman of the Council of Ministers (head of government). Aged 43 upon assuming office, Nabiyev was the youngest Tajik head of government ever.

In 1982, Nabiyev became the first secretary of the Communist Party of Tajikistan (CPT) and thus the de facto leader of the country, having served in this role until in 1985 where he was ousted in a corruption scandal. In September 1991 shortly after independence, Nabiyev became the Chairman of the Supreme Soviet of Tajikistan and thus the president. However, he stepped down 13 days later in early October following intense pressure to do so. Nabiyev participated in the subsequent presidential elections held the following month and was elected president despite accusations of fraud by opponents and was eventually sworn in as president for a second time on 2 December.

Nabiyev's presidency was marked by intense political instability, economic hardship, and discontent against his rule. In March 1992, a group of protests were formed against Nabiyev and his government which started the Tajik Revolution, demanding democratic reforms. However, the protesters were suppressed and thus the protests escalated into a civil war on 5 May. Four months later, Nabiyev was detained by opposition forces and held at gunpoint where he was forced to resign under pressure and did so at Dushanbe Airport. His resignation was officially accepted on 19 November during the 16th session of the Tajik Supreme Soviet which abolished the presidency.

On 11 April 1993, Nabiyev died under mysterious circumstances. While the official cause of death was a heart attack, there were other rumours stating that Nabiyev was either murdered or committed suicide. His family however, denied that Nabiyev died of a heart attack stating that he had no heart problems and instead believed that he was killed by pro-government forces. While Nabiyev's legacy is often overshadowed by Emomali Rahmon, his successor and the current president of Tajikistan, Nabiyev was remembered for playing a major role in the early history of Tajikistan while criticised for starting a civil war which killed up to 150,000 people.

== Early years ==
Nabiyev was born on 5 October 1930 in an ethnic Tajik family of ordinary farmers, in the Khojent District (now the Ghafurov District) of the Leninabad Oblast. Starting in high school, in 1946, at the age of 16, he began to work as an accountant on a collective farm. In the same year he entered the Leninabad Agricultural College, which he graduated in 1949 to continue his studies in Tashkent, entering the Tashkent Institute of Irrigation and Agricultural Mechanization Engineers. After graduating from this university in 1954, he began to work for two years as the chief engineer of the machine-tractor station in Isfisor.

== Political activity ==
In 1961, Nabiyev joined the Communist Party of the Tajik SSR (the republican branch of the CPSU) and began working as a department head. From 1971 to 1973, he was the Minister of Agriculture of the Tajik SSR and in 1973, he became the Chairman of the Council of Ministers of the Tajik SSR, becoming de facto head of government. In 1982, Nabiyev was appointed the First Secretary of the Communist Party of Tajikistan, becoming the head of the republic. In 1985 he was dismissed from his post “for addiction to revelry and alcohol”. From 1986 to 1991, he was the Chairman of the Presidium of the Central Council of the Nature Conservation Society of the Tajik SSR. In 1990, he was elected a deputy of the Supreme Soviet of the Tajik SSR, and on 23 September 1991 he became its chairman.

== Leader of Tajikistan ==
=== Foreign affairs ===
On 21 December 1991, Nabiyev in Alma-Ata, together with the heads of some other former Soviet republics, signed the Alma-Ata Protocol on the establishment of the Commonwealth of Independent States. On 2 March 1992, he attended the raising of the flag of Tajikistan near the UN headquarters in New York. On 15 May of that year, he signed the Collective Security Treaty (CST) in Tashkent. Despite pressure from the political opposition, the Russian 201st Military Base at his insistence did not leave Tajikistan. He would later demand that the divisional command staff and junior staff be citizens of the republic. Nabiyev was seen as being pro-Russian and pro-Uzbek position, which saw him see support from Russia's Boris Yeltsin, Uzbekistan's Islam Karimov, and Kazakhstan's Nursultan Nazarbayev respectively.

=== Presidential turmoil ===
Disputes concerning the election led to opposition street demonstrations, which developed into a civil war in May 1992. On 7 September 1992, Nabiyev and an entourage of his were on their way to Dushanbe airport when they were ambushed by opposition forces. At the terminal, Nabiyev was forced to resign at gunpoint. After a meeting and discussions with the armed opposition in the airport's VIP lounge, Nabiyev was released.

By December 1992 the Kulyab province's former apparatchik turned paramilitary-leader, Emomali Rahmon, was in power.

== Death ==
Nabiyev died on 11 April 1993. The cause of his death is not clear. Officially, he died of a heart attack, but in other versions of the story, he shot himself or was killed. His family, including his daughter Munavvara Nabiyeva, have cast doubt on the official version of his death.

Nabiyev was buried in Khujand, where a state funeral was organized. The funeral commission was headed by Prime Minister Abdumalik Abdullajanov and was attended by almost all members of the leadership and government of the republic, including the chairman Emomali Rakhmonov, as well as foreign guests and ambassadors of foreign states.

In his memory, streets, schools and some other state institutions and objects are named after him throughout Tajikistan.

== Personal life ==
Nabiyev's widow, former First Lady Mariam Nabieva, died in a house fire in December 2017. Rahmon and Mariam had three children: two sons, Rashid and Rustam, as well as a daughter, Munavvara. The eldest son, Rashid, died in 1997 under unclear circumstances. The youngest son Rustam lives in Saint Petersburg and deals with business. Munavvara lives in Dushanbe.

Nabiyev loved football, and was a fan of the CSKA Pamir Dushanbe. In addition to his native Tajik, Nabiyev was also fluent in Russian and Uzbek, and also understood and spoke Persian and Dari. Nabiyev was also interested in Persian and Russian literature.

== Awards ==
- Three Orders of the Red Banner of Labour
- Order of the October Revolution
- Order of Lenin

== See also ==
- Khujand clan
- List of presidents of Tajikistan
- First Secretary of the Communist Party of Tajikistan

== Notes ==
Preceded by Qadriddin Aslonov; Akbarsho Iskandrov	President of Tajikistan; 1991; 1991–1992	Succeeded by Akbarsho Iskandrov
Preceded by Dzhabar Rasulov	First Secretary of the Communist Party of Tajikistan; 1983–1985	Succeeded by Qahhor Mahkamov
