= Akbarsho Iskandarov =

Acting President of Tajikistan in 1991 and 1992

- Акбаршоҳ Искандаров

Acting President of Tajikistan
- In office 7 September 1992 – 20 November 1992
- Prime Minister: Akbar Mirzoyev; Abdumalik Abdullajanov
- Preceded by: Rahmon Nabiyev
- Succeeded by: Office abolished; Emomali Rahmon (1994)
- In office 6 October 1991 – 2 December 1991
- Prime Minister: Izatullo Khayoyev
- Preceded by: Rahmon Nabiyev
- Succeeded by: Rahmon Nabiyev

Personal details
- Born: 1 August 1951 (age 75) Tajik SSR, Soviet Union
- Party: CPSU (CPT)

Akbarsho Iskandarov (Note: Russian: Акбаршо Искандаров; Tajik: Акбаршоҳ Искандаров, romanized: Akbarshoh Iskandarov) (born 1 August 1951) is a Tajikistani politician who was twice acting president of Tajikistan. He first served as acting president from October 6, 1991, to December 2, 1991, when Rahmon Nabiyev stepped down to fight Tajikistan's first presidential election. Nabiyev won the election and took over as the first popularly elected president in the country's history, but resigned in September 1992, following a coup d'état. Iskandrov again took the interim presidency and later resigned on 20 November 1992, after which the office of president was abolished and Emomali Rahmon was installed as head of state.

Iskandrov also served as ambassador to Turkmenistan, Kazakhstan and Mongolia.

On 13 June 2024, Iskandrov was among 50 people who were arrested on an alleged coup plot against the government and brought in for questioning. Prosecutors subsequently asked for a 23-year jail sentence for Iskandrov.

== Notes ==
Preceded by Rahmon Nabiyev	Acting President of Tajikistan - First Term; 6 October 1991 - 2 December 1991	Succeeded by Rahmon Nabiyev

Preceded by Rahmon Nabiyev	Acting President of Tajikistan - Second Term; 7 September 1992 – 20 November 1992	Succeeded by Presidency abolished
