= Qadriddin Aslonov =

Tajik politician and President (1991-1991)

- Қадриддин Аслонов

Acting President of Tajikistan
- In office TaSSR: 31 August 1991 – 9 September 1991; Independent Tajikistan: 9 September 1991 – 23 September 1991
- Preceded by: Qahhor Mahkamov
- Succeeded by: Rahmon Nabiyev

Personal details
- Born: 29 May 1947
- Died: November 1992 (aged 45)
- Party: CPSU (CPT)

Qadriddin Aslonov (Tajik: Қадриддин Аслонов, also spelled Kadriddin Aslonov; 29 May 1947 – November 1992) was acting President of Tajikistan from 31 August to 23 September 1991.

Aslonov was born on 29 May 1947 in Rasht District, Tajik SSR.

When his predecessor Qahhor Mahkamov resigned as the President of Tajikistan, Aslonov was elected his temporary successor in the capacity as Chairman of the Supreme Soviet. One of Aslonov's first actions as leader was to sign an edict calling for the cessation of all activities of the Communist Party on the territory of Tajikistan and the nationalization of the party's property. The Congress of the Communist Party of Tajikistan subsequently convened in the second half of September 1991 to announce the dissolution of the Communist Party of the Soviet Union. He also signed a decree which established 9 September as Independence Day. On September 20, 1991, Aslonov resigned from the Tajik Communist Party as well as from its Politburo. On September 23, conservative forces in the Tajik government ousted Aslonov. First Party Secretary Rahmon Nabiyev was installed as president, and a state of emergency was declared the same day. A year later, during the initial stages of the civil war that engulfed the country after the collapse of the Soviet Union, Aslonov was reported missing in November 1992. According to a source, he was killed by militants of the pro-government Popular Front.
