= Qahhor Mahkamov =

Tajik politician

- Қаҳҳор Маҳкамов
- Mahkamov in 1991

1st President of Tajikistan
- In office 30 November 1990 – 31 August 1991
- Vice President: Izatullo Khayoyev
- Preceded by: Office Established
- Succeeded by: Qadriddin Aslonov (Acting); Rahmon Nabiyev

First Secretary of the Communist Party of Tajikistan
- In office 14 December 1985 – 31 August 1991
- Preceded by: Rahmon Nabiyev
- Succeeded by: Position abolished

Full member of the 28th Politburo
- In office 14 July 1990 – 29 August 1991

Member of the National Assembly of Tajikistan
- In office 2000–2016
- Appointed by: Emomali Rahmon

Personal details
- Born: 16 April 1932 Khujand, Tajik SSR, Soviet Union
- Died: 8 June 2016 (aged 84) Dushanbe, Tajikistan
- Party: Communist Party of Tajikistan
- Other political affiliations: Communist Party of the Soviet Union
- Spouse: Gavkhar Shakirovna Makhkamova
- Children: 3
- Education: Leningrad Mining Institute

Qahhor Mahkamov (Russian: Кахар Махкамович Махкамов, romanized: Kakhar Makhkamovich Makhkamov, Tajik: Қаҳҳор Маҳкамов; alternative spelling Kahar Mahkamov; 16 April 1932 – 8 June 2016) was a Tajik politician who served as First Secretary of the Communist Party of Tajikistan from 1985 to 1991 and was the first President of Tajikistan from November 1990 until his fall in the August 1991 coup.

== Early life and career ==
Mahkamov was born into a working-class family in the northern city of Khujand on 16 April 1932. He graduated from Dushanbe Industrial Technicom in 1949 and from the Leningrad Mining Institute in 1952 with a degree in engineering. He worked as a professor, head engineer, and director of a mine in Isfara. In 1957 he became a member of the Communist Party of the Soviet Union and quickly worked his way into the high ranks of the Communist Party of Tajikistan, becoming head of the prestigious Committee of the Representatives of the Workers of Leninabad. In 1963, Mahkamov was appointed to the Central Committee of the Communist Party of Tajikistan and from 1963 until 1982 he was Head of the Central Planning and the Vice-Chairman of the Council of Ministers of Soviet Tajikistan, one of the most powerful positions in the republic. From 26 April 1982 – 26 January 1986, he was Chairman of the Council of Ministers of the Tajik SSR.

== Leader of Tajikistan ==
=== First Secretary ===
In 1985, Rahmon Nabiyev was ousted in a corruption scandal as First Secretary of the Communist Party of Tajikistan and Mahkamov was chosen to succeed him. Mahkamov's tenure was one of the most turbulent in the republic's history. His accession to power coincided with that of Mikhail Gorbachev and the advent of Perestroika and Glasnost. During Mahkamov's reign in power Tajikistan saw a surge in nationalism, which culminated in the passage of the 1989 ‘’Language Law’’ that designated Tajik the state language of the republic. This law elicited a great deal of fear among the population and an exodus of the non-Central Asian population began, especially amongst ethnic Russians, Jews and Germans.

The greatest threat to Mahkamov's power came during the February 1990 Dushanbe riots that rocked the capital. Tajik youths clashed with non-Tajiks and battles were fought in the streets of Dushanbe between rioters and police and soldiers, resulting in dozens of deaths. Mahkamov oversaw a crackdown on Islamic fundamentalists and a lengthy curfew was put in place.

=== Presidency ===
He served as Chairman of the Presidium of the Supreme Soviet (head of state) from 12 April to 30 November 1990. As part of the political reforms that Gorbachev was instituting the Supreme Soviet of Tajikistan appointed Mahkamov the first President of Tajikistan on 30 November 1990. Mahkamov's fall from power came in August 1991 when he supported the failed August Coup by hardliners in Moscow. Protestors took to the streets and demanded Mahkamov's ouster from power and on August 31, 1991 he resigned his positions as President and First Secretary.

== Post-presidency ==
Mahkamov then retired from politics and sat on the sidelines during the ensuing political instability and Civil War in Tajikistan. After his resignation, he retired and was given a pension of 1,000 Soviet rubles. According to him, by 1993-1994 he actually lost his pension. At this time, he worked as an assistant and adviser to an entrepreneur.

In 2000, Mahkamov was appointed a member of the National Assembly of Tajikistan by the order of the President Emomali Rahmon. As the oldest member of the assembly, he often opened and managed the first session until a chairman was elected, serving as the de facto "Father of the House".

=== Death ===
He died on 8 June 2016 at the age of 84, after suffering a long illness. Rahmon send a telegram of condolences to his family, saying he will "forever remain in the memory of the people of Tajikistan as a modest person, a qualified specialist and a caring leader.” The funeral took place the following day, at the Khoja Yakub Central Cathedral Mosque of Dushanbe. The Janaza was personally conducted by the Supreme Mufti of Tajikistan Saidmukarram Abdulkodirzoda. The funeral was attended by several thousand people, among whom were many current and former officials. He was buried at Sari Osiyo Cemerery.

== Personal life ==
His wife Gavkhar Shakirovna Makhkamova (1934–2013) was a Tatar from Kyrgyzstan, serving as a mining specialist. They met in Shurab in 1949 and were married for 63 years. They had three children: Amir, Rinat and Rano. Amir is a civil engineer living in the United States, Rinat works in St. Petersburg and Rano is a graduate from the Moscow Conservatory.

== Awards ==
- Four Orders of the Red Banner of Labor
- Honored Engineer of Tajikistan.

Party political offices
Preceded by Rahmon Nabiyev	First Secretary of the Communist Party of Tajikistan; 1985 – 31 August 1991	Succeeded by Position Abolished
Political offices
Preceded by Office Established	President of Tajikistan; 30 November 1990 – 31 August 1991	Succeeded by Qadriddin Aslonov
