= 1991 Tajik presidential election =

- 24 November 1991
- Registered: 2,610,089
- Turnout: 86.49%
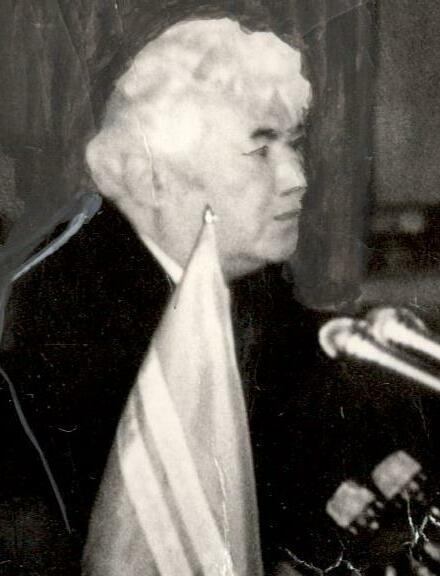

Nominee	Rahmon Nabiyev	Davlat Khudonazarov
Party	Communist	Democratic
Popular vote	1,321,189	678,461
Percentage	60.44%	31.04%
President before election
Rahmon Nabiyev
Communist
Elected President
Rahmon Nabiyev
Communist

Presidential elections were held for the first time in Tajikistan on 24 November 1991. The result was a victory for Rahmon Nabiyev of the Communist Party of Tajikistan, who received 60% of the vote. Voter turnout was 86.5%.

== Results ==
Candidate	Party	Votes	%
Rahmon Nabiyev	Communist Party of Tajikistan	1,321,189	60.44
Davlat Khudonazarov	Democratic Party	678,461	31.04
Saifuddin Turayev		101,146	4.63
Khikmatullo Nasriddinov		28,963	1.32
Burikhon Salimov		11,863	0.54
Bobisho Shoyev		8,273	0.38
Akbar Maksumov		5,140	0.24
Against all		30,974	1.42
Total		2,186,009	100.00
Valid votes		2,186,009	96.83
Invalid/blank votes		71,467	3.17
Total votes		2,257,476	100.00
Registered voters/turnout		2,610,089	86.49
Source: Ethnic Aspects of Power

== Aftermath ==
After the elections, protesters gathered to peacefully protest the results. However, angry protesters eventually turned to violence, causing them to clash with the military in Khujand. This sparked the five-year long Tajikistani Civil War. Nabiyev was ambushed and held at gunpoint while going to Dushanbe Airport, where he was forced to resign.
