= President of Tajikistan =

Head of state

President of the Republic of Tajikistan
- Президенти Тоҷикистон; Президент Таджикистана
- Presidential standard

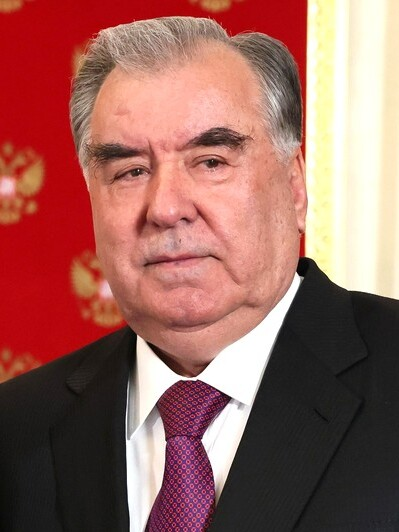
- Incumbent; Emomali Rahmon since 16 November 1994
- Executive Office of the President of Tajikistan
- Type: Head of state; Commander-in-chief
- Residence: Palace of the Nation, Dushanbe
- Appointer: Popular vote
- Term length: Seven years; renewable
- Constituting instrument: Constitution of Tajikistan (1994)
- Formation: 30 November 1990; 35 years ago
- First holder: Qahhor Mahkamov
- Succession: Chairman of the National Assembly
- Salary: 144,144 Tajikistani somoni/13,200 USD annually
- Website: https://president.tj/

The president of Tajikistan (Tajik: Президенти Тоҷикистон, romanized: Prezidenti Tojikiston, Russian: Президент Таджикистана, romanized: Prezident Tadzhikistana) is the head of state and de facto head of government (Note: Even though an executive president co-exists with a prime minister, multiple sources have still described Tajikistan as a presidential republic with the president serving as both head of state and head of government.) of the Republic of Tajikistan. The president heads the executive branch of the country's government and is the commander-in-chief of the Armed Forces of Tajikistan.

== History of the presidency ==
The first president of Tajikistan was Qahhor Mahkamov, who held the position of First Secretary of the Communist Party of Tajikistan and was appointed President of the Tajik Soviet Socialist Republic in November 1990. Mahkamov served both as First Secretary and President but was forced to resign in August 1991 due to the unpopularity of his support for the August Coup of 1991 in Moscow and the resulting street demonstrations in Dushanbe. From 1991 to 1992 the post of the president changed hands several times due to the political changes and uncertainty following the dissolution of the Soviet Union and ensuing social unrest and violence in the Tajikistani Civil War. Since 1994, Emomali Rahmon has held the position of the presidency. The presidential elections were last held in 2020. Presidential elections in Tajikistan have consistently been criticized by international observers as unfair and favoring the ruling party.

== Constitutional role ==
The president of Tajikistan is the head of the state and the highest ranking chief government official in the country. The president is elected by a national vote and was historically limited to one seven-year term which can only be renewed once, until the abolishment of term limits. The president is also the supreme commander-in-chief of the Tajik National Army. In addition to the executive office of the president, there is a Security Council that advises the president on matters of national security. As Supreme Commander-in-Chief, he also is entitled to use the Center for the Management of the Armed Forces (opened on National Army Day in 2018), which would serve as the main military command center for the president, similarly to the Russian Armed Forces National Defense Management Center.

=== Executive office ===
The office of the president consisting of 5 departments and 24 offices is the executive arm of the president, including, inter alia, the following are the most important ones:

- Department of the Constitutional Rights of Citizens
- Department of Public Affairs, Information and Cultural Affairs
- Department of Social Policy
- Department of Economic Policy

The president also has five state advisors who aide the president on policy issues:

- State Advisor on Economic Issues
- State Advisor on International Affairs
- State Advisor on Science and Social issues
- State Advisor on Public Affairs Information and Culture and State
- State Advisor on Defense and Law Enforcement

== Presidential standard ==
The standard of the president of the Republic of Tajikistan is the official symbol of the office of president in the country. It was made a legal state symbol in accordance with an amendment to Law No. 192 on July 28, 2006. It was introduced in time for the inauguration ceremony for Emomali Rahmon in his third term as head of state. The standard is a rectangular panel consisting of three horizontally arranged color bars which are similar to the colors on the Flag of Tajikistan. In it, there is a symbolic Derafsh Kaviani banner the center, with its upper part having spear, symbolizing the will and power of the authorities for the defense of the country. The banner is four-sided and has four branches inside (which represents the four regions of Tajikistan), while the center depicts a winged lion with a crown and seven stars, which are the basis of the emblem of Tajikistan. The Derafsh Kaviani is embroidered with two gold threads on both sides of the standard.

== Residence ==
Since 2008, the Palace of Nations (also called the Kohi Millat or the White House) has been the official residence of the president of Tajikistan. The president often receives foreign dignitaries and public official at the palace, as well as holds public events at its main hall. Its construction was dedicated to Tajik historic king Ismail Samani. It opened in August 2008, hosting an SCO summit in its first day. The palace is portrayed on the back of a 500 Somoni banknote.

Up until 2008, the presidential residence was located in a different location, in building that was built in 1957 (to commemorate the 40th anniversary of the October Revolution), and formerly served as the headquarters of the Central Committee of the Communist Party of Tajikistan. In the Soviet era, it had hosted dignitaries such as Raul Castro, Ho Chi Minh, Nikita Khrushchev, Leonid Brezhnev, and Boris Yeltsin. In 2017, the building became the temporary office of the Mayor of Dushanbe. It became the presidential residence in 1992. In February 2020, it was announced that the former palace would be demolished.

The president also has a country residence called Pugus in the Districts under Central Government Jurisdiction.

== Selection process ==
=== Elections ===
The president of Tajikistan is elected for a seven-year term (Exception for Founder of peace and national Unity — Leader of the Nation) using the two-round system; if no candidate receives over 50% of all votes cast, a second round is held between 15 and 31 days later between the two candidates who received the most votes. For the result to be validated, voter turnout must exceed 50%; if it falls below the threshold, fresh elections will be held.

=== Inauguration ceremony ===
The inauguration ceremony takes place at the Kokhi Somon Palace in Dushanbe. Following the ceremony, a military parade of the Armed Forces of the Republic of Tajikistan is held on Dousti Square. The minister of defence reads the oath of the allegiance to the Supreme Commander-in-Chief during the ceremony before the troops of the National Army march off. A 30-gun salute is fired to mark the occasion. The following years saw inauguration ceremonies held:

President	Date	
Rahmon Nabiyev	1994	
Emomali Rahmon	1999	The ceremony was attended by Russian Prime Minister Vladimir Putin.
Emomali Rahmon	18 November 2006	
Emomali Rahmon	30 October 2020	The ceremony was held amid the COVID-19 pandemic in Tajikistan.

== List of presidents of Tajikistan ==
No.	Portrait	Name (Born-Died)	Term			Political Party	Elected
No.	Portrait	Name (Born-Died)	Took office	Left office	Time in office	Political Party	Elected
President
1	Qahhor Mahkamov	Qahhor Mahkamov (1932–2016)	30 November 1990	31 August 1991	274 days	Communist	—
–	Qadriddin Aslonov	Qadriddin Aslonov (1947–1992); Acting	31 August 1991	23 September 1991	23 days	Communist	—
2	Rahmon Nabiyev	Rahmon Nabiyev (1930–1993)	23 September 1991	6 October 1991	13 days	Communist	—
–	Akbarsho Iskandarov	Akbarsho Iskandarov (born 1951); Acting	6 October 1991	2 December 1991	57 days	Communist	—
(2)	Rahmon Nabiyev	Rahmon Nabiyev (1930–1993)	2 December 1991	7 September 1992	280 days	Communist	1991
–	Akbarsho Iskandarov	Akbarsho Iskandarov (born 1951); Acting	7 September 1992	20 November 1992	13 days	Communist	—
Chairman of the Supreme Assembly
–	Emomali Rahmon	Emomali Rahmon (born 1952)	20 November 1992	16 November 1994	1 year, 361 days	Independent	—
President
3	Emomali Rahmon	Emomali Rahmon (born 1952)	16 November 1994	Incumbent	32 years, 0 days	PDP	1994; 1999; 2006; 2013; 2020

== See also ==
- List of leaders of Tajikistan
- Vice President of Tajikistan
- Prime Minister of Tajikistan
