= Rukhshona Khakimova =

Tajikistani journalist (born 1992)

- Рухшона Ҳакимова
- Born: 1992 (age 33–34); Tajikistan
- Occupation: Journalist
- Years active: 2013–present
- Known for: Investigative reporting in Tajikistan
- Criminal charges: Treason
- Criminal penalty: Eight years' imprisonment
- Criminal status: Imprisoned
- Children: 2

Rukhshona Khakimova (Tajik: Рухшона Ҳакимова; born c. 1992) is a Tajikistani journalist, known for her investigative reporting on corruption, transparency and disinformation in Tajikistan. In 2025, Khakimova was found guilty of treason and sentenced to eight years in prison, in a trial considered by national and international human rights groups to be unfair.

== Career ==
Khakimova has worked as an independent journalist since 2013, and is a member of the Centre for Investigative Journalism of Tajikistan and the National Association of Independent Mass Media in Tajikistan. Her initial work focused on the rights of children, women and detainees; religious freedom; the use of torture; and healthcare and education issues. Khakimova went on to work as a fact checker for Factcheck.tj and the Institute for War and Peace Reporting's Central Asia project, focusing on corruption, international transparency and disinformation.

In 2023, Khakimova placed third at the Jumaboy Tolibov Prize for Journalistic Investigations. Her winning article, published by Factcheck.tj, focused on the discrepancy between the figures shared by the governments of Tajikistan and China on trade between the two countries.

== Arrest and imprisonment ==
On 16 July 2024, Khakimova was detained outside her home in Dushanbe by four police officers, and subsequently held for 12 hours by the Dushanbe Department of Internal Affairs; she was not arrested but was officially treated as a "witness" of an unspecified case. During Khakimova's detention, her home was searched and items seized, including a laptop, phone, voice recorder, and her passport, allegedly without a search warrant. She was detained for a second time later that month, also as a witness. Later that month, Khakimova was charged with an unidentified offence which was not shared with her or her lawyer; they were also denied access to the evidence being used against her. Due to her having two young children, Khakimova was placed under house arrest to enable her to continue caring for them while the investigation was ongoing.

At an initial court hearing in November 2024, it was announced that Khakimova was being charged with treason under article 305 part 2 (d) of the Tajikistan's criminal code. This was in relation to a larger investigation of government politicians and officials, including Khakimova's uncle, Shokirjon Khakimov, the deputy head of the Social Democratic Party, and Saidjafar Usmonzod, a member of the Assembly of Representatives, who had been charged with extremism, espionage, and of attempting to organise a coup d'état. The primary evidence against Khakimova was interviews she had completed with around 30 respondents for the Kyrgyzstan-based research agency Central Asia Barometer, looking at international aid received by Tajikistan from China. The CAB had used the same questionnaire to look at Chinese aid received by other Central Asian countries which had not led to any legal ramifications or consequences. At the hearing, the case was classified as secret. The prosecution also stated its intention to seek a 17-year prison sentence for Khakimova.

On 5 February 2025, the Supreme Court of Tajikistan convicted Khakimova of treason and sentenced her to eight years in prison. It also ordered the full seizure of her property, including her bank account containing 230, 000 TJS. Khakimova was immediately detained in a pre-trial detention centre in Dushanbe. Khakimova appealed the sentence, but on 2 April 2025 the Supreme Court upheld the ruling. Later that month, she was transferred to a prison in Norak.

== Response ==
Following news of the charges against Khakimova, the New York City-based human rights group Human Rights Watch called on Tajikistani authorities to drop the charges against her. Her conviction was criticised by human rights and journalism groups in Tajikistan and internationally. The National Association of Independent Media of Tajikistan stated that the secrecy of Khakimova's trial had meant it was impossible to confirm if the proceedings had been fair; Reporters Without Borders described the trial as being "marred by irregularities" and "unfair". The Committee to Protect Journalists stated that the charges against Khakimova were in response to her reporting on China; her uncle's prominence as an opposition politicians; and a wider crackdown on independent journalism in Tajikistan.

In March 2025, a petition signed by 130 Tajikistani women called on Emomali Rahmon, the President of Tajikistan, to commute Khakimova's sentence. In May, Mary Lawlor, the United Nations special rapporteur on the situation of human rights defenders expressed her "serious concern" at Khakimova's conviction, calling on the Tajikistani government to "immediately" release Khakimova and grant her a fair trial in line with international standards. Lawlor suggested Khakimova's ongoing detention, as well as her detentions in July 2024, were arbitrary.
