= Ministry of Culture of Tajikistan =

Ministry of Culture
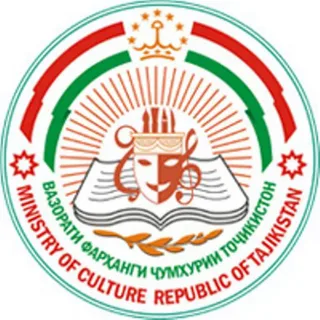
- The ministry's logo

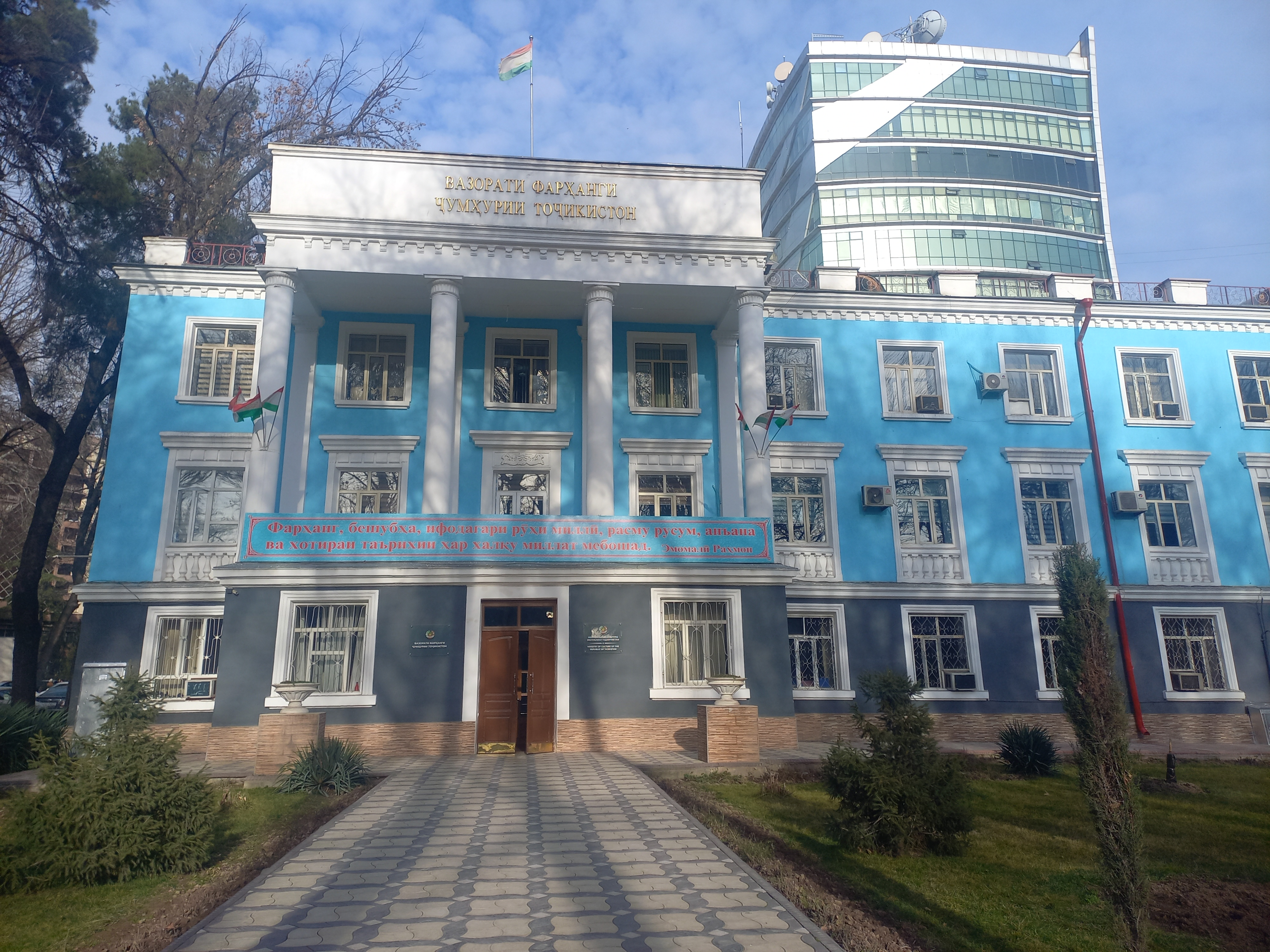
- Ministry building.

Agency overview
- Formed: 25 April 1953; 73 years ago
- Jurisdiction: Government of Tajikistan
- Headquarters: Dushanbe, Tajikistan
- Minister responsible: Matlubakhon Sattoriyon
- Website: vfarhang.tj

The Ministry of Culture of the Republic of Tajikistan (Tajik: Вазорати фарҳанги Ҷумҳурии Тоҷикистон) is a ministry of the Government of Tajikistan responsible for the development and implementation of state policy on culture, art, publishing, and copyright. The head of the ministry is the Minister of Culture, appointed by decree of the President of Tajikistan.

The current Minister of Culture since January 29, 2024 is Matlubakhon Sattoriyon.

== History ==
In May 1938, the House of People's Creativity was established in Tajikistan, which was responsible for the management of cultural institutions, theaters, cultural and recreational parks, red teahouses, libraries, and provided methodological advice. With the increase in cultural and recreational institutions, the demand for their management and leadership increased. In 1944, the Council of People's Commissars under the Government of the Tajik Soviet Socialist Republic, the Department of Arts was established, headed by the poet Mirzo Tursunzoda. On April 25, 1953, the Ministry of Culture of the Tajik SSR was established on the basis of the Department of Arts. In a short time, the structure of the ministry, its departments, departments, and sub-structures were organized and reorganized and began to operate. In 1995, as a result of the merger of the Ministry of Culture, Press and Information, the Committee for Television and Radio Broadcasting and Cinema Affairs, the Ministry of Culture and Information was established, which at the end of 1997 was renamed the Ministry of Culture.

== Ministry structure ==
- Leadership
- Art Department
- Department of Development of Cultural and Entertainment Institutions and Folk Crafts
- Department of Publishing and Press
- Department of Economic Analysis and Forecasting
- Accounting and Reporting Department
- Technical regulation department
- Department of Science and Educational Institutions
- International Relations Department
- Department of Law, Protection of Copyright and Related Rights
- Department of Preservation and Use of Historical and Cultural Heritage
- Personnel and Special Affairs Department
- Department of Works Management and Control
- Internal Audit Department

== Subordinate institutions ==
- Ayni Opera and Ballet Theatre
- State Academic Drama Theater named after Abulkasim Lohuti
- Tajik State Youth Theater named after Mahmudjon Vohidov
- State Republican Puppet Theater
- Mayakovsky Theatre
- Saidali Valizoda Musical and Comedy Theater of Kulob
- Ato Muhammadjonov Musical and Comedy Theater of Bokhtar city
- Dangara District Republican Music and Drama Theater
- Tajik State Circus
- Tajik State Institute of Culture and Arts named after Mirzo Tursunzoda
- Tajik State Institute of Fine Arts and Design
- Tajik National Conservatory named after Talabkhuja Sattorov
- Dushanbe College of Arts named after Ahmad Bobokulov
- Republican College of Culture named after Partov Boydakov
- Republican College of Art named after Mirzorahmat Olimov
- Republican Choreographic College named after Malika Sobirova
- Karomatullo Kurbonov College of Arts, Kulob
- Sodirkhan Hafiz College of Arts
- Ziyodullo Shahidi Republican Secondary Specialized Music Boarding School
- Miratullo Atoev Republican Secondary Specialized Art Boarding School
- Scientific Research Institute of Culture and Information
- Tajik State Philharmonic named after Akasharif Juraev
- Tajik State Children's Philharmonic
- Republican State Children's Library named after Mirsaid Mirshakar
- State Union of Creative and Concert Groups
- National Agency for International Book Numbering Standard - Book House of Tajikistan
- Scientific Editorial Board of the Tajik National Encyclopedia
- "Firuza" magazine
- "Istiqbol" magazine
- "Bahori Ajam" newspaper
- "Irfan" Publishing House
- "Adib" Publishing House
- "Science and Life" magazine
- "Khorpustak" magazine
- "Chashma" magazine
- "Ilhom" Creative Center
- "Somon" Song and Dance Ensemble
- Ensemble "Lola"
- "Bazmoro" Art Institution
- Ziyodullo Shahidi Republican Museum of Musical Culture
- Rudaki Republican Museum of Regional History, Panjakent
- Dangara Republican Museum-Reserve
- Mir Sayid Ali Hamadoni District Historical and Ethnographic Museum
- Hulbuk Historical and Cultural Reserve
- Hissar Historical and Cultural Reserve
- Republican Society of Museums of Kulob
- State Unitary Enterprise "Repair and Construction"
- "Farhang" Hotel
- State Unitary Scientific and Production Enterprise "Soztarosh"
- "Sharifabad" recreation area
- State Unitary Enterprise "Administrative Building Services".

== Ministers ==
- Musa Rajabov (1953-1955)
- Qosim Hakimzoda (1955-1958)
- Alikul Imomov (1958-1961)
- Mirzo Rahmatov (1961-1966)
- Mehrubon Nazarov (1966-1979)
- Sultan Mirzoshoev (1979-1987)
- Nur Tabar (1987-1990)
- Tamara Abdushukurova (1990-1992)
- Ata Hamdam (1992-1995)
- Bobokhon Mahmadov (1995-2001)
- Abdurahim Rakhimov (2001)
- Karomatullo Olimov (2001-2004)
- Rajabmad Amirov (2004-2006)
- Mirzoshokhrukh Asrori (2006‒2013)
- Shamsiddin Orumbekzoda (2013-2020)
- Zulfiya Davlatzoda (2020-2024)
- Matlubakhon Sattoriyon (since January 29, 2024)
