= Deputy Prime Minister of Tajikistan =

A Deputy Prime Minister of Tajikistan (Tajik: Муовини Сарвазири Ҷумҳурии Тоҷикистон) is a member of the Government of Tajikistan. According to the Chapter 5, Article 73 of the Constitution of Tajikistan, "Article 73. The Government of the republic shall consist of the Prime Minister, his first Deputy, Deputies, Ministers, and Chairmen of state committees." The role of deputy prime minister is to coordinate the activities of federal government bodies and carry out other tasks in response to particular issues or events. The most senior of them is the First Deputy Prime Minister of Tajikistan.

== Current deputy prime ministers ==
Photo	Incumbent
	Sulaimon Ziyozoda
	Dilrabo Mansuri Saidullo
	Usmonali Usmonzoda

== Complete list of deputy prime ministers ==
The following is a list of all individuals who have held the office of Deputy Prime Minister of Tajikistan since 1991:

Photo	Name	Term Start	Term End
	Georgy Koshlakov	1991	1991
	Jamshed Karimov	January 1991	July 1991
	Asadullo Gulomov	2003	December 1, 2006
	Khayrinisso Yusufi	2004	2008
	Murodali Alimardon	26 January 2008	1 April 2015
	Ruqiya Qurbonova	26 January 2008	November 23, 2013
	Azim Ibrohim	November 23, 2013	August 30, 2020
	Mahmadtohir Zokirzoda	March 30, 2016	January 21, 2020
	Matlubakhon Sattoriyon	November 3, 2020	January 29, 2024
	Sulaimon Ziyozoda	26 January 2022	Present
	Dilrabo Mansuri Saidullo	29 January 2024	Present
	Usmonali Usmonzoda	November 3, 2020	Present

== See also ==
- First Deputy Prime Minister of Tajikistan
