= Khosiat Boboeva =

Tajikistani historian of the Soviet era (1923)

- Хосият Қосимовна Бобоева
- Born: December 5, 1923 (age 102); Khujand, Turkestan ASSR
- Citizenship: Tajikistani
- Awards: Order of the Badge of Honour

Academic background
- Education: Moscow State University; Leninabad State Pedagogical Institute

Academic work
- Discipline: Historian
- Sub-discipline: History of the Soviet Union; Labor history
- Institutions: Tajik National University

Khosiat Qosimovna Boboeva (Tajik: Хосият Қосимовна Бобоева; born December 5, 1923) is a Tajikistani historian of the Soviet era.

Boboeva was born into the family of a merchants in Khujand, later called Leninabad, and in 1942, the same year in which she joined the Communist Party of the Soviet Union, she received her degree from the Faculty of Natural Sciences of the Leninabad State Pedagogical Institute (now Khujand State University). In that same year she moved to Dushanbe, then called Stalinabad, taking a position in the offices of the Communist Party. From 1947 to 1951 she undertook postgraduate studies at Moscow State University.

Upon her return to Tajikistan, she was appointed secretary of the Leninabad region's Party Committee in 1954. In 1956 she took a position as assistant professor at Tajik National University, being promoted in 1959 to head of the Department of the History of the Communist Party of the Soviet Union and Political Economy of the Tajikistan State Medical Institute. Receiving her doctorate in history in 1974, she became a professor in 1978. In her research Boboeva has concerned herself largely with the history of labor issues in the Tajik SSR; among her areas of focus were the formation of workers' organizations, their relationship with farmers, and the role played by the Communist Party in uniting the two groups. Her writings include The Union of Workers and Farmers of Tajikistan During the Socialist Era (Dushanbe, 1974) and People's Healthcare: A Major Part of the Program of the Communist Party (Dushanbe, 1984). She has remained active in educational matters in Sughd Region.

For her work, Boboeva was named a Distinguished Contributor to Tajik Education in 1963; other awards which she has received during her career include the Order of the Badge of Honour and the Order of the Presidium of the Supreme Soviet of Tajikistan.
