= Arbob Cultural Palace, Khujand =

Building in Tajikistan

Coordinates: 40.2691°N 69.6924°E

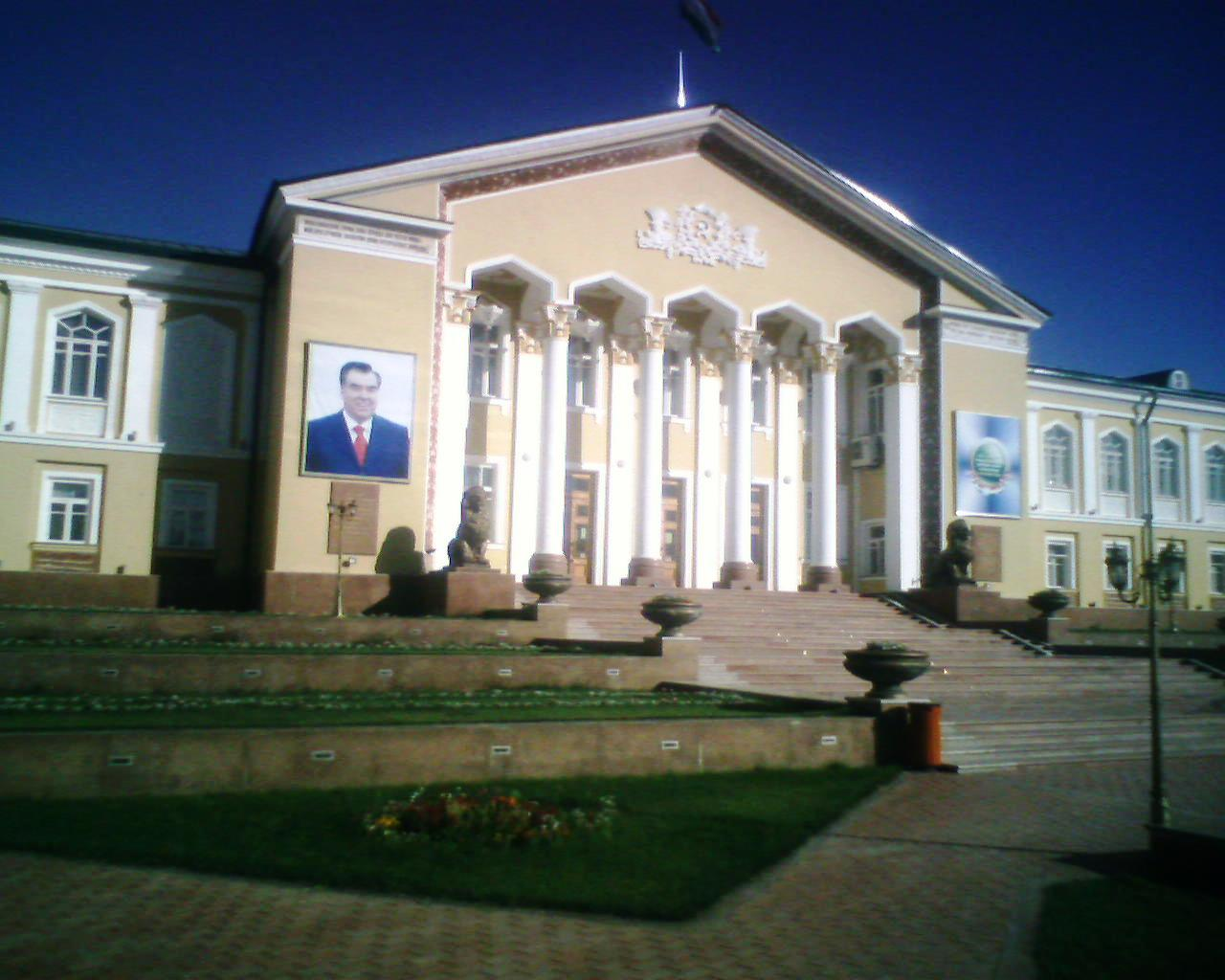
The main building of the Palace of Culture "Arbob"

The Arbob Cultural Palace (Tajik: Қасри фарҳанги Арбоб) is a building in Khujand, Tajikistan, the former headquarters of a Soviet collective farm, built in the 1950s and modelled on the winter gardens of Peterhof, St Petersburg.

== Building and location ==
The main building consists of three wings - with an ornate theatre seating 800 people in the main wing. The South wing currently houses a museum which tells the history of Arbob and of collectivisation and the USSR in Tajikistan.

Outside the building is a procession of fountains and rose gardens running to the arrival driveway and a bust of Lenin.

== History ==
The thratre in the Arbob Palace in Khujand 2026

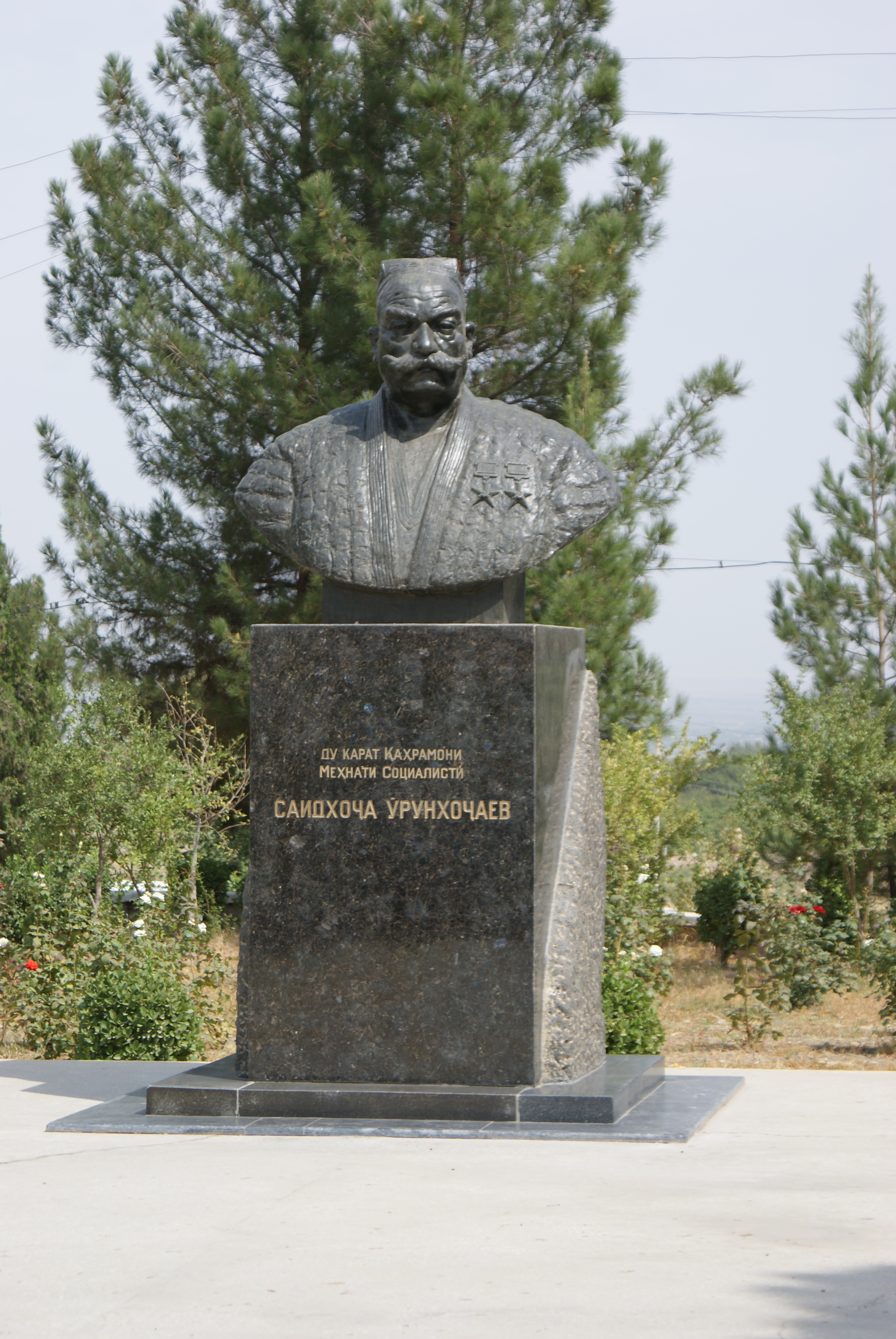
Urukhojaev's statue outside of Arbob palace.

The centre was built in the 1950s under the leadership of Urukhojaev, the head of the collective farm. Urukhojaev was a significant Tajik who sat on Soviet committees and was well known in the area around Khujand and in Tajikistan generally.

The building had particular significance in 1991, when it was the site for the meeting of the Tajik Soviet which officially declared independence from the Soviet Union. It was the site where the Tajik flag was chosen.

More recently, in the late 1990s it was also the site where peace conferences following the Tajik civil war were held. In particular, Tajik President Emomalii Rahmon first came to prominence speaking at the Palace, and it was the site for a "plov of peace" which celebrated successful negotiations towards an agreed end to the Tajik civil war.

The Palace was reconstructed, and the paintings and decorative stucco completely restored in 2012. At the foot of the palace, a magnificent park was laid out with an outdoor amphitheater with 7,000 seats built for celebrations, concerts and performances.

== Currency ==
The Arbob Cultural Palace features on the blue Tajik Somoni 5 dirham bank note (the reverse features the Shrine of Mirzo Tursunzoda).

== Recent events ==
On 16 November 2007, the Palace became the venue for ceremonies recognising the 15th anniversary of the 16th session of the Shuroi Oli (Supreme Council) of the 12th convocation, which was held in Sughd on 16 November 1992.

== Bibliography ==
- Tajikistan and the high pamirs, Robert Middleton, Huw Thomas, Monica Whitlock, Published by Oddessey Travel books
