= Ministry of Economic Development and Trade (Tajikistan) =

Ministry of Transport of Tajikistan
Agency overview
- Formed: 1925
- Jurisdiction: Government of Tajikistan
- Headquarters: 78 Rudaki Avenue, Dushanbe, Tajikistan
- Minister responsible: Abdurahmon Abdurahmonzoda

The Ministry of Economic Development and Trade (Tajik: Вазорати рушди иқтисод ва савдои Ҷумҳурии Тоҷикистон) is the central executive body of the Government of Tajikistan responsible for implementing state policy and regulation of the economy in Tajikistan.

== Etymology ==
The name of this institution in different years was:

- People's Commissariat of Internal Trade (1925-1927)
- People's Commissariat of Trade and Industry (1927-1930)
- People's Commissariat of Trade and Supply (1930-1934)
- People's Commissariat of Trade (1934-1946)
- Ministry of Trade (1946-1992)
- Ministry of Trade and Material Resources (1992-1994)
- State Committee for Contracts and Trade (1994-2001)
- Ministry of Economy and Foreign Economic Relations, and then the Ministry of Economy and Trade (2001-2006)
- Ministry of Economic Development and Trade (since 2007)

== Organization ==
=== Central Structure ===
- Management
- Main Department of Macroeconomic Analysis (General Economy)
- Economic Outlook and Reforms
- Main Department of Development of Real Sectors of the Economy
- Main Department of Market Analysis (Situation) and Regulation of Commercial Activities
- Main Department of Investment Policy Forecasting and Regulation of Regional Development
- Department of Foreign Economic Cooperation
- Department of Development of Social Sectors
- Department of Legal Support
- Secretariat Department
- Finance and Accounting Department
- Department of Personnel and Special Sector
- Department of Works

=== Institutions ===
- State Department "Sugdsavdo"
- State Institution Administration of Free Economic Zones "Panj"
- State Institution Administration of the Free Economic Zone "Sughd"
- State Institution Administration of the Dangara Free Economic Zone
- State Institution Administration of the Free Economic Zone "Ishkashim"
- National Patent and Information Center
- Tajikistan Trade Portal
- Economic Research Institute

== List of ministers ==
- N. Nabiev (1940–1943)
- Z. Salomatshoev (1943–1944)
- M. Qosimov (1945–1950)
- H. Sharifov (1950–1960)
- A. Kakhhorov (1956–1961)
- G. Tokhirov (1960–1961)
- M. Vaisov (1961–1963)
- Qahhor Mahkamov (1963–1982)
- G. Sattorov (1963–1972)
- D. Vohidov (1972–1974)
- R. Grishina (1974–1981)
- O. Kataev (1981–1991)
- B. Karimov (1989–1990)
- Georgy Koshlakov (1991–1992)
- T. Gaforov (1995–1998)
- Ismoil Davlatov (May–December 1992)
- H. Soliev (1991–2006)
- U. Davlat (1998–2000)
- Y. Azimov (2000–2001)
- G. Bobozoda (2006–2009)
- F. Hamraliev (2009–2012)
- Sharif Rahimzoda (2012–2015)
- Nematullo Hikmatullozoda (2015–2020)
- Zavqi Zavqizoda (2020–November 14, 2025)
- Abdurahmon Abdurahmonzoda (since November 14, 2025)

== See also ==
- Economy of Tajikistan
