= Government of Tajikistan =

Executive branch of national government

- Ҳукумати Ҷумҳурии Тоҷикистон
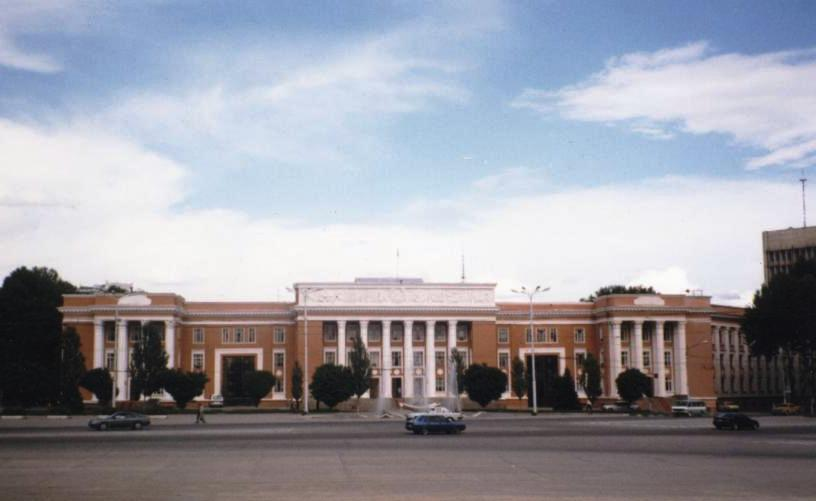
- Government headquarters in Dushanbe

Overview
- Established: July 1991
- State: Tajikistan
- Responsible to: President
- Annual budget: $6.3 billion USD (2026)
- Headquarters: Government House, Dushanbe
- Website: egov.tj

The Government of Tajikistan (Tajik: Ҳукумати Ҷумҳурии Тоҷикистон, romanized: Hukumati Çumhurii Toçikiston) is the chief executive body in Tajikistan. The government is formed by the Prime Minister of Tajikistan as the head of government on behalf of the President of Tajikistan. It was established in July 1991 as a reorganization of the Council of Ministers of the Tajik SSR. Its duties are defined in chapter 5 of the Constitution of Tajikistan. In accordance with Article 73 of the Constitution, the government consists of: the prime minister, his first deputy and deputies, ministers, and chairmen of state committees.

The cabinet is currently led by Prime Minister Kokhir Rasulzoda, who was appointed in 2013.

== History ==
The large body was preceded by the Council of Ministers of the Tajik Soviet Socialist Republic. After the fall of the USSR, the term "Council of Ministers" (Tajik: Шӯрои Вазирони Ҷумҳурии Тоҷикистон, romanized: Şūroi Vazironi Çumhurii Toçikiston) was used until 1994, when it was changed to "Government". Prior to the 2006 Tajik presidential election, the Government of Tajikistan, which executes the decisions of the president, included two deputy prime ministers, 19 ministers, nine committee heads, and several ex officio members. After the election, Rahmon abolished 10 ministries and five state committees and reappointed Oqil Oqilov as prime minister. Rahmon is said to have accumulated substantial informal power through patronage.

As a result of the 2013 administrative reform, the status and distribution of functions between ministries and agencies was clarified. Furthermore, the republic's executive bodies were divided into those under the president's jurisdiction (the so-called security agencies) and those under the government's jurisdiction.

== Current Government ==
Photo	Incumbent	Name
	Emomali Rahmon	President of Tajikistan
	Qohir Rasulzoda	Prime Minister of Tajikistan
	Hokim Kholiqzoda	First Deputy Prime Minister
	Sulaimon Ziyozoda	Deputy Prime Minister
	Dilrabo Mansuri Saidullo	Deputy Prime Minister
	Usmonali Usmonzoda	Deputy Prime Minister
	Kurban Hakimzoda	Minister of Agriculture
	Matlubakhon Sattoriyon	Minister of Culture
	Lieutenant General Emomali Sobirzoda	Minister of Defense
	Abdurahmon Abdurahmonzoda	Minister of Economic Development and Trade
	Rahim Hamro Saidzoda	Minister of Education & Science
	Daler Juma	Minister of Energy & Water Resources
	Fayziddin Qahhorda	Minister of Finance
	Sirojiddin Muhriddin	Minister of Foreign Affairs
	Jamoliddin Abdullozoda	Minister of Health and Social Protection
	Sherali Kabir	Minister of Industry and New Technologies
	Colonel General Ramazon Rahimov	Minister of Internal Affairs
	Muzaffar Ashuriyon	Minister of Justice
	Azim Ibrohim	Minister of Transport
	Gulnara Kenja Hasanzoda	Minister of Labor, Migration, and Public Employment
	Sulton Rahimzoda	Chairman of the State Committee for Investment and State Property Management
	Lieutenant General Saimumin Yatimov	Chairman of the State Committee for National Security
	Arif Ashuri Khojazoda	Chairman of the State Committee for Land Management and Geodesy
	Habibullo Vohidzoda	Prosecutor General
	Samad Safar	Director of the Drug Control Agency
	Firdavs Tolibzoda	Chairman of the National Bank of Tajikistan

=== Presidium ===
The Presidium of the Government is a 9-member committee from the cabinet that serves as the presiding body of the Government on a day-to-day basis.

Name	Incumbent
Prime Minister of Tajikistan	Qohir Rasulzoda
First Deputy Prime Minister	Hokim Kholiqzoda
Deputy Prime Minister	Sulaimon Ziyozoda
Deputy Prime Minister	Dilrabo Mansuri Saidullo
Deputy Prime Minister	Usmonali Usmonzoda
Minister of Justice	Muzaffar Ashuriyon
Minister of Finance	Fayziddin Qahhorda
Minister of Economic Development and Trade	Jamoliddin Abdullozoda
Chairman of the State Committee for Investment and State Property Management	Sulton Rahimzoda

== Organizations under the Government ==
- Tax Committee
- Committee on Food Safety
- Committee on Language and Terminology
- Committee on Women and Family Affairs
- Committee on Architecture and Construction
- Committee on Primary and Secondary Vocational Education
- Committee on Religion, Regulation of Traditions, Celebrations and Rituals
- Committees on Television and Radio
- Committee for Environmental Protection
- Committee of Emergency Situations and Civil Defense
- Committee for Youth and Sports Affairs
- Committee for Tourism Development
- Committee on Housing and Communal Services
- Execution Service
- Communication Service
- Customs Service
- Antimonopoly Service
- State Service for Supervision of Industrial Safety and Mining Operations
- Agency for Export
- Civil Aviation Agency under the Government of the Republic of Tajikistan
- Agency for Land Reclamation and Irrigation
- Agency for State Material Reserves
- Agency for Standardization, Metrology, Certification and Trade Inspection
- Agency on Public Procurement of Goods, Works and Services
- Forestry Agency
- Agency for Social Insurance and Pensions
- Main Archive Department
- Main Department of Geology
- Main Directorate for the Protection of State Secrets

== See also ==
- List of heads of government of Tajikistan
- Executive Office of the President of Tajikistan
