= Sagdiyev =

Sagdiyev (Kazakh: Сағдиев, Tajik: Саъдиев, Uzbek: Sa`diev, Russian: Сагдиев, German: Sadijew, Estonian: Sa’dijev) is a surname of Turkic origin. Its feminine form is Sagdiyeva. It is a slavicised version of Sagdi, Sagdat or Sagdatdin by introduction of the suffix -yev.

== Real people with the surname ==
- Edgar Chabibovich Sagdiyev (born 1946)
- Chajrulla Chabibovich Sagdiyev (born 1950)
- Makhtaj Ramasanovich Sagdiyev (1928—2012)
- Samariddin Sagdiyev (1918—1983), Tajik actor
- Shuhrat Sagdiyev (born 1954)

== Fictional characters ==
- Borat Sagdiyev
