= Ministry of Justice (Tajikistan) =

Government ministry of Tajikistan

- Russian: Министерство Юстиции; Tajik: Вазорати адлияи Ҷумҳурии Тоҷикистон
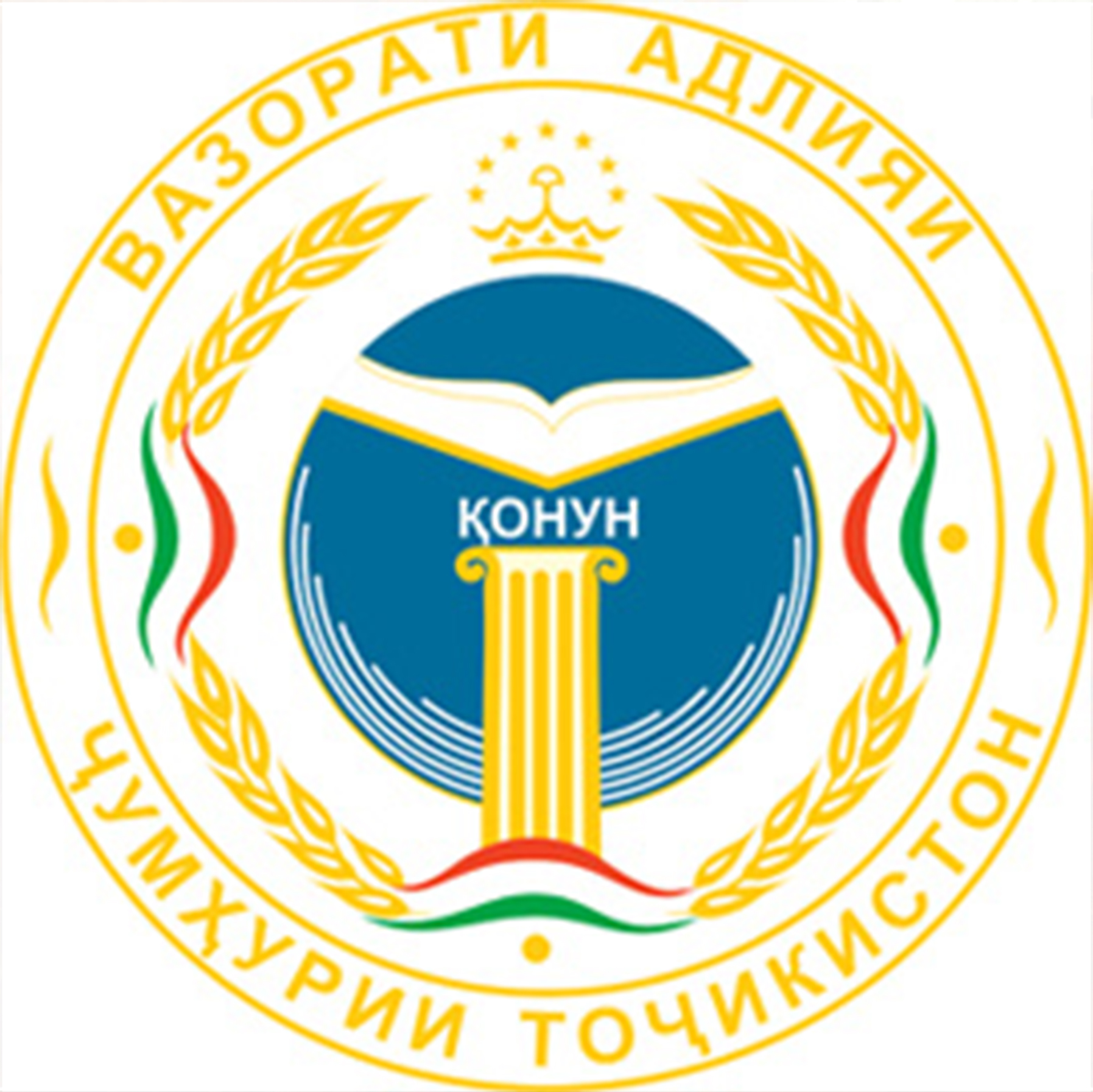

Agency overview
- Formed: 24 February 1925; 101 years ago
- Jurisdiction: Government of Tajikistan
- Headquarters: 25 Rudaki Avenue, Dushanbe
- Minister responsible: Rustam Shoemurod
- Parent agency: Cabinet of Tajikistan
- Child agency: Supreme Court of Tajikistan
- Website: www.minjust.tj

Established in 1925, the Ministry of Justice of the Republic of Tajikistan (Russian: Министерство Юстиции; Tajik: Вазорати адлияи Ҷумҳурии Тоҷикистон) is the executive body implementing the state policy and normative legal regulation in the sphere of legal aid to the citizens, promotion of legal and criminal justice, and judicial and criminal prosecutions. The ministry also works with other justice ministries around the world to prosecute criminals.

== History ==
In 1924, the People's Commissariat of Justice of the Republic of Tajikistan was established by the Tajik Autonomous Soviet Socialist Republic. By the decree of the Council of People's Commissars of the USSR, the Commissariat was given official instructions and tasks on 12 February 1925. On 7 July 1925, the decision of interdepartmental training for administrative staff of the judiciary began by order of the Communist Party of Tajikistan's Central Committee under the auspices of the People's Commissariat for Education (commonly known as the Ministry of Education). As a result of the effective execution of the Commissariat of Justice, neighboring Soviet republics were established their own justice departments. The Tajik People's Commissariat of Justice worked as a branch of the Supreme Soviet of the Uzbek SSR which had supremacy over laws in has worked in the Tajik SSR since 1927, then founded on the basis of the Tajik SSR.

On 20 June 1933, the decision was taken by the Prosecutor's Office to create a separate and independent public prosecutor's office timed for the formation of the Tajik Soviet Socialist Republic (Tajik SSR). The establishment of the Tajik SSR Prosecutor's office has been the task of observing the observance of the law and has been subjected to the right of the people's justice commission. In 1946, the decision of the Tajik SSR's Council of Ministers, its name was changed to the Ministry of Justice of the Tajik SSR. The Ministry of Justice operated at this level until 24 November 1958 replaced it with a legal commission under the Council of Ministers. Furthermore, most of the tasks previously implemented by the ministry were handed over to the Supreme Court of the Tajik SSR, including the inspection and supervision of the activities of the civil courts. After the independence of Tajikistan occurred in 1991, with the aim of ensuring judicial and independent judicial reform in the newly established Republic of Tajikistan. It was first established as the Council of Justice in December 1999 under the Ministry of Internal Affairs. Ministerial status was granted in 2008.

== List of ministers ==
- T. Saifiddinov (1925–1927)
- M. Negmatulloev (1927)
- M. Sadulloev (1927–1931)
- S. Hojiyarov (1931–1933)
- C. Imomov (1933–1935)
- N. Shirinov (1935–1936)
- R. Mahkamov (1936–1937)
- Z. Sharifov (1939–1940)
- M. Rajabekov (1941–1951)
- H. Nazarov (1952–1959)
- M. Ismailov (1959–1970)
- S. Rajabov (1970–1978)
- S. Mahmudov (1978–1990)
- F. Abdulloev (1990–1993)
- Shavkat Ismailov (1993–2001)
- Halifabobo Hamidov (2001–2006)
- Bakhtiyor Khudoyorov (2006–2012)
- R. Mengliev (2012–2013)
- Rustam Shoemurod (2013–present)

== Structure ==
- Central Office
  - Department of Legislation
  - Department of International Legal Relations
  - Department of State Accounting and Registration
  - Department of Legal Assistance to Citizens for Legal Affairs
  - Department of State Registration of Public Organizations and Political Parties
  - Department of Organization of the Activity of Bailiffs
  - Department of Personnel and Special Affairs
  - Department of Finance and Economics
  - General and Execution Control Department
  - Department of State Registration of Mortgage Obligations
  - Household Sector
- Main Department for the Execution of Criminal Punishments
  - Military Unit 6593
- GBAO and Oblast Justice Departments
- Main State Notary Office of the Republic of Tajikistan
  - GBAO Notary Offices
  - Regional Notary Offices
  - City Notary Offices
  - District Notary Offices
- Department of Civil Status Documents
- Republican Center of Forensic Science

=== Institutions and enterprises ===
- Institute for Advanced Training of Employees of Justice and Legal Services
- State Unitary Enterprise "Legislation"

== See also ==
- Justice ministry
- Ministry of Health (Tajikistan)
- Ministry of Internal Affairs (Tajikistan)
- Politics of Tajikistan
