= Georgy Koshlakov =

- Георгий Кошлаков

First Deputy Chairman of the Council of Ministers of the Tajik SSR
- In office 1978–1991
- Premier: Rahmon Nabiyev; Qahhor Mahkamov

Personal details
- Born: February 8, 1936 Sverdlovsk, Sverdlovsk Oblast, Russian SFSR, Soviet Union
- Died: July 7, 2017 (aged 81) Dushanbe, Tajikistan
- Education: Candidate of Sciences,
- Alma mater: Central Asian Poly-Technical Institute, 1958; Institute of National Economic Management under the Council of Ministers, 1976
- Occupation: Geologist

Georgy Vadimovich Koshlakov (Russian: Георгий Вадимович Кошлаков; 8 February 1936 – 7 July 2017) was a Tajikistani politician of Russian descent who served as the deputy Prime Minister of Tajikistan. On January 23, 1989, the Gissar earthquake occurred. He is quoted as saying: "The earthquake caused a burst of mud from the foothills which poured down on the villages. It was up to five miles wide and one-and-a-half miles long." He was a head of the Department of Economics and Management at the Russian-Tajik Slavonic University.

== Biography ==
In 1958, he graduated from the Central Asian Polytechnic Institute (now Tashkent State Technical University) and in 1976 from the Institute of National Economic Management under the Council of Ministers. From 1958-1966, he was an engineer-operator, senior geophysicist, and head of the party of the Geology Department of the Tajik SSR. From 1966-1974, Chief Engineer of the Southern Geophysical Expedition, Geology Department of the Tajik SSR. From 1974-1978, Head of the Geology Department of the Tajik SSR. In 1978, he was appointed Deputy Chairman, then First Deputy Chairman of the Council of Ministers of the Tajik SSR, serving until 1991. He served under premiers Rahmon Nabiyev and Qahhor Mahkamov.

From 1989-1991, he was People's Deputy from the Rushon Electoral District No. 715 of the Gorno-Badakhshan Autonomous Region. He was also a Deputy of the Supreme Soviet of the Tajik Soviet Socialist Republic from the 9th-11th convocations. In 1991, he was made Minister of Industry and Raw Materials and then Chairman of the State Committee on Economy and Forecasting. He then was Director of Industry of JSC Ecotad (1992-1993), Senior Advisor to the Prime Minister (Abdujalil Samadov and Jamshed Karimov) and President (Emomali Rahmon) on National Economy (1993-1996). From 1996-2001, he was Head of the Department of Development of Mountain Territories of the SOPS Tajik Academy of Sciences and from 2001-2011, served as Head of the Department of Economics and Management of the Russian-Tajik Slavonic University. From 2011 to his death, he had been a Professor of the Department of the Russian-Tajik Slavonic University.

== Awards and titles ==
- Order of Friendship (Tajikistan)
- Order of Friendship (July 28, 2015, Russia)
- Order of the Red Banner of Labor
- Order of Friendship of Peoples
- Honorary Geologist of the USSR (1986)
- Honored Engineer of the Tajik SSR (1986)
- Laureate of the Abu Ali ibn Sino State Prize (1977)
- Excellent Education Worker of the Republic of Tajikistan (2006)
