= Davlatali Said =

Tajik politician

Davlatali Said is a politician from Tajikistan who served as First Deputy Prime Minister in Cabinet of Tajikistan from November 19, 2013 - January 5, 2023.
