= Samariddin Sagdiyev =

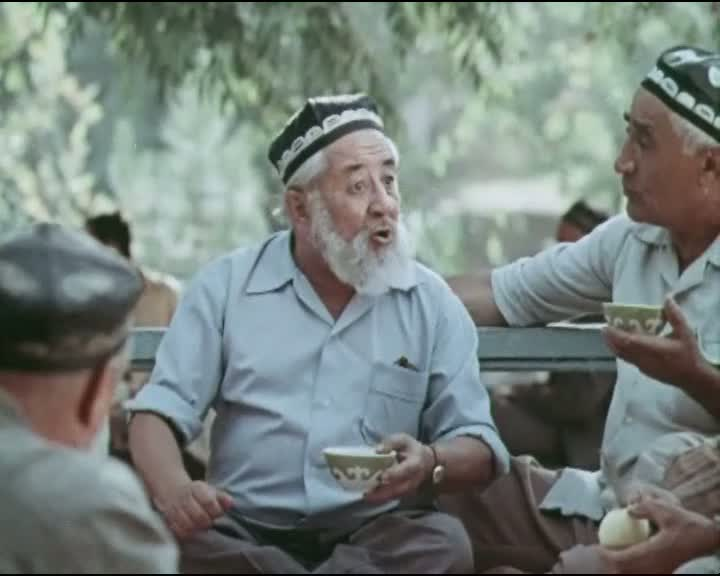
- Born: 1918; Samarqand
- Died: 1983; Dushanbe
- Occupation: Film actor

Samariddin Sagdiyev (Tajik: Самариддин Саъдиев, Uzbek: Samariddin Sa`diev, Russian: Самариддин Сагдиев, German: Samariddin Sadijew; 10 January 1918 in Samarqand, Uzbek SSR, Soviet Union - 29 May 1983 in Dushanbe, Tajik SSR) was a Tajik actor of Uzbek origin.

== Life ==
After education at the Samarqand Drama College (1935) and the Tashkent College of Music (1936), he began to work as a theater actor. In 1936 he was sent to the Tajik SSR. From 1956 he worked there at the well-known film studio Tajikfilm. In 1962 he was awarded the title of "People's Artist of the Tajik SSR".

== Family ==
His son Shuhrat Sagdiyev is a historian and university lecturer at the Russian-Tajik Slavonic University.

== Films ==
He participated as an actor in following films:

- Russian: Я встретил девушку, lit. 'I met a girl' (1957)
- Russian: Сыну пора жениться, lit. 'It's time for my son to get married' (1959)
- Russian: Ураган в долине, lit. 'Hurricane in the Valley' (1972)
- Russian: Отважный Ширак, lit. 'Courageous Chirac' (1976)
- Russian: Апрельские сны, lit. 'April Dreams' (1980)
- Russian: Гляди веселей, lit. 'Look more cheerful' (1982)
