= Ministry of Health (Tajikistan) =

Government ministry of Tajikistan

The Ministry of Health and Social Protection is a government ministry that governs and manages healthcare and the health industry in Tajikistan, including the nation's public health system. The Ministry was founded in 2006 and is located in Dushanbe.

== Structure ==
- Central Administration
- Health Service Department
- Human Resource and Science Department
- Health Reform and External Relations Department
- Mother and Child Health and Family Planning Department
- Economics and Health Budget Planning Department
- Pharmacy and Medical Supplies Department
- Sanitary Epidemiological Surveillance Department
- Accounting Department
- Legal Department
- Disaster Preparedness and Emergency Care Department
- Internal Audit Department
- Administrative Department
- Human Resource Department
- Health Department of Gorno-Badakhshan Autonomous Region, the Oblasts and Dushanbe
- State Pharmaceutical Activity Surveillance Centre
- State Sanitary Epidemiological Surveillance Center

== Agencies and organizations ==
- National Health Centre
- National Diagnostic Centre
- National Reproductive Health Centre
- National Drug Abuse Monitoring and Prevention Centre
- State Tajik Postgraduate Education of Health Professionals
- Tajik Research Institute of Obstetrics, Gynecology and Pediatrics
- Tajik Research Centre of Preventive Medicine
- Scientific Centre of Cardiovascular and Chest Surgery
- Scientific Blood Centre
- Scientific-Clinical Stomatology Centre
- Scientific-Training Centre of Plastic Surgery
- Oncologic Scientific Centre
- Clinical Centre of Mental Health
- Child and Adolescent Mental Health Centre
- Clinical Hospital of Mental Health Diseases
- Clinical Centre of Skin and Veneral Diseases
- Clinical Narcology Centre
- Clinical Centre of Ophthalmic Diseases
- Clinical Cardiology Centre
- Clinical Centre of Urinology
- Centre of Spinal Diseases
- Centre of Folk Medicine
- Endocrine Clinical Centre
- Nursing Centre
- State Unitary Enterprise TajikPharmIndustry
- Shifo Magazine
- Tajikistan Health Magazine

== Educational institutions ==
- Avicenna Tajik State Medical University
- Republican Medical College (Dushanbe)
- Medical College (Bokhtar)
- Medical College (Kulab)
- Medical College (Khujand)
- Medical School (Hisor)
- Medical School (Vahdat)
- Medical School (Rasht District)
- Medical School (Yova)
- Medical Schools (Dangara District)
- Medical School (Konibodom)
- Medical School (Istaravshan)
- Medical School (Panjakent)
- Medical School (Khorugh)
- Medical School (Tursunzoda)

== List of ministers ==
- Nasim Olimzoda (2017-5 May 2020)
- Jamoliddin Abdullozoda (since 5 May 2020)

== See also ==
- Government of Tajikistan
- Health in Tajikistan
