= Russian-Tajik Slavonic University =

University in Tajikistan

Coordinates: 38.5751°N 68.7927°E

Russian Tajik Slavonic University
- Российско-Таджикский Славянский Университет
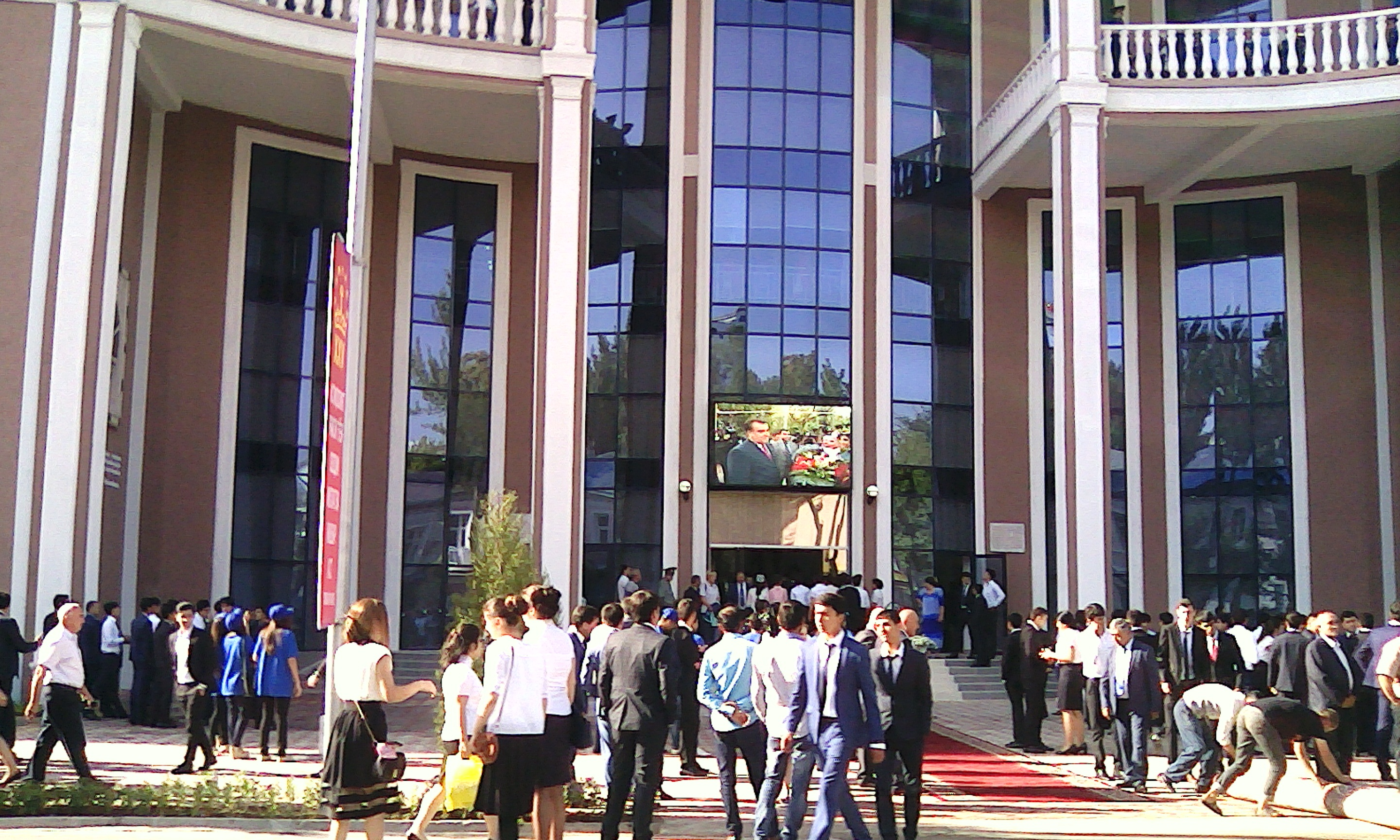
- Type: Public
- Established: 1996
- Rector: Tokhir Khojazoda
- Students: 3,105
- Doctoral students: 44
- Location: Tursun-zade str. 30. Dushanbe, Tajikistan 734025, Dushanbe, Tajikistan
- Campus: Mirzo Tursunzoda 30, Dushanbe city, 734025
- Language: Russian
- Website: www.rtsu.tj/en/

Russian-Tajik Slavonic University (RTSU), also known as Russian-Tajik University (Russian: Российско-Таджикский Университет), is a university in Tajikistan located in Dushanbe. The university was a result of cooperation between the Russian and Tajik governments. The majority of the students come from Russian families living in Tajikistan and the others are from Tajik and Uzbek families. The university is a member of the Euroasian Universities Association (EUA). Besides being Russian-Tajik the university has students in many nationalities including Armenian, Georgian, Ukrainian and others from Post-Soviet states.

== History ==
It was established in 1996 as one of the branches of the University of Slavic Russia in Tajikistan. At early beginning it was one of the strongest universities after the Tajikistani Civil War and other unrest in the republic.

In August 2016, at the opening ceremony of the new building of the university, the President of Tajikistan Emomali Rahmon noted in his speech that over the past years more than 12,000 specialists have been trained at RTSU.

== University structure ==
The university consist of the following departments

- Law department
- Economics department
- Philology department
- Department of History and International relationship
- Department of Management and IT
- Department of Foreign languages

== List of specialties or majors ==
- Faculty of Economics
  - General business school with major in macro and microeconomics.
  - Business school with major on banking industry
- Faculty of History and International relationship
  - Culturology
  - International relationships
- Faculty of Law
  - Lawyers
  - Crime low
- Faculty of Management and Information Technology
  - Applied Information Science in Economics
  - Management
  - Mathematics
  - Physics
  - Biology
  - Chemistry
  - Tourism
- Faculty of Philology
  - Foreign language teaching with major either in English, Chinese or German.
  - Chinese language
  - Russian language and culture
  - Journalism
  - Faculty of Foreign languages

University also provides postgraduate study in economics and philology.

== University partnership ==
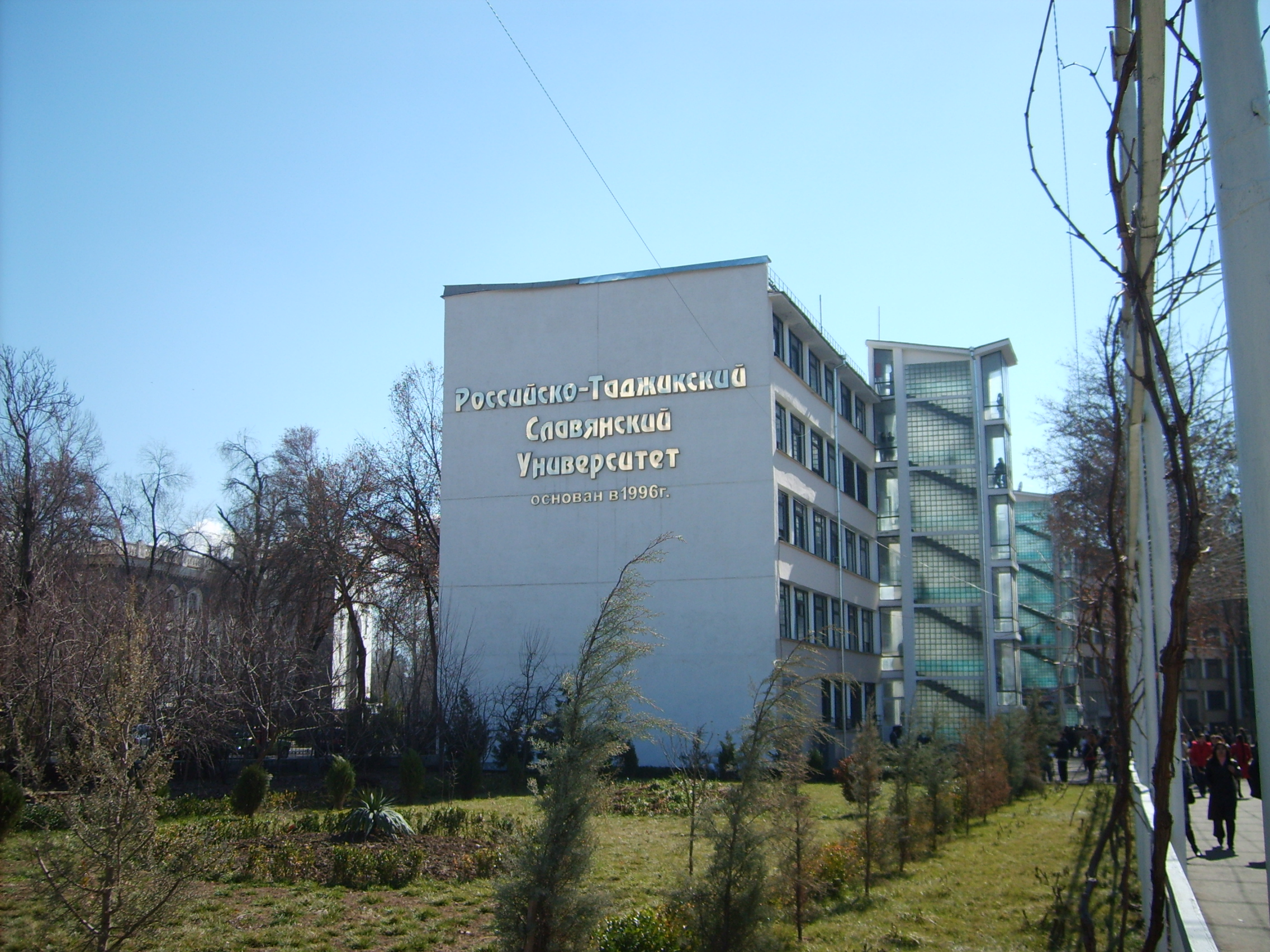
A building of the university.

The university is partnering in education, culture and science with the following organization:

- American Bar Association;
- European Commission;
- Center of Culture "Bactria" (France);
- Center of Culture "Confucius" (China);
- International Committee of the Red Cross (Switzerland);
- Robert Bosh foundation - Robert Bosch GmbH (Germany);
- Centre for International Migration and Development (Germany);
- German Academic Exchange Service (Germany)
- Other CIS organizations

== Notable people ==
=== Rectors of the university ===
- Abdujabbor Sattorov (1996–2006)
- Mahmausuf Imomov (2006–2012)
- Nurali Salihov (2012–2020)
- Tokhir Khojazoda (2020–present)

=== Known professors ===
- Georgy Koshlakov, head of the Department of Economics and Management

=== Honorable doctors of the University ===
- Evgeny Belov – the Ambassador Extraordinary and Plenipotentiary of Russia in Tajikistan
- Maxim Peshkov – the Ambassador Extraordinary and Plenipotentiary of Russia in Tajikistan
- Gennadiy Seleznyov – the Speaker of the State Duma of Russia
- Sergey Mironov – the Chairman of the Federation Council
- Boris Gryzlov – the Speaker of the State Duma of Russia
- Andrei Fursenko – the Minister of Education of Russia
- Yury Luzhkov – former mayor of Moscow
- Valentina Matviyenko - Chairman of the Federation Council
- Sergey Naryshkin - Chairman of the State Duma

=== Alumni ===
- Alex Sodiqov
