= Alim Sherzamonov =

Alim Sherzamonov is a politician in Tajikistan.

Sherzamonov is credited with playing a leadership role during political unrest in Khorog, the capital of the autonomous republic of Gorno-Badakhshan, in 2012. Sherzamonov said he participated in demonstrations during the summer of 2012 in a peaceful and non-violent role.

On June 16, 2014, individuals who identified themselves as Tajikistan government security officials apprehended Alex Sodiqov, a Political Science PhD candidate at the University of Toronto, during an interview with Sherzamanov. In a report about the incident, Human Rights Watch described Sherzamonov as a "civil society activist". In the CACI Analyst, Kirgizbek Kanunov wrote that Tajikistan's National Security Committee had described Sodiqov as an agent for a foreign government, who was negotiating with Sherzamonov on their behalf. CTV News reported Sherzamonov claimed security officials had planned to arrest him, as well. Global Voices, a site Sodiqov has contributed to, reported that "it appears Sodiqov is being used to discredit Sherzamonov".
