= Hokim Kholiqzoda =

Tajik politician

- Ҳоким Холиқзода
- Kholiqzoda in 2026

First Deputy Prime Minister of Tajikistan
- Incumbent
- Assumed office 16 January 2024
- President: Emomali Rahmon
- Prime Minister: Qohir Rasulzoda
- Preceded by: Davlatali Said

Chairman of the National Bank of Tajikistan
- In office 20 November 2020 – 16 January 2024
- Preceded by: Jamshed Nurmahmadzoda
- Succeeded by: Firdavs Tolibzoda

Personal details
- Born: 27 July 1973 (age 53)
- Party: People's Democratic Party of Tajikistan

Hokim Hikmatullo Kholiqzoda (Note: Alternatively Hokimjon Hikmatulloyevich Holiqov from Tajik: Ҳокимҷон Ҳикматуллоевич Холиқов.) (Tajik: Ҳоким Ҳикматулло Холиқзода; born 27 July 1973) is a Tajik politician who has served as the First Deputy Prime Minister of Tajikistan since 16 January 2024.

Kholiqzoda was born on 27 July 1973. He has business, economics and finance degrees from Tajik National University.

Kholiqzoda was elected as a member of the lower house of the Parliament of Tajikistan from 2015 to 2020. On 20 June 2020 he was appointed as the deputy chairman of National Bank of Tajikistan, and in November the same year he was appointed as the chairman of the central bank. He left the leadership of the bank in January 2024, when he was appointed as the First Deputy Prime Minister.
