= Alex Sodiqov =

Alexander Sodiqov
- Born: September 17, 1983 (age 43); Panjakent, Tajik Soviet Socialist Republic, Soviet Union
- Occupation: PhD Student
- Known for: Captured and accused of spying, by Tajikistan security officials

Alex Sodiqov, born as Alexander Sodiqov (Tajik: Александр Содиқов; Russian: Александр Cодиков; born September 7, 1983) is a political science PhD student at the University of Toronto, who was apprehended by security officials in Tajikistan on June 16, 2014 and charged with treason and espionage.

== Overview ==
Sodiqov was born in the town of Panjakent, in northern Tajikistan within the Soviet Union. He graduated from the Russian-Tajik Slavonic University with a degree in international relations and received a master's degree in conflict, development and security from the University of Leeds in 2008. Sodiqov worked for the National Democratic Institute (NDI), Organization for Security and Co-operation in Europe (OSCE) and UNICEF, and lectured at the Russian-Tajik Slavonic University in Dushanbe, Tajikistan. He also blogged at Tajikistan Monitor and served as Central Asia Editor at Global Voices Online. In 2011, Sodiqov was admitted to the PhD program in political science at the University of Toronto, Canada.

== Arrest and charges ==
He returned to Tajikistan with his wife and daughter in June 2014 to work on a research project funded by the UK Economic and Social Research Council. Under this project, Sodiqov had a contract with the University of Exeter. The project was investigating "the failure of Western approaches to conflict management" in former Soviet republics.

On June 15, Sodiqov traveled to Khorog, the capital of the Gorno-Badakhshan Autonomous Province in eastern Tajikistan, to interview a number of civil society representatives. There had been an outbreak of violence in Khorog in 2012, that was the subject of the study Sodiqov worked on. On June 16, he was apprehended by security officials during an interview with Alim Sherzamonov, the head of the local branch of the Social-Democratic Party of Tajikistan (SDPT), in Khorog. The next day he was transported to the State Committee for National Security (SCNS) office in Dushanbe.

On June 17, 2014, the SCNS issued a statement, claiming that Sodiqov had been detained for collecting information that "undermined national security". The SCNS alleged that Sodiqov was working for an unnamed "foreign intelligence service". Within the next several days, Sodiqov appeared at least twice on national television. The heavily edited video aimed at discrediting both him and the opposition politician he had been meeting at the time of his apprehension.

Following Sodiqov's detention, the project he had been working on, the University of Exeter, University of Toronto, and UK Economic and Social Research Council made statements confirming that Sodiqov was a scholar under a research contract with the University of Exeter, rather than a spy. They also confirmed that the purpose of Sodiqov's trip to Khorog had been purely academic.

Despite these reassurances, the SCNS formally charged Sodiqov under Article 305 of Tajikistan's Criminal Code ("High Treason"), which carries a prison sentence of between 12 and 20 years. He was placed in the SCNS pre-trial detention centre on 19 June 2014 and his case was classified as "top secret".

== International pressure ==
Sodiqov's arrest on espionage and treason charges generated international outcry, with many rights groups and watchdogs calling for information, fair treatment and his release. Within days after the scholar was detained, the British ambassador to Tajikistan, the European Union delegation to the country, and the OSCE Representative on Freedom of the Media expressed concern about the detention of the scholar and the charges laid against him. Freedom House demanded immediate information about where and why the scholar was held by the authorities. Human Rights Watch called on Tajikistan to present credible evidence against the scholar or release him immediately. Amnesty International called Sodiqov a "prisoner of conscience" and claimed that charges laid against him were "politically motivated". Reporters Without Borders called for Sodiqov's immediate release, describing charges laid against him as "absurd". The Canadian Journalists for Free Expression (CJFE), PEN International, and a coalition of over 60 human rights NGOs from across the OSCE region also condemned Sodiqov's arrest and demanded that Tajikistan release him.

Academic institutions, societies, scholars, and academic freedom groups also organized a campaign to pressure Tajikistan into releasing the scholar and dropping charges against him. The University of Toronto that Sodiqov was affiliated with expressed concern about Sodiqov's detention and requested that Tajikistan resolve the matter with his detention. The department of political science at McGill University issued a similar statement. A number of petitions demanding Sodiqov's release, including one organized by Tajikistani students and alumni of foreign universities and one organized by a group of "concerned scholars," were circulating online. The scholar's academic supervisor and other graduate students at the University of Toronto set up a website, www.freealexsodiqov.org, and used social media to disseminate information about Sodiqov's cause, using the hashtag #freealexsodiqov. The Canadian Association of University Teachers (CAUT) called on Tajikistan to "immediately release" Sodiqov. Scholars at Risk, an international group comprising over 300 academic institutions in 36 countries, sent a letter to Tajikistan's foreign minister, requesting that the scholar is released. On 23 June 2014, four academic societies (the Association for Slavic, East European, and Eurasian Studies; Association for the Study of Nationalities; Central Eurasian Studies Society (CESS); and European Society for Central Asian Studies) representing about 4,500 scholars of Eurasia expressed "strong concern" over Sodiqov's detention and asked the head of Tajikistan's State Committee for National Security to release him. In July 2014, a broader statement from 20 scholarly societies encompassing over 60,000 academics called for Sodiqov's release. Several French and Swiss academic societies supported the statement.

Although much less is known about international political and diplomatic pressure exerted on Tajikistan to release Sodiqov, that pressure was significant. Shortly after the scholar's arrest, the government of Canada requested that Tajikistan's Ministry of Foreign Affairs keep it informed about Sodiqov's case. Canadian and British envoys in Central Asia were also discussing the case with the authorities in Tajikistan. Chrystia Freeland, who was at the time a member of Canadian parliament, said she was concerned about the scholar's detainment and that she was joining efforts to ensure his release. Another Canadian MP, Paul Dewar, sent a letter to Canada's Minister of Foreign Affairs, requesting information about the Canadian government's efforts to secure the scholar's release. The United States government was also in close contract with Tajikistan about the scholar's case, particularly because the US is the principal provider of training, equipment, and other types of support for the State Committee for National Security that had arrested Sodiqov. On July 17, 2014, the US envoy to the OSCE told the organization's permanent council in Vienna that the United States was "deeply concerned" about the scholar's continuing detention.

Sirojiddin Aslov, the then-Foreign Minister of Tajikistan, came under significant political pressure during his official visit to Great Britain in early July 2014. Shortly before the visit, a group of British scholars penned a letter to the United Kingdom's foreign secretary William Hague, describing Sodiqov's arrest as an attack on academic freedom and asking him to call on the Tajik minister to release the scholar. When Aslov arrived in London, Hague did not meet with him. Instead, the-then senior minister of state Baroness Warsi met with the Tajik foreign minister, raising the case of the scholar's arrest with him. The case was also raised at Aslov's meeting with British members of parliament, selected lords and ladies, and academics.

== Release ==
On 22 July 2014, after more than a month in detention, Sodiqov was released on an understanding not to leave the city or talk to media about his case. On August 18, as the initial period of investigation into Sodiqov's case expired, the authorities extended the investigation and announced that the case was still open. On September 10, 2014, the scholar was allowed to return to his studies in Canada, although Tajikistan did not drop the charges against him or close the case.

== See also ==
- Tajiks in Canada
- Scholars at Risk
