= Tajikistani ruble =

Former currency of Tajikistan

рубл (Tajik)

ISO 4217
- Code: TJR

Units of account
- Subunit
- 1/100: tanga

Denominations
- Banknotes
- Freq. used: 1, 5, 10, 20, 50, 100, 200, 500, 1000 rubles

Demographics
- Date of introduction: 10 May 1995
- Replaced: Soviet ruble
- Date of withdrawal: 29 October 2000
- Replaced by: Tajikistani somoni
- User(s): Tajikistan

Valuation
- Inflation: 33%
- Source: The World Factbook, 2000 est.
- This infobox shows the latest status before this currency was rendered obsolete.

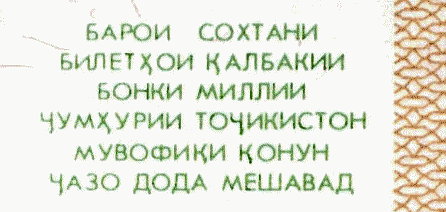
Anti-counterfeiting law text note from the reverse of the 1 Tajikistani ruble note.

The ruble (Tajik: рубл, romanized: Rubl) was the currency of Tajikistan between 10 May 1995 and 29 October 2000. It was ostensibly subdivided into 100 tanga, although no coins or banknotes were issued denominated in tanga. The currency was only issued as paper money, with denominations to up to 1000 rubles.

== History ==
Like a number of other republics of the former Soviet Union, Tajikistan continued using the Soviet and Russian rubles for a few years after independence. On 26 July 1993, when the new Russian ruble was issued, old Soviet rubles ceased to be legal tender in Russia. In Tajikistan, pre-1993 Soviet rubles ceased to be legal tender on 8 January 1994. On 10 May 1995, the Russian ruble was replaced by the Tajikistani ruble at a rate of 100:1.

Among the republics of the former Soviet Union, Tajikistan was the last to issue its own currency. Transnistria, an unrecognized state, issued its own ruble before Tajikistan did. The reason for this was largely lack of funds and resources, with Tajikistan being the poorest of the former Soviet republics and absorbing its share of the former union's economic collapse. This was compounded further by the disorganization caused by the civil war in Tajikistan.

By the end of the decade, rampant inflation caused by economic problems had essentially destroyed the Tajikistani ruble, and plans to replace it with a new currency were drawn up in 1999.

On 30 October 2000, the somoni was introduced and replaced the ruble with 1 somoni equal to 1,000 rubles. Ruble banknotes were permitted to circulate until 1 April 2001.

== Coin ==
Only one commemorative coin was issued for the Tajikistani ruble. These were aimed for the collectors market and were never intended for use in circulation.

The commemorative Tajikistani ruble coin
Value	Technical parameters			Description			Date of minting
Value	Diameter	Mass	Composition	Edge	Obverse	Reverse	Date of minting
20 rubles	35.1 mm	20 g	900‰ silver	Reeded	Ismail Samani	Royal device	1999
For table standards, see the coin specification table.

== Banknotes ==
The Tajikistani ruble banknotes have a striking similarity to the 1961, 1991 and 1992 banknote series of the Soviet/Russian ruble, with similar size, colour scheme, positioning of objects and the font. The colour schemes can be traced back to the later issues of the Russian Empire. Many of the old printing templates used for the production of Soviet ruble notes were reused on Tajikistan's notes. This is because the Tajikistani ruble was printed under the direction of Goznak, the official Russian agency responsible for the production of banknotes and coins. While banknotes of 5000 and 10,000 rubles were printed, they were never issued for circulation.

The banknote series
Image		Value	Dimensions	Main Colour	Description			Date of	
Obverse	Reverse	Value	Dimensions	Main Colour	Obverse	Reverse	Watermark	printing	issue
		1 ruble	102 × 55 mm	Brown	Coat of arms and patterns	Flag of Tajikistan over Supreme Assembly (Majlisi Olii)	Multi-star pattern	1994	1995
		5 rubles	102 × 55 mm	Blue	Coat of arms and patterns	Flag of Tajikistan over Supreme Assembly (Majlisi Olii)	Multi-star pattern	1994	1995
		10 rubles	102 × 55 mm	Red	Coat of arms and patterns	Flag of Tajikistan over Supreme Assembly (Majlisi Olii)	Multi-star pattern	1994	1995
		20 rubles	102 × 55 mm	Lilac	Coat of arms and patterns	Flag of Tajikistan over Supreme Assembly (Majlisi Olii)	Multi-star pattern	1994	1995
		50 rubles	102 × 55 mm	Green	Coat of arms and patterns	Flag of Tajikistan over Supreme Assembly (Majlisi Olii)	Multi-star pattern	1994	1995
		100 rubles	121 × 60 mm	Brown	Coat of arms and patterns	Flag of Tajikistan over Supreme Assembly (Majlisi Olii)	Multi-star pattern	1994	1995
		200 rubles	121 × 60 mm	Olive-green and pale violet	Coat of arms and patterns	Flag of Tajikistan over Supreme Assembly (Majlisi Olii)	Multi-star pattern	1994	1995
		500 rubles	121 × 60 mm	Dark pink	Coat of arms and patterns	Flag of Tajikistan over Supreme Assembly (Majlisi Olii)	Multi-star pattern	1994	1995
		1,000 rubles	143 × 71 mm	Brown and purple	Coat of arms and patterns	Flag of Tajikistan over Supreme Assembly (Majlisi Olii)	Multi-star pattern	1994	1999
		5,000 rubles	143 × 71 mm	Blue	Coat of arms and patterns	Flag of Tajikistan over Supreme Assembly (Majlisi Olii)	Multi-star pattern	1994	Never issued
		10,000 rubles	143 × 71 mm	Orange	Coat of arms and patterns	Flag of Tajikistan over Supreme Assembly (Majlisi Olii)	Multi-star pattern	1994	Never issued
For table standards, see the banknote specification table.

== Historical exchange rates ==
Year	TJR per USD
1995	104
1996	292
1997	559
1998	781
1999	1237
2000	1550

== See also ==
- Economy of Tajikistan

Preceded by: Russian rouble Reason: independence and inflation Ratio: 1 Tajikistani rouble = 100 Russian roubles	Currency of Tajikistan; 1995 – 2000	Succeeded by: Tajikistani somoni Reason: inflation Ratio: SM 1 = 1,000 Rbls
