= Matlubakhon Sattoriyon =

Tajik statesman and politician

- Матлубахон Сатториён

Minister of Culture of Tajikistan
- Incumbent
- Assumed office January 29, 2024
- President: Emomali Rahmon
- Preceded by: Shamsiddin Orumbekzoda

Deputy Prime Minister of Tajikistan
- In office November 3, 2020 – January 29, 2024
- President: Emomali Rahmon

Personal details
- Born: 19 September 1972 (age 53) Ghafurov, Tajik SSR, Soviet Union (now Tajikistan)
- Party: People's Democratic Party

Matlubakhon Sattoriyon (Sattoriyon Matlubakhon Amonzoda, Tajik: Сатториён Матлубахон Амонзода; born September 19, 1972, Sughd province) is a Tajik politician. She is a candidate of philological sciences (2004). She served as Deputy Prime Minister of the Republic of Tajikistan (2020–2024) and took the position of Minister of Culture of Tajikistan in January 2024.

== Early life ==
Matlubakhon Sattoriyon was born on September 19, 1972, in the district of Ghafurov. She graduated from the State Pedagogical Institute with a specialization in teaching Tajik language and literature in 1994.

In 2004, she defended her thesis on "Features of Persian-Tajik lexicography of the second half of the 19th century and the beginning of the 20th century: (Based on the material of the Farhang-e Neẓām)".

== Personal life ==
She is married and has two children.

== Career ==
Matlubakhon Sattoriyon worked as an organizer, teacher, and assistant professor of the Tajik language department of the Faculty of Tajik Philology at Khujand State University from 1994 to 2002, then as vice-dean and assistant professor from 2002 to 2003, and from 2003 to 2008 as a senior specialist, and as deputy head of the department of science.

From 2008 to 2011, she was the chairperson of the Committee on Women and Family Affairs of the executive authority of Sughd province. From January to August 2011, she was the appointed mayor of Taboshar city. From 2011 to 2014 she was the mayor of Istiklol city. From 2014 to 2018, she was the mayor of Guliston city, and from 2018 to 2020, she was the chairperson of the executive committee of the People's Democratic Party of Tajikistan in Sughd province.

Sattoriyon served as Deputy Prime Minister of the Republic of Tajikistan from November 3, 2020, to January 29, 2024.

She was appointed Minister of Culture of the Republic of Tajikistan on January 29, 2024.

== Awards ==
- "20th Anniversary of Independence of the Republic of Tajikistan" (2011)
- "Exemplary Service" (2017).
