= Tajik Canadians =

Тоҷикони Канадо

Total population
- 2,400 (by ancestry, 2011 Census)

Regions with significant populations
- Ontario and Quebec

Languages
- Canadian English · Canadian French · Tajik · Russian

Religion
- Sunni Islam

Related ethnic groups
- Afghan Canadians

Tajik Canadians are Canadian citizens of Tajik descent. According to the 2011 Census there were 2,400 Canadians who claimed Tajik ancestry. Presently in the province of Quebec there are living around 500 families of Tajiks from Tajikistan, Afghanistan, Uzbekistan, Russia, Israel, etc. They reside in Montreal (more than 250 families), Quebec City, Sherbrooke and Granby cities (30 families). More than 500 Tajik families are living in the Toronto area. Around 200 Tajik families are living in the Calgary area and the city of Vancouver.

== History of immigration to Canada ==
The first wave of Tajik immigration to Canada started in the 1970s during the Cold War. Only a small number of Tajiks immigrated during this wave.

The second wave of Tajik immigrants came to Canada during the 1980s, after the Soviet invasion of Afghanistan and the time of Perestroyka of Gorbachev. Tajiks from Tajikistan, Uzbekistan and particularly from Afghanistan moved to Canada.

The third stage of Tajik immigration to Canada started in 1992, when the civil war broke out in the new independent country of Tajikistan. That process has beef up after the Taliban radical movement seized power in Afghanistan (1996), anti-Tajik hatred policy of Taliban regime forced thousands of Tajik people to leave Afghanistan for Canada.

The fourth wave of Tajik immigration has begun since the first decade of the year of 2000. Nowadays, Tajik people from Tajikistan, Afghanistan, Uzbekistan, Israel, and Russia have been entering Canada.

== Notable Tajiks in Canada ==
- Moses Znaimer
- Alexander Sodiqov

== See also ==
- Middle Eastern Canadians
- West Asian Canadians
