= Tanga (currency) =

Tajikistan unit of currency

The tanga (Tajik: танга) was a unit of currency in Tajikistan between 10 May 1995 and 29 October 2000 and was worth one hundredth of a Tajik rouble. No coins or banknotes were ever issued denominated in tanga.

In January 1997 the exchange rate was 350 Tajik roubles per US dollar, making one tanga worth just under 0.003 US cents.
