= Firdavs Tolibzoda =

- Фирдавс Толибзода

Chairman of the National Bank of Tajikistan
- Incumbent
- Assumed office 16 January 2024
- President: Emomali Rahmon
- Preceded by: Hokim Kholiqzoda

Personal details
- Born: Firdavs Nazrimad Tolibzoda; 11 March 1980 (age 46)
- Party: People's Democratic Party of Tajikistan
- Education: National Graduate Institute for Policy Studies
- Profession: Economist, banker

Firdavs Tolibzoda (Tajik: Фирдавс Толибзода; born 11 March 1980) is a Tajik economist and banker who has served as the Chairman of the National Bank of Tajikistan since January 2024. He is a member of People's Democratic Party of Tajikistan.

Tolibzoda was born on 11 March 1980 in Tajikistan. He has a bachelor's degree in banking and finance from Eastern Mediterranean University in Northern Cyprus, and a master's degree from National Graduate Institute for Policy Studies of Saitama University.

Tolibzoda has worked in National Bank of Tajikistan since 2003. He was appointed deputy chairman in 2021 and first deputy chairman in 2022. He was appointed chairman of the National Bank of Tajikistan on 16 January 2024.
