= Supreme Court of Tajikistan =

Most senior body of civil, criminal, and administrative law in the Republic of Tajikistan

Supreme Court of the Republic of Tajikistan
- Суди Олии Ҷумҳурии Тоҷикистон; Верховный суд Республики Таджикистан
- Emblem of Tajikistan
- Established: 1929
- Jurisdiction: Tajikistan
- Location: Namat Karabaev Street, Dushanbe
- Authorised by: Ministry of Justice
- Website: Official site

Chairman of the Supreme Court
- Currently: Shermuhammad Shokhiyon
- Since: 15 April 2015

The Supreme Court of the Republic of Tajikistan (Tajik: Суди Олии Ҷумҳурии Тоҷикистон, romanized: Sudi Olii Chumhurii Tojikiston, Russian: Верховный суд Республики Таджикистан, romanized: Verkhovnyy sud Respubliki Tadzhikistan) is the most senior body of civil, criminal, and administrative law in the Republic of Tajikistan.

== History ==
During the Soviet era, the Supreme Court of the Tajik SSR served as the highest judicial body in the Soviet republic of Tajikistan. In 1924, the People’s Commissariat of Justice (now the Justice Ministry) was created on Tajik territory. 5 years later, the Supreme Court was created. In accordance with the law "On the Judicial System in the Tajik SSR" adopted on 11 December 1981, the Supreme Court of the Tajik SSR was made into independent institution that was elected by the Supreme Soviet of the Tajik SSR. During the transitional period of independence of 1992–1993 which occurred after the collapse of the USSR, the judicial authorities of Tajikistan continued to operate on the basis of the 1978 Constitution of the Tajik SSR until a new judicial law would be adopted. The Supreme Court of the Republic of Tajikistan was reformed on 28 December 1993. As of 2019, the Supreme Court currently consists of 16 judges.

== List of chairmen since independence ==
- Fayzullo Abdulloev (1996–2000)
- Salimboi Fatkhulloev (2000–2006)
- Nusratullo Abdulloev (2006–2015)
- Shermuhammad Shokhiyon (2015–Present)

== Organizational structure ==
The Supreme Court is the highest body in the judicial system which consists of the following elements:

- Civil and criminal court
- Supreme Economic Court
- Military courts (organized by military garrisons)
- Regional courts

The Supreme Court itself consists of the following:

- Plenum
- Presidium
- Judicial board for civil cases
- Judicial board for criminal cases
- Judicial board for administrative cases
- Judicial board for family cases
- Military Collegium
