= Tajikistani somoni =

Currency of Tajikistan

сомонӣ тоҷикӣ (Tajik)
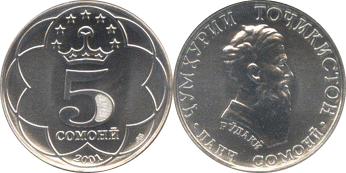
- SM 5 obverse and reverse.

ISO 4217
- Code: TJS (numeric: 972)
- Subunit: 0.01

Units of account
- Symbol: SM
- Subunit
- 1/100: diram

Denominations
- Banknotes
- Freq. used: SM 10, SM 20, SM 50, SM 100, SM 200, SM 500
- Rarely used: 1, 5, 20, 50 dirams, SM 1, SM 3, SM 5
- Coins
- Freq. used: 50 dirams, SM 1, SM 3, SM 5
- Rarely used: 1, 2, 5, 10, 20 25 dirams

Demographics
- Date of introduction: 30 October 2000
- Replaced: Tajik rouble
- User(s): Tajikistan

Issuance
- Central bank: National Bank of Tajikistan
- Website: www.nbt.tj

Valuation
- Inflation: 3.8%
- Source: National Bank of Tajikistan, December 2023

The somoni (Note: /ˌsɒməˈniː/ SOM-ə-NEE; Tajik: сомонӣ, romanized: somoniy, arabized: سامانی, hebraized: סאמאני, IPA: [sɔmɔˈnij]) (ISO 4217 code: TJS, abbreviated: SM) is the currency of Tajikistan. It is subdivided into 100 dirams. (Note: /ˈdɪrəm/ DIRR-əm; Tajik: дирам, romanized: diram, arabized: درم, hebraized: דרם, IPA: [dɪˈɾam])

== History ==
The somoni was introduced on 30 October 2000, replacing the rouble, at the rate of SM 1 = 1,000 Rbls.. It is named after Ismail Samani.

One somoni is divided into 100 dirams. Diram banknotes were first introduced on 30 October 2000, and coins were later introduced in 2001 with the intention of creating a more efficient monetary system and gradually replacing the diram notes. This was also the first time circulating coins were used in Tajikistan since independence in 1991.

== Coins ==
Circulation coins, first issued in 2001, were struck in denominations of 5, 10, 20, 25, and 50 dirams composed of brass-clad steel and SM 1, SM 3, and SM 5 struck in nickel-clad steel. Bimetallic SM 3 and SM 5 coins were first released in 2003. The reverses of all somoni coins are changed annually and commemorate various events. A second issue dated 2011 was issued in June 2012, and included 1, 2, 5, 10, 20, and 50 dirams and SM 1. A third series of somoni coins was issued in 2018 in denominations of SM 1, SM 3 and SM 5.

Tajikistan coins are struck by Goznak at the Saint Petersburg Mint in Russia.

The First Series
Image		Value	Technical parameters				Description			Date of minting
Reverse	Obverse	Value	Diameter	Thickness	Mass	Composition	Edge	Obverse	Reverse	Date of minting
		5 dirams	16.5 mm	1.35 mm	2 g	brass-clad steel	Plain	Tajik 7-star crown, "ҷумҳурии Тоҷикистон", (Note: "ҷумҳурии Тоҷикистон" = "Republic of Tajikistan") year of minting	Value	2001
		10 dirams	17.5 mm	1.4 mm	2.4 g	brass-clad steel	Plain	Tajik 7-star crown, "ҷумҳурии Тоҷикистон", year of minting	Value	2001
		20 dirams	18.5 mm	1.4 mm	2.7 g	brass-clad steel	Plain	Tajik 7-star crown, "ҷумҳурии Тоҷикистон", year of minting	Value	2001
		25 diram	19 mm	1.4 mm	2.76 g	Brass	Plain	Tajik 7-star crown, "ҷумҳурии Тоҷикистон", year of minting	Value	2001
		50 diram	21 mm	1.45 mm	3.6 g	Brass	Plain	Tajik 7-star crown, "ҷумҳурии Тоҷикистон", year of minting	Value	2001
		SM 1	24 mm	1.6 mm	5.2 g	(Note: Standard Catalog of World Coins: 1901–present, 31st ed. states that the composition for SM 1, SM 3, and SM 5 is cupronickel-zinc, while the Central Bank states cupronickel.)	Reeded and plain sections	Ismail Samani, "ҷумҳурии Тоҷикистон", value,	Value and the Tajik 7-star crown, year of minting	2001
		SM 3	25.5 mm	1.8 mm	6.3 g	(Note: Standard Catalog of World Coins: 1901–present, 31st ed. states that the composition for SM 1, SM 3, and SM 5 is cupronickel-zinc, while the Central Bank states cupronickel.)	Lettered	Coat of arms, "ҷумҳурии Тоҷикистон", value	Value and the Tajik 7-star crown, year of minting	2001
		SM 5	26.5 mm	1.85 mm	7 g	(Note: Standard Catalog of World Coins: 1901–present, 31st ed. states that the composition for SM 1, SM 3, and SM 5 is cupronickel-zinc, while the Central Bank states cupronickel.)	Reeded and plain sections with a star	Abuabdullo Rudaki, "ҷумҳурии Тоҷикистон", value, "Рӯдакӣ" (Note: "Рӯдакӣ" = "Rudaki")	Value and the Tajik 7-star crown, year of minting	2001
These images are to scale at 2.5 pixels per millimetre. For table standards, see the coin specification table.

=== Second series (2011) ===
The Second Series
Image		Value	Technical parameters				Description			Date of minting
Reverse	Obverse	Value	Diameter	Thickness	Mass	Composition	Edge	Obverse	Reverse	Date of minting
		1 diram	14.5 mm	1.3 mm	1.3 g	Brass-clad steel	Plain	Coat of arms, "ҷумҳурии Тоҷикистон", year of minting	Value	2011
		2 diram	16 mm	1.4 mm	1.6 g	Brass-clad steel	Plain	Coat of arms, "ҷумҳурии Тоҷикистон", year of minting	Value	2011
		5 diram	18 mm	1.5 mm	2 g	Copper-clad brass	Plain	Coat of arms, "ҷумҳурии Тоҷикистон", year of minting	Value	2011
		10 diram	20.5 mm	1.7 mm	3 g	Copper-clad brass	Plain	Coat of arms, "ҷумҳурии Тоҷикистон", year of minting	Value	2011
		20 diram	23.5 mm	1.8 mm	4.5 g	Copper-clad brass	Corrugated	Coat of arms, "ҷумҳурии Тоҷикистон", year of minting	Value	2011
		50 diram	26 mm	2 mm	5.5 g	Copper-clad brass	reeded	Coat of arms, "ҷумҳурии Тоҷикистон", year of minting	Value	2011
		SM 1	27 mm	1.6 mm	5.2 g	Cupronickel-clad steel	reeded	Coat of arms, "ҷумҳурии Тоҷикистон", year of minting	Value	2011
These images are to scale at 2.5 pixels per millimetre. For table standards, see the coin specification table.

=== Third series (2018) ===
A third series of somoni coins was issued in 2018 in denominations of SM 1, SM 3 and SM 5.

The Third Series
Image		Value	Technical parameters				Description			Date of minting
Reverse	Obverse	Value	Diameter	Thickness	Mass	Composition	Edge	Obverse	Reverse	Date of minting
		SM 1	24.5 mm	1.8 mm	5.8 g	Nickel-brass	Reeded	Country name, Mirzo Tursunzoda	Value and the year of minting	2018
		SM 3	25.5 mm	1.8 mm	6.3 g	Nickel-brass	Plain with lettered inscription "СЕ СОМОНӢ"	Country name, Shirinsho Shotemur	Value and the year of minting	2018
		SM 5	26.5 mm	1.85 mm	7.0 g	Nickel-brass	Reeded	Country name, Sadriddin Aynii	Value and the Tajik 7-star crown, year of minting	2018
These images are to scale at 2.5 pixels per millimetre. For table standards, see the coin specification table.

== Banknotes ==
Banknotes of 1, 5, 20, and 50 dirams, SM 1, SM 5, SM 10, SM 20, SM 50, and SM 100 were printed in 1999 and issued in 2000. Along with a SM 3 note in 2010, inflationary pressure since the introduction of the somoni resulted in the issuing of SM 200 and SM 500 somoni notes that year. The SM 5, SM 10, SM 20, SM 50, and SM 100 somoni notes were reissued in 2013, bearing the year 1999. In 2021, the National Bank of Tajikistan issued a SM 100 banknote, similar to the original issue, but now featuring an image of the Navruz Palace on the back side of the note, replacing the image of the Presidential Palace on the previous issues of the denomination.

The Current Series
Image		Value	Dimensions	Main Colour	Description			Date of	
Obverse	Reverse	Value	Dimensions	Main Colour	Obverse	Reverse	Watermark	printing	issue
		1 diram	100 × 60 mm	Brown	Sadriddin Ayni Theatre and Opera House	Pamir Mountains	Two mountains over rectangle	1999	2000
		5 dirams	100 × 60 mm	Blue	Arbob Cultural Palace	Shrine of Mirzo Tursunzoda	Two mountains over rectangle	1999	2000
		20 dirams	100 × 60 mm	Green	Meetings Hall of the National Bank of Tajikistan	Mountain road	Two mountains over rectangle	1999	2000
		50 dirams	100 × 60 mm	Purple	Ismoili Somoni	Mountain valley	Two mountains over rectangle	1999	2000
		SM 1	141 × 65 mm	Green	Mirzo Tursunzoda	National Bank of Tajikistan	Portrait	1999	2000
		SM 3	141 × 65 mm	Violet	Shirinsho Shotemur	Majlisi Oli	Portrait	2010	2010
		SM 5	144 × 65 mm	Blue	Sadriddin Ayni	Shrine of Abuabdullo Rudaki	Portrait	1999	2000; 2010; 2013; 2017; 2018
		SM 10	147 × 65 mm	Red	Mir Said Alii Hamadoni	Tomb of Mir Said Alii Hamadoni	Portrait	1999	2000; 2010; 2013; 2017; 2018
		SM 20	150 × 65 mm	Yellow-brown	Abuali ibn Sino	Hissar Castle	Portrait	1999	2000; 2010; 2013; 2017; 2018
		SM 50	153 × 65 mm	Blue	Bobojon Gafurov	Chaikhana (teahouse) Sino	Portrait	1999	2000; 2010; 2013; 2017; 2018
		SM 100	156 × 65 mm	Brown	Ismoili Somoni	Presidential Palace	Portrait	1999	2000; 2010; 2013; 2017; 2018
		SM 200	159 x 68 mm	Brown and Yellow	Nusratullo Maksum	National Library building in Dushanbe	Portrait	2010	2010; 2018
		SM 500	162 x 71 mm	Purple and Gray	Abuabdullo Rudaki	Palace of Nations in Dushanbe	Portrait	2010	2010; 2018
These images are to scale at 0.7 pixel per millimetre (18 pixel per inch). For table standards, see the banknote specification table.

Current TJS exchange rates
From Google Finance:	AUD CAD CHF CNY EUR GBP HKD JPY USD RUB EUR JPY
From Yahoo! Finance:	AUD CAD CHF CNY EUR GBP HKD JPY USD RUB EUR JPY
From XE.com:	AUD CAD CHF CNY EUR GBP HKD JPY USD RUB EUR JPY
From OANDA:	AUD CAD CHF CNY EUR GBP HKD JPY USD RUB EUR JPY

== See also ==
- Economy of Tajikistan

Preceded by: Tajik rouble Reason: inflation Ratio: SM 1 = 1,000 Rbls	Currency of Tajikistan; 2000 –	Succeeded by: Current
