= Applied Information Science in Economics =

The Applied Information Science in Economics (Russian: Прикладная информатика в Экономике) or Applied Computer Science in Economics is a professional qualification generally awarded in Russian Federation. The degree inherited from the U.S.S.R. education system also known as Specialist degree. The degree is awarded after five years of full-time study and includes several internships, course-works, thesis writing and defense.

The degree has similarities with German Magister Artium or Diplom degree. However, due to the Bologna Process number of such degrees are declining.

Degree focuses on applying mathematical methods in economics involving maximum information technology. It is very close to applied mathematics, but includes also major part of computer science.

== List of specialty codes in the education system ==
- 080801 - Applied computer science in economics
- 351400 - Applied computer science

== Fields of activity ==
- Organization and management;
- Project design;
- Experimental research;
- Marketing;
- Consulting;
- Operational and Maintenance.

== Major ==
- Information Science and Programming.
- High Level Methods of Information Science and Programming.
- Information Technologies in Economics.
- Computer Systems, Networks and Telecommunications Services.
- Operational Environments, Systems and Shells.
- Architecture and Design of Information Systems for Companies.
- Data Bases.
- Information security.
- Information Management.
- Imitative Simulation.

== See also ==
- Specialist degree
- Academic degree
- Master's degree
- Education in Russia
- Information science
- Computer science
