= National Bank of Tajikistan =

Central Bank of Tajikistan

National Bank of Tajikistan Бонки миллии Тоҷикистон

- Central bank of: Tajikistan
- Headquarters: Dushanbe
- Established: 1991
- Ownership: 100% state ownership
- Chairman: Firdavs Tolibzoda
- Currency: Somoni; TJS (ISO 4217)
- Reserves: 30 million USD
- Preceded by: State Bank of the USSR
- Website: www.nbt.tj

The National Bank of Tajikistan (Tajik: Бонки миллии Тоҷикистон, romanized: Bonki Millī Tojikiston) is the central bank of Tajikistan.

The Bank is engaged in developing policies to promote financial inclusion and is a member of the Alliance for Financial Inclusion. Deposits in the National Bank of Tajikistan during the first half of 2013 were $1.09 million, an increase of more than 17% compared to the same period in 2012.

== Chairperson ==
- Tukhtaboy Gafarov, 1991 - 1992
- Kayum Kavmiddinov, May 1992 - 1996
- Murodali Alimardon, December 1996 - January 2008
- Sharif Rahimzoda, January 2008 - January 2012
- Abdujabbor Shirinov, January 2012 - May 2015
- Jamshed Nurmahmadzoda, May 2015 - November 2020
- Hokim Kholiqzoda, November 2020 - January 2024
- Firdavs Tolibzoda, January 2024

== See also ==
- Economy of Tajikistan
- Ministry of Finance of Tajikistan
- Tajik somoni
- List of central banks
