= Khayrinisso Yusufi =

Tajik politician (born 1964)

Khayrinisso Yusufi, sometimes Iusufi or Mavlonova (Tajik: Хайриниссо Юсуфӣ) (born 1964) is a Tajikistani politician.

Born in Panjakent in Sughd Region, Yusufi studied veterinary science at the Tajik Institute of Agriculture, receiving her degree in 1986. In 2003 she received a degree in philology from Khujand State University, and in 2005 she graduated from the Academy of State Service in Moscow. She began her career in 1986, serving as the chief veterinarian of a veterinary station in her hometown. From 1987 until 1996 she held various command positions in the district committee of the local Komsomol; from 1996 until 2004 she was the deputy chair of the city and of Sughd Region. From 2004 to 2008 she served as vice-premier of Tajikistan. On January 28, 2008 she was appointed to chair the Tajikistani government's Committee on Women and Family. She has also served in the Assembly of Representatives, of which body she was at one time Deputy Speaker, and where she has chaired the Committee on Social Issues, Family and Healthcare.
