= First Deputy Prime Minister of Tajikistan =

The First Deputy Prime Minister of the Republic of Tajikistan (Tajik: Муовини якуми Сарвазири Ҷумҳурии Тоҷикистон) is a government post of the Government of Tajikistan. In the absence of the Prime Minister of Tajikistan, the first deputy performs his or her duties as the acting prime minister. In 1991, the post was grandfathered from the already existing first deputy chairman that was part of the Council of Ministers of the Tajik Soviet Socialist Republic.

In an absence of the first deputy, his or her functions are performed by four other deputy prime ministers who are members of government.

== List ==
- Jamshed Karimov (July 1991 - November 1992)
- Mahmadsaid Ubaydulloyev (1994 - 28 March 1996)
- Yuri Ponosov (28 March 1996 – 18 February 1998)
- Haji Akbar Turajanzade (18 February 1998 - 13 March 2005)
- Asadullo Gulomov (December 1, 2006 - August 3, 2011)
- Matlubkhon Davlatov (2012 - November 19, 2013)
- Davlatali Said (November 19, 2013 - January 5, 2023)
- Hokim Kholiqzoda (since January 16, 2024)

== See also ==
- Deputy Prime Minister of Tajikistan
- First Deputy Prime Minister of Russia
- First Deputy Prime Minister of Belarus
- First Deputy Prime Minister of Ukraine
- First Deputy Prime Minister of Armenia
