= Asadullo Gulomov =

Tajikistani politician

Asadullo Gulomov (28 February 1954 – 2 August 2011) was a Tajik politician who served as the First Deputy Prime Minister of Tajikistan from December 2006 until his death in 2011.

Gulomov was born in Danghara, Tajik Soviet Socialist Republic, in 1954. He graduated from Polytechnical University in Tajikistan. Gulomov died of a sudden stroke on 2 August 2011 while undertaking a helicopter tour of the Sangtuda 1 Hydroelectric Power Plant. He was 57 years old and was survived by his wife and four children.
