= Mayakovsky Theatre (Dushanbe) =

Coordinates: 38°34′37.1″N 68°44′59.2″E

The Mayakovsky Theatre was a historic theatre in Dushanbe, the capital of Tajikistan. It was torn down amid protests in 2016.

The edifice was designed by Pyotr Vaulin and built in the 1920s in what was then known as Stalinabad. It was the first building with permanent foundations to be completed in the future capital, and initially served as a farmers' meeting place. The House of Peasants, as it was known, was the venue where Tajik politician Nusratullo Makhsum declared the creation of the Tajik Soviet Socialist Republic in October 1929.

The building was by turns the venue of Tajikistan's first cinema, its first modern library, first public reading rooms, first theater, first radio broadcasting center, first driving school and first home to the Pioneers youth movement. In its latter years, it was the home of the city's Mayakovsky theatre company.

At the outbreak of the Tajik civil war in the 1990s, the company moved temporarily to Magnitogorsk in Russia. After the war, it was Tajikistan's last surviving Russian-language theatre company with the Mayakovsky as its home. The theatre building was demolished in 2016 as part of the government's wholesale destruction of numerous 20th-century buildings of historical and architectural interest.
