= Mirzo Tursunzoda =

Tajikistani poet (1911–1977)

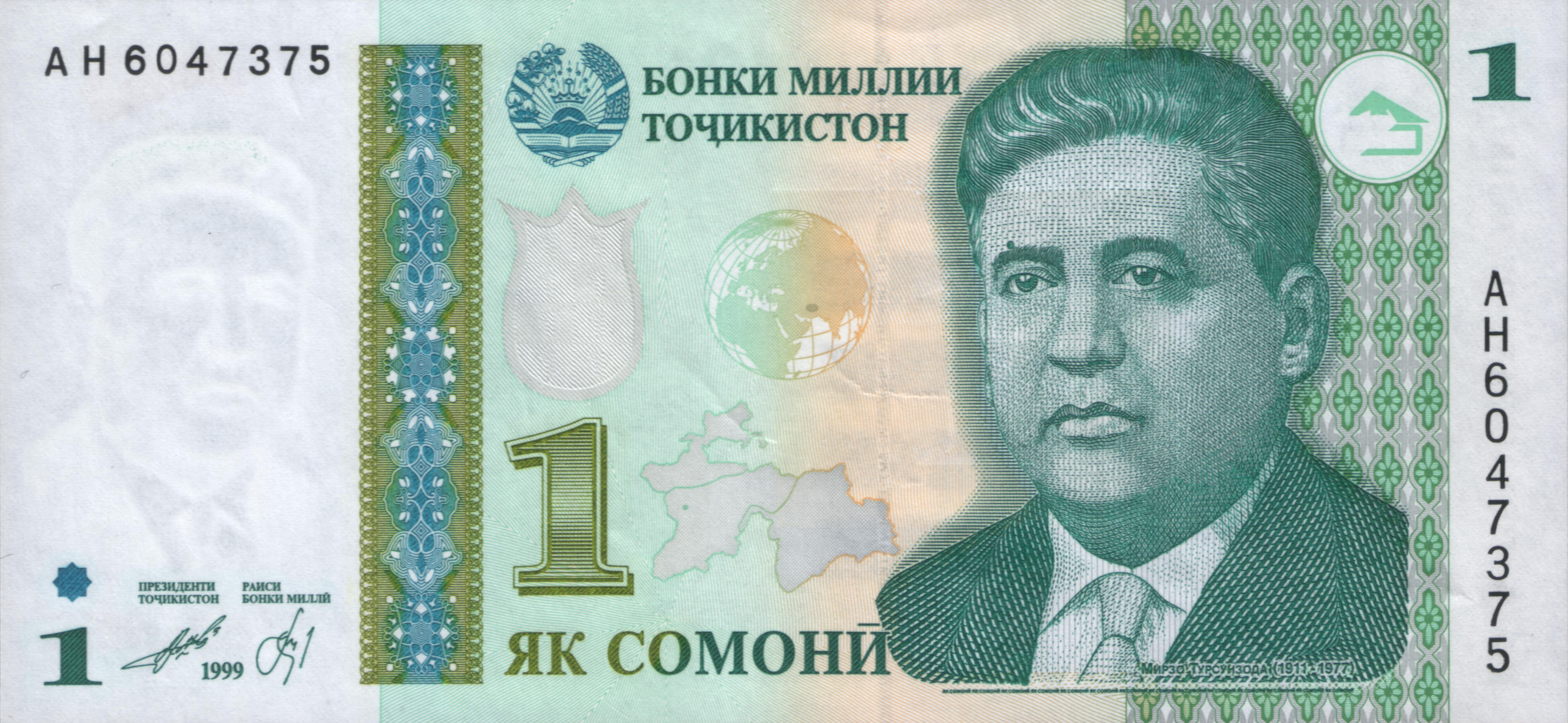
- Tursunzoda on a 1999 Tajik banknote
- Born: 2 May 1911; Karatag, Emirate of Bukhara
- Died: 24 September 1977 (aged 66); Dushanbe, Tajik SSR, Soviet Union
- Occupation: Poet

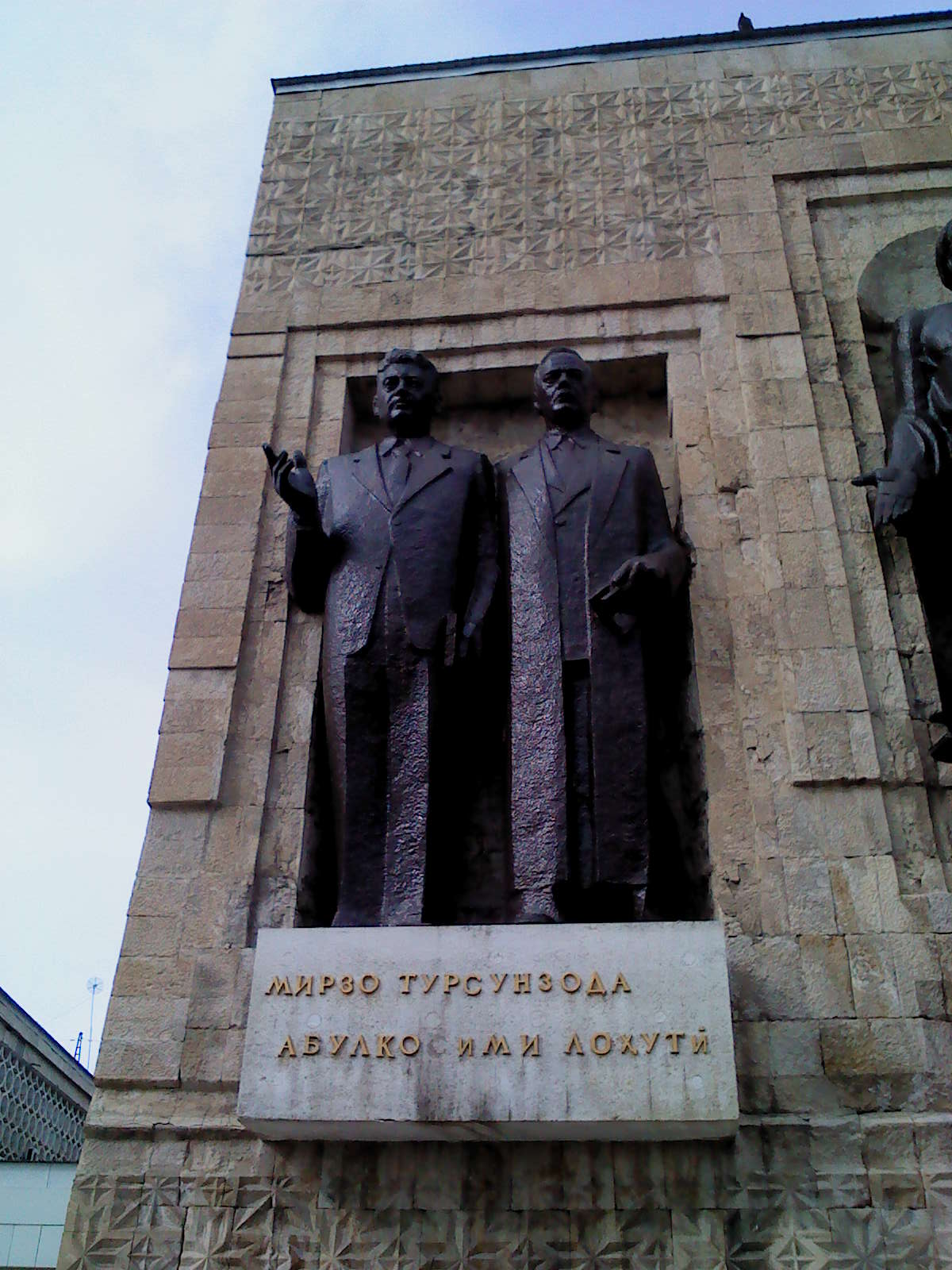
Mirzo Tursunzoda's statue (left) alongside Abolqasem Lahouti (right) at Tajik Writers Union building, Dushanbe

Mirzo Tursunzoda (Tajik: Мирзо Турсунзода, 2 May 1911 – 24 September 1977) was an important Tajik and Soviet poet and a prominent political figure, full member (academician) of the Tajik Academy of Sciences, a member of the Central Committee of the Communist Party of Tajikistan, a member of the Union of Soviet Writers. Today, Tursunzoda has been elevated to the level of Hero of Tajikistan.

Tursunzoda's face appears on the front of the one Somoni note. The town of Tursunzoda (formerly Regar) is named in his honor. Dushanbe's Memorial and Literature Museum was founded in 1981 in honor of Tursunzoda's 70th anniversary.

He was awarded the Stalin prize.
