= Health in Tajikistan =

A diagnostic center in Tajikistan

The Tajikistan health system is influenced by the former Soviet legacy. It is ranked as the poorest country within the WHO European region, including the lowest total health expenditure per capita. Tajikistan is ranked 129th as Human Development Index of 188 countries, with an Index of 0.627 in 2016. In 2016, the SDG Index value was 56. In Tajikistan health indicators such as infant and maternal mortality rates are among the highest of the former Soviet republics. In the post-Soviet era, life expectancy has decreased because of poor nutrition, polluted water supplies, and increased incidence of cholera, malaria, tuberculosis, and typhoid. Because the health care system has deteriorated badly and receives insufficient funding and because sanitation and water supply systems are in declining condition, Tajikistan has a high risk of epidemic disease.

The Human Rights Measurement Initiative finds that Tajikistan is fulfilling 78.1% of what it should be fulfilling for the right to health based on its level of income. When looking at the right to health with respect to children, Tajikistan achieves 96.2% of what is expected based on its current income. In regards to the right to health amongst the adult population, the country achieves 97.5% of what is expected based on the nation's level of income. Tajikistan falls into the "very bad" category when evaluating the right to reproductive health because the nation is fulfilling only 40.8% of what the nation is expected to achieve based on the resources (income) it has available.

== Statistics ==
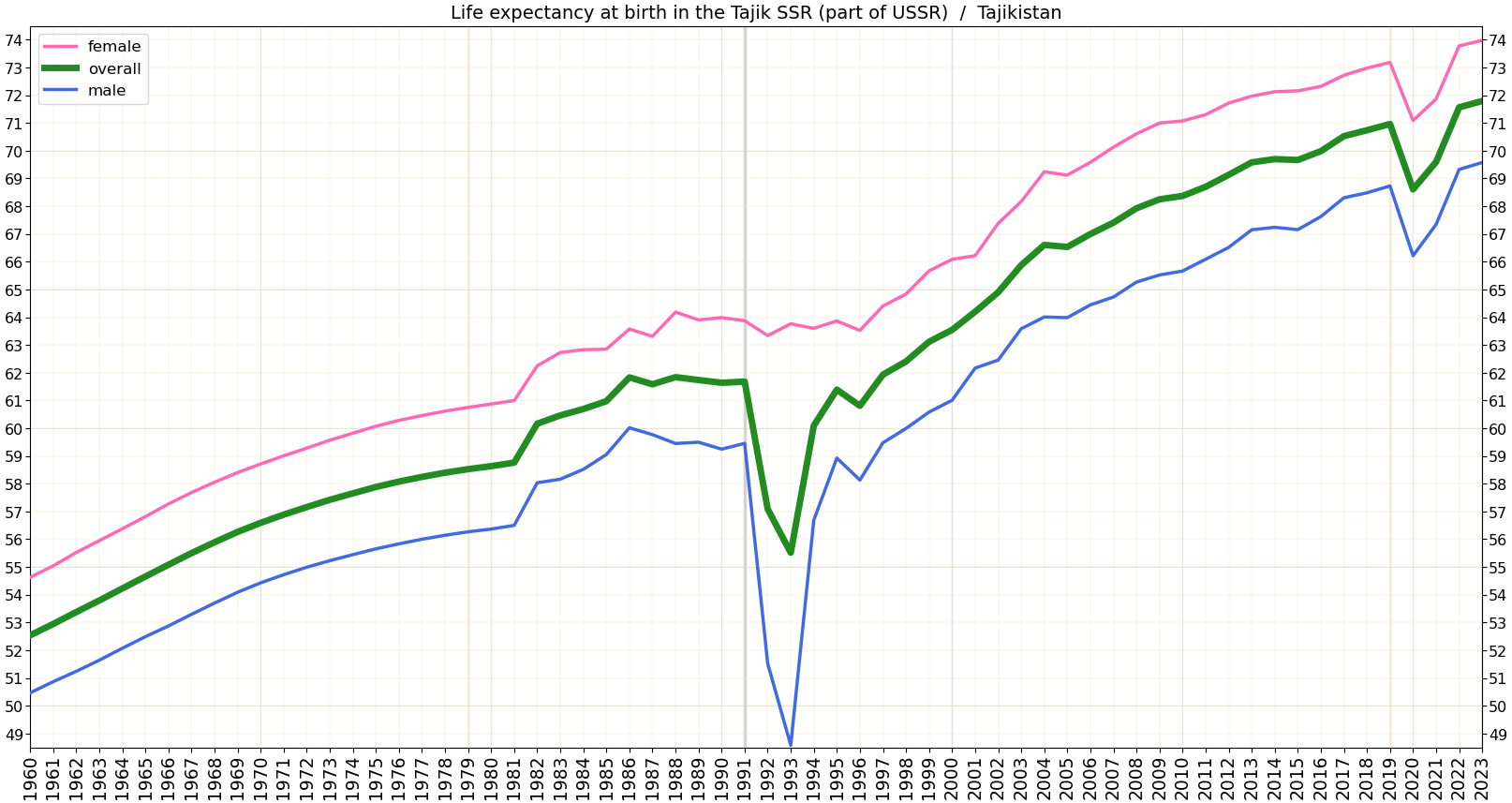
Life expectancy at birth in Tajikistan

Indicator	Rate
Total population (2016)	8,735,000
Gross national income per capita (PPP international $, 2013)	2
Life expectancy at birth m/f (years, 2016)	69/73
Probability of dying between 15 and 60 years m/f (per 1,000 population, 2016)	156/91
Total expenditure on health per capita (Intl $, 2014)	185
Total expenditure on health as % of GDP (2014)	6.9

== Health infrastructure ==
Many Russian doctors left Tajikistan after 1991, leaving the country with the lowest ratio of doctors to population in the former Soviet Union. The necessity of importing all pharmaceuticals has created an acute shortage of some critical items. The shortage of facilities, materials, and personnel is especially serious in rural areas. A presidential program doubled the wages of health workers in 2005. In 2003 a constitutional amendment eliminated the right to free health care for all citizens.

The biggest hospital in Central Asia is in Tajikistan.

== Health status ==
The years following independence (achieved in 1991) were associated with significant deterioration of the population’s health status. This was driven by a rise in both communicable and non-communicable diseases and declining access to health services, especially for the poor.

Tajikistan is in the midst of an epidemiological transition and demographic transition characterized by increasing life expectancy, declining fertility, and the leading causes of death transitioning from communicable to non-communicable disease.

The figure entitled "Population Growth and Crude Death and Birth Rates for Tajikistan between 1950 and 2015" shows the trends in life expectancy at birth (left axis) and total fertility rate (right axis). Life expectancy increased steadily between 1960 and the late 1980s. However, life expectancy declined for men and plateaued for women during the period following independence and civil war. Life expectancy began to rise again for both groups in the late 1990s, reaching 66 for men and 73 for women by 2014. The total fertility rate was increasing between 1960 and 1970, reaching a peak of 6.9 children per woman. After this time, fertility began to decline, reaching 3.4 children per woman by 2016.

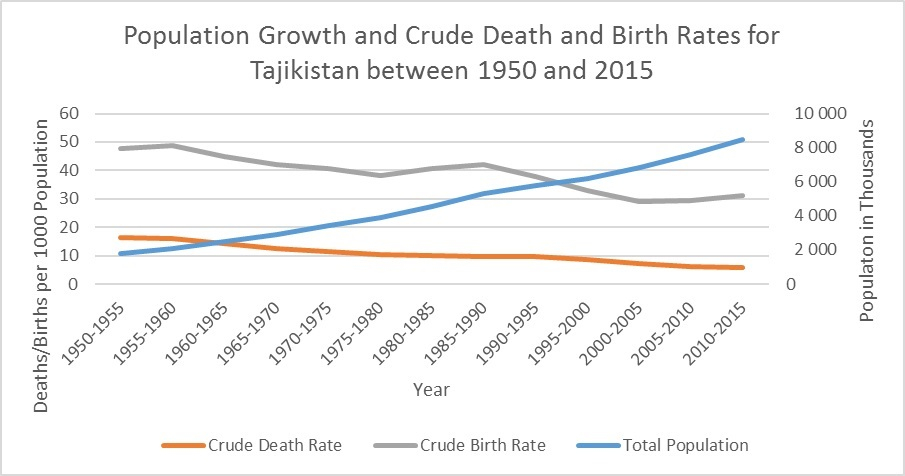
Crude Birth/Death Rate: Number of births or deaths over a given period divided by the person-years lived by the population over that period. It is expressed as average annual number of births or deaths per 1,000 population.

The figure entitled "Trends in Life Expectancy at Birth and Total Fertility Rate in Tajikistan between 1960 and 2014" shows the population growth (right axis) and crude death rate and crude birth rate (left axis). Population growth has risen steadily since 1950. During this same period the crude death rate has slowly decline while the crude birth rate has declined more rapidly and with more variability.

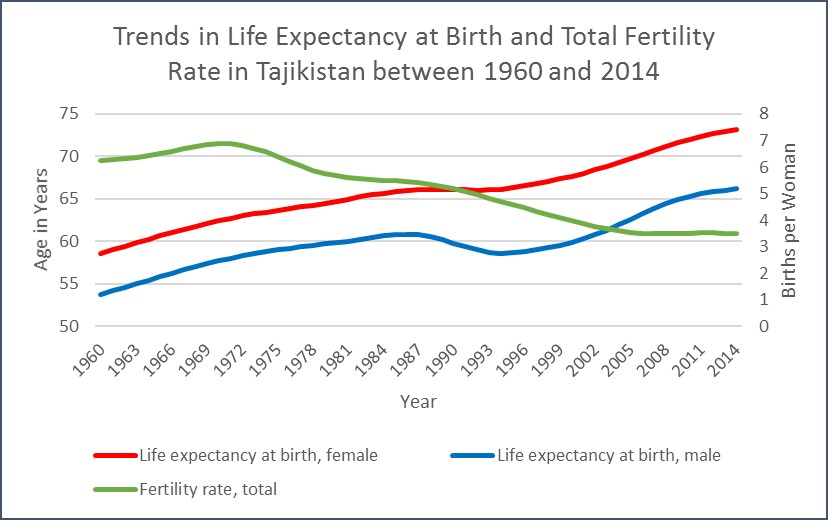
Figure shows the trends in life expectancy at birth (left axis) and total fertility rate (right axis) between 1960 and 2014.

In 1990, the leading cause of death were communicable diseases (predominantly diarrhea and lower respiratory infections). By 2013, the leading causes of death were non-communicable diseases (predominantly stroke and ischemic heart disease). The leading health risk factor in Tajikistan is dietary risks.

== Disability-adjusted life years ==
The top ranked causes of Disability Adjusted Life Years lost for Tajikistan citizens as of 2016 for all ages and sexes was diarrheal/lower respiratory infections/other (accounting for 5,421.22 DALYs per 100,000 population), 2nd cardiovascular disease (accounting for 3,943.96 DALYs per 100,000 population), 3rd neonatal disorders (accounting for 3,655.69 DALYs per 100,000 population), 4th other non-communicable (accounting for 2,556.68 DALYs per 100,000 population), and 5th unintentional injuries (accounting for 2,123.43 DALYs per 100,000 population). The global scale in 2016, cardiovascular disease ranked 1st, diarrheal/lower respiratory infections/other infections ranked 2nd neoplasm ranked 3rd, Other non- communicable diseases ranked 4th and neonatal disorders ranked 5th

== Child and maternal health ==
The Republic of Tajikistan has some of the highest child mortality rates in the Central Asia (Kazakhstan, Kyrgyzstan, Tajikistan, Turkmenistan, Uzbekistan) . The under-five mortality rate (Figure 1) in 2015 was 45 for every thousand live births and while, these reductions fell short of the Millennium Development Goals set for the region for 2015 there has been some progress made towards reducing child deaths. The number of under-five deaths in Tajikistan declined from 108 deaths per live birth in 1990 to 45 in 2015. The annual rate of reduction was 3.5%. Infant mortality rates have decreased from 85 deaths per 1,000 live births in 1990 to 39 in 2015 and the neonatal mortality rate decreased from 32 deaths per 1,000 live births to 21 in 2015 (Figure 2).

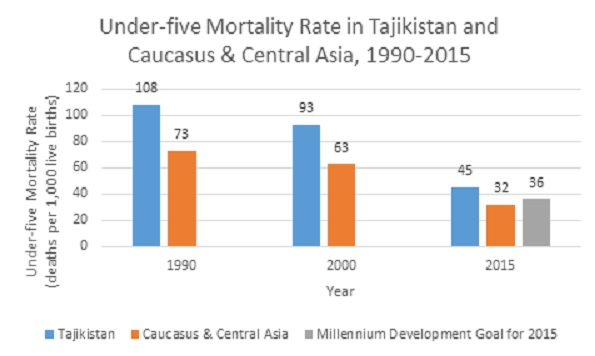
Figure 1: Under-five Mortality Rate in Tajikistan and Caucasus & Central Asia, 1990-2015 : United Nations Inter-Agency Group for Child Mortality Estimation. Levels & Trends in Child Mortality: Report 2015, http://www.unicef.org/media/files/IGME_Report_Final2.pdf. Accessed October 3, 2016

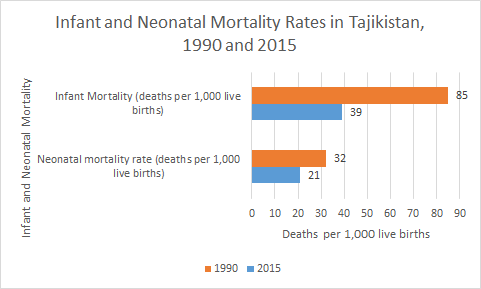
Figure 2: Infant and Neonatal Mortality Rates in Tajikistan, 1990 and 2015. Data Source: United Nations Inter-Agency Group for Child Mortality Estimation. Levels & Trends in Child Mortality: Report 2015. http://www.unicef.org/media/files/IGME_Report_Final2.pdf. Accessed October 3, 2016.

According to the World Health Organization, in Tajikistan, most child deaths are caused by diseases that are "readily preventable or treatable with proven, cost-effective and quality delivered interventions. Infectious diseases are responsible for the vast majority of under-five deaths globally." "In Tajikistan, over 40 percent of the population does not have access to clean water, and only 20 percent consume water from a central water supply system. Up to 60 percent of intestinal diseases in Tajikistan are water-borne, which accounts for 16 percent of deaths in children under 5 years of age. In 2010, Tajikistan experienced the first wild polio outbreak since 2002’.

In its Millennium Development Goals Progress Report: Tajikistan, the United Nations notes that maternal health is "one of the important areas of public health and is closely connected with the status of the family its material security living conditions, and family relationships. Official statistics from the Ministry of Health show that maternal mortality has decreased significantly, from more than 110 per 100,000 live births in 1995 to 44 in 2012.

In Tajikistan, only about 33 percent of women of reproductive age use modern contraceptive methods, and nearly one in five home deliveries are not attended by a skilled birth attendant. In Tajikistan, "maternal mortality is conditioned by poor quality of services in antenatal delivery and postnatal care the lack of a functioning referral system the lack of means of transport especially in rural areas, and inadequate access to emergency obstetric care (EOC). The leading factors are also regional disparities in human resource capacity, inadequate education and skills of health workers, combined with the lack of essential materials and equipment.

== Noncommunicable diseases ==
Although, mortality rates for non-communicable diseases (NCDs) are declining in the WHO European region, they are stagnating in Tajikistan. Tajikistan is currently not on target to meet the 2012 World Health Assembly’s target of a 25% reduction in premature death from NCDs by 2025 for member states.

According to the World Health Organization, NCDs are estimated to account for 62 percent of total deaths in Tajikistan. Cardiovascular disease is the leading cause of death and the largest contributor to the gap in mortality between central Asia and industrialized countries, with rates about five times higher than in western Europe. Cardiovascular diseases comprise 38% of all deaths in Tajikistan, compared to 8% for cancers, 4% for respiratory diseases, 1% for diabetes and 11% for other NCDs. From 1990 to 2013, the three leading causes of death from NCDs in Tajikistan have remained the same: ischemic heart disease, cerebrovascular disease, and COPD.

The main risk factors for NCD deaths in Tajikistan are dietary risks, high blood pressure and high body mass index. An estimated 40% of the population in Tajikistan is overweight and 9% is obese. The traditional diet in Tajikistan tends to be high in fat, salt, and sugar, and low in antioxidants.

== Other health conditions ==
=== Injuries ===
In 2012, injuries were responsible for 8% of deaths. The majority of injuries causing disability-adjusted life years (DALYs) were unintentional and related to road accidents. In 2013, State Automobile Inspectorate of Ministry of Internal Affairs, categorized deaths by road in Tajikistan to be 33% for pedestrians, 36% for passengers (all vehicles), 27% for drivers (all vehicles) and 4% for cyclists. Regarding intentional injuries, both homicides and self-harm rates have been dropping in Tajikistan since the 1990s. According to the UN Office on Drug and Crime, intentional homicides in Tajikistan dropped from over 8 per 100,000 people in 1996–1998 to less than 1.5 per 100,000 people in 2012–2013; for comparison, the average in lower middle income nations was 5.2 per 100,000 people in 2012. Since 1990, the annual mortality rate from self-harm and interpersonal violence in Tajikistan has decreased by 18.6% to 8.7 per 100,000 people; for comparison, the annual mortality rate from self-harm and interpersonal violence in nearby Kazakhstan was 50.7 per 100,000 people. Self-harm and interpersonal violence affects adolescent to middle-aged men in Tajikistan the most.

=== Mental health ===
Mental health remains a challenge in Tajikistan. The country did not have a stand-alone mental health policy or plan as of 2014, although some mental health legislation around instructions, rules and standards was adopted in 2002. In 2014, the prevalence of treated cases of severe mental disorder was 81.1 per 100,000 people, which does not reflect how many mental disorders may not be diagnosed and treated, and there were only 14.8 mental health workers per 100,000 people. Among types of mental health conditions, the leading contributors to disability-adjusted life years (DALYs) in 2012 were unipolar depressive disorders, followed by anxiety disorders and drug use disorders. Substance abuse is one of the major behavioral risk factors contributing to years lived with disabilities (YLDs).

=== Drug addiction ===
Since the late 1990s, the high volume of illegal narcotics trafficked through the country has caused a rapid increase in narcotics addiction, which has become a major health issue. In 2006, the number of addicts was estimated at between 60,000 and 100,000, two-thirds of whom are younger than 30 years of age. In 2013, the officially registered domestic consumption of drugs was relatively low at 7,470 addicts, but the UNODC and Red Cross estimate that up to 1.2% of the population or 100,000 people are regular opiates users. No substantial drug treatment programs are in place.

=== HIV/AIDS ===
Although reliable HIV statistics are not available, in 2005 the United Nations estimated that Tajikistan had approximately 5,000 people living with HIV/AIDS. Beginning in 2003, the incidence of new cases has increased more sharply each year. It is estimated that about 60 percent of HIV cases are drug-related. Since the late 1990s, HIV occurrence has increased rapidly in areas such as the autonomous province of Gorno–Badakhshan, where the flow of narcotics is heavy and poverty is endemic. The 2015 UNAIDS estimates are that Tajikistan has over 16,000 people living with HIV/AIDS, who are mostly adult men over age 15, and 6,000 orphans due to AIDS aged 0–17.

The first human immunodeficiency virus (HIV) case was registered in Tajikistan in 1991. According to the official statistics, as of January 1, 2016, there were 7,709 registered HIV cases in the country, 68.4% of which were among men. Most of the new HIV cases (87.1%) in 2015 were detected among adults (19 years of age and older), with 35.8% of all new HIV cases being attributable to those in 30–39 age group.

According to UNAIDS, 14,000 people are estimated to live with HIV in Tajikistan, with the HIV prevalence among adult population (15–49 years old) reaching 0.3%. In 2016, Tajikistan registered 1,300 new HIV infections. Since 2010, new HIV infections have increased by 23%. HIV epidemic is concentrated among key populations (KP): people who inject drugs (13.5% HIV prevalence), sex workers (3.5% HIV prevalence), men who have sex with men (MSM, HIV prevalence of 2%). However, there are signs of a shift of the epidemic to the general population. It is estimated that around 60% of people living with HIV are undiagnosed. Although same-sex route of HIV transmission is not reported from Tajikistan, there are assumptions that male-to-male transmissions are being reported as "heterosexual" or "unknown", as homosexuality is highly stigmatized in Tajikistan. The recently reported increase in sexual transmission among men could point to the hidden nature of MSM epidemic in Tajikistan.

Since the collapse of the Soviet Union, Tajikistan has had a rapid and significant rise in seasonal migration, affecting all aspects of Tajik society. The majority of Tajik labor migrants travel for work to Russian Federation. It is believed, that up to 2,000,000 Tajik citizens live and work abroad, primarily in Russian Federation. Such levels of migration to Russia (high prevalence country) may result in increased numbers of HIV in Tajikistan.

The population size estimate (PSE) of MSM in Tajikistan points at 13,400. HIV prevalence among MSM is 2% and it remained unchanged in the recent years. According to the most recent integrated biobehavioral survey (IBBS) among MSM (2017), sexual behavior of MSM bears significant risks for acquiring HIV and other STIs. Overall, 79% of respondents reported using condom during the last anal sexual intercourse and 16% of MSM mentioned having symptoms of STIs during the last year. Coverage of MSM with HIV testing remains low: only 39% of MSM reported having an HIV test within the last 12 months and having received the result.

Over the past 13 years, HIV prevention work has been implemented in Tajikistan with the support of GFATM; funding has also been available from US government and UN agencies. Prevention work is implemented with the involvement of civil society and NGOs. HIV prevention services, as well as care and support are accessible through the network of NGOs and at local AIDS centers. Provision of condoms and distribution of information materials were the services most frequently reported by MSM. Overall, 89% IBBS respondents mentioned receiving condoms within the last 12 months and knowing where to get an HIV test. The country concept note for 2018–2020 GFATM funding envisaged financial allocations to civil society organizations for increasing access and engagement of KPs in seeking prevention packages, linkage to care, adherence to treatment, decreasing stigma and discrimination, providing legal support services, etc. However, MSM are not defined as a key population in the National Program to Fight the Human Immunodeficiency Virus Epidemic in the Republic of Tajikistan for 2017–2020.

=== Famine and malnutrition ===
Tajikistan faces significant challenges in nutrition and food security, as outlined in the UN's 2024 Food Security and Nutrition Outlook for Europe and Central Asia. Chronic malnutrition continues to affect the country, with 13.1% of children under five suffering from stunting in 2022, and 9.9% from wasting, well above global targets. At the same time, childhood obesity has surged, with overweight children rising from 4.6% in 2000 to 21% in 2022. Agriculture, vital to the economy, is increasingly vulnerable to climate change and water scarcity. Despite reforms like the 2020 Water Code and planned watershed management by 2026, water management remains a critical issue. Additionally, women in agriculture face significant gender disparities, working largely informally without protections. These issues are compounded by broader regional challenges, such as food insecurity and rising obesity, urging the UN to advocate for integrated solutions addressing nutrition, climate adaptation, and water governance.
