= Khujand State University =

University in Khujand, Tajikistan

Khujand State University (Russian: Худжандский государственный университет; Tajik: Донишгоҳи Давлатии Хуҷанд) - was founded in 1932 in Khujand (formerly Leninabad), Tajikistan. First it was known as a High Pedagogical Institute. During the Soviet era, Khujand State University was known as Leninabad State Pedagogical Institute. Leninabad State Pedagogical Institute was renamed to Khujand State University after Tajikistan gained Independence from the USSR. This university is named after Tajik academician Bobojon Gafurov. Alumni include politician Khayrinisso Yusufi.

Today the University has seven educational buildings with a total education area of 42.514.06 m2. There are 337 auditoriums and 36 staff rooms for teachers, 180 specialized auditoriums, 39 computer classes, 6 dormitories; 320 computers think line, 100 notebooks, 17 educational laboratories, a library, and some departments at the faculties, an agro-biological garden/base, where 964 workers are employed, 59 electronic boards, 207 projectors, 3 service computers, General Internal connection of the faculties, 66,000 books of numeral libraries. KSU employs 1697 people: 847 of them professors and teachers, 2 are the members-correspondents of Academy of Sciences of the Republic of Tajikistan, 47 are doctors of science, and 335 are candidates of science. Today, KSU is the second university in the Republic after the Tajik State National University in regards to the capacity of teaching force and the number of the students. At present the University contains 15 faculties, 70 Chairs, five research centers and Pedagogical College. The number of the students reached over 19,000.

The University has close ties with a number of national and international organization, including SOROS, GIZ, ACCELS, EUROASIA, CARANA CORPORATION, OSCE, ERASMUS MUNDUS, TEMPUS, ERASMUS PLUS, UNESCO, USAID, DAAD, Aga-Khan, etc. KSU intends to be a globally-connected university by developing its bilateral relations with advanced world-wide universities. As well the University cooperates with many International Organizations.

== History ==
Khujand State University was founded in 1932 in Khujand (Leninabad)

== Faculties ==
Khujand State University has 16 faculties:

1. Mathematics
2. Geo-Ecology
3. Philology
4. Tajik Philology
5. Physics and Technology
6. Foreign Languages
7. Oriental Languages
8. Part-time studies
9. Physical Training
10. Telecommunications and IT
11. Finance and Market Economy
12. Pedagogy
13. Drawing Arts and Technology
14. The Arts
15. History and Law
16. Chemistry and Biology

== Gallery ==
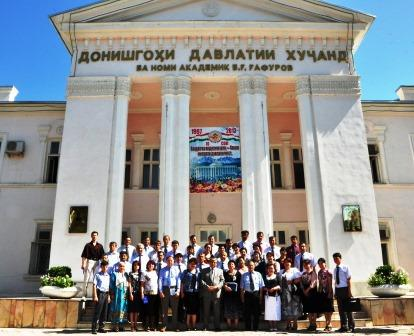

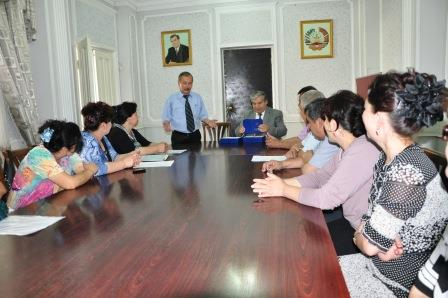

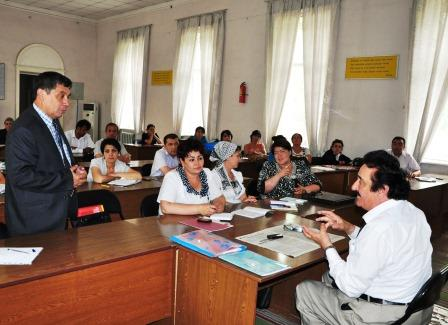

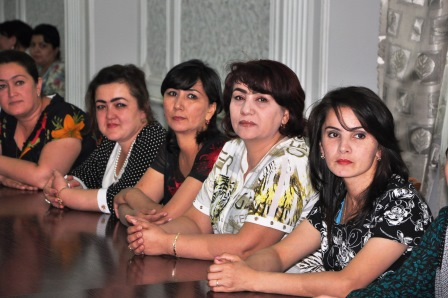
