= List of cities in Tajikistan =

Map of Tajikistan

This is a list of cities in Tajikistan.

The largest metropolitan area in Tajikistan is that of the capital Dushanbe, with 1,563,400 inhabitants (2024 est.). Thirteen percent of the population of the country lives in the region of the capital.

== Cities of more than 10,000 people, listed by population ==
The following table includes all cities larger than 10,000 people, with their names in English, and the corresponding names in Cyrillic and Perso-Arabic script. Because of transliteration difficulties, some are known by more than one spelling. The population is from the censuses of 12 January 1989, 20 January 2000 and 21 September 2010, as well as estimates for 1 January 2015 and 2020. The population figures are for the city proper, and do not include adjacent communities. In addition, the administrative division in which the city lies is named, usually a region, or an autonomous region in the case of Gorno-Badakhshan Autonomous Region (GBAR). There is also the capital district, and the Districts under Central Government Jurisdiction (Nohiyahoi tobei jumhuri, here abbreviated NTJ), which do not belong to a region, and are directly under the central government. Finally, the district in which the city lies is given.

Largest cities of Tajikistan

Dushanbe

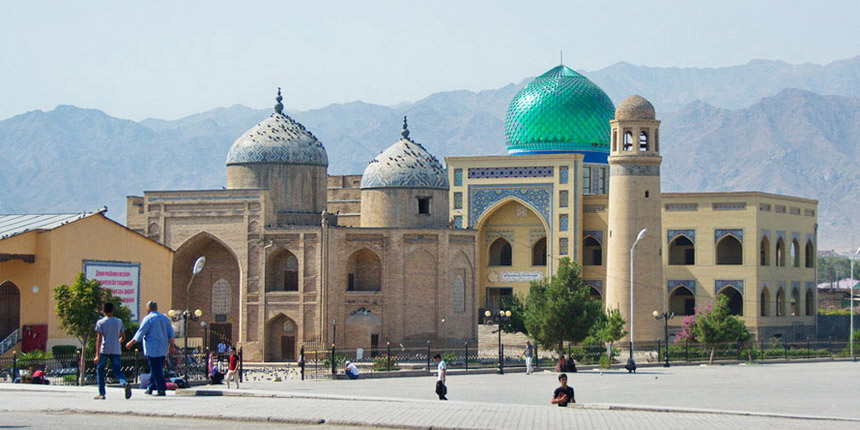
Khujand

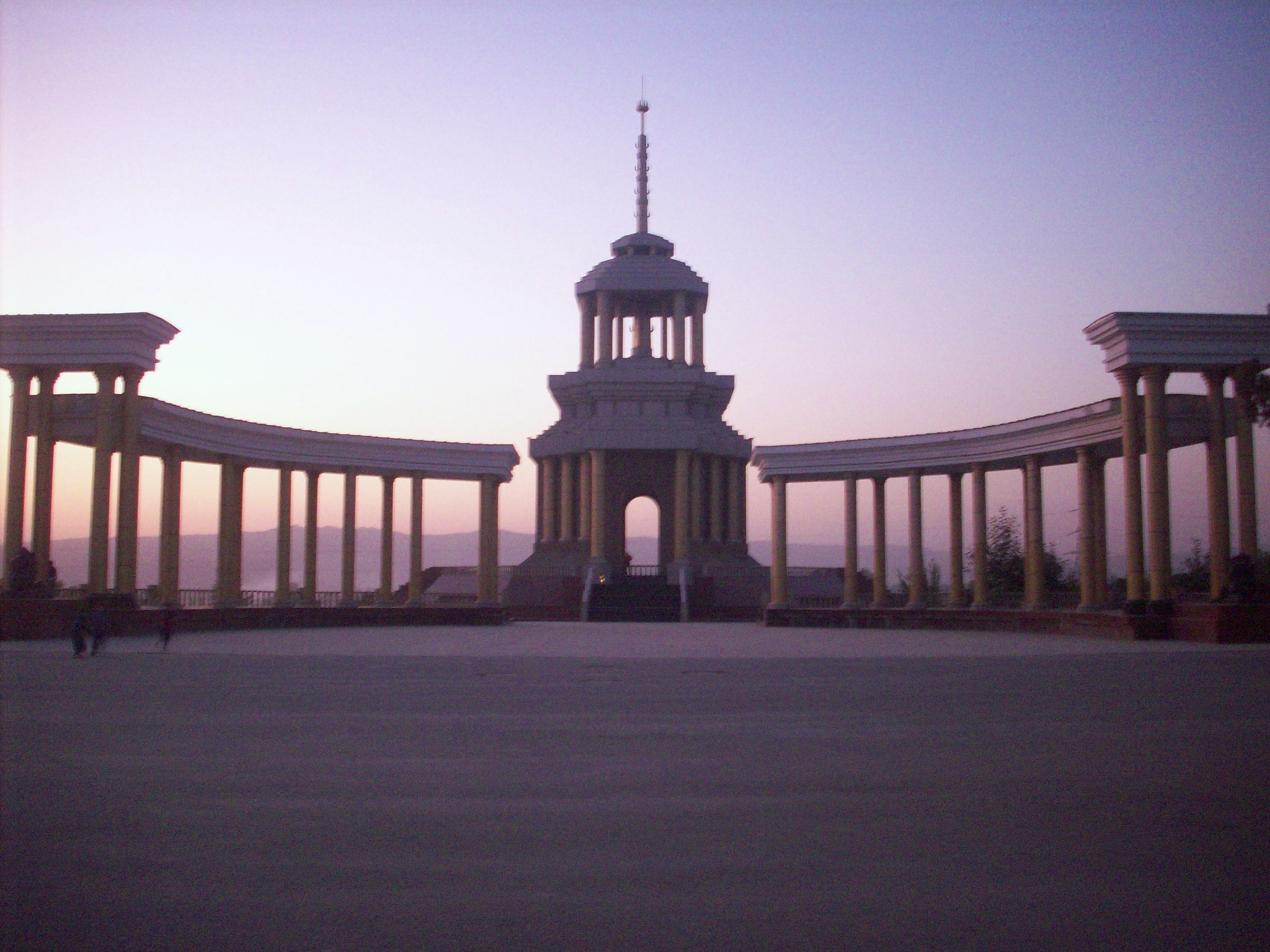
Kulob

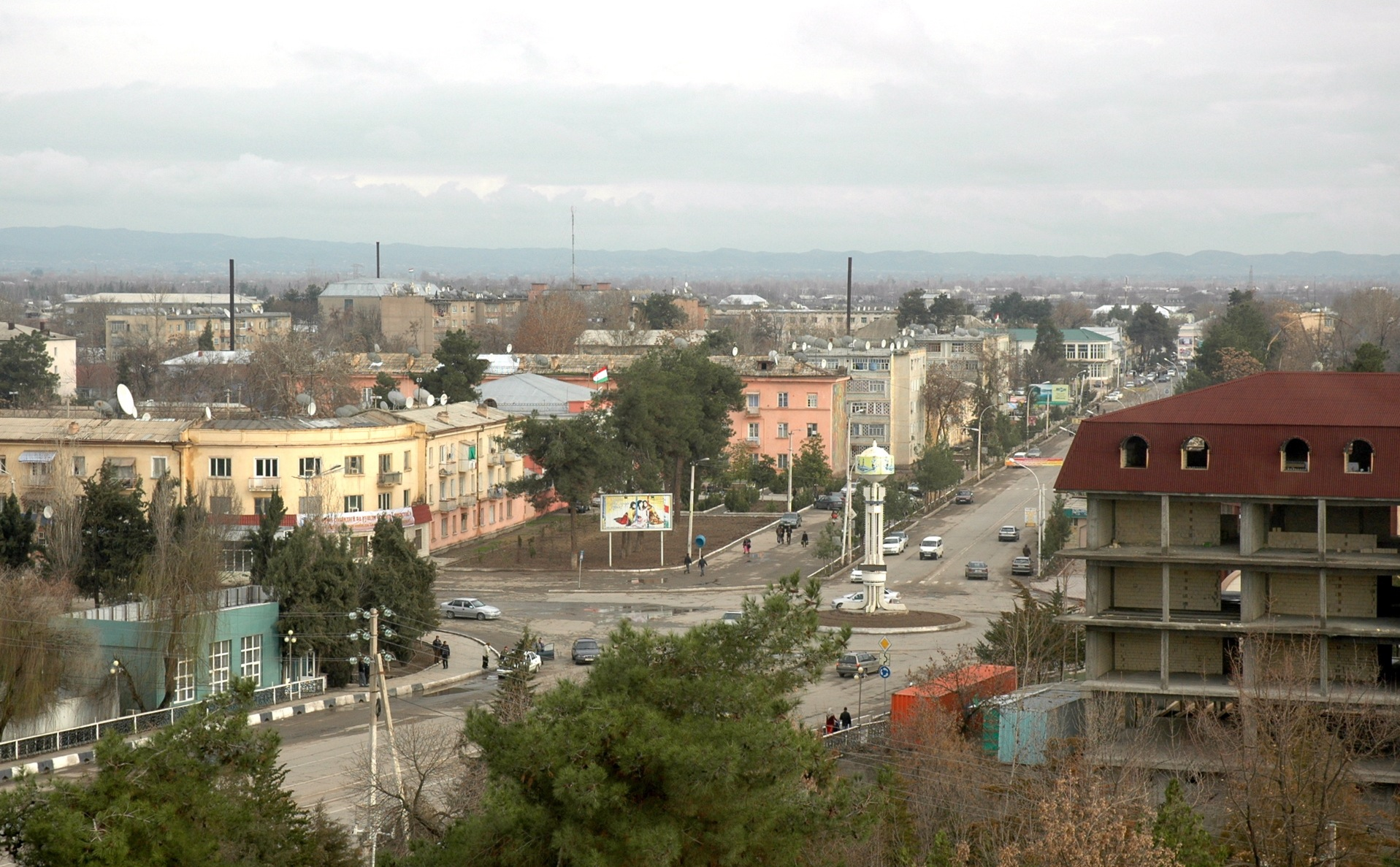
Bokhtar

Rank	Name	Tajik Cyrillic	Tajik Persian	1989 census	2000 census	2010 census	2015 estimate	2020 estimate	Administrative division	District
1.	Dushanbe^{1}*	Душанбе	دوشنبه	595,820	561,895	724,800	788,700	863,400	Dushanbe	Capital district
2.	Khujand^{2}	Хуҷанд	خجند	160,458	147,061	162,800	172,700	183,600	Sughd	Khujand**
3.	Bokhtar (Qurghonteppa)	Бохтар	باختر قرغان‌تپه	58,505	60,508	75,500	102,900	111,800	Khatlon	Bokhtar**
4.	Kulob	Кӯлоб	کولاب	74,456	77,692	95,000	101,200	106,300	Khatlon	Kulob**
5.	Istaravshan	Истаравшан	استروشن	45,763	50,369	54,700	59,900	65,600	Sughd	Istaravshan**
6.	Tursunzoda	Турсунзoдa	تورسون‌زاده	40,593	37,794	46,700	52,400	55,700	NTJ	Tursunzoda*
7.	Konibodom	Конибодом	کان بادام	37,841	44,691	46,500	49,700	52,500	Sughd	Konibodom**
8.	Isfara	Исфара	اسفره	34,524	36,850	42,900	46,900	51,700	Sughd	Isfara**
9.	Panjakent	Панҷакент	پنج‌کنت	27,903	32,572	38,500	40,600	43,300	Sughd	Panjakent**
10.	Vahdat	Ваҳдат	وحدت	45,731	44,691	40,600	42,200	43,200	NTJ	Vahdat*
11.	Yovon	Ёвон	یاوان	20,148	20,000	29,400	33,200	36,700	Khatlon	Yovon District
12.	Buston	Бустон	چکلاو	33,731	22,000	26,000	29,800	34,000	Sughd	Buston**
13.	Norak	Нoрaк	نورک	20,752	19,256	24,800	28,100	31,400	Khatlon	Norak**
14.	Danghara	Данғара	دنغره	16,898	18,167	22,700	25,000	31,100	Khatlon	Danghara District
15.	Khorugh	Хоруғ	خاروغ	20,318	27,421	28,100	28,900	30,500	GBAR	Khorugh**
16.	Hisor	Ҳисор	حصار	20,220	20,000	24,400	26,900	29,100	NTJ	Hisor**
17.	Farkhor	Фархoр	فرخار	17,915	19,486	21,500	22,900	25,300	Khatlon	Farkhor District
18.	Somoniyon	Сомониён	سامانیان	16,623	n/a	20,100	22,600	25,200	NTJ	Rudaki District
19.	Hulbuk	Ҳулбук	واسع	14,989	19,421	20,600	22,700	24,500	Khatlon	Vose' District
20.	Moskovskiy	Маскав	ماسکوا	16,756	18,074	21,300	22,500	23,300	Khatlon	Hamadoni District
21.	Ghafurov	Бобоҷон Ғафуров	باباجان غفوروف	18,916	14,887	16,900	18,400	20,600	Sughd	Ghafurov District
22.	Zafarobod	Зафаробод	ظفرآباد	11,191	n/a	14,800	17,200	20,600	Sughd	Zafarobod District
23.	Mirzo Tursunzoda	Мирзо Турсунзода	میرزا تورسن‌زاده	n/a	n/a	15,700	17,900	20,500	NTJ	Rudaki District
24.	Balkh	Балх	بلخ	13,354	n/a	15,500	17,500	19,000	Khatlon	J. Balkhi District
25.	Dusti	Дустӣ	دوستی	8,886	10,460	14,500	16,500	18,800	Khatlon	Jayhun District
26.	Navkat	Навкат	ناو	13,863	12,964	15,100	16,900	18,700	Sughd	Spitamen District
27.	Shaydon	Шайдон	اشت	9,605	11,039	13,200	15,300	18,200	Sughd	Asht District
28.	Guliston	Гулистон	گلستان	12,819	10,000	14,300	15,100	18,000	Sughd	Guliston**
29.	Levakant	Левакант	سربند	14,006	10,874	14,200	15,800	17,700	Khatlon	Levakant**
30.	Istiqlol	Истиқлол	تباشر	20,166	12,237	14,200	15,900	17,600	Sughd	Istiqlol**
31.	Shahritus	Шаҳритус	شهر توز	11,618	11,857	14,700	15,800	17,200	Khatlon	Shahrituz District
32.	Ghonchi	Ғончӣ		7,383	8,292	9,600	11,800	17,000	Sughd	Devashtich District
33.	Mehrobod	Мехробод	مهرآباد	15,104	12,658	13,300	14,800	16,600	Sughd	J. Rasulov District
34.	Adrasmon	Адрасмoн	ادرسمان	11,298	n/a	13,500	14,600	15,800	Sughd	Guliston**
35.	Buston	Бӯстон	بوستان	12,178	n/a	12,100	13,600	15,500	Sughd	Mastchoh District
36.	Vakhsh	Вахш	وخش	10,587	n/a	13,000	14,100	14,900	Khatlon	Vakhsh District
37.	Roghun	Роғун	راغون	8,457	7,934	13,800	15,000	14,900	NTJ	Roghun*
38.	Sharora	Шарора	شراره	5,154	9,000	11,400	12,700	14,300	NTJ	Hisor*
39.	Mu'minobod	Мӯъминобод	مؤمن‌آباد	9,764	11,208	12,200	13,000	14,100	Khatlon	Mu'minobod District
40.	Abdurahmoni Jomi	Абдураҳмони Ҷомӣ	عبدالرحمن جامی	9,704	9,132	11,500	12,700	13,800	Khatlon	Jomi District
41.	Panj	Панҷ	پنج	9,277	7,967	10,400	11,700	12,500	Khatlon	Panj District
42.	Mehnatobod	Меҳнатобод	محنت‌آباد	7,191	n/a	9,300	10,800	12,400	Sughd	Zafarobod District
43.	Nu'mon Roziq	Нуъмон Розиқ	نعمان رازق	n/a	n/a	10,700	11,600	12,400	NTJ	Vahdat*
44.	Obikiik	Обикиик		n/a	n/a	6,600	8,500	12,300	Khatlon	Khuroson District
45.	Qubodiyon	Қубодиён	قبادیان	n/a	n/a	5,200	n/a	12,200	Khatlon	Qubodiyon District
46.	Homid Aliev	Ҳомид Алиев	حامد علیف	5,890	n/a	9,000	10,000	11,400	Sughd	Zafarobod District
47.	Sovet	Совет		7,535	7,834	9,000	9,900	10,800	Khatlon	Temurmalik District
48.	Fayzobod	Файзобод	فیض‌آباد	n/a	n/a	8,700	9,400	10,400	NTJ	Fayzobod District
49.	Navobod	Навобод		5,945	n/a	8,200	9,100	10,200	NTJ	Rudaki District

^{1}: Name from 1929 to 1961: Stalinabad
^{2}: Name from 1939 to 1992: Leninabad
*Cities under central government jurisdiction
**Cities under regional jurisdiction

== See also ==
- List of renamed cities in Tajikistan
- List of towns and villages in Tajikistan
