= List of hospitals in Tajikistan =

Hospital Istiqlol in Dushanbe

The following is a list of hospitals in Tajikistan that includes the name, location and references. Tajikistan government sources indicate that there were 325 hospitals in Tajikistan in 1986. By 2007, the number of hospitals had grown to 426, according to the World Health Organization.

== Notable hospitals ==
Hospitals in Tajikistan
Name	City/Coordinate	Region	References
Central District Hospital Jaloliddin Balkhi	Balkh, Jaloliddin Balkhi District	Khatlon Region	
Central District Hospital Jayhun	Jayhun District	Khatlon Region	
Central District Hospital Konibodom	Konibodom; 40.278426°N 70.430960°E	Sughd Region	
Central District Hospital Qubodiyon	Qubodiyon District	Khatlon Region	
Isfara District Central Hospital	Isfara; 40.116697°N 70.621493°E	Sughd Region	
Istaravshan District Central Hospital	Istaravshan	Sughd Region	
Central District Hospital Lakhsh	Lakhsh District (village)	Districts of Republican Subordination	
Central District Hospital Zafarobod	Zafarobod (village), Zafarabad District	Sughd Region	
Central District Hospital Dusti	Dusti (Dusti District); 37.487027°N 68.529606°E	Khatlon Region	
Central Hospital Danghara	Danghara (village); 38.101052°N 69.334662°E	Khatlon Region	
Central Hospital of Kulob	Kulob	Khatlon Region	
Central Hospital of Bokhtar	Bokhtar (formerly Qurghonteppa Oblast)	Khatlon Region	
Central Hospital Guliston	Kayrakkum Reservoir (near)	Sughd Region	
Central District Hospital Mu'minobod	Mu'minobod (village)	Khatlon Region	
Mastcho District Central Hospital	Mastchoh District (Matcha); 40.368056°N 69.325278°E	Sughd Region	
Indotaj Medical Centre	Dushanbe		https://indotaj.com/
Central District Hospital of Spitamen	Navkat (village of Spitamen)	Sughd Region	
Nurobad District Central Hospital	Nurobad District (village of Darband)	Districts of Republican Subordination	
Central District Hospital Pharkhor	Farkhar	Khatlon Region	
Central Hospital Nurak	Nurak	Khatlon Region	
Central Hospital Panjakent	Panjakent	Sughd Region	
Panj District Central Hospital	Panj District	Khatlon Region	
Central District Hospital named after A. Jami	Abdurrahman Jami area	Khatlon Region	
Central District Hospital named after B. Ghafurov	Bokhtar (B. Gafurov Area)	Khatlon Region	
Republican Ophthalmologic Center	238 R. Nabiyev St.	Dushanbe	
Children's Surgical Hospital	4 Gorky St.	Dushanbe	
Children's TB Hospital	45 Azizbayev St.	Dushanbe	
Children's Regional Hospital	Khujand	Sughd Region	
Children's Hospital №2	133 Rudaki Ave. 38.600553°N 68.786883°E	Dushanbe	
Children's Hospital of Infectious Diseases	20 Sheroz St.38.570937°N 68.781390°E	Dushanbe	
City Clinical Hospital №1	Abay St. 38.539551°N 68.752286°E	Dushanbe	
City Clinical Hospital №2	33 Sano St.	Dushanbe	
City Clinical Hospital №3	3 and 6 Akademik Rajabovho St.	Dushanbe	
City Hospital №2	Khujand; 40.265729°N 69.642123°E	Sughd Region	
City Clinical Hospital S. Urunova (№1)	Khujand, S. Urunova, 147a Gagarina St.40.274275°N 69.644526°E	Sughd Region	
Khorugh General Hospital	Khorog	Gorno-Badakhshan Autonomous Region	
Leninski Mental Hospital		Dushanbe	
International Ibn Sina Clinic	38.581548°N 68.782413°E	Dushanbe	
Aga Khan Health Service	Khorog; 37.489990°N 71.583059°E	Gorno-Badakhshan Autonomous Region	
Prospekt Medical Clinic		Dushanbe	
Nurafzo Diagnostic Centre		Dushanbe	
Ananda SPA and Vendanta Medical Centre	38.587086°N 68.796899°E	Dushanbe	
Hospital Istiqlol	61 Karabaev Ave. 38.536056°N 68.764395°E	Dushanbe	
Central Military Hospital of the Ministry of Defense	Dushanbe, 40 Years of Victory 1; 38.537478°N 68.766963°E	Dushanbe	
Maternity Hospital № 1 (formerly № 3)	Mirzo Tursunzoda Street; 38.581905°N 68.732939°E	Dushanbe	

== See also ==
- Health in Tajikistan
- Districts of Tajikistan
- Regions of Tajikistan
- Avicenna Tajik State Medical University
