= Korez =

- Village and Jamoat
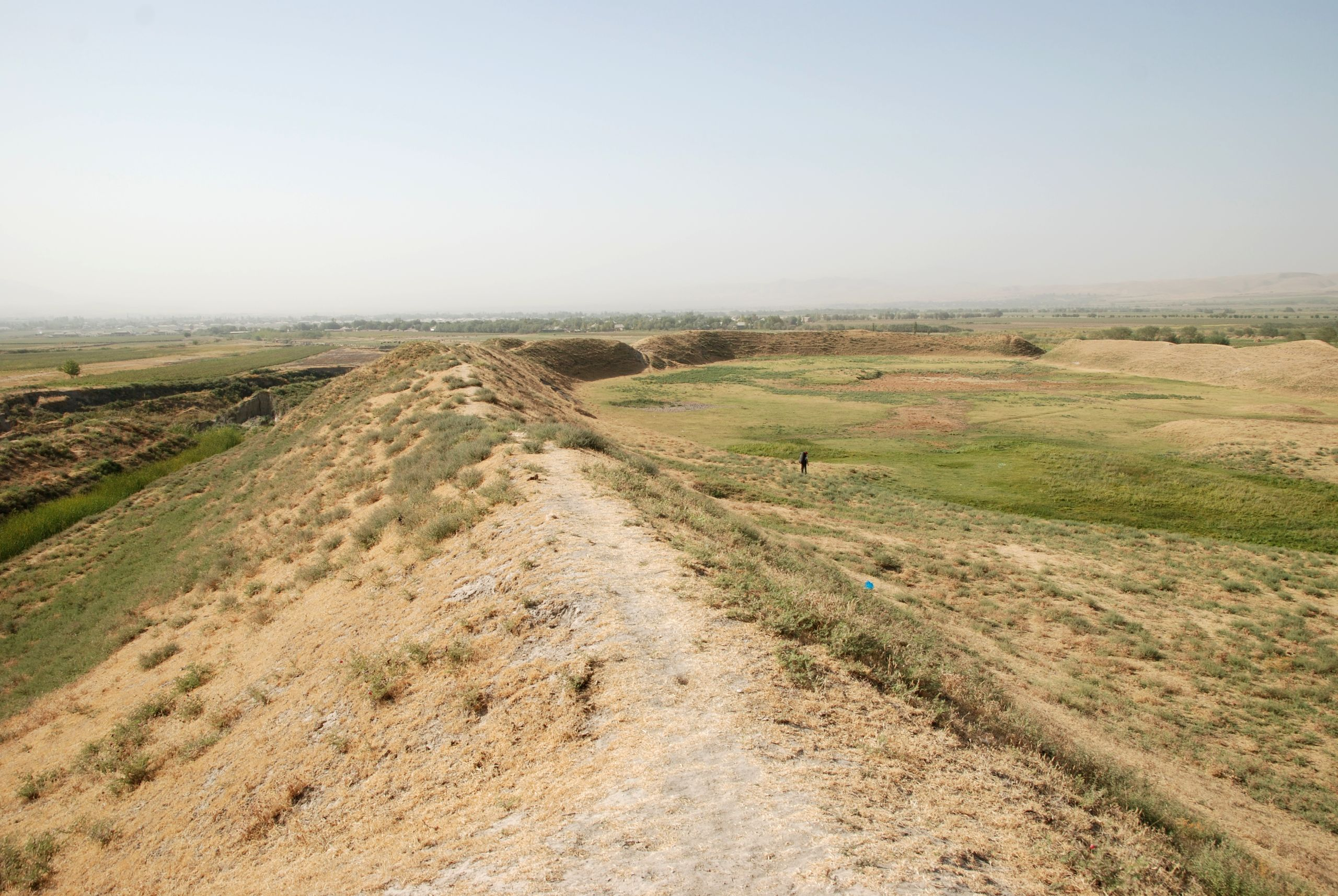
- Zoli-Zard near Korez, 4 km north of Danghara

- Location within Tajikistan
- Coordinates: 38.1286°N 69.3269°E
- Country: Tajikistan
- Region: Khatlon
- District: Danghara District

Population (2015)
  - Total: 15,027
- Time zone: UTC+5 (TJT)

Korez (Tajik: Корез, Persian: کاریز) is a village and jamoat in Tajikistan. It is located in Danghara District in Khatlon Region. The jamoat has a total population of 15,027 (2015).
