= Ubaidullo Qurbon =

Tajik surgeon and university rector (born 1961)

- Убайдулло Абдулло Қурбон
- Born: 20 December 1961 (age 64); Danghara District, Tajik SSR, Soviet Union
- Other name: Ubaidullo Abdulloevich Kurbanov
- Alma mater: Tajik State Medical Institute (1984)
- Known for: Development of microsurgery and reconstructive surgery in Tajikistan
- Awards: Avicenna State Prize of Tajikistan (2013)
- Scientific career
- Fields: Surgery, microsurgery, reconstructive and plastic surgery
- Workplaces: Avicenna Tajik State Medical University (rector, 2005–2016); Khatlon State Medical University (rector, since 2016)
- Doctoral advisor: N. U. Usmanov

Ubaidullo Abdullo Qurbon (Tajik: Убайдулло Абдулло Қурбон; also known as Ubaidullo Abdulloevich Kurbanov; born 20 December 1961) is a Tajik surgeon specialising in microsurgery and reconstructive surgery, and a university administrator. He was rector of Avicenna Tajik State Medical University from 2005 to 2016 and has been rector of Khatlon State Medical University since 2016. From 2010 to 2015 he was a member of the National Assembly, the upper house of the Supreme Assembly of Tajikistan.

== Early life and education ==
Qurbon was born on 20 December 1961 in Danghara District. In 1978 he entered the medical faculty of the Tajik State Medical Institute (now Avicenna Tajik State Medical University), graduating with honours in 1984. He completed a clinical residency in surgery in Dushanbe in 1986 and then trained in microsurgery at the All-Union Scientific Centre of Surgery in Moscow.

== Medical career ==
From 1986 to 1992 Qurbon worked as a surgeon at Dushanbe City Clinical Hospital No. 5. From 1992 he worked at the Republican Scientific Centre for Cardiovascular and Thoracic Surgery, where in 1997 he became head of the newly established department of reconstructive and plastic microsurgery, and in 2004 deputy director for clinical work. He received further training in Leningrad, Frankfurt am Main and Giessen (Germany) and Salzburg (Austria), and was a DAAD scholar in 1996.

He is regarded as one of the pioneers of reconstructive microsurgery and plastic surgery in Tajikistan. His research concerns the replantation of fingers, hands and larger limb segments, microsurgical transfer of revascularised tissue flaps, and the use of microsurgical techniques in other surgical fields.

== Academic career ==
Qurbon defended his candidate dissertation on finger replantation in 1994 and his doctoral dissertation on the replantation of traumatically amputated upper-limb segments in 2004. He received the title of professor in 2008. In 2014 he was elected a corresponding member of the National Academy of Sciences of Tajikistan.

According to the Higher Attestation Commission of Tajikistan, he has authored 24 monographs and textbooks, 231 scientific and popular articles, 345 conference abstracts, 21 patents and 96 innovation proposals, and has supervised 15 candidate and doctoral dissertations.

=== University leadership ===
By a government resolution of 23 August 2005 Qurbon was appointed rector of Avicenna Tajik State Medical University, a post he held until February 2016. From 2006 to 2016 he was also editor-in-chief of the university journal Avicenna Bulletin (Vestnik Avitsenny).

In 2016 he led the working group that prepared the project for a new medical university in Khatlon Region, and by Government Resolution No. 80 of 25 February 2016 he was appointed the first rector of Khatlon State Medical University in Danghara. Under his leadership the university grew from 353 students in 2016 to 3,367 in 2026.

Since February 2024 he has been a member of the presidium of the Higher Attestation Commission under the President of Tajikistan.

== Political career ==
From 2010 to 2015 Qurbon was a member of the National Assembly of Tajikistan and chaired its Committee on Social Affairs, Health, Science, Education, Culture and Youth and Women's Policy. In 2014 the CIS Interparliamentary Assembly awarded him its medal "For Strengthening Parliamentary Cooperation".

== Awards ==
- Prize of the Lenin Komsomol of Tajikistan (1988)
- Excellence in Health Care of Tajikistan (2009)
- Avicenna State Prize of the Republic of Tajikistan in Science and Technology (2013)
- Medal "For Strengthening Parliamentary Cooperation" (CIS Interparliamentary Assembly, 2014)
