= Ravshan =

Ravshan Равшан
- Jamoat
- Location in Tajikistan
- Coordinates: 40°08′N 68°40′E
- Country: Tajikistan
- Region: Sughd Region
- District: Zafarobod District

Population (2020)
  - Total: 16,363
- Time zone: UTC+5 (TJT)
- Official languages: Russian (Interethnic); Tajik (State) (Note: Constitution of Tajikistan)

Ravshan (Tajik: Равшан) is a jamoat in north-western Tajikistan. It is located in Zafarobod District in Sughd Region. The jamoat has a total population of 16,363 (2015).
