= Norin, Tajikistan =

Norin
- Jamoat
- Location within Tajikistan
- Coordinates: 38°12′N 68°54′E
- Country: Tajikistan
- Region: Khatlon
- District: Yovon District

Population (2015)
  - Total: 21,314
- Time zone: UTC+5 (TJT)

Norin (Tajik: Норин, Persian: نارین) is a jamoat in Tajikistan. It is located in Yovon District in Khatlon Region. The jamoat has a total population of 21,314 (2015).
