= Jomi =

Jomi Ҷомӣ جومي
- Village and Jamoat
- Location in Tajikistan
- Coordinates: 40°11′N 69°05′E
- Country: Tajikistan
- Region: Sughd Region
- District: Zafarobod District

Population (2020)
  - Total: 7,264
- Time zone: UTC+5 (TJT)

Location of Zafarobod District in Tajikistan.

Jomi (Tajik: Ҷомӣ) is a village and jamoat in north-western Tajikistan. It is located in Zafarobod District in Sughd Region. The jamoat has a total population of 7,264 (2020).
