= Abdurahmoni Jomi =

Abdurahmoni Jomi Russian: Абдурахмана Джами Tajik: Абдураҳмони Ҷомӣ
- Location in Tajikistan
- Coordinates: 37°56′45″N 68°48′42″E
- Country: Tajikistan
- Region: Khatlon Region
- District: Jomi District

Population (2020)
  - Total: 18,800
- Official languages: Russian (Interethnic); Tajik (State)

Abdurahmoni Jomi (Russian: Абдурахмана Джами; Tajik: Абдураҳмони Ҷомӣ, before 2012: Kuybyshevsk) is a town in south-west Tajikistan. It is the administrative capital of Jomi District in Khatlon Region, located just north of the regional capital Qurghonteppa and about 100 km south of the national capital Dushanbe. Its population is 13,800 (January 2020 estimate). Both the town and the district were named after the Persian poet Jami.

== See also ==
- List of cities in Tajikistan
