= Molotovabad =

Molotovabad may refer to:

- Molotovabad, Kyrgyzstan, Soviet name of Uch-Korgon, Kyrgyzstan
- Molotovabad, Tajikistan, Soviet name of Dusti, Tajikistan
