= Sebiston =

- Village and Jamoat
- Location within Tajikistan
- Coordinates: 38°15′N 69°17′E
- Country: Tajikistan
- Region: Khatlon
- District: Danghara District

Population (2015)
  - Total: 12,736
- Time zone: UTC+5 (TJT)
- Official languages: Russian (Interethnic); Tajik (State) (Note: Constitution of Tajikistan)

Sebiston (Russian and Tajik: Себистон, Persian: سیبستان) is a village and jamoat in Tajikistan. It is located in Danghara District in Khatlon Region. The jamoat has a total population of 12,736 (2015).
