= Madina Nizomova =

Madina Nizomova is a women's rights advocate from Tajikistan.

== Biography ==
Nizomova is the director of Ghamkhori, a shelter for women survivors of domestic abuse, located in Bokhtar in the south of Tajikistan. In 2017 she joined a delegation of Tajik women to Minneapolis to discuss and share anti-terror strategies.
