= Lolazor, Danghara District =

Lolazor
- Jamoat
- Location within Tajikistan
- Coordinates: 37°59′N 69°19′E
- Country: Tajikistan
- Region: Khatlon
- District: Danghara District

Population (2015)
  - Total: 18,285
- Time zone: UTC+5 (TJT)

Lolazor (Persian: لاله‌زار) is a jamoat in Tajikistan. It is located in Danghara District in Khatlon Region. The jamoat has a total population of 18,285 (2015).
