= Safobakhsh =

Safobakhsh Сафобахш
- Jamoat
- Location within Tajikistan
- Coordinates: 38°09′N 69°18′E
- Country: Tajikistan
- Region: Khatlon
- District: Danghara District

Population (2015)
  - Total: 20,119
- Time zone: UTC+5 (TJT)
- Official languages: Russian (Interethnic); Tajik (State) (Note: Constitution of Tajikistan)

Safobakhsh (formerly Oqsu; Tajik: Сафобахш) is a jamoat in Tajikistan. It is located in Danghara District in Khatlon Region. The jamoat has a total population of 20,119 (2015).

== See also ==
- 2018 Tajikistan tourist attack
