= Sharipov, Danghara District =

Sharipov Шарипов (Russian and Tajik)
- Jamoat
- Location within Tajikistan
- Coordinates: 38°03′N 69°26′E
- Country: Tajikistan
- Region: Khatlon
- District: Danghara District

Population (2015)
  - Total: 20,452
- Time zone: UTC+5 (TJT)
- Official languages: Russian (Interethnic); Tajik (State)

Sharipov (Russian: Шарипов; Tajik: Исмат Шарипов Ismat Sharipov, Persian: شریپاو) is a town and jamoat in Tajikistan. It is located in Danghara District in Khatlon Region. The jamoat has a total population of 20,452 (2015).
