= Lohur =

Lohur may refer to one of two locations in Tajikistan:

- Lohur, Danghara District, a jamoat in Khatlon Province, Tajikistan
- Lohur, Rudaki District, a jamoat in Districts of Republican Subordination Province, Tajikistan
