= 2018 Tajikistan tourist attack =

2018 terror attack in Tajikistan

- Location: Danghara district, Tajikistan
- Date: July 29, 2018
- Target: Western cyclists
- Weapons: Vehicle-ramming attack, stabbing
- Deaths: 4
- Injuries: 2
- Perpetrator: Islamic State
- Assailant: 5
- Motive: Islamic extremism

On July 29, 2018 (UTC+05:00), four touring cyclists were killed while cycling in the Danghara District, and two more were injured after five IS members rammed them with a car and then got out of the vehicle and stabbed them.

== Background ==
Terrorist movements are known to be present in Central Asia; Afghanistan, with which Tajikistan shares a long border, has been affected by decades of Islamist murderous attacks. However, terrorist attacks have been infrequent in Tajikistan, mostly targeting the government agencies.

The country is popular with touring cyclists because of its scenic mountain roads like the Pamir Highway.

Jay Austin, one of the victims of the attack, wrote of his experiences while performing a world-wide cycling tour that ended in Tajikistan:

You read the papers and you’re led to believe that the world is a big, scary place. People, the narrative goes, are not to be trusted. People are bad. People are evil.
I don’t buy it. Evil is a make-believe concept we’ve invented to deal with the complexities of fellow humans holding values and beliefs and perspectives different than our own … By and large, humans are kind. Self-interested sometimes, myopic sometimes, but kind. Generous and wonderful and kind.
No greater revelation has come from our journey than this.

== Attack ==
On July 29, 2018 at approximately 3:30 pm, while seven Western cyclists were cycling the Kulyab-Dushanbe highway (A385) next to the village of Safobakhsh on the Danghara district, about a 100 km south of Tajikistan's capital Dushanbe, 5 assailants driving a Daewoo sedan made a U-turn and rammed into them with their vehicle; then, they got out of the car and stabbed them with some knives and an axe. Four cyclists died and two were injured. According to Radio Free Europe, the men were searching for a target in order to perpetrate a terrorist attack and found the cyclists "by chance" on the highway; their backer agreed with the target on July 28 and they then followed them until the attack.

== Victims ==
Four touring cyclists died: Jay Austin and Lauren Geoghegan, from the US, who were on a world cycling tour; René Wokke, a Dutch citizen, and Markus Hummel from Switzerland. One Swiss and one Dutch citizen were admitted to the hospital in critical condition while a Frenchman who had fallen behind the group before the attack remained unharmed.

== Suspects ==
According to the Tajik authorities, the perpetrators were five Tajik nationals. Hussein Abdusamadov, 33, who had recently come back to Tajikistan from Russia, was said to be the ringleader of the group. He was arrested early on July 30. The other four suspects were killed by the police while, according to the police, resisting their arrest. Zafarjon Safarov and Asomiddin Majidov, both 19-years-old, two relatives of Abdusamadov, had just come back from Russia two days before the attacks. The two others were Jafariddin Yusupov, 26, and Asliddin Yusupov, 21, siblings. The oldest was said to have been radicalized by Abdusamadov in Russia and then convinced his brother to join the plot. The younger brother had served as a soldier in the Tajik Army.

The group of five appeared in a video posthumously released by news agencies of the Islamic State in which they pledge allegiance to its self-proclaimed caliph Abu Bakr al-Baghdadi. However, the Tajik authorities downplayed the IS's responsibility, blaming instead the Islamic Renaissance Party of Tajikistan, which had been banned in 2015. The General prosecutor of Tajikistan considered that the IS allegiance was just a cover.

The backer of the attack appeared to be a 45-year-old cleric named Nosirhoja Ubaidov, also known as Qori Nosir, who radicalized Hussein Abdusamadov and asked him to carry out a terrorist attack. Tajik authorities have linked him with the Islamic Renaissance Party of Tajikistan and Iran. Both the IRPT and Iran have denied any links with the attack.

Tajikistan experts have called into question the Tajik government's allegations, insisting that the attack was most likely perpetuated by grassroots Islamic State sympathizers, explaining that accusing the Islamic Renaissance Party is an opportunity for officials to repress opposition groups while downplaying the regional threat posed by the Islamic State.

On March 2, 2020 the ringleader Abdusamadov died in prison. Tajik authorities stated that his body bore no signs of violence, and added that investigations had been launched into the death. On March 4, Abdusamadov's mother told RFE/RL that the given cause of death was kidney failure, while also expressing skepticism. She also confirmed that there were no apparent traces of violence on her son's body.

== Aftermath ==
A memorial plaque was erected in Safobakhsh next to the attack site. Tajik authorities feared the murder would ruin efforts to promote tourism in the country and many travelers cancelled their visits after the attack.

Some English-speaking news sites and social media posts raised the idea that the American couple had been excessively naive for travelling in Tajikistan. Before the attack, however, the official U.S. travel advisory for Tajikistan was at Level 1, the lowest; it was raised to Level 2 (exercise increased caution) in the aftermath of the attack.
