= Lohur, Danghara District =

Lohur
- Jamoat
- Location within Tajikistan
- Coordinates: 38°02′N 69°12′E
- Country: Tajikistan
- Region: Khatlon
- District: Danghara District

Population (2015)
  - Total: 6,648
- Time zone: UTC+5 (TJT)

Lohur (Persian: لاهور) is a jamoat in Tajikistan. It is located in Danghara District in Khatlon Region. The jamoat has a total population of 6,648 (2015).
