= Nurudin N. Mukhitdinov =

Former Tajik Minister of Telecommunication

Nurudin N. Mukhitdinov (born 18 March 1959 in Kurgan-Tyube) was a Minister of Posts and Telecommunications of Tajikistan from 1995 to 2003 he is the Regional Commonwealth in the Field of Communications (RCC) Executive Committee Director General.

Mr. Mukhitdinov graduated from the Tashkent Electrotechnical Communications Institute in 1981 and became an, engineer in the Technical Division of the Electrotecnical Communications Administration. After serving in various executive positions between 1987 and 1995 he was appointed Minister of Post and Telecommunications of Tajikistan (often referred to as Minister of Communications) in July 1995, a position he held until 2003. In 2003 he was elected to the office of the RCC as Executive Committee Director General by the Communications Administrations of the Russian Federation and the Republic of Tajikistan, and was re-elected in 2007 for several terms after -2011, 2015, 2019 till he resigned in 2023/2024.

Mr. Mukhitdinov holds the degree of PhD-Candidate of Sciences (in economics) and several rewards and recognitions from Governments and Presidents of the CIS countries as well as from international institutions.
