= Mehnatobod, Zafarobod District =

Mehnatobod Russian: Мехнатобод Tajik: Меҳнатобод
- Town and Jamoat
- Location in Tajikistan
- Country: Tajikistan
- Region: Sughd Region
- District: Zafarobod District

Population (2020)
  - Total: 12,400
- Time zone: UTC+5 (TJT)

Mehnatobod (Tajik: Меҳнатобод) is a town and jamoat in north-western Tajikistan. It is located in Zafarobod District in Sughd Region. The town has a total population of 12,400 (2020).
