= Jomi District =

Jomi District Russian: Район Абдурахмана Джами Tajik: Ноҳияи Абдураҳмони Ҷомӣ
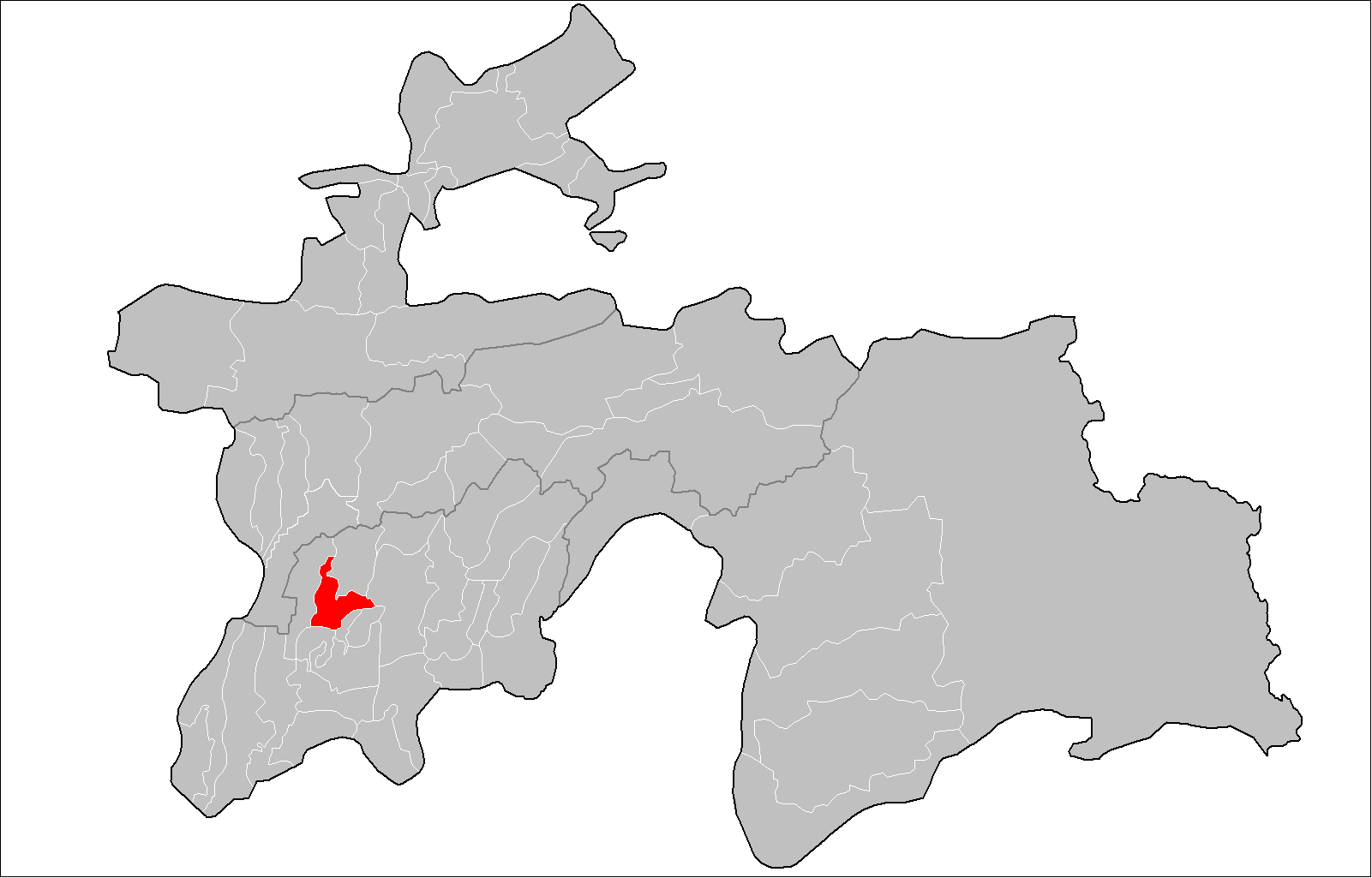
- Location in Tajikistan
- Coordinates: 37°56′45″N 68°48′42″E
- Country: Tajikistan
- Region: Khatlon Region
- Established: 2014
- Capital: Abdurahmoni Jomi

Area
  - Total: 597 km^{2} (231 sq mi)

Population (2020)
  - Total: 175,800
  - Density: 294/km^{2} (763/sq mi)
- Time zone: UTC+5
- Official languages: Russian (Interethnic); Tajik (State)
- Website: jomi.tj

Jomi District (Russian: Район Абдурахмана Джами; Tajik: Ноҳияи Абдураҳмони Ҷомӣ) is a district in Khatlon Region of Tajikistan, located north of the regional capital Bokhtar. The population of the district is 175,800 (January 2020 estimate). Called Kuybyshevskiy District in Soviet times, then Hojamaston District until 2004, and finally renamed Jomi District in honor of the 15th century Persian Poet Abdurahman Jami (Tajik: Ҷомӣ, transliterated as Jomi in Tajiki). The district capital is the town Abdurahmoni Jomi (former name: Kuybyshevsk).

== Administrative divisions ==
The district has an area of about 600 km^{2} (200 sq mi) and is divided administratively into one town and seven jamoats. They are as follows:

Jamoat	Population (Jan. 2015)
Abdurahmoni Jomi (town)	12,700
Aral	
Dusti	18,192
Iftikhor	14,223
Ittifoq	20,008
Kalinin	19,411
50-Solagii Tojikiston	18,247
Yakkatut	24,690
