= Sughdiyon, Zafarobod District =

Sighdiyon Tajik: Суғдиён
- Town and Jamoat
- Zafarobod District

- Location in Tajikistan
- Coordinates: 40°09′N 68°45′E
- Country: Tajikistan
- Region: Sughd Region
- District: Zafarobod District

Population (2020)
  - Total: 11,500
- Time zone: UTC+5 (TJT)

Sughdiyon (Tajik: Суғдиён, formerly Pakhtakoron, and Homid Aliyev) is a town and jamoat in north-western Tajikistan. It is located in Zafarobod District in Sughd Region. The jamoat includes the town Homid Aliev and the village Chashmasor. It has a total population of 11,500 (2020).
