= Jilikul =

- Location within Tajikistan
- Coordinates: 37°29′34″N 68°31′43″E
- Country: Tajikistan
- Region: Khatlon
- District: Dusti District
- Elevation: 354 m (1,161 ft)

Population (2015)
  - Total: 25,382
- Time zone: UTC+5

Jilikul (Tajik: Ҷиликӯл) is a village and jamoat in the Khatlon Region, Tajikistan. It is the seat of the Dusti District (formerly: Jilikul District). It is located in the southwestern portion of Tajikistan approximately 117 km (73 miles) from Dushanbe. The jamoat has a total population of 25,382 (2015).

== Geography ==
=== Climate ===
Jilikul has a cold semi-arid climate (Köppen climate classification BSk). The average annual temperature is 17.2 °C (63 °F). The warmest month is July with an average temperature of 29.9 °C (85.8 °F) and the coolest month is January with an average temperature of 3.2 °C (37.8 °F). The average annual precipitation is 264.2mm (10.4") and has an average of 66 days with precipitation. The wettest month is March with an average of 64.6mm (2.5") of precipitation and the driest month is August with an average of 0mm of precipitation.

Climate data for Jilikul
Month	Jan	Feb	Mar	Apr	May	Jun	Jul	Aug	Sep	Oct	Nov	Dec	Year
Daily mean °C (°F)	3.2 (37.8)	6.1 (43.0)	11.8 (53.2)	18.3 (64.9)	23.4 (74.1)	28.4 (83.1)	29.9 (85.8)	27.7 (81.9)	23.0 (73.4)	17.2 (63.0)	10.9 (51.6)	5.9 (42.6)	17.2 (63.0)
Average precipitation mm (inches)	36.7 (1.44)	41.1 (1.62)	64.6 (2.54)	42.5 (1.67)	22.4 (0.88)	0.8 (0.03)	0.4 (0.02)	0.1 (0.00)	0.2 (0.01)	7.0 (0.28)	19.0 (0.75)	28.8 (1.13)	264.2 (10.40)
Average precipitation days (≥ 0.1 mm)	8.9	9.4	11.9	9.7	7.0	1.2	0.5	0.0	0.2	3.2	5.4	8.6	66
Average relative humidity (%)	75.1	71.4	68.7	64.0	51.4	35.0	32.7	33.9	37.0	47.6	61.2	72.2	54.2
Source: "The Climate of Jilikul". Weatherbase.
