= Bahori, Tajikistan =

Bahori Баҳори
- Village
- Location within Tajikistan
- Coordinates: 37°24′N 67°59′E
- Country: Tajikistan
- Region: Khatlon Region
- District: Nosiri Khusrav District
- Time zone: UTC+5 (TJT)

Bahori (Tajik: Баҳори Bahori, also Баҳор Bahor) is a village in the Nosiri Khusrav District of the Khatlon Region of Tajikistan. Bahori is the seat of Nosiri Khusrav District, and of the jamoat Firuza.
