= Nosiri Khusrav District =

Nosiri Khusrav District Russian: Район Носири Хусрав Tajik: Ноҳияи Носири Хусрав Beshkent, Bishkent
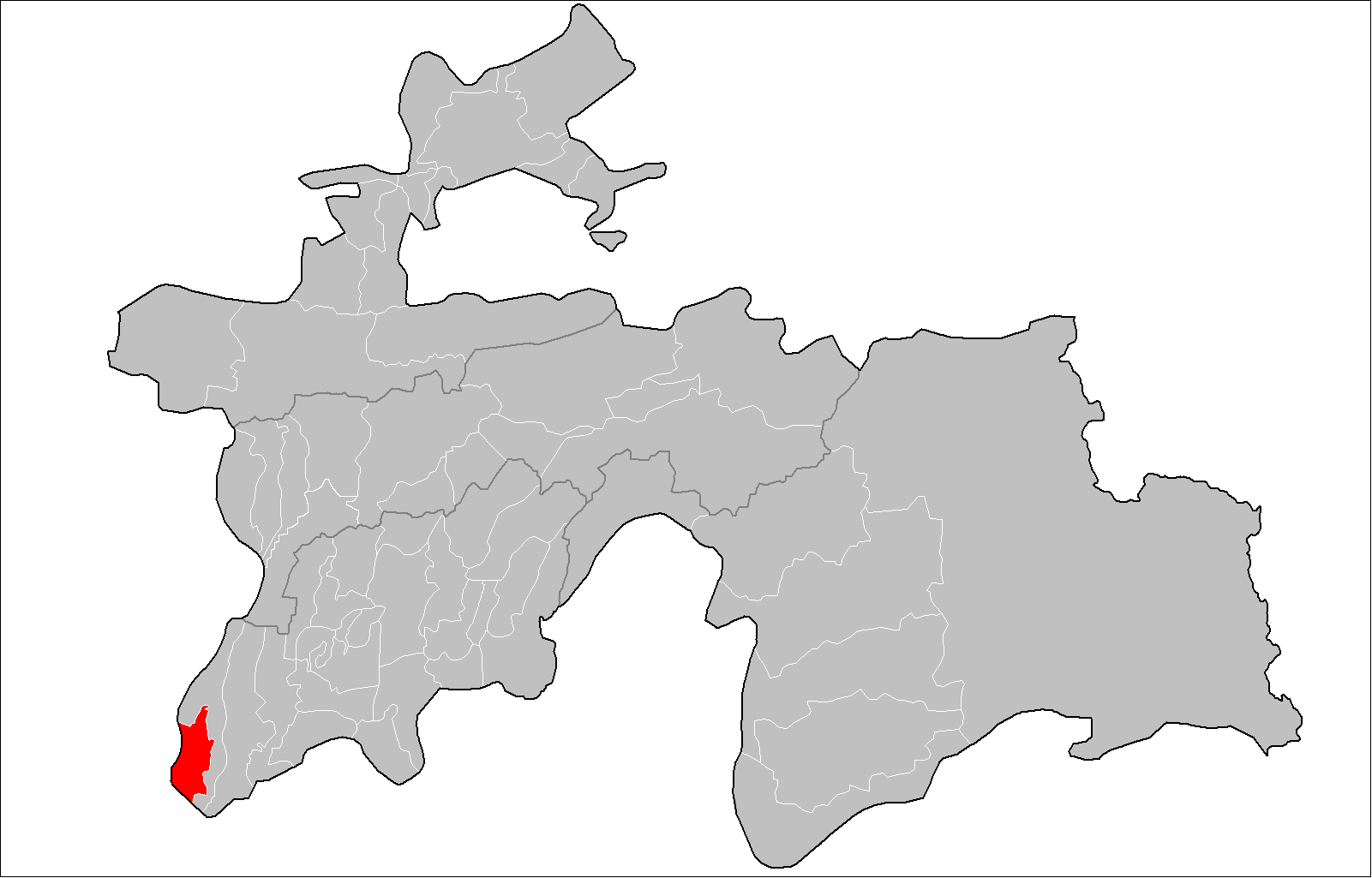
- Location of the district in Tajikistan
- Coordinates: 37°15′N 68°00′E
- Country: Tajikistan
- region: Khatlon Region
- Capital: Bahori

Area
  - Total: 800 km^{2} (310 sq mi)

Population (2020)
  - Total: 39,300
  - Density: 49/km^{2} (130/sq mi)
- Time zone: UTC+5
- Official languages: Russian (Interethnic); Tajik (State)
- Website: www.nosirikhusrav.tj

Nosiri Khusrav District (Russian: Район Носири Хусрав/Носири-Хусравский район; Tajik: ноҳияи Носири Хусрав, Nohiya-i Nosiri Khusrav), is a district located in the south-western corner of Khatlon Region of Tajikistan on the Amu Darya. It shares borders with Uzbekistan to the west, Afghanistan to the south and the Shahrtuz District to the north and east. The population of the district is 39,300 (January 2020 estimate). Until 2004 it was called Beshkent District (Tajik: ноҳияи Бешкент); then renamed in honor of the 11th century Persian-Tajik poet Nosiri Khusrav (sometimes also Khisrav). The district capital is Bahori, a village at the northernmost tip of the district.

Beshkent is a lowland 70 kilometers in length and 5 kilometers in width—dry without any reliable source of water. Beshkent is the warmest valley in Tajikistan, with average temperatures in January and July of 3 °C and 31 °C respectively. The annual average precipitation is 140 millimeters.

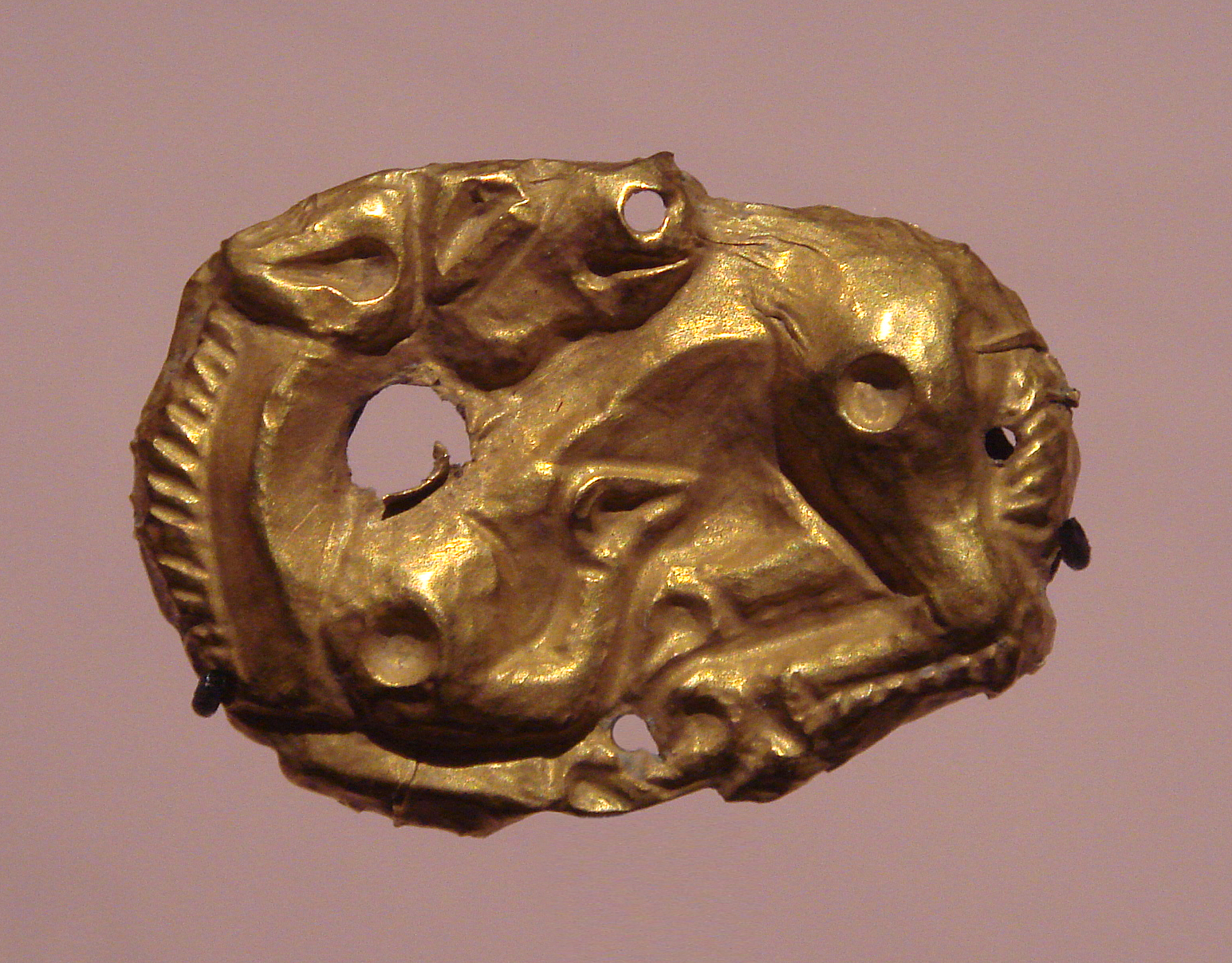
Horse, Beshkent necropolis, Tajikistan, 1-2nd century CE

== Administrative divisions ==
The district has an area of about 800 km^{2} (300 sq mi) and is divided administratively into three jamoats. They are as follows:

Jamoat	Population (Jan. 2015)
Firuza	11,796
Istiqlol	9,820
Navruz	13,935

== See also ==
- Bishkent culture
