= Khuroson District =

Khuroson District Russian: Хуросонский район Tajik: Ноҳияи Хуросон
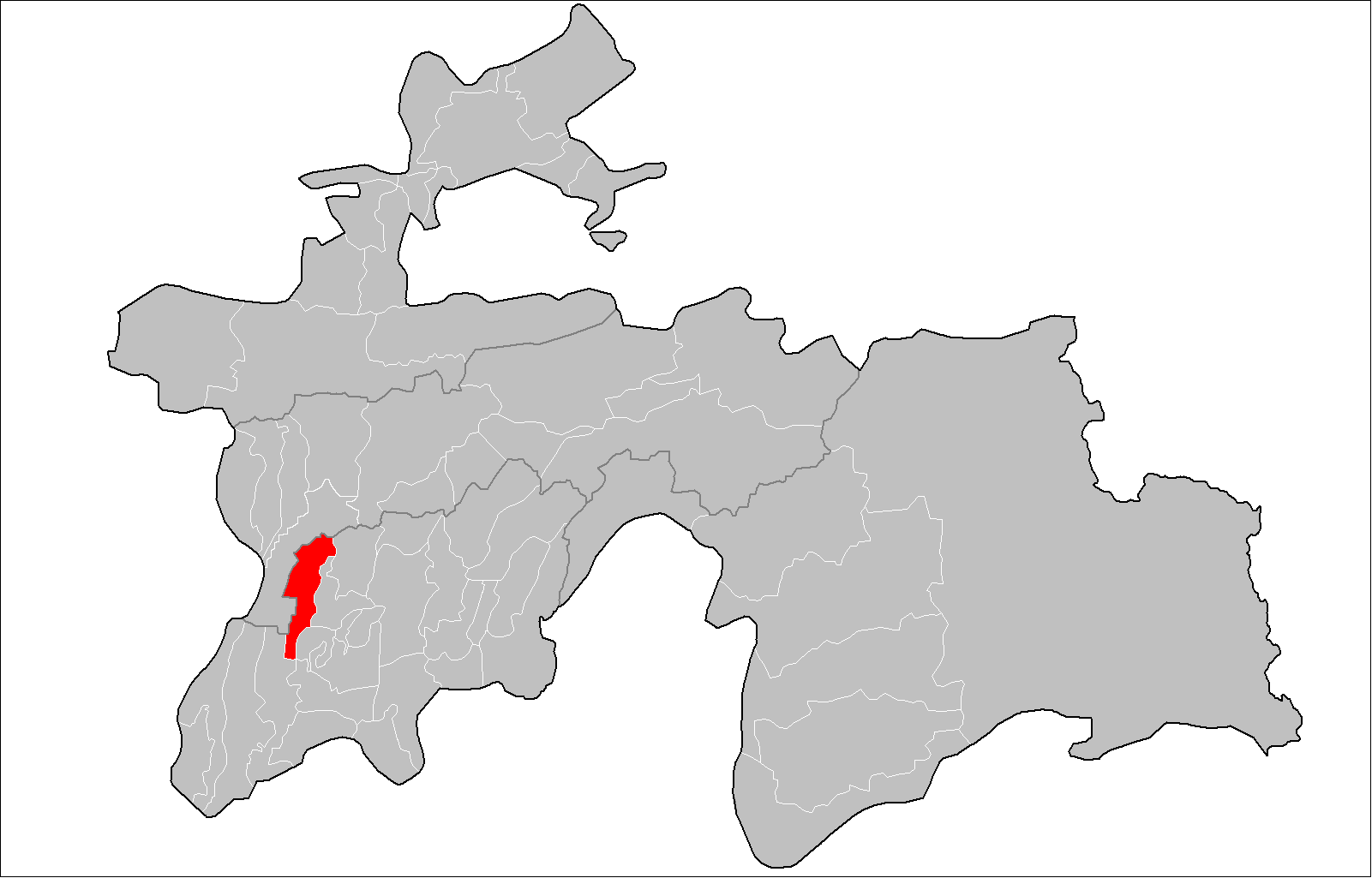
- Location of the district in Tajikistan
- Coordinates: 38°05′N 68°40′E
- Country: Tajikistan
- Region: Khatlon Region
- Capital: Obikiik

Area
  - Total: 900 km^{2} (350 sq mi)

Population (2020)
  - Total: 116,500
  - Density: 130/km^{2} (340/sq mi)
- Time zone: UTC+5
- Official languages: Russian (Interethnic); Tajik (State)
- Website: balkhi.tj

Khuroson District (Russian: Хуросонский район; Tajik: Ноҳияи Хуросон, 1991–2004: Ghozimalik District, before 1991: Ilyichyovskiy District) is a district in Khatlon Region of Tajikistan. It extends south from national capital Dushanbe toward the regional capital Bokhtar. Its capital is the town Obikiik (former name: Pravda). The population of the district is 116,500 (January 2020 estimate).

== Administrative divisions ==
The district has an area of about 900 km^{2} (300 sq mi) and is divided administratively into one town and five jamoats. They are as follows:

Jamoat	Population (Jan. 2015)
Obikiik (town)	8,500
Ayni	26,724
Fakhrobod	12,264
Ghallaobod	18,253
Hiloli	18,426
Qizilqal'a	17,607
