= Avicenna Tajik State Medical University =

Public university in Tajikistan

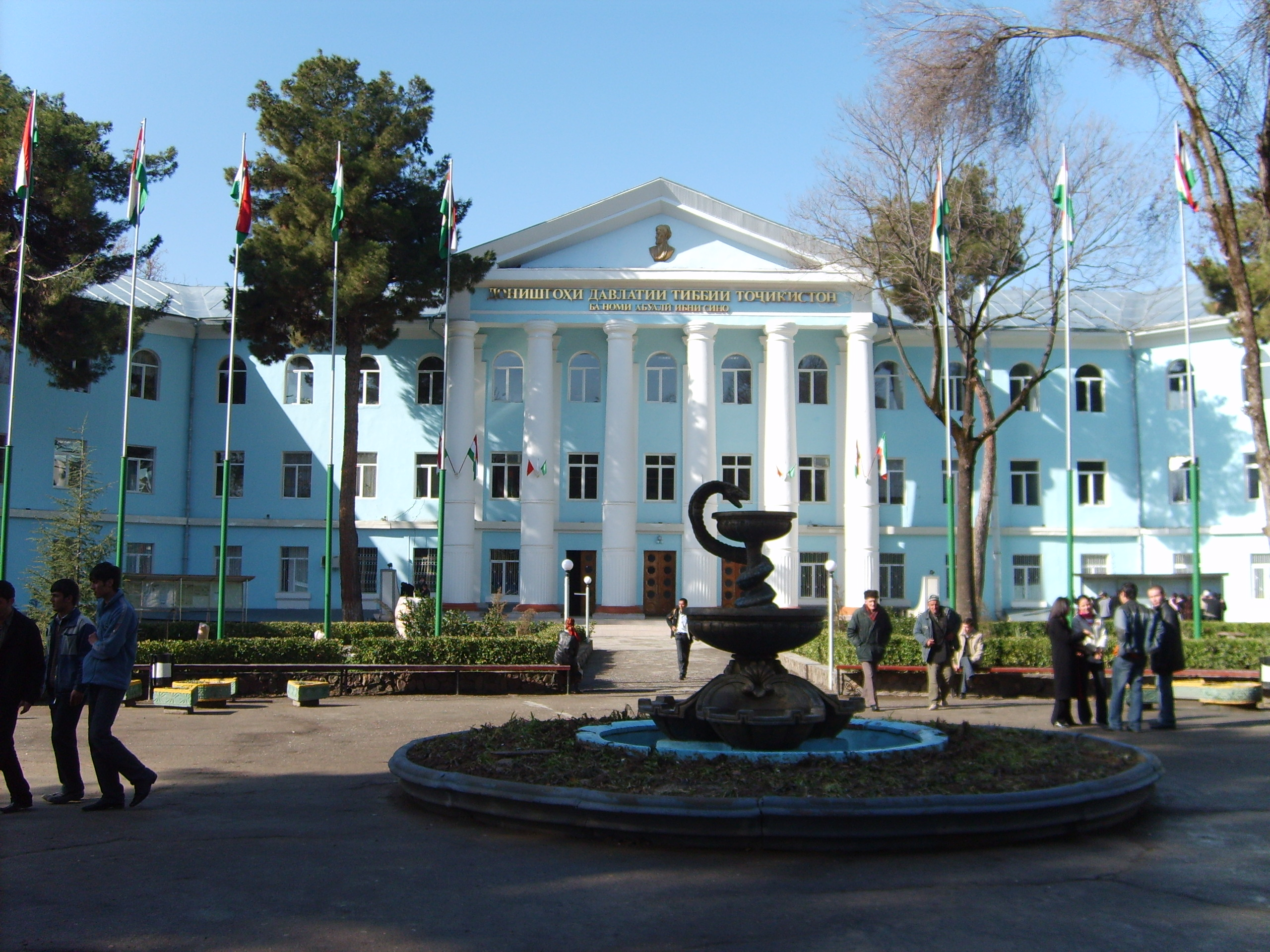
- Type: Public
- Established: 1939
- Affiliations: International Ibn Sina clinic, Dushanbe
- Academic staff: 276 faculty members
- Administrative staff: 63 chairs
- Students: 4800
- Location: Dushanbe, Tajikistan; 38°36′06″N 68°47′08″E
- Website: tajmedun.tj

Avicenna Tajik State Medical University (Tajik: Донишгоҳи давлатии тиббии Тоҷикистон, romanized: Donishgohi davlatii tibbii Tojikiston; Russian: Таджикский государственный медицинский университет, romanized: Tadzhikskiy gosudarstvennyy meditsinskiy universitet) is a state acreditted university in Tajikistan. It is located in Dushanbe and named after the Persian polymath Abuali Ibni Sino (also spelled Avicenna).

== History ==
Since its establishment in 1939, the medical university has educated more than 5000 graduates in different faculties.

== Structure ==
=== Centers ===
- Center Learning of Practical Skills
- Center of Pre-University Training
- Treatment and Diagnostic Center
- Center of Education, Science and Production “Farmacia”
- Centre of Strategic Development and Management

=== Faculties ===
The structure of the university has 5 faculties:

- Medicine
- Pediatrics
- Dentistry
- Pharmacy

== Rectors ==
The leaders of the institute were:

- Adolf Kraus (1939-1942)
- K. Romadonovsky (1942)
- A. Prokopchuk (1942)
- G. Skosogorenko (1942—1944)
- D. Khveiseni (1944-1947)
- Lev Sutulov (1947-1950)
- Y. Rakhimov (1950-1957)
- Z. Khodzhayev (1957-1965)
- K. Tadzhiev (1965-1973)
- Y. Iskhaki (1973–1996)
- H. Rofiev (1996-1999)
- N. Fayzulloev (2000–2003)
- K. Kurbonov (2003–2005)
- Gulzoda Makhmadshoh Kurbonali (2016–Present)

== See also ==
- List of hospitals in Tajikistan (Affiliated International Ibn Sina Clinic)
