= Obikiik =

Obikiik Обикиик (Russian & Tajik) Russian: Правда, romanized: Pravda (until 2003)
- Location in Tajikistan
- Coordinates: 38°9′31″N 68°40′20″E
- Country: Tajikistan
- Region: Khatlon
- District: Khuroson

Population (2020)
  - Total: 12,300
- Official languages: Russian (Interethnic); Tajik (State)

Obikiik (Russian and Tajik: Обикиик), formerly Pravda, is a location in Tajikistan. It is the administrative capital of Khuroson District in Khatlon Region. The population of the town is 12,300 (January 2020 estimate).

Pravda was renamed Obikiik around 2003, at the time when former Ghozimalik district was renamed Khuroson district.
