= Zafarobod =

Zafarobod Зафаробод
- Town and Jamoat
- Location in Tajikistan
- Coordinates: 40°11′N 68°53′E
- Country: Tajikistan
- District: Zafarobod District

Population (2020)
  - Total: 20,600

Zafarobod (Tajik: Зафаробод) is a town and jamoat in north-western Tajikistan. It is located in Sughd Region. It is the capital of Zafarobod district. Its population is 20,600 (2020).
