= Yovon District =

Yovon District Russian: Яванский район Tajik: Ноҳияи Ёвон
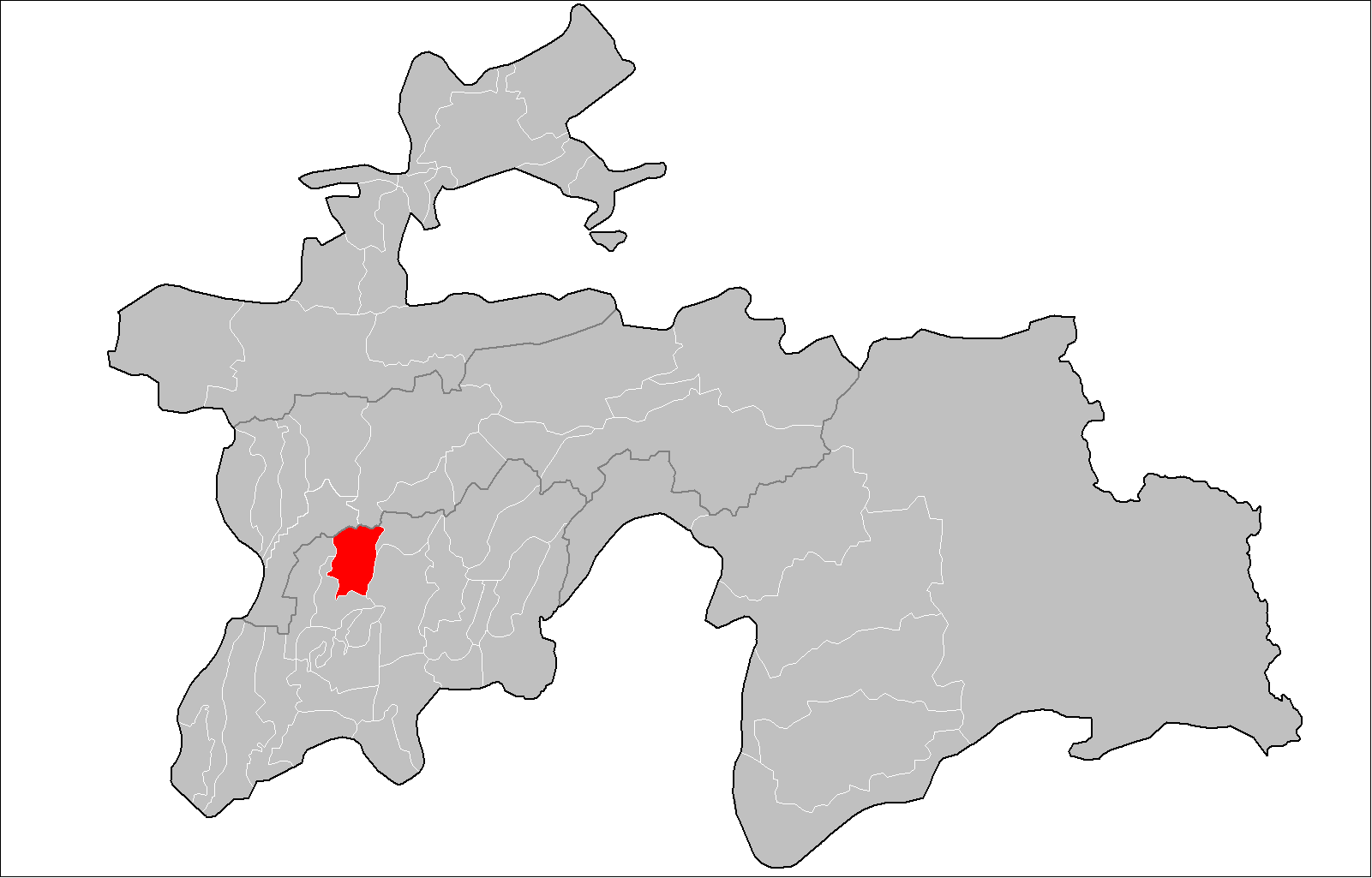
- Location of the district in Tajikistan
- Coordinates: 38°15′N 69°00′E
- Country: Tajikistan
- Region: Khatlon Region
- Capital: Yovon

Area
  - Total: 900 km^{2} (350 sq mi)

Population (2020)
  - Total: 234,600
  - Density: 260/km^{2} (680/sq mi)
- Time zone: UTC+5
- Official languages: Russian (Interethnic); Tajik (State)

Yovon District (Russian: Яванский район; Tajik: Ноҳияи Ёвон Nohiyai Yovon) is a district in Khatlon Region, Tajikistan. Its capital is the town Yovon. The population of the district is 234,600 (January 2020 estimate).

== Administrative divisions ==
The district has an area of about 900 km^{2} (300 sq mi) and is divided administratively into two towns and seven jamoats. They are as follows:

Jamoat	Population (Jan. 2015)
Hayotinav (town)	3,900
Yovon (town)	33,200
Chorgul	15,711
Dahana	20,574
Hasan Huseynov	24,894
Norin	21,314
Obshoron	30,242
Sitorai Surkh	20,833
Gulsara Yusufova	19,243
