= Dusti District =

Dusti District Russian: Район Дусти Tajik: Ноҳияи Дӯстӣ
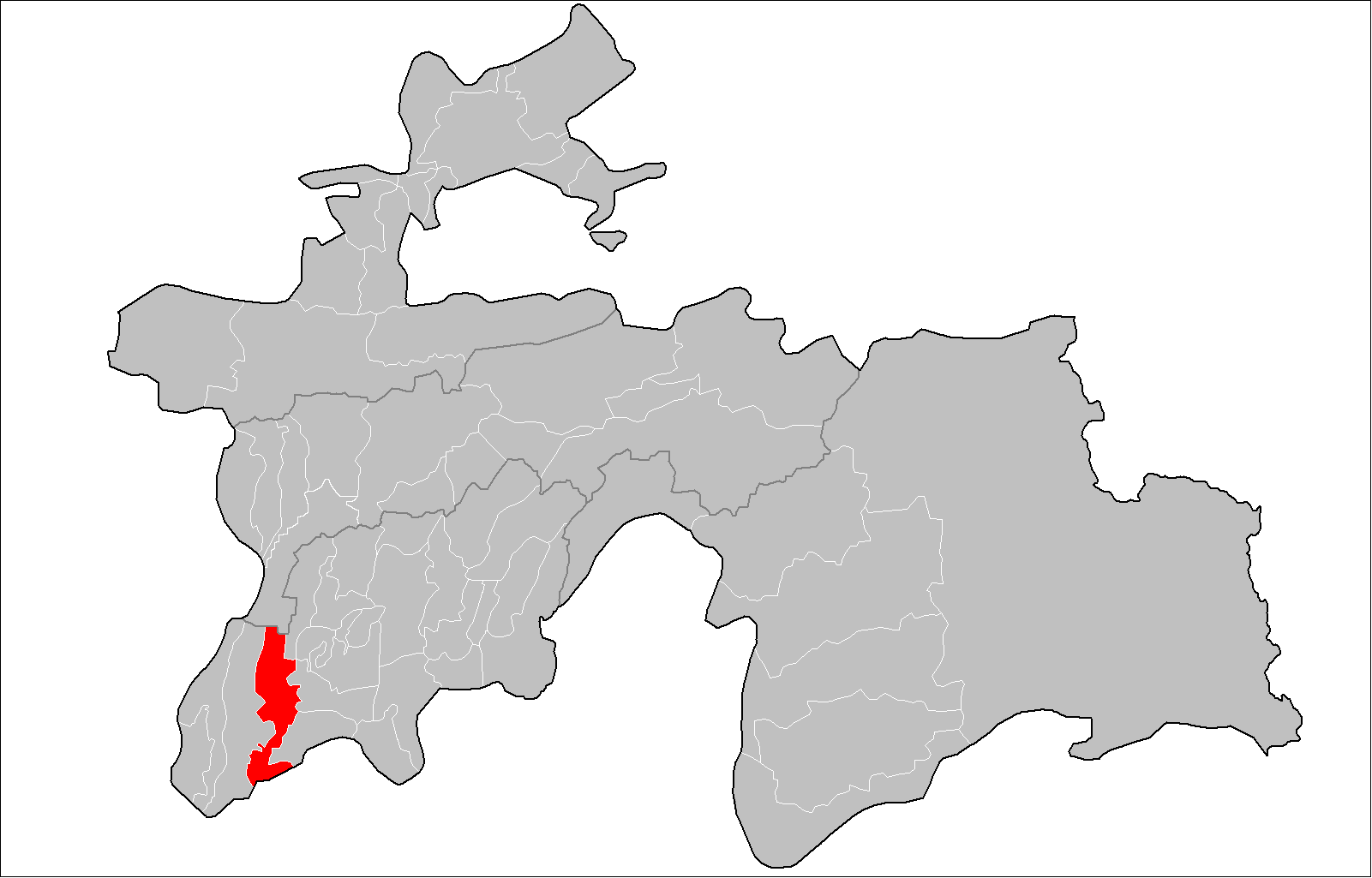
- Location of the district in Tajikistan
- Coordinates: 37°35′N 68°25′E
- Country: Tajikistan
- Region: Khatlon Region
- Capital: Jilikul

Area
  - Total: 1,200 km^{2} (460 sq mi)

Population (2020)
  - Total: 117,100
  - Density: 98/km^{2} (250/sq mi)
- Time zone: UTC+5
- Official languages: Russian (Interethnic); Tajik (State)
- Website: ndusti.tj

Dusti District (Russian: Район Дусти; Tajik: Ноҳияи Дӯстӣ, before 2016: Jilikul District) is a district in Khatlon Region, Tajikistan. Its capital is the village Jilikul. The population of the district is 117,100 (January 2020 estimate).

== Administrative divisions ==
The district has an area of about 1,200 km^{2} (500 sq mi) and is divided administratively into one town and five jamoats. They are as follows:

Jamoat	Population (Jan. 2015)
Gharavuti (town)	7,100
Dehqonobod	15,061
Gardi Gulmurodov	16,472
Jilikul	25,382
Nuri Vakhsh	17,319
20-Solagii Istiqloliyati Jumhurii Tojikiston	22,447
