= Yovon =

Yovon Tajik: Ёвон
- Location in Tajikistan
- Coordinates: 38°19′N 69°3′E
- Country: Tajikistan
- Region: Khatlon
- District: Yovon
- Elevation: 655 m (2,149 ft)

Population (2020)
  - Total: 36,700
- Time zone: UTC+5
- Official languages: Russian (Interethnic); Tajik (State)

Yovon (Tajik: Ёвон) is a town in Tajikistan located in the Khatlon Region. The population of the town is 36,700 (January 2020 estimate). It is approximately 30 kilometres (20 mi) southeast of Dushanbe.

== Geography ==
=== Climate ===
Yovon has a hot-summer Mediterranean climate (Köppen climate classification Csa). The average annual temperature is 14.6 °C (58.3 °F). The warmest month is July with an average temperature of 26.8 °C (80.2 °F) and the coolest month is January with an average temperature of 1.7 °C (35.1 °F). The average annual precipitation is 552.7 millimetres (21.76 in) and there are on average of 85.5 days with precipitation. The wettest month is March with an average of 107.3 mm (4.22 in) of precipitation and the driest month is August with an average of 0.6 mm (0.024 in) of precipitation.

Climate data for Yovon
Month	Jan	Feb	Mar	Apr	May	Jun	Jul	Aug	Sep	Oct	Nov	Dec	Year
Daily mean °C (°F)	1.7 (35.1)	3.7 (38.7)	9.1 (48.4)	15.4 (59.7)	19.7 (67.5)	24.6 (76.3)	26.8 (80.2)	25.1 (77.2)	20.4 (68.7)	14.9 (58.8)	9.3 (48.7)	4.6 (40.3)	14.6 (58.3)
Average precipitation mm (inches)	63.5 (2.50)	74.1 (2.92)	107.3 (4.22)	99.0 (3.90)	68.0 (2.68)	7.4 (0.29)	3.5 (0.14)	0.6 (0.02)	2.2 (0.09)	28.4 (1.12)	42.1 (1.66)	56.6 (2.23)	552.7 (21.76)
Average precipitation days (≥ 0.1 mm)	10.2	11.4	14.1	12.5	10.0	2.9	1.4	0.4	0.9	5.0	6.8	9.9	85.5
Average relative humidity (%)	70.8	68.9	65.5	61.9	54.5	40.4	36.8	38.0	40.6	50.5	59.2	68.0	54.6
Source: "The Climate of Yovon". Weatherbase.
