= Istiqlol =

Coordinates: 40°34′N 69°38′E

Istiqlol Russian: Истиклол Tajik: Истиқлол
- Location in Tajikistan
- Country: Tajikistan
- Region: Sughd Region
- City: Khujand

Population (2020)
  - Total: 17,600
- Official languages: Russian (Interethnic); Tajik (State)

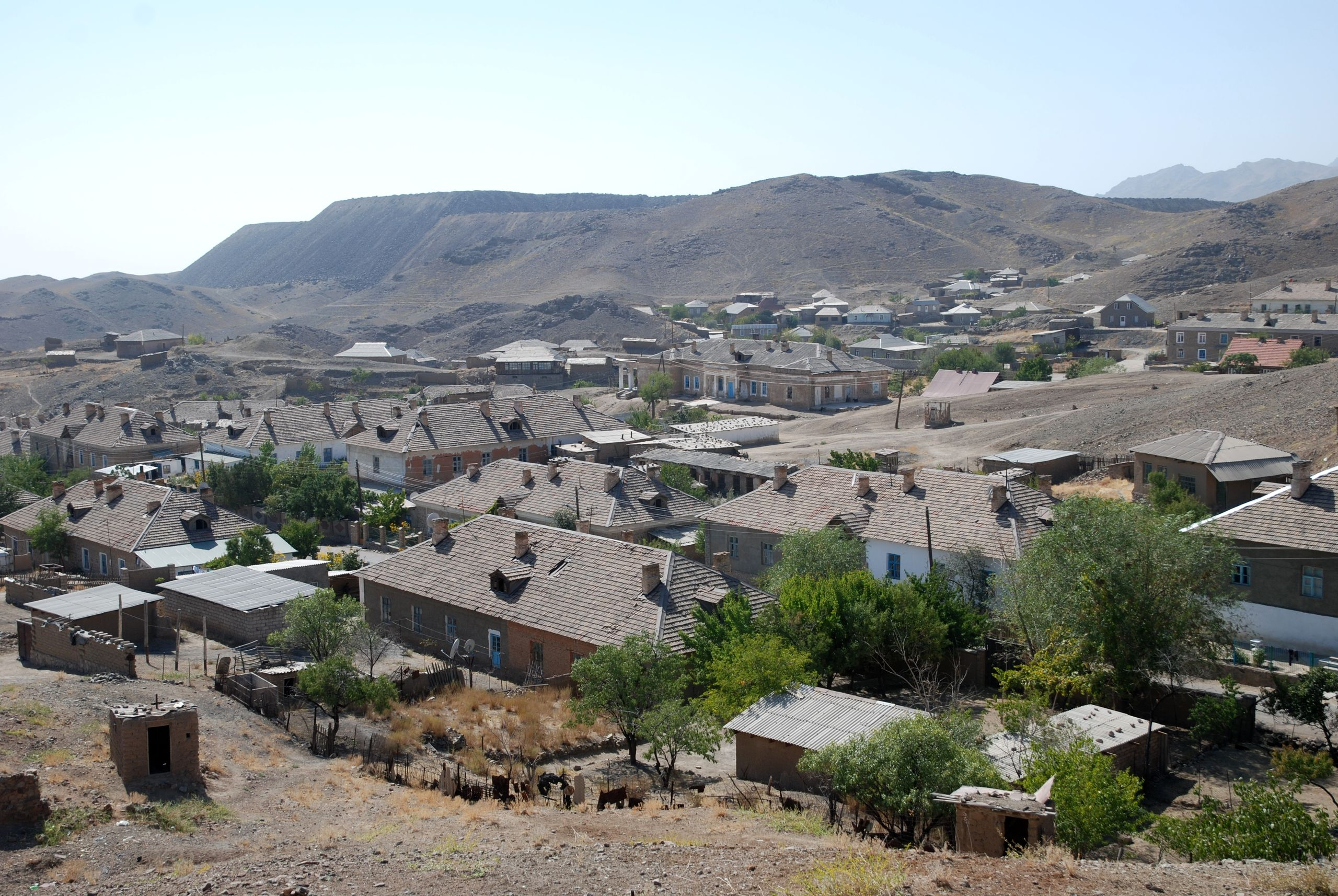
Old Istiqlol

Istiqlol (Russian: Истиклол; Tajik: Истиқлол, formerly Taboshar) is a city in Tajikistan, located in Sughd Region. Istiqlol is a city of regional subordination, administratively subordinated to the regional capital of Khujand.

The first Soviet uranium mine was established in Taboshar during the Second World War. Taboshar was the first of many officially secret Soviet closed cities related to uranium mining and production. In 2022, a contract was agreed for a subsidiary of TVEL to reclaim land on the 8 ha (20 acres) tailings dump, which contains 1.12×10^{6} m^{3} (40×10^{6} ft^{3}) of material.

The population of Istiqlol in 2020 is estimated at 17,600.

== See also ==
- List of cities in Tajikistan
