= Danghara =

Danghara Tajik: Данғара
- Location in Tajikistan
- Coordinates: 38°05′54″N 69°20′48″E
- Country: Tajikistan
- Region: Khatlon
- District: Danghara
- Elevation: 649 m (2,129 ft)

Population (2020)
  - Total: 31,100
- Official languages: Russian (Interethnic); Tajik (State)

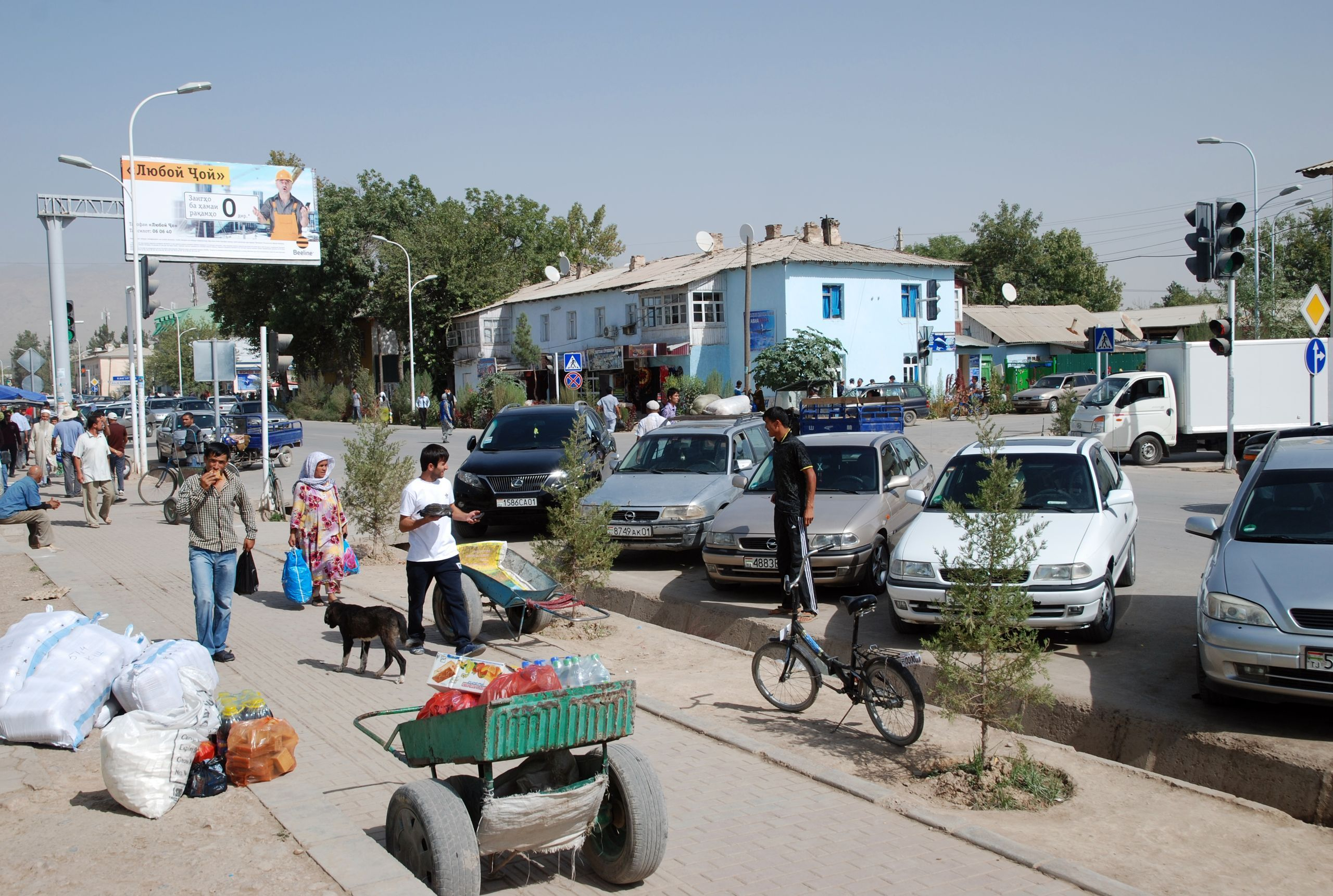
Danghara, main road.

Danghara (Tajik: Данғара), is a town in the Khatlon Region of Tajikistan. It is the capital of Danghara District. It is the hometown of Tajikistan's president, Emomali Rahmon as well as the country's first deputy prime minister, Asadullo Ghulomov, and several other senior government officials and members of parliament. As of 2020, the town's population was estimated at 31,100.

In 2012, Radio Free Europe reported that the town might be the target of a plan to relocate the country's capital city. The rumors were spurred by the fact that a new international airport was being constructed in the area. Additionally, a major rail line was rerouted and the town's roads renovated.

== 2018 terrorist attack ==
In 2018, four Western cyclists were killed near Danghara, by five men who claimed to be affiliated with the Islamic State of Iraq and the Levant. Two other cyclists were injured in the attack.

== Climate ==
Danghara has a hot-summer Mediterranean climate (Köppen climate classification Csa).

Climate data for Danghara
Month	Jan	Feb	Mar	Apr	May	Jun	Jul	Aug	Sep	Oct	Nov	Dec	Year
Mean daily maximum °C (°F)	7.3 (45.1)	9.9 (49.8)	15.5 (59.9)	22.5 (72.5)	27.9 (82.2)	34.3 (93.7)	36.4 (97.5)	35.2 (95.4)	30.6 (87.1)	23.7 (74.7)	15.9 (60.6)	9.7 (49.5)	22.4 (72.3)
Mean daily minimum °C (°F)	−1.8 (28.8)	0.0 (32.0)	5.0 (41.0)	10.3 (50.5)	13.9 (57.0)	17.6 (63.7)	19.5 (67.1)	17.7 (63.9)	12.7 (54.9)	8.2 (46.8)	3.4 (38.1)	0.3 (32.5)	8.9 (48.0)
Average precipitation mm (inches)	53 (2.1)	66 (2.6)	98 (3.9)	76 (3.0)	59 (2.3)	5 (0.2)	2 (0.1)	0 (0)	1 (0.0)	24 (0.9)	33 (1.3)	49 (1.9)	466 (18.3)
Source: Climate-data.org

== Population ==
1959	1970	1979	1989
5761	9083	12 892	16 898
