= Zafarobod District, Tajikistan =

Zafarobod District Tajik: Ноҳияи Зафаробод
- District
- Location of Zafarobod District in Tajikistan
- Coordinates: 40°10′N 68°55′E
- Country: Tajikistan
- Region: Sughd Region
- Capital: Zafarobod

Area
  - Total: 400 km^{2} (150 sq mi)

Population (2020)
  - Total: 75,900
  - Density: 190/km^{2} (490/sq mi)
- Time zone: UTC+5 (TJT)

Zafarobod District (Tajik: Ноҳияи Зафаробод, Nohiyai Zafarobod) is a district in Sughd Region, Tajikistan. Its capital is Zafarobod. The population of the district is 75,900 (January 2020 estimate). The entire population of the Yaghnob Valley was forcibly resettled in the Zafarabad region in the 1970s by the Soviets.

== Administrative divisions ==
The district has an area of about 400 km^{2} (200 sq mi) and is divided administratively into three towns and two jamoats. They are as follows:

Jamoat	Population (Jan. 2020)
Homid Aliev (town)	11,500
Mehnatobod (town)	13,208
Zafarobod (town)	27,148
Jomi	7,264
Ravshan	16,363
