= Jayhun District =

Jayhun District Russian: Район Джайхун Tajik: Ноҳияи Ҷайҳун
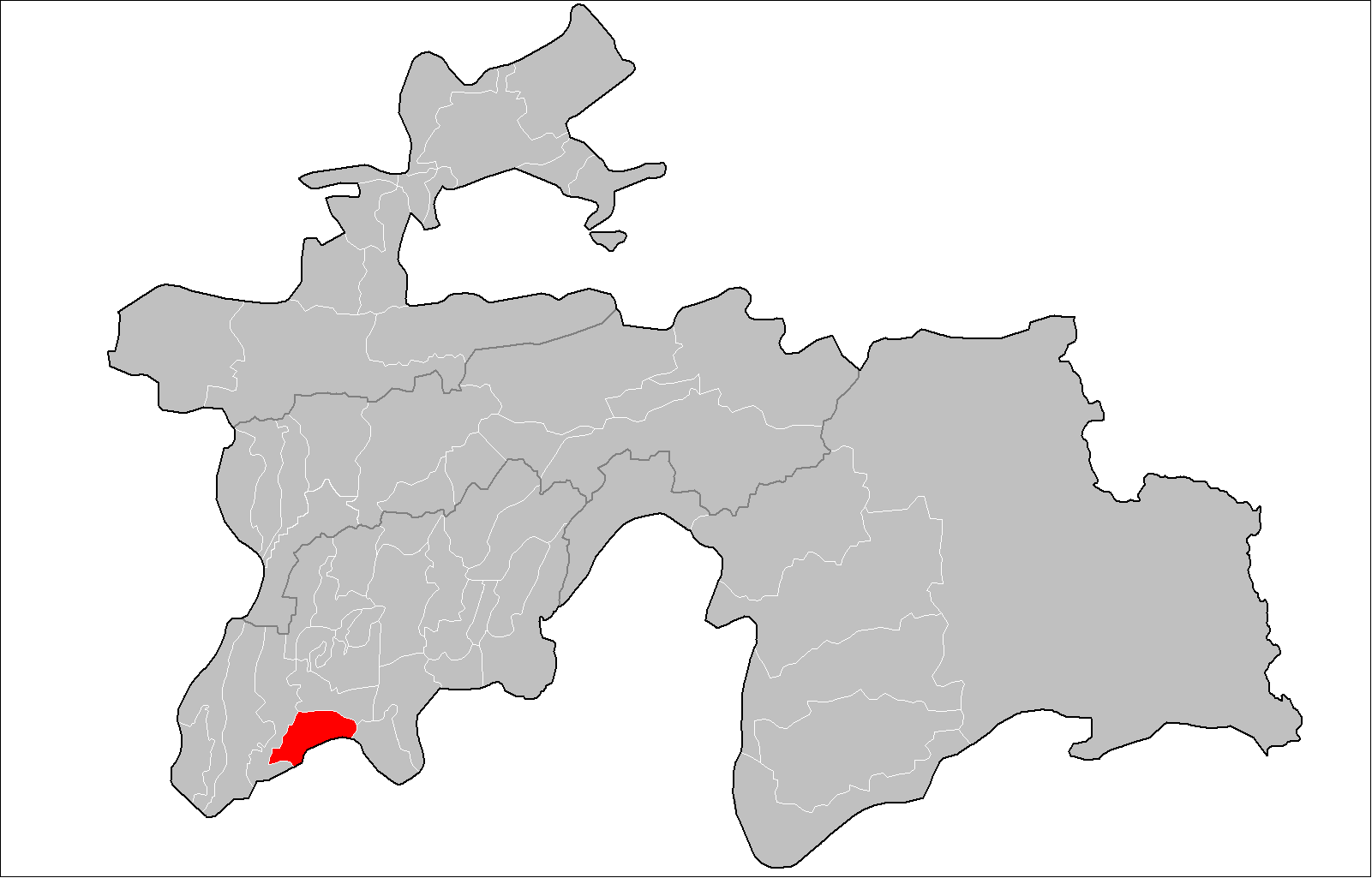
- Location of the district in Tajikistan
- Coordinates: 37°20′N 68°40′E
- Country: Tajikistan
- Region: Khatlon Region
- Capital: Dusti

Area
  - Total: 1,000 km^{2} (390 sq mi)

Population (2020)
  - Total: 139,000
  - Density: 140/km^{2} (360/sq mi)
- Time zone: UTC+5
- Official languages: Russian (Interethnic); Tajik (State)

Jayhun District (Russian: Район Джайхун; Tajik: Ноҳияи Ҷайҳун, before 2016: Qumsangir District) is a district in Khatlon Region, Tajikistan. Its capital is the town Dusti. The population of the district is 139,000 (January 2020 estimate).

During part of the Soviet period the district was named Molotovobod District.

== Administrative divisions ==
The district has an area of about 1,000 km^{2} (400 sq mi) and is divided administratively into one town and five jamoats. They are as follows:

Jamoat	Population (Jan. 2015)
Dusti (town)	16,500
Istiqlol	24,717
Panj	22,319
Qumsangir	25,212
Vahdati milli	20,882
Yakkadin	8,754
