= Dusti =

Dusti Russian: Дусти Tajik: Дӯстӣ
- Location in Tajikistan
- Coordinates: 37°20′55″N 68°40′24″E
- Country: Tajikistan
- Region: Khatlon Region
- District: Jayhun District

Population (2020)
  - Total: 18,800
- Official languages: Russian (Interethnic); Tajik (State)

Dusti (Russian: Дусти; Tajik: Дӯстӣ) is a town in Khatlon Region, southern Tajikistan, near the Afghan border. It is the seat of the Jayhun District. Its population is 18,800 (January 2020 estimate). Under Soviet rule the town was named Molotovabad.

== Transport ==
Dusti is located on north–south highway E123. It is served by a station on the national railway system.

== See also ==
- Railway stations in Tajikistan
