= Danghara District =

Danghara District (Russian: Дангаринский район) (Tajik: Ноҳияи Данғара)
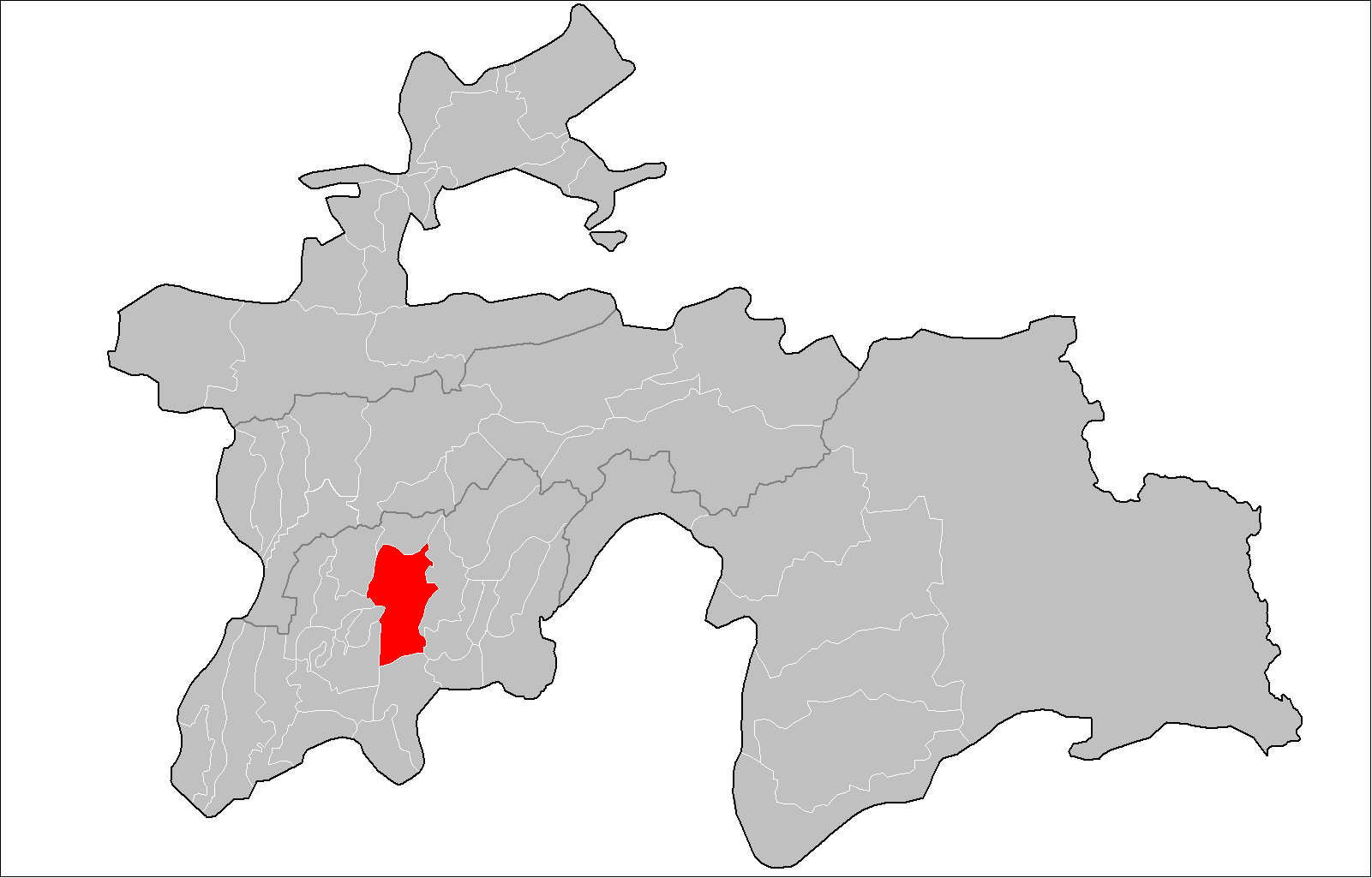
- Coordinates: 38°05′54″N 69°20′48″E
- Country: Tajikistan
- Region: Khatlon
- Capital: Danghara
- Established: 8 July 1932

Area
  - Total: 2,009.8 km^{2} (776.0 sq mi)

Population (2020)
  - Total: 161,000
  - Density: 80.1/km^{2} (207/sq mi)
  - Ethnicities: Tajik
  - Languages: Tajik
- Time zone: UTC+5
- +992 3312: 735140
- Official languages: Russian (Interethnic); Tajik (State)

Danghara District or Nohiya-i Danghara (Russian: Дангаринский район; Tajik: Ноҳияи Данғара) is a district in Khatlon Region, Tajikistan. Its capital is the town Danghara. The population of the district is 161,000 (January 2020 estimate).

== Administrative divisions ==
The district has an area of about 2,000 km^{2} (800 sq mi) and is divided administratively into one town and eight jamoats. They are as follows:

Jamoat	Population (Jan. 2015)
Danghara (town)	25,000
Korez	15,027
Lohur	6,648
Lolazor	18,285
Oqsu	20,119
Pushing	13,293
Sangtuda	12,686
Sebiston	12,736
Sharipov	20,452
