= Bokhtar =

Bokhtar Tajik: Бохтар
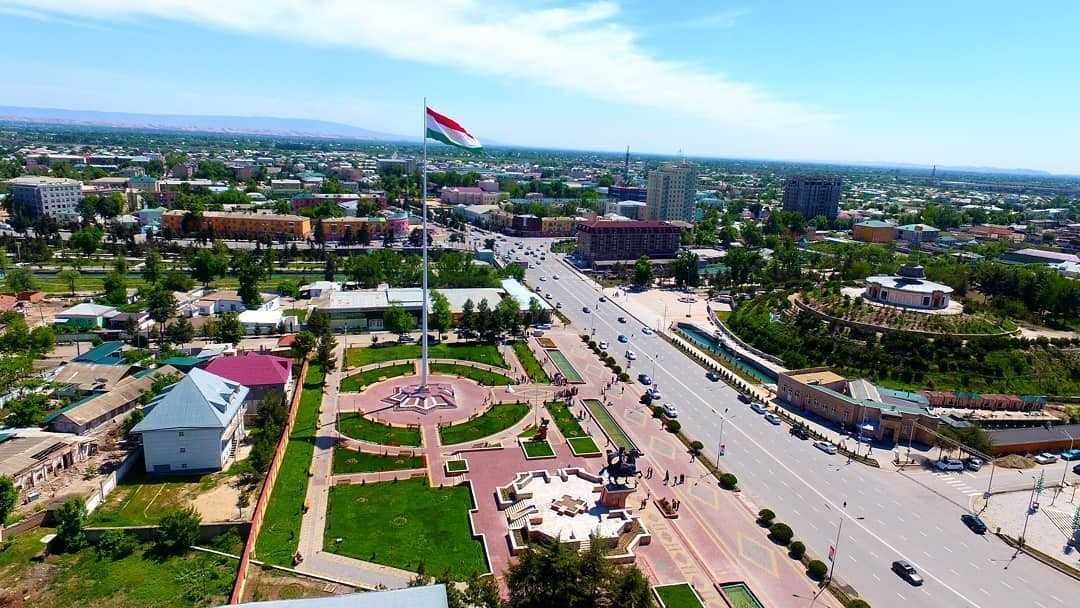
- Bokhtar in 2018

- Location in Tajikistan
- Coordinates: 37°50′11″N 68°46′49″E
- Country: Tajikistan
- Province: Khatlon

Area
  - City: 26 km^{2} (10 sq mi)
- Elevation: 430 m (1,410 ft)

Population (2019)
  - City: 126,700
  - Density: 4,261/km^{2} (11,040/sq mi)
  - Metro: 190,000
- Area code: 992-3222
- Official languages: Russian (Interethnic); Tajik (State)

Bokhtar (Tajik: Бохтар), previously known as Qurghonteppa, Kurganteppa and Kurgan-Tyube, is a city in southwestern Tajikistan, which serves as the capital of the Khatlon region. Bokhtar is the largest city in southern Tajikistan, and is located 100 kilometres (62 mi) south of Dushanbe and 150 kilometres (93 mi) north of Kunduz, Afghanistan.

== Population ==
In 2019, the city's population was estimated at 110,800, making it the third-largest city in the country. The population fluctuates depending on the season, due to the many Tajik migrant workers in Russia.

Along with the capital Dushanbe, Bokhtar is more demographically diverse than the other major Tajik cities such as Khujand, Kulob or Istaravshan. Major ethnicities include Tajiks, Uzbeks, Russians, Pashtuns, Tatars, Ukrainians, Kazakhs and other Turkic peoples. The city had a large number of ethnic Russians who worked in the industrial and agricultural complexes in and around the city, during the existence of the Tajik Soviet Socialist Republic.

Bokhtar is a stronghold of Emomali Rahmon's political opponents.

== Overview ==
During the civil war in Tajikistan, Bokhtar (then Qurghonteppa) became the epicenter of conflict by the summer of 1992, and was seriously damaged. Many of the local Kulobi and Uzbeks were forced to flee in 1992, following attacks by the pro-opposition Gharmi forces.

The city was officially renamed from Qurghonteppa to Bokhtar on 22 January 2018. The name change was one of many in Tajikistan targeting places whose names derive from the Uzbek and Kyrgyz languages.

Near Bokhtar are the ruins of a Buddhist monastery complex called Ajina Tepe, believed to be built in the 7th or 8th centuries CE. It features a 12-meter-long image of Buddha in Nirvana.

Bokhtar International Airport provides flights to a handful of cities in Tajikistan, Russia and Kazakhstan.

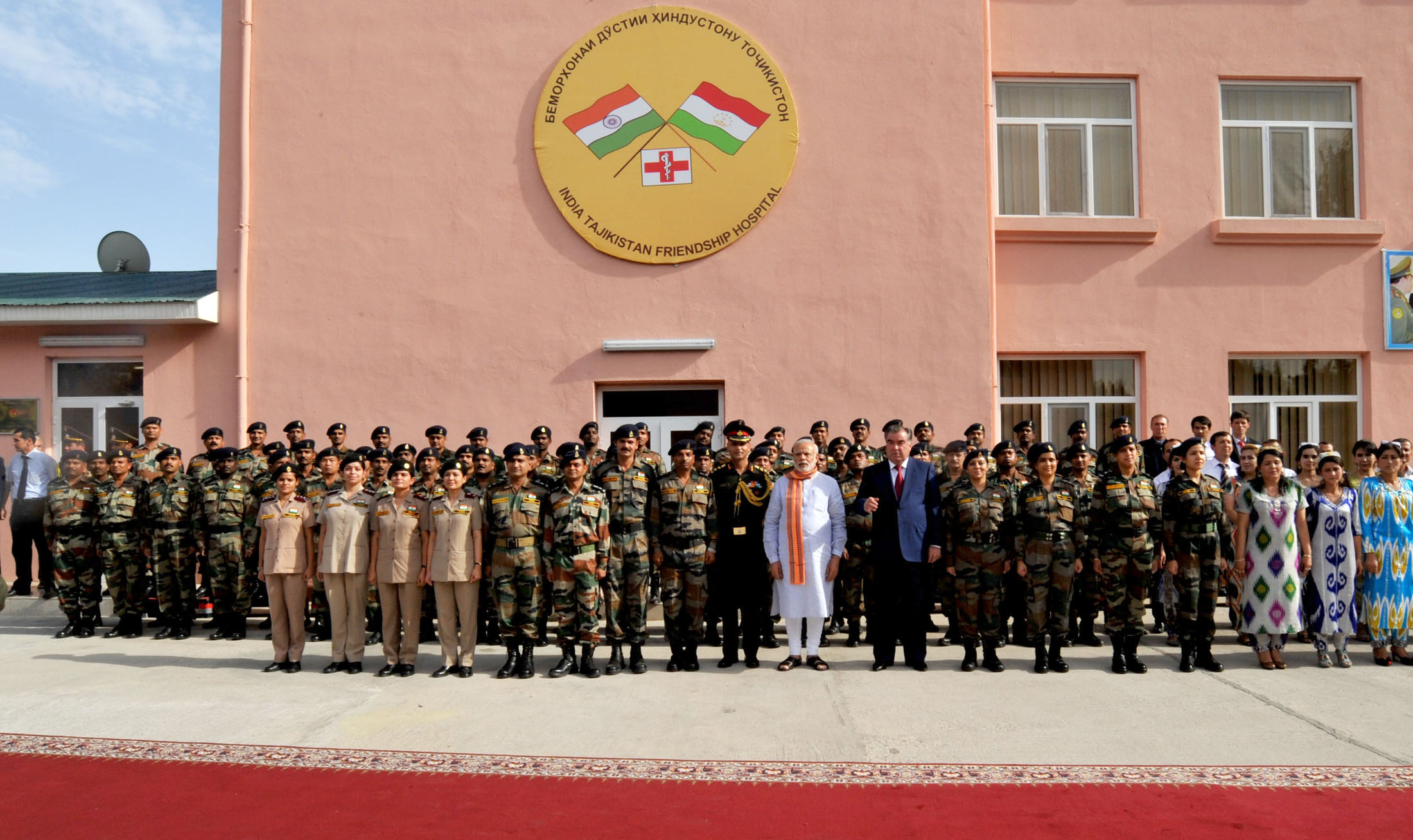
Indian Prime Minister Narendra Modi and President of Tajikistan Emomali Rahmon with personnel of the India-Tajik Friendship Hospital in Bokhtar, 13 July 2015.

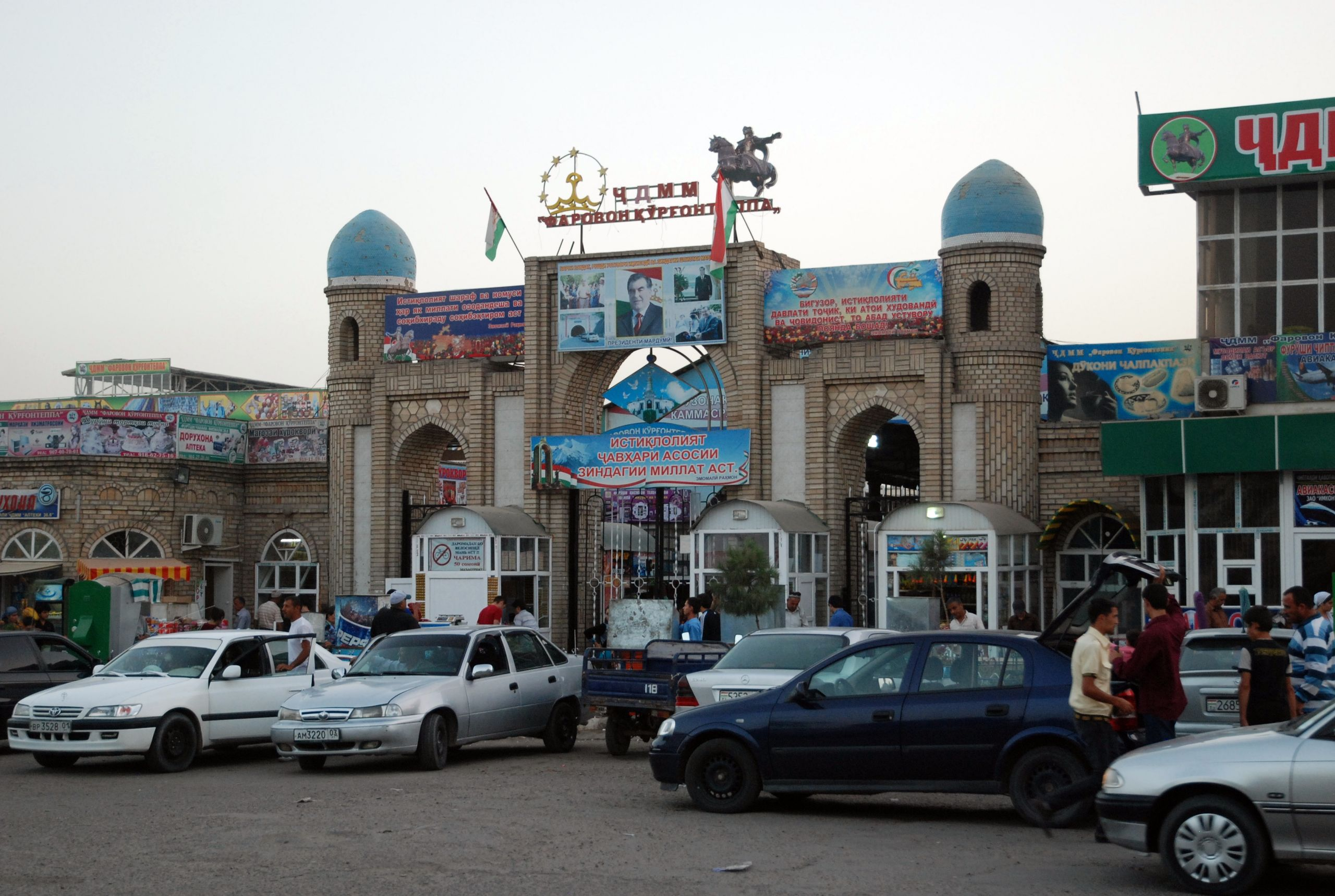
Bokhtar Bazaar

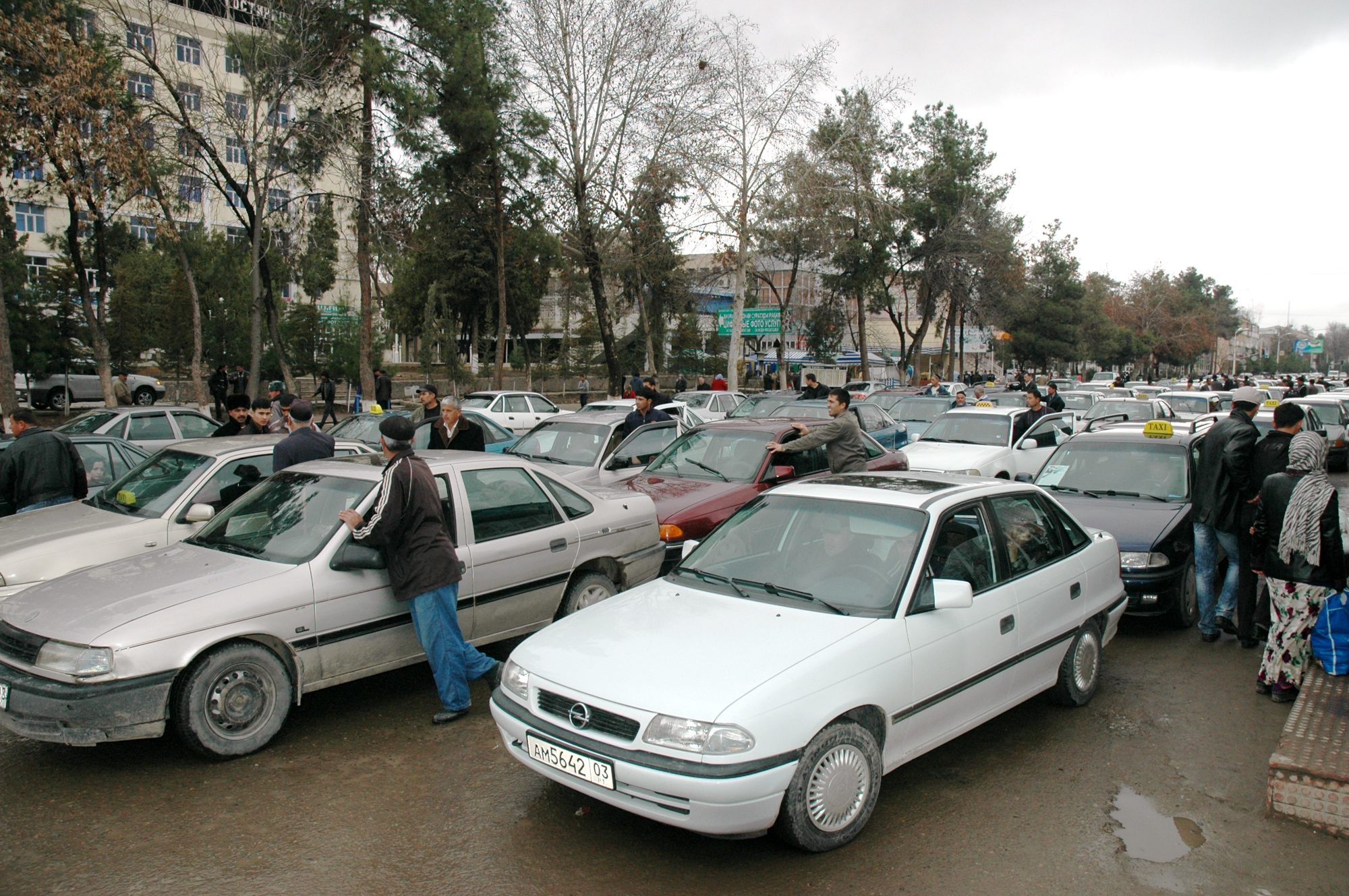
Taxi station in Bokhtar

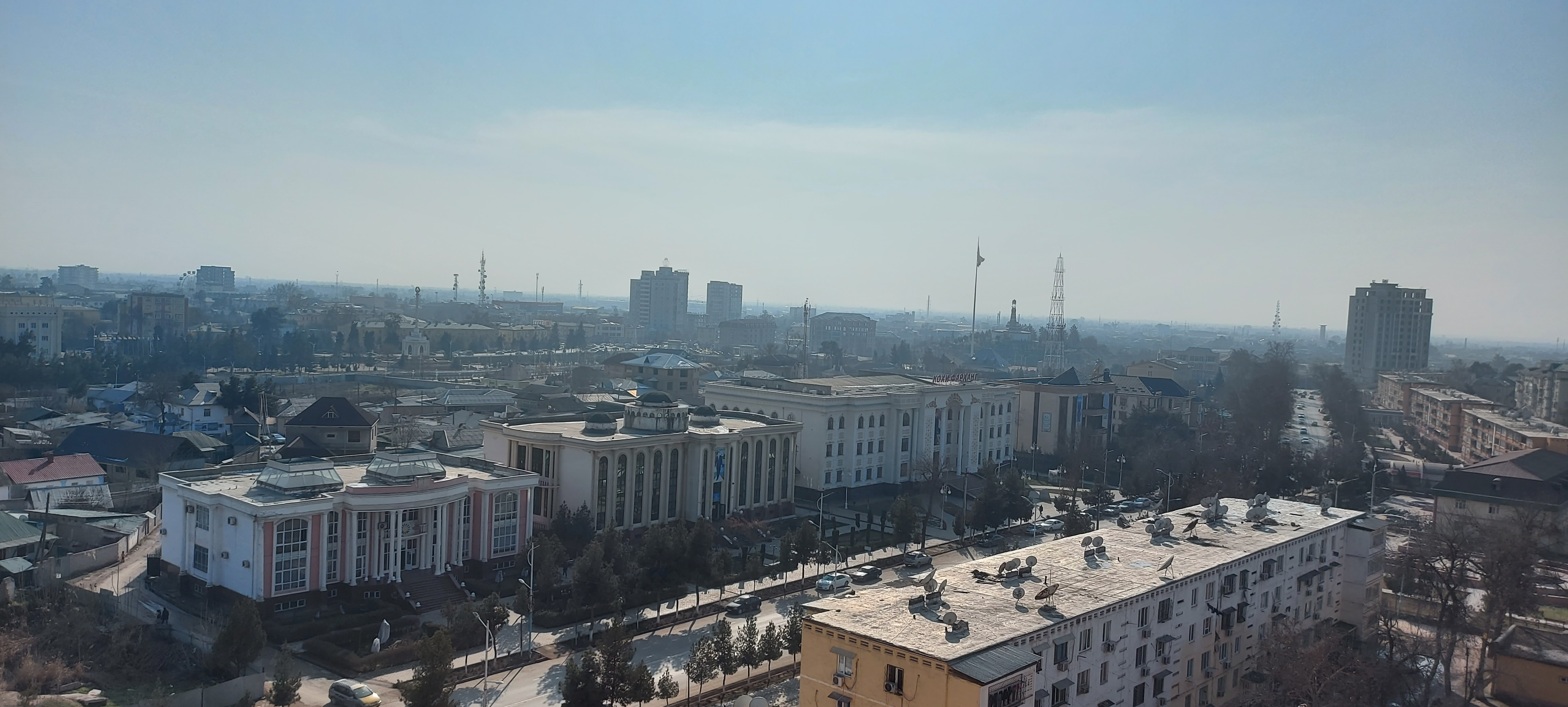
Bokhtar library

== Climate ==
Bokhtar has a cool semi-arid climate (Köppen BSk), with cool winters and very hot summers. Precipitation is quite low. It is highest in the spring, while summers are very dry.

Climate data for Bokhtar (1991–2020, extremes 1929–present)
Month	Jan	Feb	Mar	Apr	May	Jun	Jul	Aug	Sep	Oct	Nov	Dec	Year
Record high °C (°F)	24.0 (75.2)	28.8 (83.8)	35.3 (95.5)	37.0 (98.6)	41.3 (106.3)	43.6 (110.5)	46.0 (114.8)	42.8 (109.0)	40.2 (104.4)	38.1 (100.6)	31.3 (88.3)	24.3 (75.7)	46.0 (114.8)
Mean daily maximum °C (°F)	9.7 (49.5)	12.2 (54.0)	18.7 (65.7)	25.0 (77.0)	30.7 (87.3)	36.1 (97.0)	37.7 (99.9)	36.0 (96.8)	32.1 (89.8)	25.6 (78.1)	17.5 (63.5)	11.0 (51.8)	24.4 (75.9)
Daily mean °C (°F)	4.4 (39.9)	6.5 (43.7)	12.3 (54.1)	18.2 (64.8)	23.4 (74.1)	28.1 (82.6)	29.4 (84.9)	27.5 (81.5)	23.0 (73.4)	16.8 (62.2)	10.5 (50.9)	5.6 (42.1)	17.1 (62.9)
Mean daily minimum °C (°F)	0.6 (33.1)	2.2 (36.0)	7.4 (45.3)	12.5 (54.5)	16.7 (62.1)	20.2 (68.4)	21.5 (70.7)	19.5 (67.1)	15.0 (59.0)	10.1 (50.2)	5.5 (41.9)	1.7 (35.1)	11.1 (52.0)
Record low °C (°F)	−24.1 (−11.4)	−22.6 (−8.7)	−12.7 (9.1)	−5.6 (21.9)	4.0 (39.2)	9.1 (48.4)	11.0 (51.8)	9.4 (48.9)	3.5 (38.3)	−4.2 (24.4)	−10.9 (12.4)	−20.0 (−4.0)	−24.1 (−11.4)
Average precipitation mm (inches)	34 (1.3)	47 (1.9)	48 (1.9)	48 (1.9)	32 (1.3)	10 (0.4)	1 (0.0)	0.9 (0.04)	2 (0.1)	8 (0.3)	29 (1.1)	33 (1.3)	293 (11.5)
Average precipitation days (≥ 0.1 mm)	8.2	11.2	7.0	5.9	2.7	0.2	1.0	0.8	1.3	3.7	6.4	7.3	55.7
Average relative humidity (%)	73.2	70.1	62.3	57.6	50.2	45.5	45.6	48.3	51.0	57.1	66.6	73.0	58.4
Mean monthly sunshine hours	112	125	164	213	291	339	351	334	294	235	174	115	2,747
Source 1: Pogoda.ru.net, climatebase.ru (precipitation days, humidity)
Source 2: NOAA (sun only, 1961–1990)

== Notable people ==
- Sergei Mandreko (1971-2022) - football coach
- Nurudin N. Mukhitdinov (1959-) - politician

== Trivia ==
Finnish electronic duo Pan Sonic have a track entitled "Radio Qurghonteppa" on their 2010 farewell album Gravitoni.

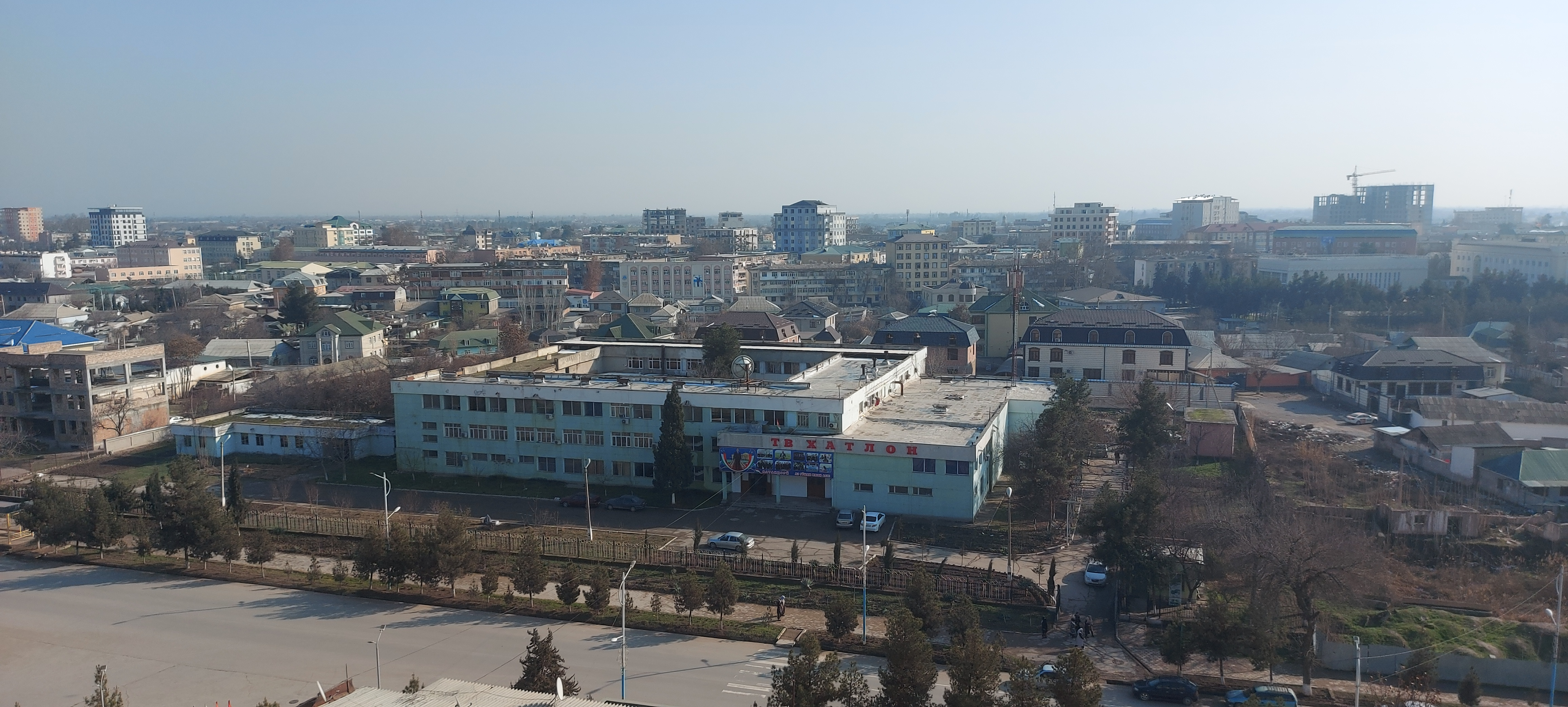
TV Khatlon

== See also ==
- List of cities in Tajikistan
- FC Khatlon football club
- Buddhistic cloister of Ajina-Tepa
