= Districts of Tajikistan =

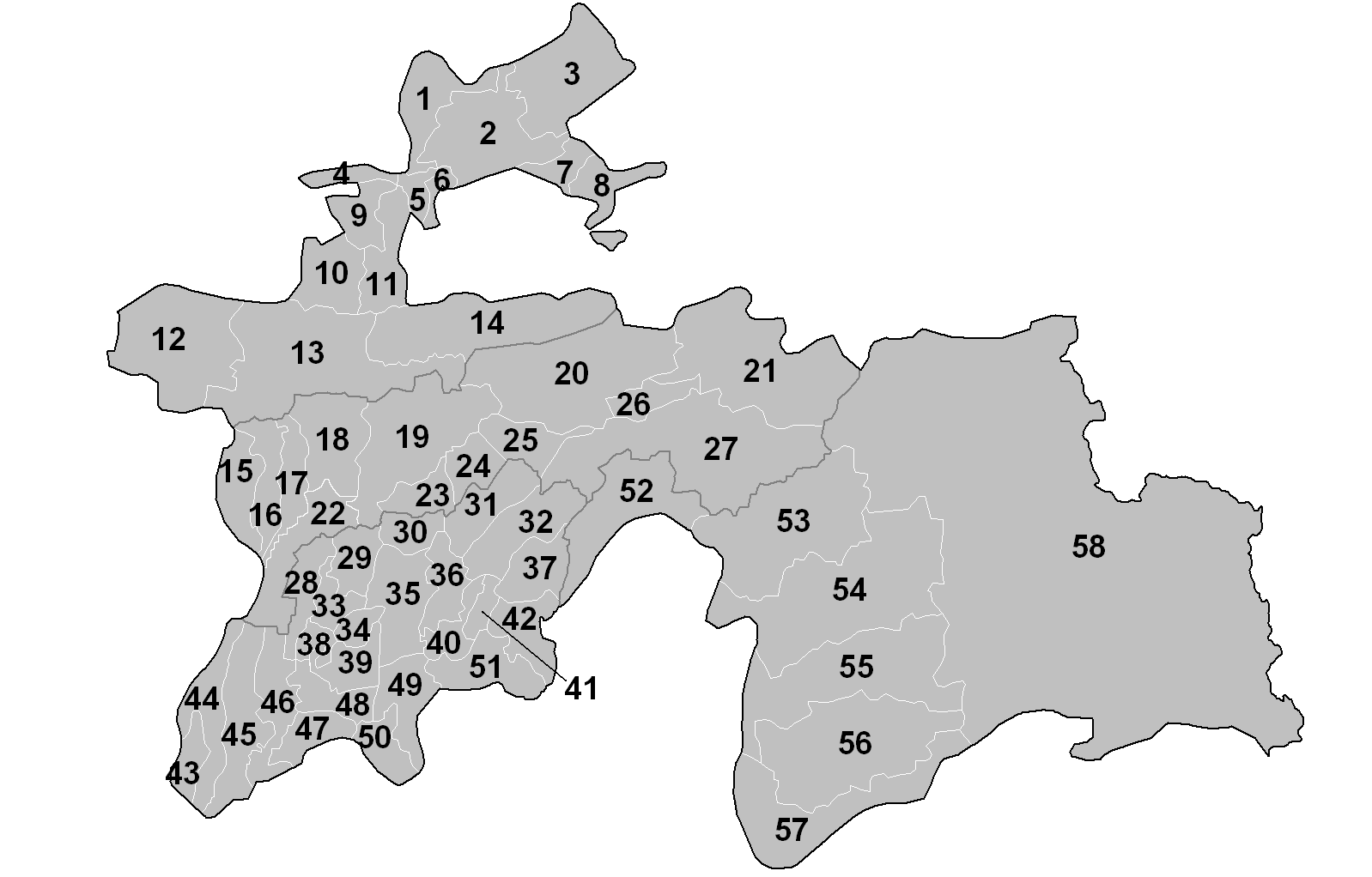
Districts of Tajikistan before 2017

As of 2020, the regions of Tajikistan are subdivided into 47 districts (Tajik: ноҳия, nohiya or Russian: район, rayon), not including 4 districts belonging to the capital city Dushanbe, and 18 cities of regional subordination (including Dushanbe, an extraregional capital city). Before ca. 2017, there were 58 districts. The districts are further subdivided into municipal units: either as urban municipalities called either as cities (Tajik: шаҳр, romanized: şahr, "cities") or towns (Tajik: шаҳрак, romanized: şahrak, "towns"), or as rural municipalities called jamoats (Tajik: ҷамоати деҳот, romanized: jamoati dehot, "village communes"), which in turn are further subdivided into villages (Tajik: деҳа or қишлоқ, romanized: deha or qyshloq, "villages/hamlets").

The numbering of the districts follows the map.

== Sughd Region ==
Districts:

| No. | District | Native name | Former names | Capital | Area in km^{2} | Population (2020 estim.) |
|---|---|---|---|---|---|---|
| 1 | Mastchoh | Мастчоҳ | Dilvarzin | Buston | 1,000 | 128,400 |
| 2 | Bobojon Ghafurov | Бобоҷон Ғафуров | Leninabad, Khodzhent | Ghafurov | 2,700 | 380,500 |
| 3 | Asht | Ашт | | Shaydon | 2,800 | 168,100 |
| 4 | Zafarobod | Зафаробод | | Zafarobod | 400 | 75,900 |
| 5 | Spitamen | Нов | Nau (until 2003) | Navkat | 400 | 141,600 |
| 6 | Jabbor Rasulov | Ҷаббор Расулов | Proletarsk | Mehrobod | 300 | 137,700 |
| 10 | Shahriston | Шаҳристон | | Shahriston | 1,100 | 43,700 |
| 11 | Devashtich | Ғончӣ | Ghonchi | Ghonchi | 1,600 | 173,500 |
| 13 | Ayni | Айнӣ | Zahmatobod | Ayni | 5,200 | 83,600 |
| 14 | Kuhistoni Mastchoh | Кӯҳистони Мастчоҳ | Dalyon | Mehron | 3,700 | 25,400 |

Cities of regional subordination:

| No. | City | Native name | Former names | Area in km^{2} | Population (2020 estim.) |
|---|---|---|---|---|---|
| 7 | Konibodom | Конибодом | | 800 | 211,100 |
| 8 | Isfara | Исфара | | 800 | 274,000 |
| 9 | Istaravshan | Истаравшан | Uroteppa (until 2000) | 700 | 273,500 |
| 12 | Panjakent | Панҷакент | | 3,700 | 303,000 |
| - | Khujand | Хуҷанд | Leninabad, Khojent | <100 | 183,600 |
| - | Istiqlol | Истиқлол | Taboshar | <100 | 17,900 |
| - | Guliston | Гулистон | Kayrakkum | <100 | 49,200 |
| - | Buston | Бустон | Chkalovsk | <100 | 36,900 |

== Areas of Republican Subordination ==
Districts:

| No. | District | Native name | Former names | Capital | Area in km^{2} | Population (2020 estim.) |
|---|---|---|---|---|---|---|
| 16 | Shahrinav | Шаҳринав | Qaratogh, Hisori Poyon | Shahrinav | 1,000 | 123,000 |
| 18 | Varzob | Варзоб | | Varzob | 1,700 | 82,200 |
| 20 | Rasht | Рашт | Gharm | Gharm | 4,600 | 127,400 |
| 21 | Lakhsh | Лахш | Jirgatol | Vahdat | 4,600 | 66,400 |
| 22 | Rudaki | Рӯдакӣ | Leninskiy (until 2003), Kuktosh, Loqay-Tojik | Somoniyon | 1,800 | 518,200 |
| 23 | Fayzobod | Файзобод | | Fayzobod | 900 | 103,600 |
| 25 | Nurobod | Дарбанд | Komsomolobod, Darband (until 2003) | Darband | 900 | 82,100 |
| 26 | Tojikobod | Тоҷикобод | Qalai Labi Ob | Tojikobod | 700 | 46,000 |
| 27 | Sangvor | Сангвор | Tavildara | Tavildara | 6,000 | 23,300 |

Cities of regional subordination:

| No. | City | Native name | Former names | Area in km^{2} | Population (2020 estim.) |
|---|---|---|---|---|---|
| - | Dushanbe | Душанбе | Stalinabad | 126.6 | 846,400 |
| 15 | Tursunzoda | Турсунзода | Regar (renamed between 1979 and 1989) | 1,200 | 298,800 |
| 17 | Hisor | Ҳисор | | 1,000 | 308,100 |
| 19 | Vahdat | Ваҳдат | Yangibazar (1927-1936), Ordzhonikidzeabad (1936-1992), Kofarnihon (1992-2003) | 3,700 | 342,700 |
| 24 | Roghun | Роғун | Obigarm | 500 | 44,100 |

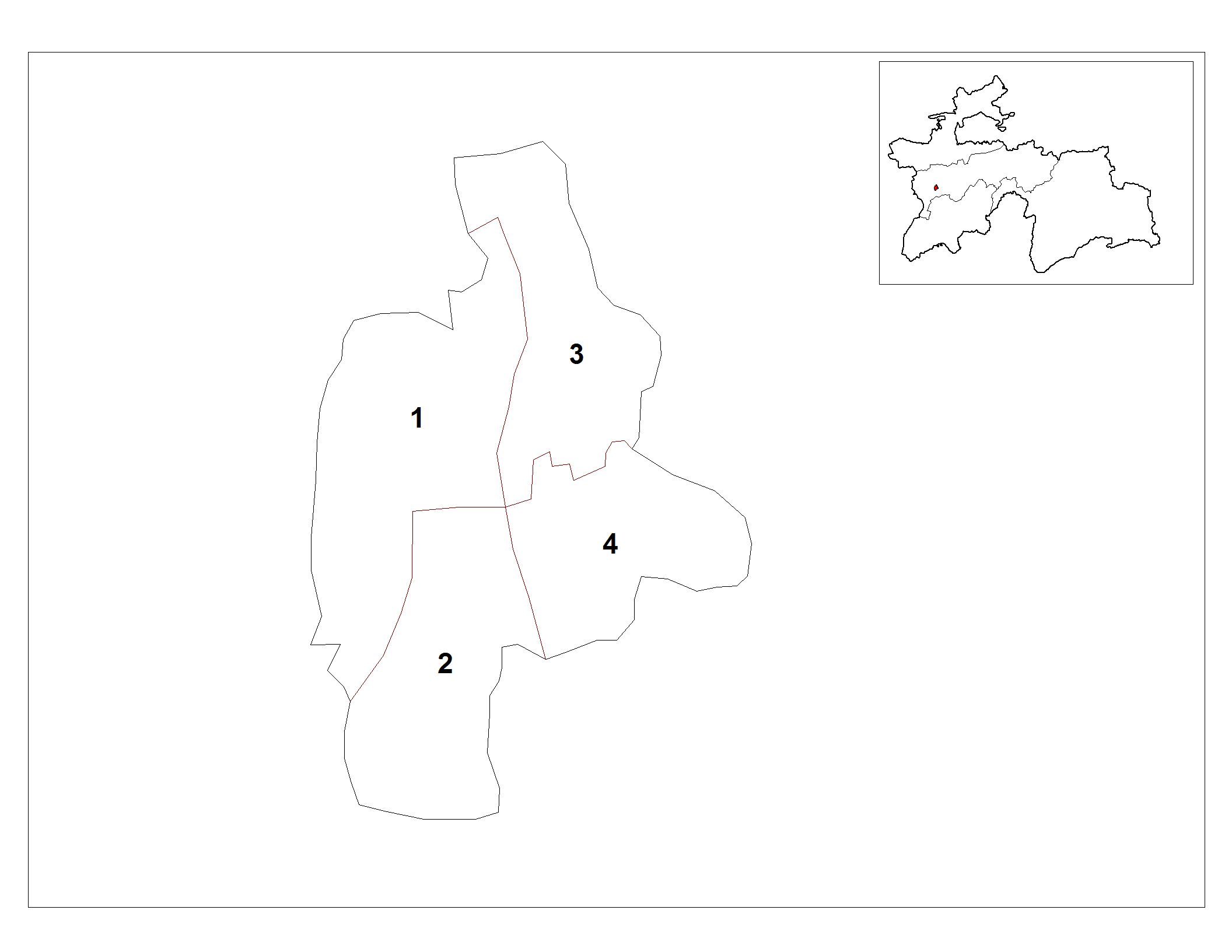
Districts of Dushanbe.

=== City districts of Dushanbe ===
| No. | District | Native name | Former names | Area in km^{2} | Popular (est. 2019) |
| 1 | Ibn Sina | Сино | Frunze | 43,8 | 326 100 |
| 2 | Firdavsi | Фирдавсӣ | Central | 29,1 | 209 000 |
| 3 | Ismail Somoni | Исмоили Сомонӣ | Oktyabrskiy (October) | 25,8 | 148 700 |
| 4 | Shohmansur | Шоҳмансур | Zheleznodorozhnyi (Railway) | 27,9 | 162 600 |

== Khatlon Region ==
Districts:

| No. | District | Native name | Former names | Capital | Area in km^{2} | Population (2020 estim.) |
|---|---|---|---|---|---|---|
| 28 | Khuroson | Хуросон | Ghozimalik | Obikiik | 900 | 116,500 |
| 29 | Yovon | Ёвон | | Yovon | 900 | 234,600 |
| 31 | Baljuvon | Балҷувон | Sarikhosor | Baljuvon | 1,300 | 30,400 |
| 32 | Khovaling | Ховалинг | | Khovaling | 1,700 | 57,900 |
| 33 | Jomi | Абдураҳмони Ҷомӣ | Kuybyshevsk, Dzhami, Khojamaston | Abdurahmoni Jomi | 600 | 175,800 |
| 35 | Danghara | Данғара | | Danghara | 2,000 | 161,000 |
| 36 | Temurmalik | Темурмалик | Qizil-Mazor (until 1957), Sovetskiy (until 2004) | Bahmanrud | 1,000 | 69,800 |
| 37 | Mu'minobod | Мӯминобод | Leningradskiy | Mu'minobod | 900 | 94,700 |
| 38 | Kushoniyon | Кӯшониён | Bokhtar | Ismoili Somoni | 600 | 245,900 |
| 39 | Vakhsh | Вахш | Qurghonteppa | Vakhsh | 1,000 | 199,300 |
| 40 | Vose' | Восеъ | Aral | Vose' | 800 | 216,500 |
| 42 | Shamsiddin Shohin | Шамсиддин Шоҳин | Shuroobod | Shuroobod | 2,300 | 55,500 |
| 43 | Nosiri Khusrav | Носири Хусрав | Beshkent | Bahori | 800 | 39,300 |
| 44 | Shahritus | Шаҳритус | | Shahritus | 1,500 | 130,000 |
| 45 | Qubodiyon | Қубодиён | | Qubodiyon | 1,800 | 188,100 |
| 46 | Dusti | Дӯстӣ | Jilikul | Jilikul | 1,200 | 117,100 |
| 47 | Jayhun | Ҷайҳун | Qumsangir, Molotovobod | Dusti | 1,000 | 139,000 |
| 48 | Jaloliddin Balkhi | Ҷалолиддин Балхӣ | Kolkhozobod (until 23 June 2007), Rumi | Balkh | 900 | 201,300 |
| 49 | Farkhor | Фархор | | Farkhor | 1,200 | 170,800 |
| 50 | Panj | Панҷ | Saroy-Kamar, Kirovobod | Panj | 900 | 119,700 |
| 51 | Hamadoni | Ҳамадонӣ | Moskovskiy | Moskovskiy | 500 | 148,800 |

Cities of regional subordination:

| No. | City | Native name | Former names | Area in km^{2} | Population (2020 estim.) |
|---|---|---|---|---|---|
| - | Bokhtar | Бохтар | Qurghonteppa | <100 | 111,800 |
| 30 | Norak | Норак | | 400 | 61,500 |
| 34 | Levakant | Левакант | Kalininabad, Sarband | 100 | 48,300 |
| 41 | Kulob | Кӯлоб | | 300 | 214,700 |

== Gorno-Badakhshan Autonomous Region ==
Districts:

| No. | District | Native name | Former names | Capital | Area in km^{2} | Population (2020 estim.) |
|---|---|---|---|---|---|---|
| 52 | Darvoz | Дарвоз | Qala'i-Khumb | Qal'ai Khumb | 2,800 | 24,000 |
| 53 | Vanj | Ванҷ | Rokharv | Vanj | 4,400 | 34,400 |
| 54 | Rushon | Рӯшон | | Rushon | 5,900 | 25,800 |
| 55 | Shughnon | Шуғнон | | Khorugh | 4,600 | 38,000 |
| 56 | Roshtqala | Роштқалъа | | Roshtqal'a | 4,300 | 27,400 |
| 57 | Ishkoshim | Ишкошим | Vakhan | Ishkoshim | 3,700 | 32,900 |
| 58 | Murghob | Мурғоб | Vostochno-Pamirskiy | Murghob | 37,300 | 15,900 |

City of regional subordination:

| No. | City | Native name | Former names | Area in km^{2} | Population (2020 estim.) |
|---|---|---|---|---|---|
| - | Khorugh | Хоруғ | | <100 | 30,500 |
