= Palace of the Governor of Khulbuk =

Ancient palace in Tajikistan

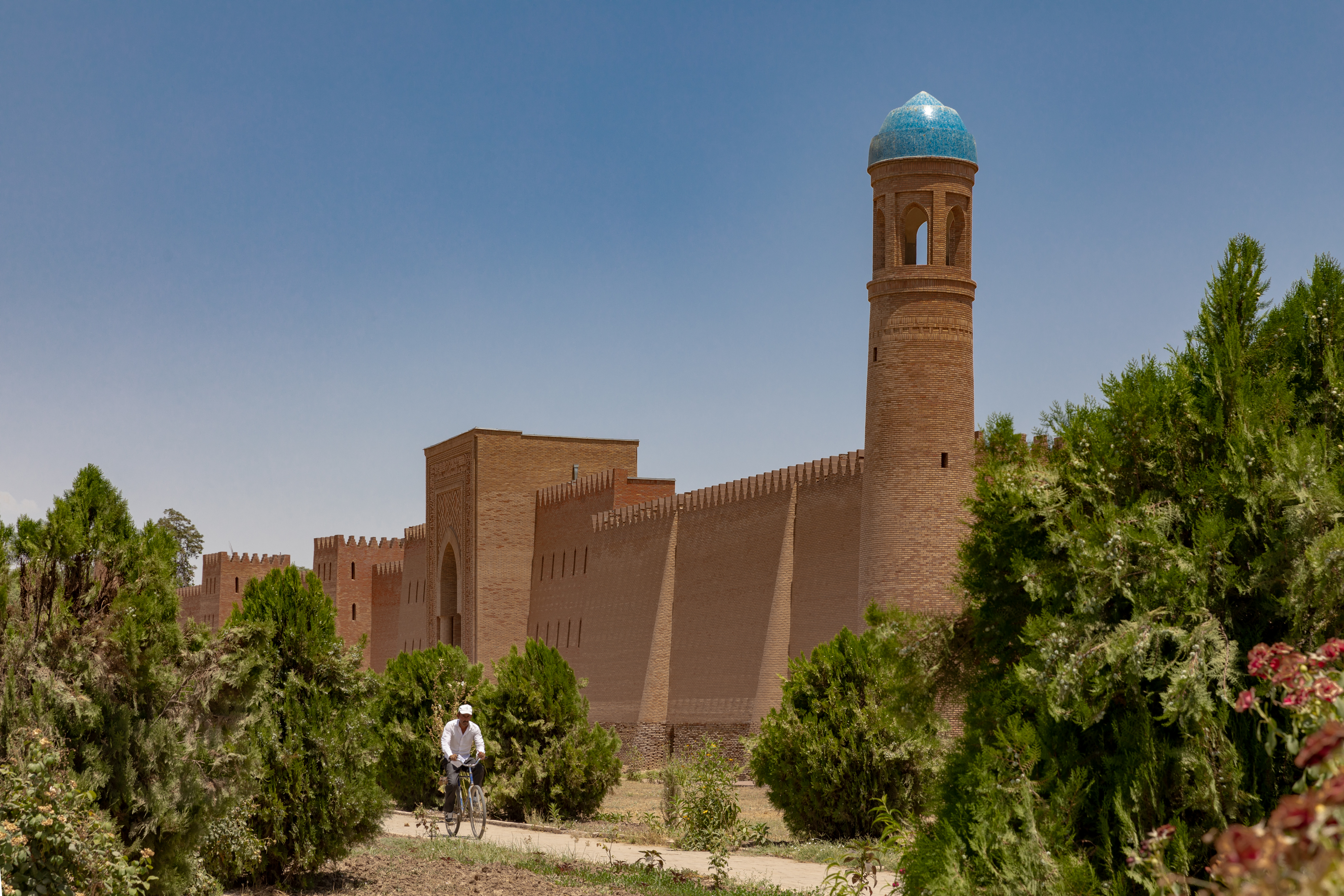
Image of the palace complex

The Palace of the Governor of Khulbuk (37°46′39″N 69°33′23″E) is located in the center of village of Kurban-Shaid in the city of Vose in the Khatlon Region of Tajikistan. The palace was situated in the south-west part of the ancient town of Khisht-Tepa. Khulbuk was a center of the Huttal Region in 9th-12th centuries CE. The site has been proposed to be put on the World Heritage list of sites that have "outstanding universal value" to the world.
