= Vakhsh, Tajikistan =

Vakhsh
- Location in Tajikistan
- Coordinates: 37°42′39″N 68°49′52″E
- Country: Tajikistan
- Region: Khatlon
- District: Vakhsh
- Elevation: 426 m (1,398 ft)

Population (2020)
  - Total: 14,900

Vakhsh (Tajik: Вахш, Russian: Вахш) is a city in southwestern Tajikistan. It is the capital of Vakhsh District. The population of the town is 14,900 (January 2020 estimate).

It is about 100 km (62 mi) from the capital, Dushanbe. It has one of the three Catholic Tajik churches under the Mission sui iuris of Tajikistan.

== See also ==
- Vakhsh Range
- Vakhsh (river)
