= Temurmalik District =

Temurmalik District (Russian: Темурмаликский район) (Tajik: Ноҳияи Темурмалик)
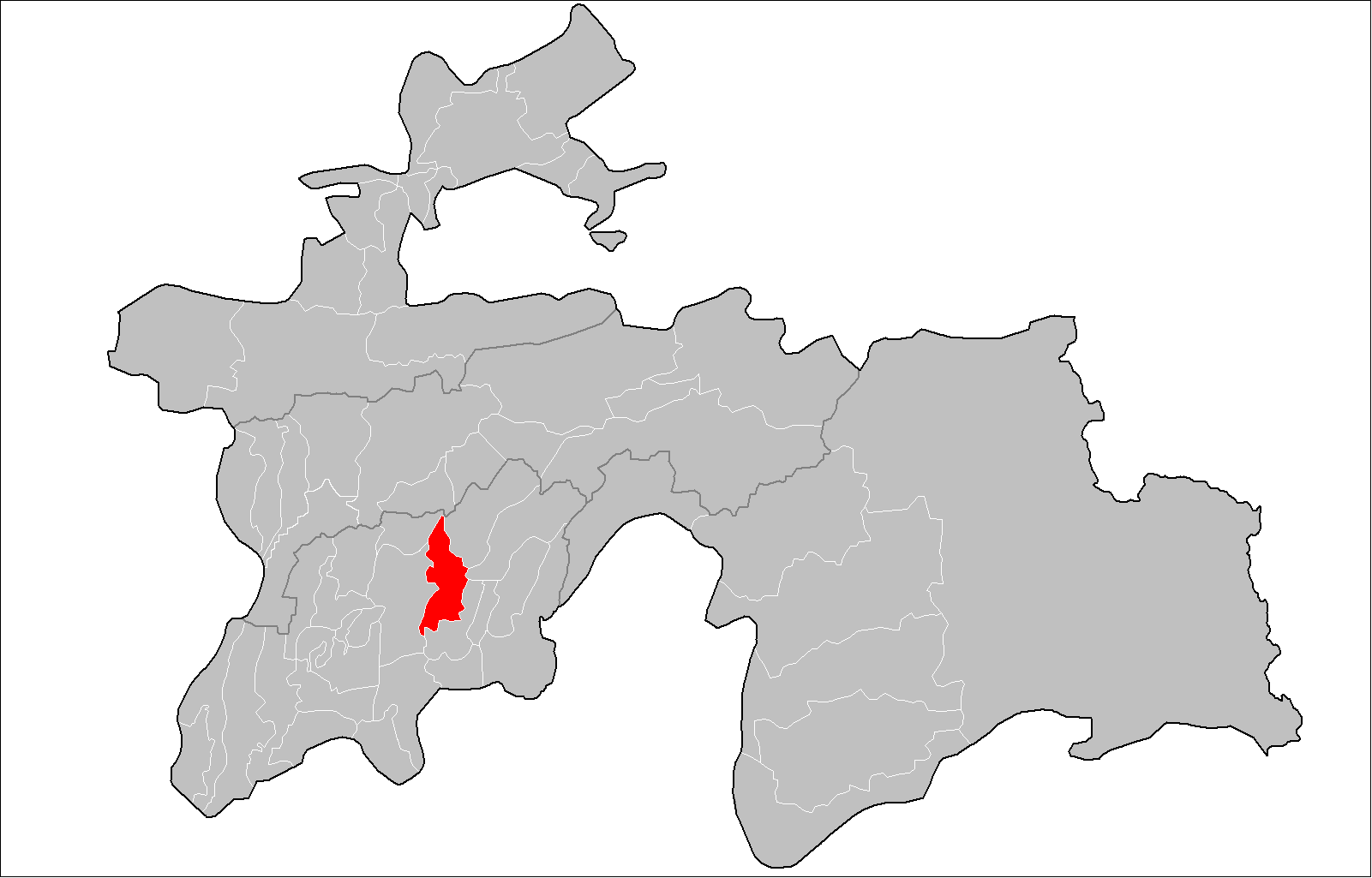
- Location of the district in Tajikistan
- Coordinates: 38°11′N 69°33′E
- Country: Tajikistan
- Region: Khatlon Region
- Capital: Bahmanrud

Area
  - Total: 1,000 km^{2} (390 sq mi)

Population (2020)
  - Total: 69,800
  - Density: 70/km^{2} (180/sq mi)
- Time zone: UTC+5
- Official languages: Russian (Interethnic); Tajik (State)

Temurmalik District (Russian: Темурмаликский район; Tajik: Ноҳияи Темурмалик Nohiyai Temurmalik) is a district in the Khatlon Region of Tajikistan, located south of the Vakhsh Range along the middle course of the river Kyzylsu. It had an estimated population of 69,800 as of 2020. Before 1957, it was called Qizil-Mazor District (Tajik: Ноҳияи Қизил Мазор) or Kzyl-Mazar District (Russian: Кзыл-Мазарский район), then renamed Sovetskiy District (Russian: Советский район), and in 2004 given its present name Temurmalik District. The new name honors a medieval military hero, Timur Malik, who in 1220 led the people of Khujand in their struggle against the Mongol occupation.

In 2012, Tajikistan experienced one of the harshest winters in 50 years resulting in major flooding as the snow melted. Kiblay Village in the Temurmalik District was one of the most heavily damaged areas within Tajikistan as a result of the floods.

== Administrative divisions ==
The district has an area of about 1,000 km^{2} (400 sq mi) and is divided administratively into one town and six jamoats. They are as follows:

Jamoat	Population (Jan. 2015)
Bahmanrud (town)	9,900
Chilchah	8,664
Kangurt	9,430
Kushkteppa	8,113
Husaynobod	7,224
Saidmu'min Rahimov (Vatan)	
Tanobchi	7,454
