= Vehicle registration plates of Tajikistan =

Republic of Tajikistan
- 2014 series of Tajik vehicle registration plates.
- Country: Tajikistan
- Country code: TJ

Current series
- Size: 520 mm × 110 mm 20.5 in × 4.3 in
- Serial format: 1234AB56 (56 being the regional code)
- Colour (front): Black on white
- Colour (rear): Black on white

Tajik vehicle registration plates are registration plates for vehicles registered in the country.

== History ==
For the first time, numbers on cars in Tajikistan appeared during the entry of Tajikistan into the USSR . From that time until 1996, Soviet-style license plates belonging to the Tajik SSR were used in the country .

In 1996, license plates of their own design were introduced in Tajikistan, made in the image and likeness of license plates of the Russian Federation .

In 2009–2010, new license plates began to be issued in Tajikistan, which differed markedly from the previous ones. At the same time, new types of numbers appeared, for example, for public transport and for vehicles of the Ministry of Internal Affairs.

In April 2014, license plates changed slightly – the size of the letters became equal to the size of the numbers, and a chip appeared under the TJ code.

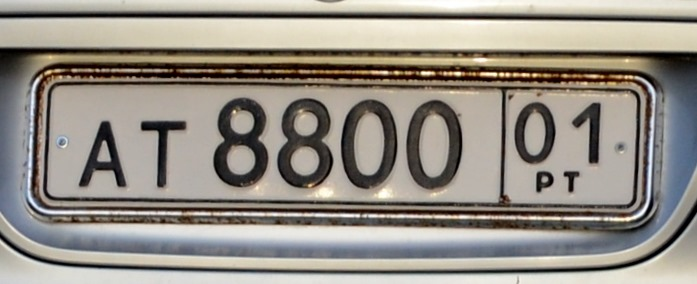
Vehicle registration plate of Tajikistan (previous format from 1996)

== Codes ==
Oblast (Viloyat)	Code
Dushanbe	01
Sughd Oblast (incl. Khujand)	02
Khatlon Oblast (incl. Kurgan-Tube)	03
Gorno-Badakhshan Autonomous Oblast (incl. Khorog)	04
Dushanbe	05
Sughd Oblast (incl. Khujand)	06
Districts of Republican Subordination	07
Districts of Republican Subordination	08

== Vehicle Registration Plates of the Tajik Soviet Socialist Republic ==
For the first time, numbers on cars in Tajikistan appeared during the entry of Tajikistan into the USSR . From that time until 1996, Soviet-style license plates belonging to the Tajik SSR were used in the country .

Soviet Oblast in 1980	Suffix
Gorno-Badakhshan Autonomous Oblast	ГБ
Dushanbe	ДБ
Kulob	КЮ
Leninabad	ЛБ
Stalinabad	СБ
Kurgan-Tyube	ТД
Khatlon	ХТ

== Vehicle Registration Plates of Independent Tajikistan ==
In 1996, license plates of their own design were introduced in Tajikistan, made in the image and likeness of license plates of the Russian Federation .

In 2009–2010, new license plates began to be issued in Tajikistan, which differed markedly from the previous ones. At the same time, new types of numbers appeared, for example, for public transport and for vehicles of the Ministry of Internal Affairs.

In April 2014, license plates changed slightly – the size of the letters became equal to the size of the numbers, and a chip appeared under the TJ code.

== Private / Individual Vehicle registration plates ==
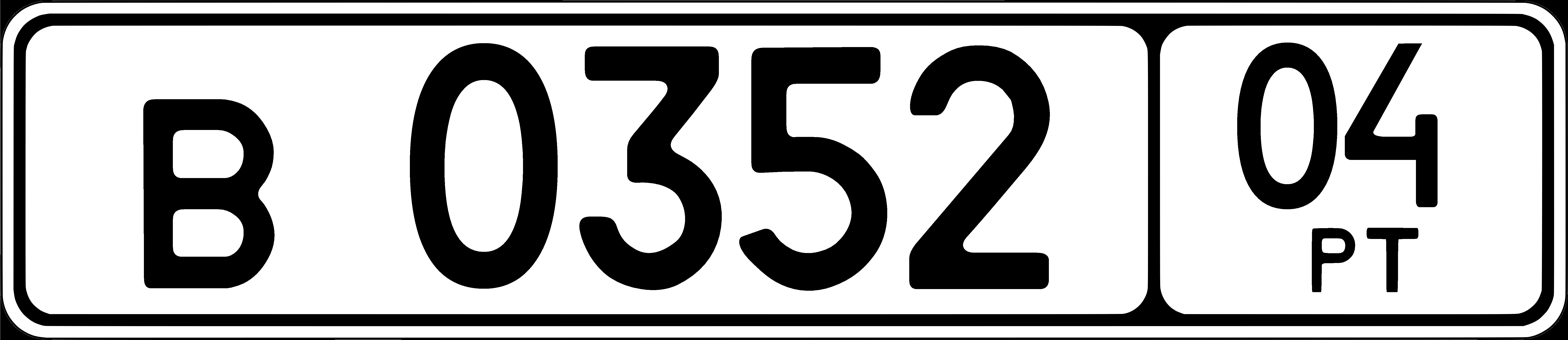
1996 series of Tajik private vehicle registration plates.

=== 1996 Series ===
The modern Russian number was taken as a sample of the first Tajik numbers with the only difference – in the window of regional affiliation, instead of the code "RUS" and the Russian flag, the letter combination "RT" was written in small letters, there was no flag.

2009 series of Tajik private vehicle registration plates.

=== 2009/2014 Series ===
The new license plates are significantly different from those previously issued. The flag of the Republic of Tajikistan and the country code "TJ" (in Latin letters) appeared on the registration plates, the region code was no longer written in a separate window, the elements of license plates were swapped.

2014 series of Tajik private vehicle registration plates.

For the letters, as in the previous format, letters of the Tajik Cyrillic alphabet are used, but only those that look similar to a Latin letter, namely: A, B, E, K, M, H, O, P, C, T, X. Since 2014 the plates also use the Latin letters D, J, Z and Y.

The plate design is black characters on a white background. On the left, the state flag of the Republic of Tajikistan is applied, under which the country code “TJ” is written, followed by four digits, two smaller letters and two digits indicating the region of registration. A two-row license plate has also been developed, where four numbers are placed in the top row, and letters and the region code in the bottom row, which however has only been issued on trailers. Since 2014, the size of letters and numbers is the same.

=== License Plate Fonts ===
The 1996 Series uses the registration plate font of the Russian standard.

The 2009 Series uses a mix of registration plate fonts. The numbers are of the Polish standard whereas the letters are of the Russian standard.

The 2014 Series uses the registration plate font of the Polish standard.

== Legal Entity / Organizational Vehicle registration plates ==
=== 1996 Series ===
1996 series of Tajik legal entity registration plates.

The series differs from the format of plates of private individuals in that the letter is placed after the numbers in the serial.

=== 2009/2014 Series ===
2009 series of Tajik legal entity registration plates

2013 series of Tajik legal entity registration plates

The plate design is black characters on a white background. The number of individuals differs from the format by the presence of only three digits at the beginning of the number. Since 2014, the size of letters and numbers is the same.

== Trailer registration plates ==
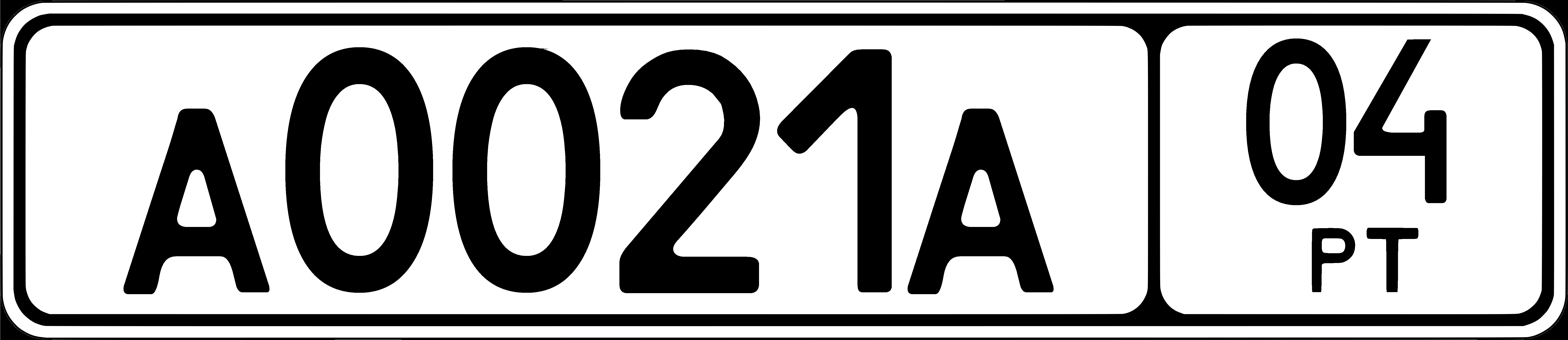
1996 series of Tajik trailer registration plates

=== 1996 Series ===
The 1996 series differs from the format of numbers of private individuals in that there was an extra letter after the numbers (A1111A 11)

=== 2009/2014 Series ===
2009 series of Tajik trailer registration plates

The plate design is black characters on a white background; the sign is a square two-row. In the top row, the state flag of the Republic of Tajikistan is applied, under which the car code “TJ” is written, followed by two numbers of the registration region and two letters; the bottom row contains four digits. Since 2014, the appearance of the number has changed: now there are four digits in the top row, and two letters and two digits of the region in the bottom row, the size of letters and numbers is the same.

2014 series of Tajik trailer registration plates

== Motorcycle registration plates ==
1996 series of Tajik motorcycle registration plates

=== 1996 Series ===
Almost identical to the corresponding Russian standard, only the region number is not written in a separate window, the combination "RT" is missing.

=== 2009/2014 Series ===
2009 series of Tajik motorcycle registration plates

The plate design is black characters on a white background; the sign is a square two-row. In the top row, the state flag of the Republic of Tajikistan is applied, under which the car code “TJ” is written, followed by three digits; in the bottom row there is a letter and two numbers of the region of registration.

== Public Transport registration plates ==
2009 series of Tajik public transport registration plates

=== 2009/2014 Series ===
Public Transport registration plates began being issued in 2009.

The plate design is black characters on an orange background. The format of the number matches the format of individuals, only the letter combination "TT" is used as letters. Since 2014, the size of letters and numbers is the same.

2014 series of Tajik public transport registration plates.

== Transit vehicle registration plates ==
1996 series of Tajik transit plates NO SET DESIGN

=== 1996 Series ===
These are Identical to the old Russian transits, only the word "Tranzit" is written in Latin.

=== 2009 Series ===
2009/2014 series of Tajik transit plates – NO SET DESIGN

Reminiscent of modern Russian transit numbers, but mirrored. On the left, in a separate window, information is applied in black on yellow in 2 rows: the top row is the registration region code and the combination “ TJ ”, the bottom row is the word “ tranzit ”. In the rest of the letter, four numbers and one more letter are applied in black and white. Since 2014, the appearance of the sign has changed slightly: the first letter has become the same size as the numbers, and the flag of Tajikistan has been drawn above the last letter. See notes.

=== NOTES ===
Transit registration plates in Tajikistan are produced with no set standard and the manufacturer of the plates will make a simple but legal copy. Often printed on paper.

== Other vehicle registration plates ==
=== This section will contain a table of special license plate types of Tajikistan. This is compiled from the 1996 and 2009/2014 formats. ===
Image of License Plate	Name of License Plate Type	1996 Series?	2009/2014 Series?
	Police Vehicle registration plate	NO (No samples)	YES
	M = Vehicle owned by foreign entity N = Vehicle owned by foreign citizen P = Vehicle intended for export	YES	NO (White on blue)
	D = Vehicle of diplomatic employee S = Vehicle of non-diplomatic Employee CMD = Vehicle of Head Diplomat	YES	YES
	Military Vehicle registration plate	YES	YES
	Government Vehicle registration plate	YES	YES
