= Zafar, Tajikistan =

Zafar
- Jamoat
- Location within Tajikistan
- Coordinates: 37°39′N 69°24′E
- Country: Tajikistan
- Region: Khatlon
- District: Farkhor District

Population (2015)
  - Total: 13,885
- Time zone: UTC+5 (TJT)
- Official languages: Russian (Interethnic); Tajik (State)

Zafar (Russian and Tajik: Зафар, Persian: ظفر) is a jamoat in Tajikistan. It is located in Farkhor District in Khatlon Region. The jamoat has a total population of 13,885 (2015).
