= Darqad =

- Village and Jamoat
- Location within Tajikistan
- Coordinates: 37°30′N 69°25′E
- Country: Tajikistan
- Region: Khatlon
- District: Farkhor District

Population (2015)
  - Total: 14,503
- Time zone: UTC+5 (TJT)
- Official languages: Russian (Interethnic); Tajik (State)

Darqad (Tajik: Дарқад, Persian: درغد) is a village and jamoat in Tajikistan. It is located in Farkhor District in Khatlon Region. The jamoat has a total population of 14,503 (2015).
