= Sarvati Istiqlol =

Sarvati Istiqlol Russian: Сарвати Истиклол Tajik: Сарвати Истиқлол
- Jamoat
- Location within Tajikistan
- Coordinates: 37°49′N 68°43′E
- Country: Tajikistan
- Region: Khatlon Region
- District: Kushoniyon District

Population (2015)
  - Total: 33,071
- Time zone: UTC+5 (TJT)
- Official languages: Russian (Interethnic); Tajik (State)

Sarvati Istiqlol (Tajik: Сарвати Истиқлол, formerly: Kalinin) is a jamoat in Tajikistan. It is located in Kushoniyon District in Khatlon Region. The jamoat has a total population of 33,071 (2015).
