= Dehqonobod, Farkhor District =

Dehqonobod
- Jamoat
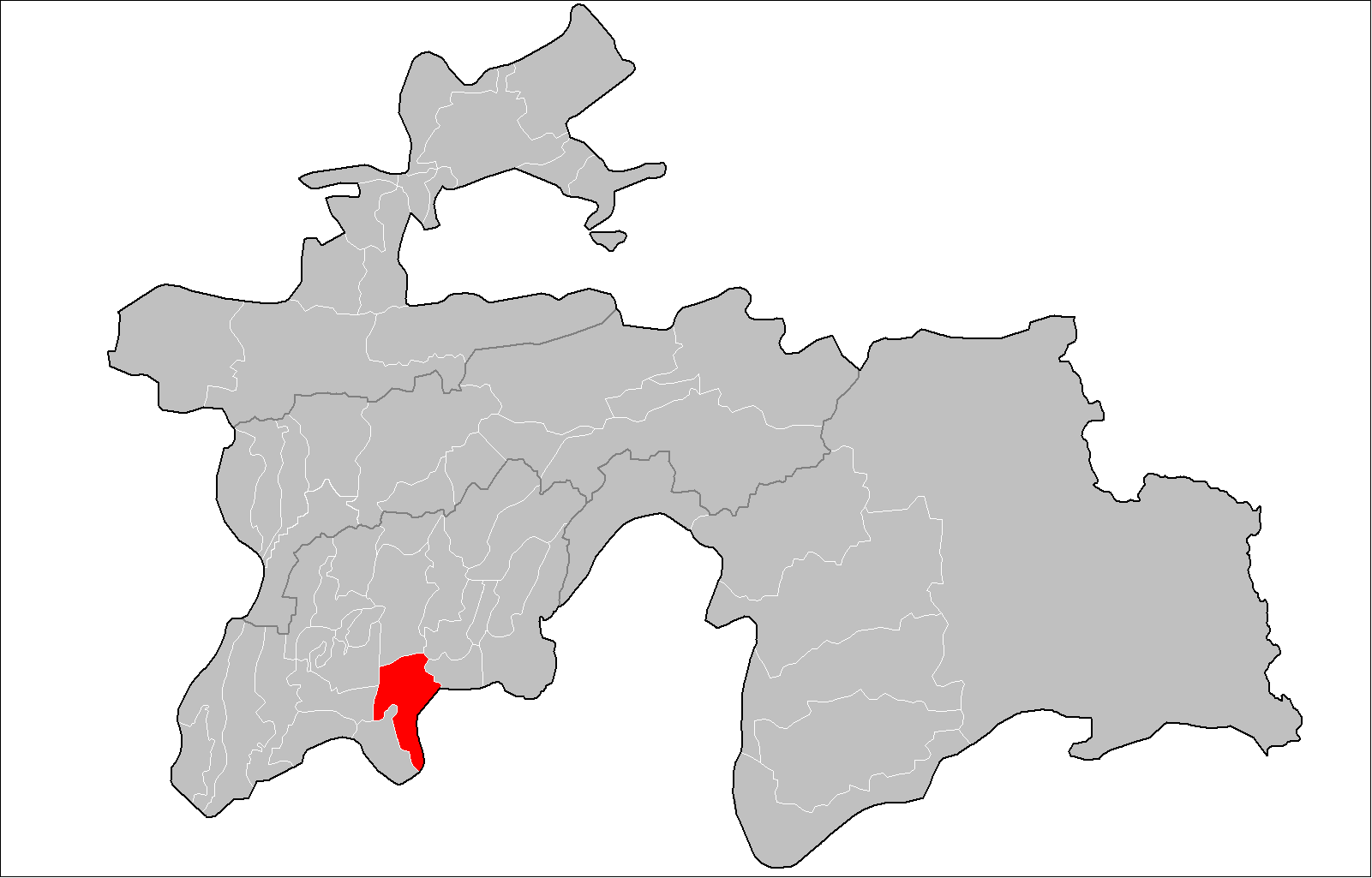

- Location within Tajikistan
- Coordinates: 37°38′N 69°27′E
- Country: Tajikistan
- Region: Khatlon
- District: Farkhor District

Population (2015)
  - Total: 12,327
- Time zone: UTC+5 (TJT)
- Official languages: Russian (Interethnic); Tajik (State)

Dehqonobod (formerly Dehqonariq; Tajik: Деҳқонобод) is a jamoat in Tajikistan. It is located in Farkhor District in Khatlon Region. The jamoat has a total population of 12,327 (2015).
