= Zargar, Tajikistan =

Zargar
- Village and Jamoat
- Location within Tajikistan
- Coordinates: 37°48′N 68°39′E
- Country: Tajikistan
- Region: Khatlon
- District: Kushoniyon District

Population (2015)
  - Total: 49,235
- Time zone: UTC+5 (TJT)
- Official languages: Russian (Interethnic); Tajik (State) (Note: Constitution of Tajikistan)

Zargar (Russian and Tajik: Заргар, Persian: زرگر) is a village and jamoat in Tajikistan. It is located in Kushoniyon District in Khatlon Region. The jamoat has a total population of 49,235 (2015).
