= Vatan, Farkhor District =

Vatan
- Jamoat
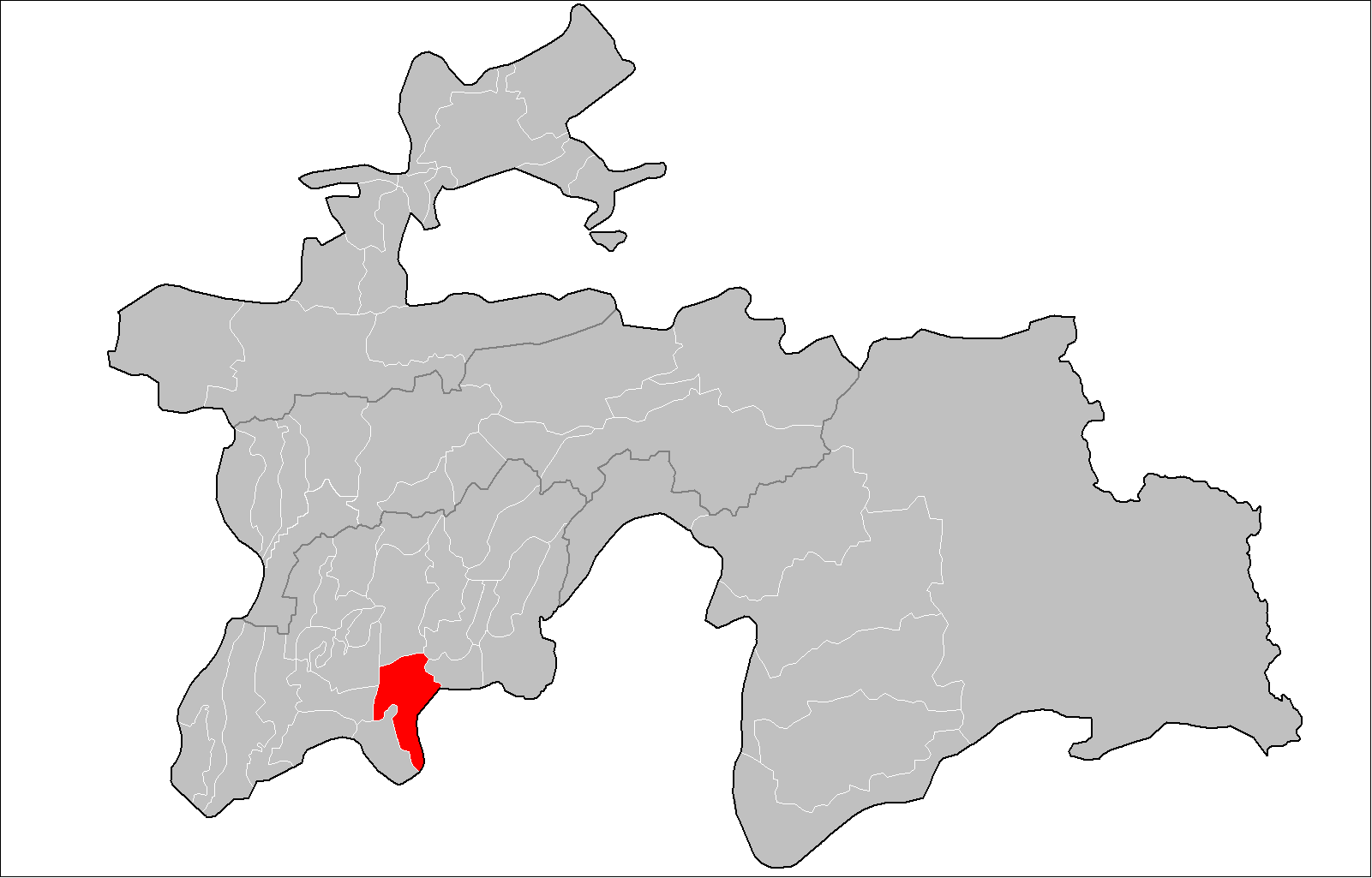
- Location of Farkhor District relative to Tajikistan

- Location within Tajikistan
- Coordinates: 37°34′N 69°22′E
- Country: Tajikistan
- Region: Khatlon
- District: Farkhor District

Population (2015)
  - Total: 23,123
- Time zone: UTC+5 (TJT)
- Official languages: Russian (Interethnic); Tajik (State)

Vatan (Russian and Tajik: Ватан, Persian: وطن) is a jamoat in Tajikistan. It is located in Farkhor District in Khatlon Region. The jamoat has a total population of 23,123 (2015).
