= Kulobi people =

Ethnic group in Tajikistan

The Kulobi Tajiks are a regional group of Tajiks in the southwest area of Tajikistan.

The Kulobis are ethnic Tajiks and speak Tajik. The current government in Tajikistan is perceived to be dominated by Kulobi Tajiks.

== History ==
The term Kulobi comes from the Kulob Oblast that existed during the Soviet period and was merged with Qurghonteppa Oblast in 1992 to create Khatlon Province.

During the Civil War in Tajikistan, the Kulyabi Tajiks fought on the side of the government against opposition. Emomalii Rahmon, from Dangara in Kulob oblast, became president of Tajikistan in November 1992, when Kulobi militiamen took control of the capital Dushanbe from opposition forces.
