= Qubodiyon =

Qubodiyon Кабодиён/Қубодиён
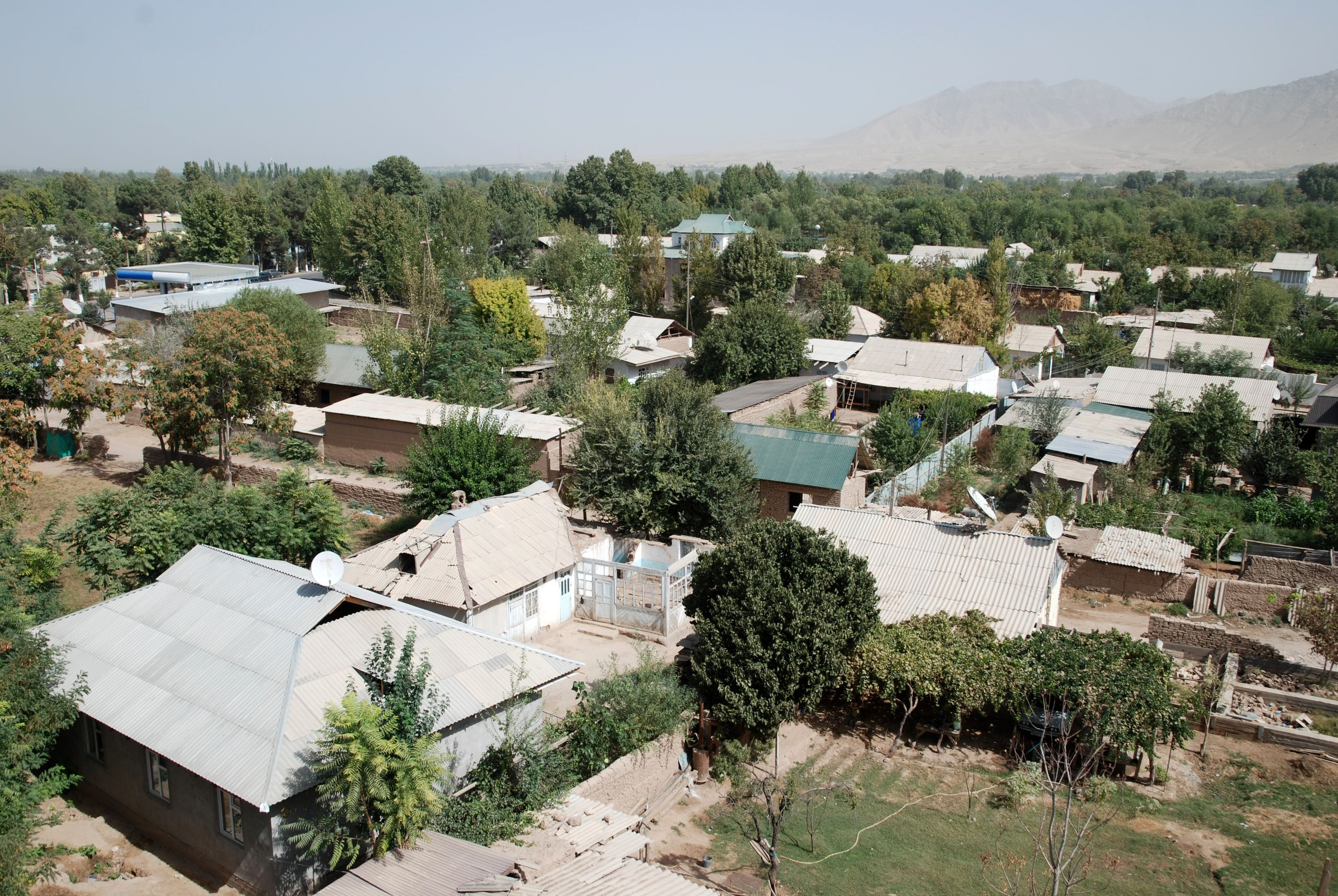

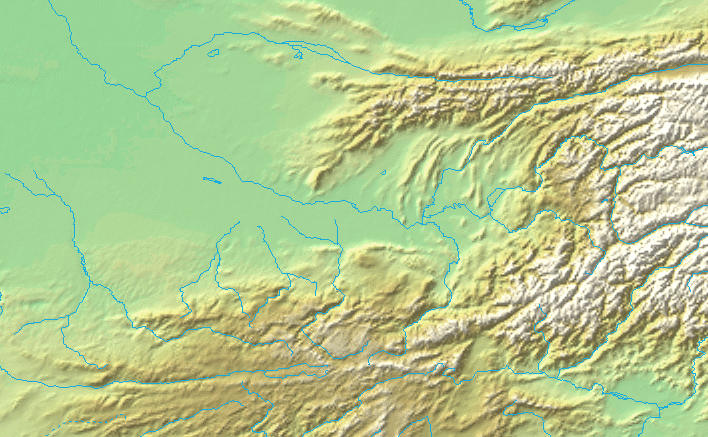
- Location in Tajikistan Qubodiyon (Tokharistan)
- Coordinates: 37°24′27″N 68°11′06″E
- Country: Tajikistan
- Region: Khatlon
- District: Qubodiyon District

Qubodiyon, also Qubadiyan, ancient Kobadiyan (Russian: Кабодиён; Tajik: Қубодиён, Qobādiyān) is a town in the Khatlon Region of Tajikistan. It is the capital of Qubodiyon District. The population of the town is 12,200 (January 2020 estimate).

Qubodiyon was possibly founded by the Sasanian king Kavad I (r. 488–496, 498/9–531) during his exile in the Hephthalite Empire, where the town possibly served as his source of revenue. In the early medieval period, it was capital of the district of Kubadhiyan.

Nasir Khusraw, a Persian poet, philosopher, Isma'ili scholar, traveler and one of the greatest writers in Persian literature was born in the village in 1004 CE.

The Oxus Treasure was found near Kobadiyan.

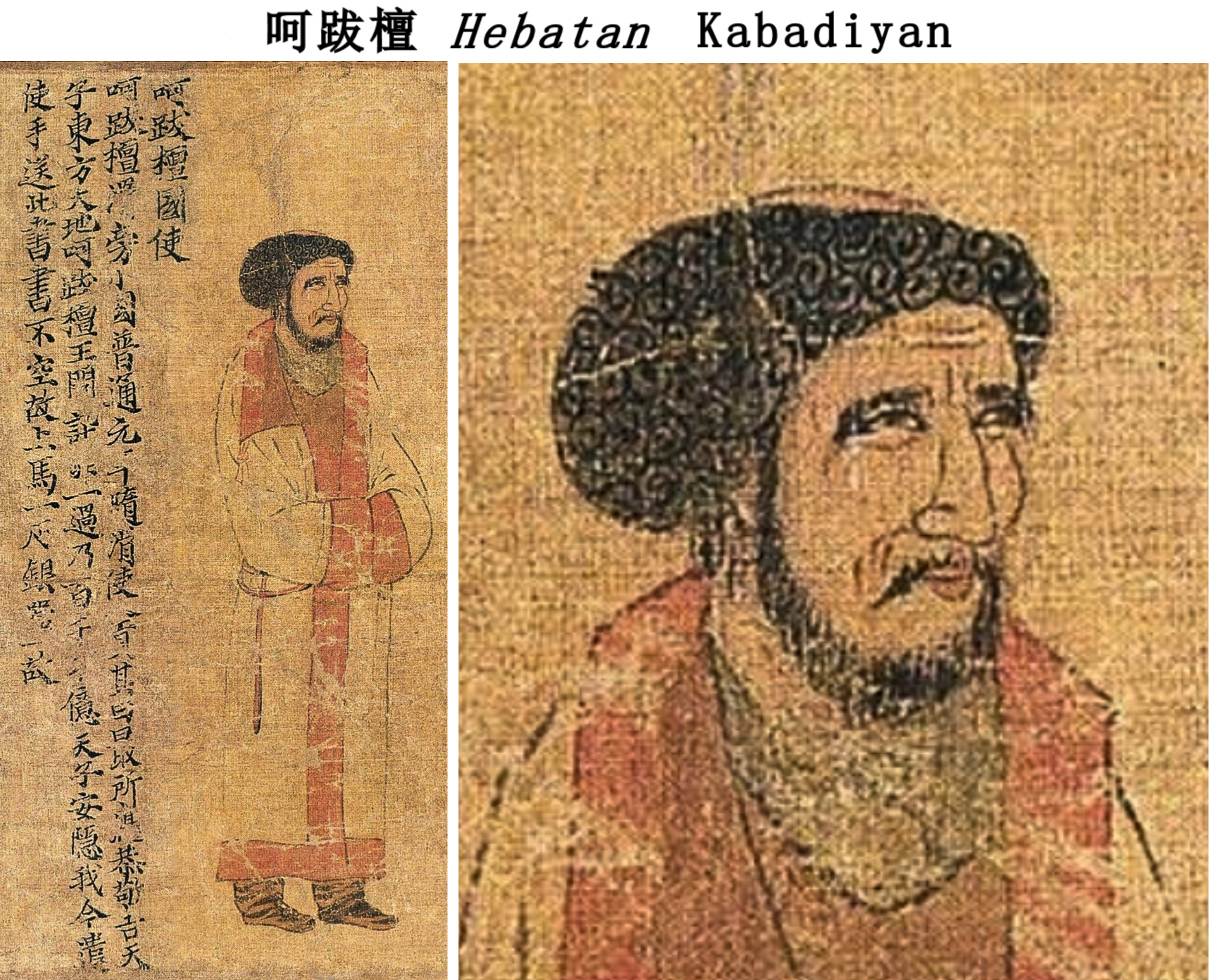
Kabadiyan ambassador to the Chinese court of Emperor Yuan of Liang in his capital Jingzhou in 516–520 CE, with explanatory text. Portraits of Periodical Offering of Liang, 11th century Song copy. The ambassador accompanied the Hephthalites to China.

== Sources ==
- Rezakhani, Khodadad (2017). ReOrienting the Sasanians: East Iran in Late Antiquity. Edinburgh University Press. pp. 1–256. ISBN 9781474400305.
