= Oriyon, Khatlon =

Oriyon
- Jamoat
- Location within Tajikistan
- Coordinates: 37°51′N 68°45′E
- Country: Tajikistan
- Region: Khatlon Region
- District: Kushoniyon District

Population (2015)
  - Total: 10,392
- Time zone: UTC+5 (TJT)
- Official languages: Russian (Interethnic); Tajik (State) (Note: Constitution of Tajikistan)

Oriyon (Russian and Tajik: Ориён, formerly: Avangard) is a jamoat in Tajikistan. It is located in Kushoniyon District in Khatlon Region. The jamoat has a total population of 10,392 (2015).
