= Navbahor =

Navbahor may refer to:

== Tajikistan ==
- Navbahor, Khatlon, a town in Bokhtar District, Khatlon Region
- Navbahor, Sughd, in Mastchoh District, Sughd Region

== Uzbekistan ==
- Navbahor District in Navoiy Region
- Navbahor, Fergana Region, a town in Furqat District, Fergana Region
- Navbahor, Namangan, a town in Namangan District, Namangan Region
- Navbahor, Pop, a town in Pop District, Namangan Region
- PFC Navbahor Namangan, an association football club in Namangan
