= Mehnatobod, Kushoniyon District =

Mehnatobod
- Village and Jamoat
- Location within Tajikistan
- Coordinates: 37°46′N 68°50′E
- Country: Tajikistan
- Region: Khatlon Region
- District: Kushoniyon District

Population (2015)
  - Total: 34,201
- Time zone: UTC+5 (TJT)

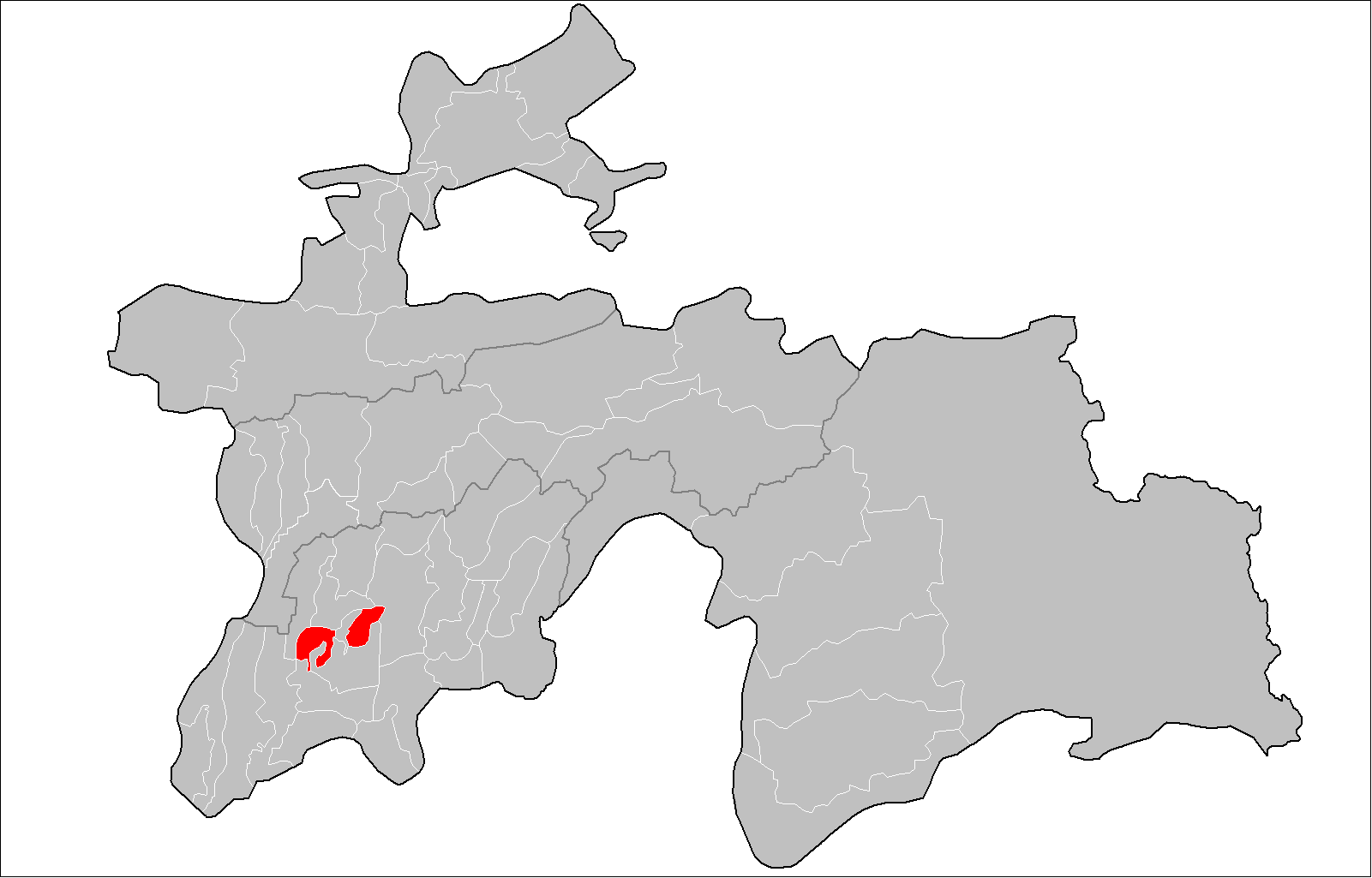
Location of Bokhtar District in Tajikistan

Mehnatobod (Tajik: Меҳнатобод, Persian: محنت‌آباد) is a village and jamoat in Tajikistan. It is located in Kushoniyon District in Khatlon Region. The jamoat has a total population of 34,201 (2015).
