= 20-Solagii Istiqloliyati Tojikiston =

Istiqlol Tajik: Ҷамоати Истиқлол
- Jamoat
- Location within Tajikistan Location within Asia
- Coordinates: 37°28′N 69°22′E
- Country: Tajikistan
- Region: Khatlon Region
- District: Farkhor District

Population (2015)
  - Total: 14,736
- Time zone: UTC+5 (TJT)
- Official languages: Russian (Interethnic); Tajik (State)

20-Solagii Istiqloliyati Tojikiston (Russian: 20-летия Независимости Республики Таджикистан; Tajik: Ҷамоати 20-солагии Истиқлолияти Тоҷикистон, literal translation: "20 years independence of Tajikistan", formerly: Komsomolobod) is a jamoat in Tajikistan. It is located in Farkhor District in Khatlon Region. The jamoat has a total population of 14,736 (2015).
