= Bustonqala =

- Town and Jamoat
- Location within Tajikistan
- Coordinates: 37°50′34″N 68°49′40″E
- Country: Tajikistan
- Region: Khatlon Region
- District: Kushoniyon District

Population (2020)
  - Total: 4,900
- Time zone: UTC+5 (TJT)

Bustonqala (Tajik: Бӯстонқалъа, Persian: بستان‌قلعه) is a town and jamoat in Tajikistan. It is located in Kushoniyon District in Khatlon Region. The population of the town is 4,900 (January 2020 estimate).
