= Ghayrat =

Khuroson Tajik: Хуросон
- Jamoat
- Location within Tajikistan
- Coordinates: 37°35′N 69°22′E
- Country: Tajikistan
- Region: Khatlon
- District: Farkhor District

Population (2015)
  - Total: 16,143
- Time zone: UTC+5 (TJT)
- Official languages: Russian (Interethnic); Tajik (State)

Khuroson (Tajik: Хуросон) is a jamoat in Tajikistan. It is located in Farkhor District in Khatlon Region. The jamoat has a total population of 16,143 (2015).
