= Galaba =

Galaba Russian: Галаба Tajik: Ғалаба
- Jamoat
- Location within Tajikistan
- Coordinates: 37°27′N 69°21′E
- Country: Tajikistan
- Region: Khatlon
- District: Farkhor District

Population (2015)
  - Total: 9,278
- Time zone: UTC+5 (TJT)
- Official languages: Russian (Interethnic); Tajik (State)

Galaba (Tajik: Ғалаба Ghalaba, Persian: غلبه) is a jamoat in Tajikistan. It is located in Farkhor District in Khatlon Region. The jamoat has a total population of 9,278 (2015).
