= Gulshan, Tajikistan =

Gulshan Russian and Tajik: Гулшан
- Village and Jamoat
- Location within Tajikistan
- Coordinates: 37°35′N 69°26′E
- Country: Tajikistan
- Region: Khatlon
- District: Farkhor District

Population (2015)
  - Total: 12,418
- Time zone: UTC+5 (TJT)
- Official languages: Russian (Interethnic); Tajik (State)

Gulshan (Tajik: Гулшан, Persian: گلشن) is a village and jamoat in Tajikistan. It is located in Farkhor District in Khatlon Region. The jamoat has a total population of 12,418 (2015).
