= Somoniyon, Kushoniyon District =

Somoniyon Сомониён
- Town and Jamoat
- Location in Tajikistan
- Coordinates: 37°46′03″N 68°48′07″E
- Country: Tajikistan
- Region: Khatlon Region
- District: Kushoniyon District

Population (2020)
  - Total: 8,500
- Time zone: UTC+5 (TJT)

Somoniyon (Tajik: Сомониён) is a town and jamoat in the Khatlon Region of Tajikistan. It is the capital of Kushoniyon District. The population of the town is 8,500 (January 2020 estimate).

== History ==
The decree of the Central Executive Committee of the USSR of March 7, 1936 approved the decree of the Central Executive Committee of the Tajik SSR of January 19, 1936 on the formation of a new Oktyabrsky district with the center in the village of Chichka in the Tajik SSR (by the same decree the village was renamed into the village of Oktyabrsk).

On November 26, 1959, the kishlak ceased to be a regional center in connection with the abolition of the Oktyabrsky district and the entry of the Oktyabrsky kishlak Soviet into the administrative subordination of the Kurgan-Tyubinsk city Soviet of workers' deputies.

The status of an urban-type settlement was granted in 1967. Since 1977, it was part of the regional center of the Kurgan-Tyube region, the city of Kurgan-Tyube. On October 17, 1980, the town of Oktyabrsk was merged with the Kurgan-Tyubinsky district under the new name of the Communist district and was designated its administrative center (instead of the regional center of the city of Kurgan-Tyube, which was removed from the district).

The communist region in 1988-1990 was part of the Khatlon region of the Tajik SSR, in 1990-1992 it was again Kurgan-Tyubinskaya. Since March 12, 1992, the town of Oktyabrsk has been the center of the Bokhtar region (renamed from the Communist) within the Khatlon region of Tajikistan.

In 1998, the village of Oktyabrsk was renamed into the village of Ismoili Somoni [3]. Since January 20, 2018, Ismoili Somoni village is the center of the Kushoniyon district (renamed from Bokhtar). In August 2024, it was renamed to Somoniyon.

== Population ==
1970	1979	1989	2013
4513	4588	6179	7600
