= Zulaykho =

Zulaykho Зулайхо
- Born: Zulaykho Mahmadshoeva; 9 September 1993 (age 32); Farkhor District, Tajikistan
- Genres: Pop
- Occupation: Singer
- Years active: 2010–present

Zulaykho Mahmadshoeva (Tajik: Зулайхо Маҳмадшоева; born 9 September 1993), also known mononymously as Zulaykho, is a Tajikistani pop singer.

== Biography ==
Zulaykho Mahmadshoeva was born on 9 September 1993, in the Farkhor District. Having two brothers and one sister, she was the eldest child in the family and grew up away from her parents under the upbringing of her grandmother and grandfather. Zulaykho graduated from school No. 1 of Farkhor District. She studied at the Department of International Relations of Tajik National University. Zulaykho was a fan of Manija Dawlat since she was young and dreamed of becoming a singer. She is known among fans as a student of Dawlat.

Zulaykho performed for the first time in 2010 with the song "Vatan" on the stage of the Ayni Opera and Ballet Theatre. In 2013, she presented her first album entitled "Mekhandam" to her fans and held her first concert program with the performance of 20 songs on Youth Day in Dushanbe in 2015.

== Personal life ==
Zulaykho is divorced from her husband and is the mother of two sons, Mukhannad and Yuzorsif.

== Discography ==
- Mexandam (2013)
- Navdanihol (2016)
- Nameʙaxşam (2020)
