= Norak District =

Coordinates: 38°17′54″N 69°22′31″E

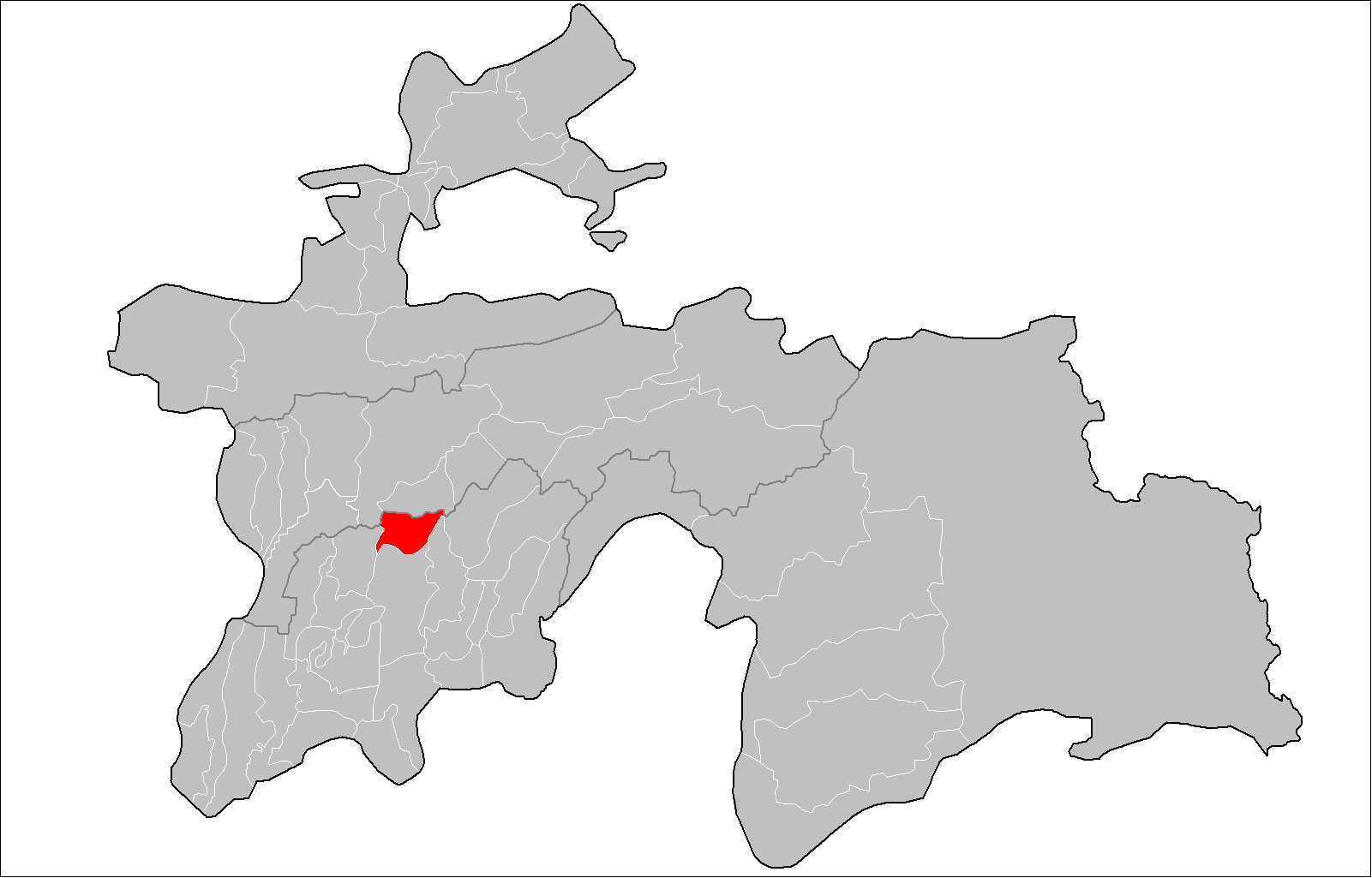
Location in Tajikistan

Norak District or Nohiya-i Norak (Tajik: Ноҳияи Норак) is a former district in Khatlon Region, Tajikistan. Its capital was Norak. Around 2018, it was merged into the city of Norak.

== Administrative divisions ==
The district was divided administratively into jamoats. They are as follows (and population).

Jamoats of Norak District
Jamoat	Population
Dukoni	
Pulisangin	
