= Kushoniyon District =

Kushoniyon District Russian: Район Кушониён Tajik: Ноҳияи Кӯшониён
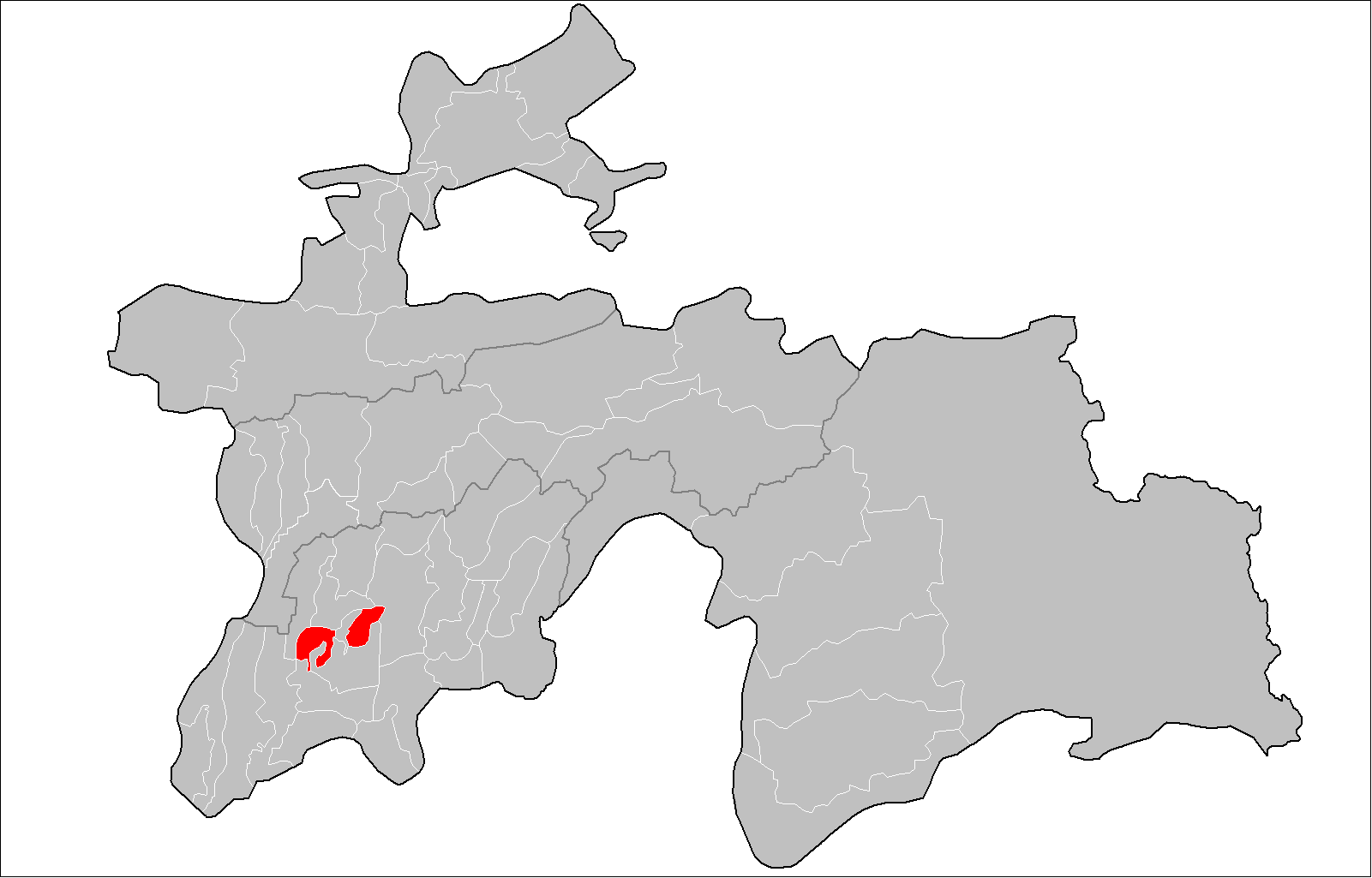
- Coordinates: 37°46′3″N 68°48′6″E
- Country: Tajikistan
- Region: Khatlon Region
- Capital: Ismoili Somoni
- Established: 7 Jan 1944

Area
  - Total: 600 km^{2} (230 sq mi)

Population (2020)
  - Total: 245,900
  - Density: 410/km^{2} (1,100/sq mi)
- Time zone: UTC+5
- +992 3245: 735140
- Official languages: Russian (Interethnic); Tajik (State)
- Website: kushoniyon.tj

Kushoniyon District (Russian: Район Кушониён/Кушониёнский район; Tajik: Ноҳияи Кӯшониён, before 2018: Bokhtar District) is a district in Khatlon Region, Tajikistan, surrounding the regional capital Qurghonteppa (Bokhtar). Its administrative capital is the town of Ismoili Somoni (pop. 8,500). The population of Kushoniyon District is 245,900 (January 2020 estimate).

== Administrative divisions ==
The district has an area of about 600 km^{2} (200 sq mi) and is divided administratively into three towns and five jamoats. They are as follows:

Jamoat	Population (Jan. 2015)
Bokhtariyon (town)	6,700
Bustonqala	4,300
Ismoili Somoni	7,800
Mehnatobod	34,201
Navbahor	18,281
Oriyon	10,392
Sarvati Istiqlol	33,071
Zargar	49,235

== History ==
On 7 January 1944 the district was created under the named Oktyabr District (ноҳияи Октябр) was created in the Qurghonteppa Oblast. On 6 January 1965 the District was renamed to Kommunisti District (ноҳияи Коммунистӣ). Then in 1990 the district was renamed to Bokhtar District. And finally in 2018 - to Kushoniyon District.

== Geology ==
Bokhtar area forms part of Amu Darya basin. This basin has been estimated to contain vast reserves of oil, natural gas and condensate.
