= Norak =

Norak Russian: Нурек Tajik: Норак
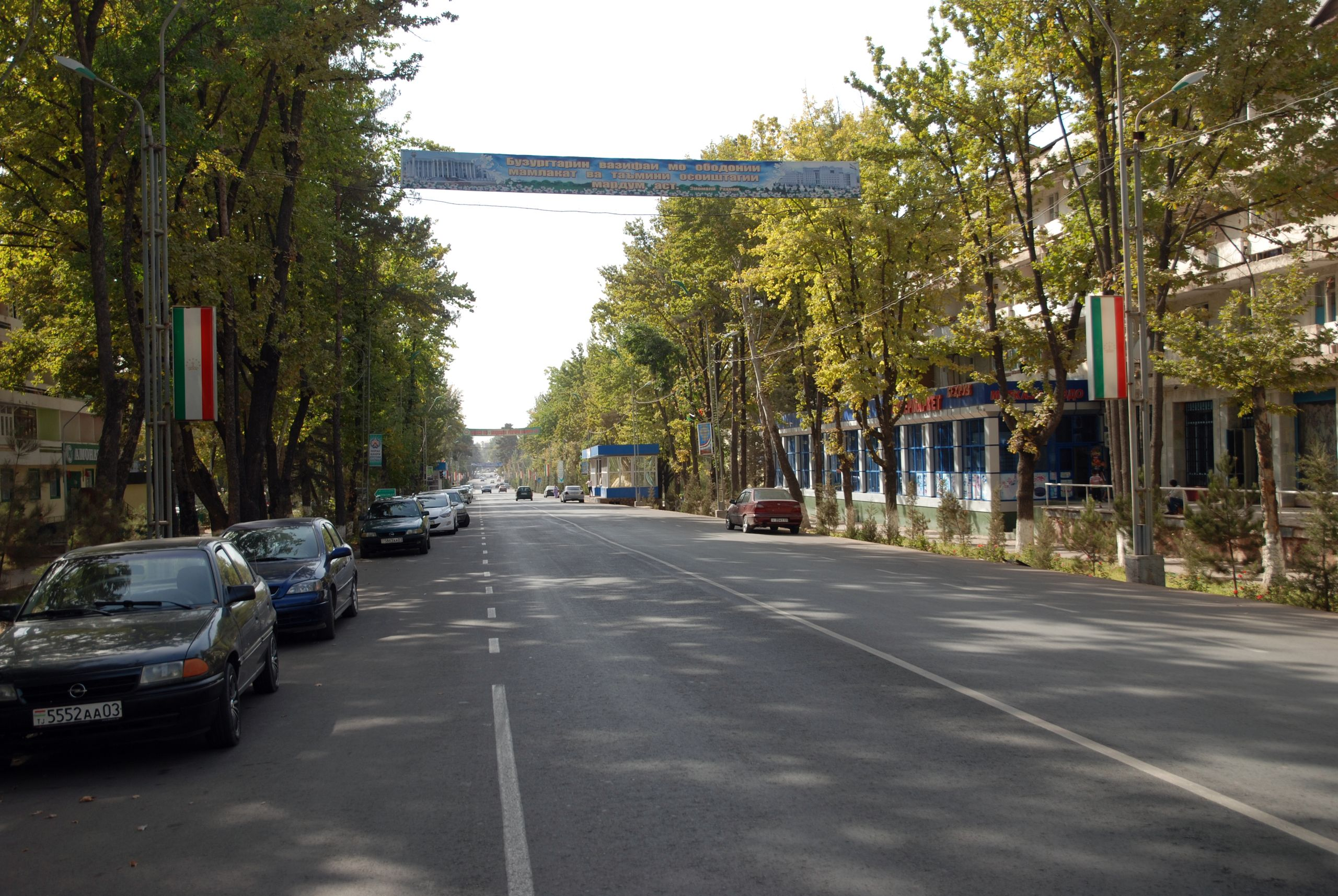

- Location in Tajikistan
- Coordinates: 38°23′N 69°19′E
- Country: Tajikistan
- Region: Khatlon Region

Population (2020)
  - City: 61,500
  - Urban: 31,400
- Official languages: Russian (Interethnic); Tajik (State)

Norak (Russian: Нурек, Tajik: Норак Norak) is a city in the Khatlon Region of Tajikistan. It is situated on the river Vakhsh, 885 m above sea level, and is 70 km southeast of Dushanbe, the capital. Its population is estimated at 31,400 for the city proper and 61,500 for the city with the outlying communities (2020).

The city was founded in 1960 alongside the construction of Nurek Dam, which was completed in 1980.

The city also has a military area housing personnel working at the nearby optical satellite tracking facility, the Okno ("Window") complex.

== Subdivisions ==
Before 2018, Norak was the seat of Norak District, which covered the rural part of the present city of Norak. The city of Norak covers Norak proper and two jamoats. These are as follows:

Jamoat	Population (Jan. 2015)
Dukoni	15,681
Pulisangin	11,960

== Notable people ==
- Rustam Abdulov (born 1973), former footballer
