= Khatlon Valley =

Khatlon Valley (Tajik: Водии Хатлон) is a valley in Tajikistan.

== See also ==
- Khatlon Region
