= Rustam Abdulov =

Russian footballer

Personal information
- Full name: Rustam Rezoyevich Abdulov
- Date of birth: 29 March 1973 (age 53)
- Place of birth: Norak, Tajik SSR
- Height: 1.79 m (5 ft 10 1/2 in)
- Position: Midfielder

Senior career*
Years	Team	Apps	(Gls)
1992	FC Lokomotiv Nizhny Novgorod	0	(0)
1992	FC Torpedo Pavlovo	27	(0)
1993	FC Lokomotiv Nizhny Novgorod	1	(0)
1993–1994	FC Torpedo Pavlovo	41	(0)
1995–1997	FC Khimik Dzerzhinsk	59	(0)
1998	FC Energiya Gorodets		
2000	FC Spartak-MIZ Vorsma		
- * Club domestic league appearances and goals

Rustam Rezoyevich Abdulov (Russian: Рустам Резоевич Абдулов; born 29 March 1973) is a former Russian football player.

== Club career ==
He made his Russian Premier League debut for FC Lokomotiv Nizhny Novgorod on 7 March 1993 in a game against FC Zhemchuzhina Sochi.
