= Vakhsh District =

Vakhsh District (Tajik: Ноҳияи Вахш)
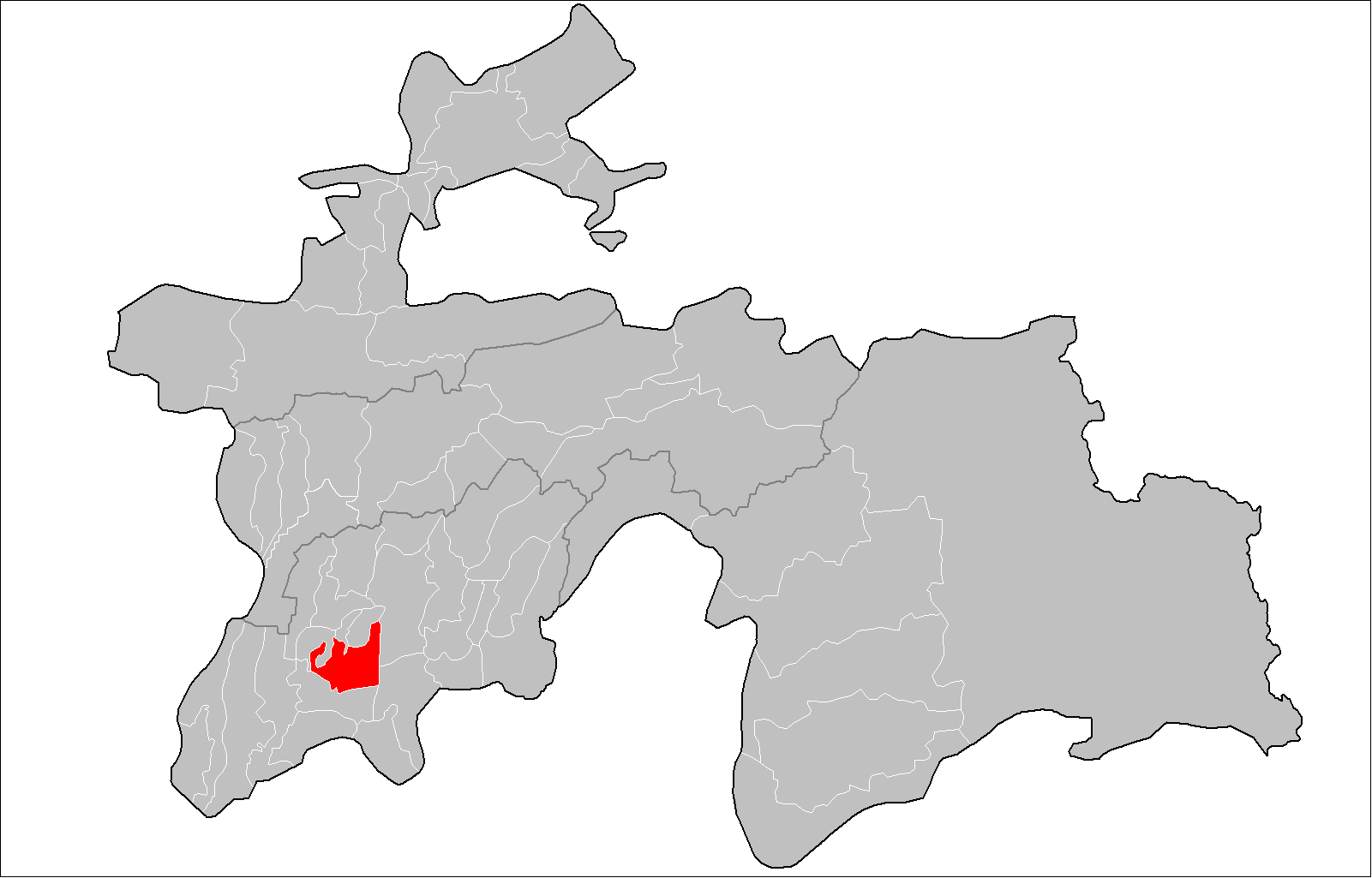
- Location of the district in Tajikistan
- Coordinates: 37°40′N 68°52′E
- Country: Tajikistan
- Region: Khatlon Region
- Capital: Vakhsh

Area
  - Total: 1,000 km^{2} (390 sq mi)

Population (2020)
  - Total: 199,300
  - Density: 200/km^{2} (520/sq mi)
- Time zone: UTC+5
- Website: vakhsh.tj

Vakhsh District (Tajik: Ноҳияи Вахш Nohiya-i Vakhsh) is a district in Khatlon Region, Tajikistan. Its capital is Vakhsh. It is located in the southern part of Khatlon and of the country. The population of the district is 199,300 (January 2020 estimate).

== Administrative divisions ==
The district has an area of about 1,000 km^{2} (400 sq mi) and is divided administratively into two towns and five jamoats. They are as follows:

| Jamoat | Population (Jan. 2015) |
|---|---|
| Kirov (town) | 5,500 |
| Vakhsh (town) | 14,100 |
| Mash'al | |
| Rudaki | 22,085 |
| 20-Solagii Istiqloliyati Tojikiston | 32,260 |
| Tojikobod | 32,716 |
| Vahdat | 14,727 |
