= Qubodiyon District =

Qubodiyon District Russian: Кубодиёнский район Tajik: Ноҳияи Ҷалолиддин Балхӣ
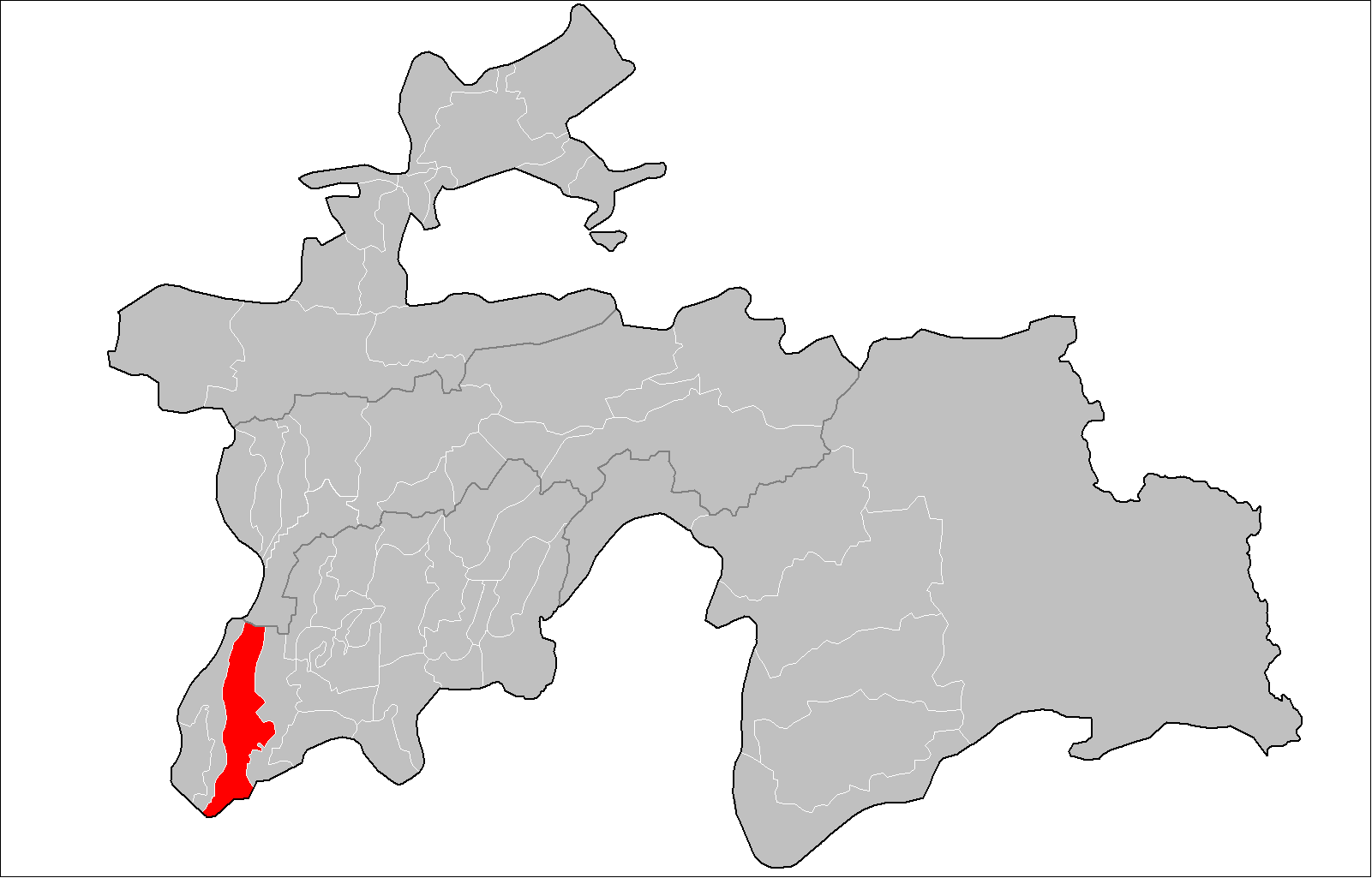
- Location of the district in Tajikistan
- Coordinates: 37°26′N 68°13′E
- Country: Tajikistan
- Region: Khatlon Region
- Capital: Qubodiyon

Area
  - Total: 1,800 km^{2} (690 sq mi)

Population (2020)
  - Total: 188,100
  - Density: 100/km^{2} (270/sq mi)
- Time zone: UTC+5
- Official languages: Russian (Interethnic); Tajik (State) (Note: Constitution of Tajikistan)
- Website: qubodiyon.tj

Qubodiyon District or Nohiya-i Qubodiyon (Russian: Кубодиёнский район; Tajik: Ноҳияи Қубодиён) is a district in Khatlon Region, Tajikistan. Its capital is the town Qubodiyon. The population of the district is 188,100 (January 2020 estimate).

== Administrative divisions ==
The district has an area of about 1,800 km^{2} (700 sq mi) and is divided administratively into one town and seven jamoats. They are as follows:

Jamoat	Population (Jan. 2015)
Qubodiyon (town)	12,200 (2020)
Nosir Khusrav	35,248
Navobod	11,200
Utaqara Nazarov	
Niyozov	18,682
20-Solagii Istiqlol	
Takhti Sangin	36,769
Zarkamar	11,787
