= Khoja Mashkhad Mausoleum =

Pre-Mongol madrasah in Khatlon, Tajikistan

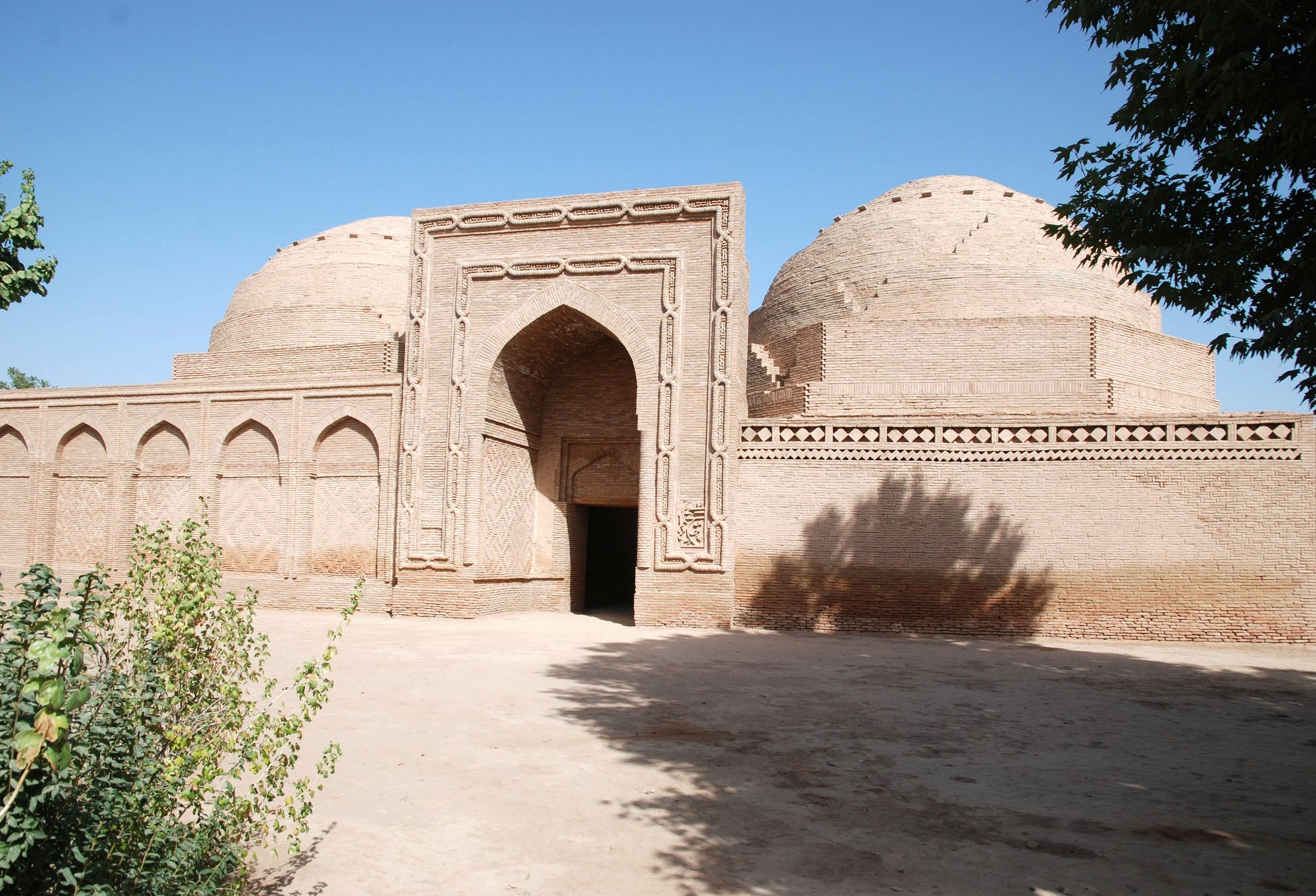

The Mausoleum of Khoja Mashkhad is located 6 km south of Shaartuz in the Khatlon province of Tajikistan.

== Site description ==
The mausoleum is a rare example of a pre-Mongol madrasah from the 11th and 12th centuries. Two large, domed structures are connected at the middle by a small arch, constructed of mud-brick. Due to the building materials used, the structure is prone to decay and is in need of conservation.

== World Heritage Status ==
This site was added to the UNESCO World Heritage Tentative List on November 9, 1999, in the Cultural category.
