= Kubadhiyan =

Kubadhiyan or Kuwadhiyan was a medieval district in Transoxiana, with Qubodiyon as its capital.

== Geography and history ==
The province lay to the west of the upper Oxus River and encompassed the valley of the Kubadhiyan River (modern Kafirnihan), which sprang from the Buttaman Mountains and joined the Oxus at Awwaj or Awzaj (modern Ayvaj). The province adjoined Chaghaniyan in the west and Wakhsh and Khuttal (to which it was usually attached) in the east. The toponym is first attested, in the opinion of the German orientalist Josef Markwart, in the locality Kio-ho-yen-na mentioned by the 7th-century Chinese Buddhist pilgrim Xuanzang.

The town of Kubadhiyan (modern Qubodiyon) was the chief city of the province, and lay on the namesake river. In the account of Ibn Hawqal the town is also called Fazz. It is described as smaller than Tirmidh, but the source of famed fruits and madder dye, which was exported as far as India. Other important towns were the river-crossing of Awwaj/Awzaj, and the populous fortress towns of Washjird and Shuman further up the Kubadhiyan River. Due to the threat of raids by the tribes of the Buttaman Mountains, the province was dotted with smaller fortifications as well. The north of the province around Shuman was also notable for its production of saffron, which was also exported.

== Sources ==
- Bosworth, C. E. (1986). "Ḳubād̲h̲iyān". In Bosworth, C. E.; van Donzel, E.; Lewis, B. & Pellat, Ch. (eds.). The Encyclopaedia of Islam, Second Edition. Volume V: Khe–Mahi. Leiden: E. J. Brill. pp. 286–287. doi:10.1163/1573-3912_islam_SIM_4461. ISBN 978-90-04-07819-2.
- Le Strange, Guy (1905). The Lands of the Eastern Caliphate: Mesopotamia, Persia, and Central Asia, from the Moslem Conquest to the Time of Timur. New York: Barnes & Noble, Inc. OCLC 1044046.
