= Navbahor, Khatlon =

Navbahor
- Jamoat
- Location within Tajikistan
- Coordinates: 37°44′N 68°46′E
- Country: Tajikistan
- Region: Khatlon
- District: Kushoniyon District

Population (2015)
  - Total: 18,281
- Time zone: UTC+5 (TJT)

Navbahor (Tajik: Навбаҳор, Persian: نوبهار) is a jamoat in Tajikistan. It is located in Kushoniyon District in Khatlon Region. The jamoat has a total population of 18,281 (2015).
