= Farkhor District =

Farkhor District Ноҳияи Фархор (Tajik) Пархарский район (Russian)
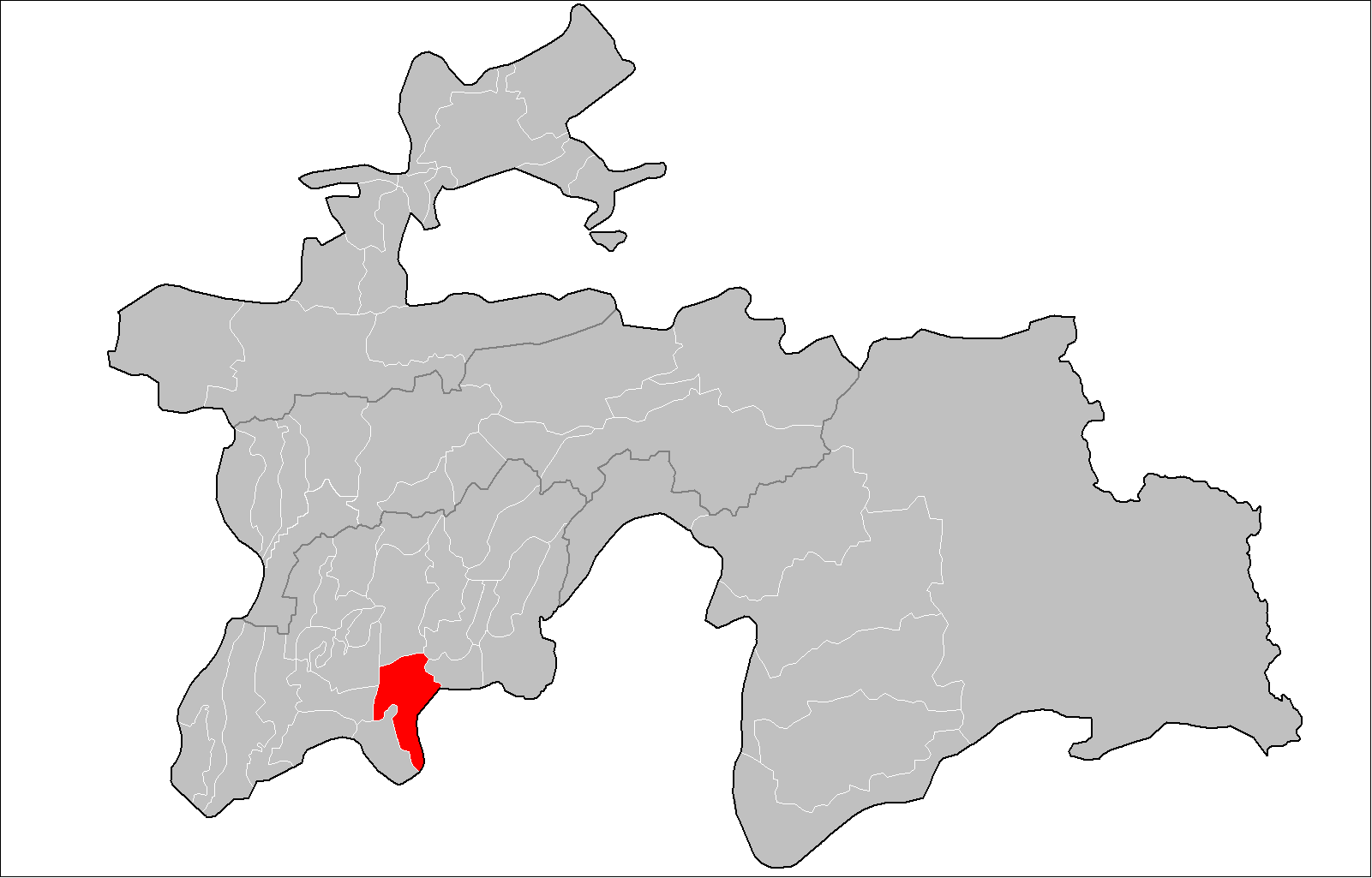
- Location of the district in Tajikistan
- Coordinates: 37°30′N 69°24′E
- Country: Tajikistan
- Region: Khatlon Region
- Established: 23 Nov 1930
- Capital: Farkhor

Area
  - City: 1,138.1 km^{2} (439.4 sq mi)

Population (2020)
  - City: 170,800
  - Density: 150.1/km^{2} (388.7/sq mi)
  - Urban: 25,300
- Time zone: UTC+5
- +992 3316: 735140
- Official languages: Russian (Interethnic); Tajik (State)
- Website: farkhor.tj

Farkhor District (Tajik: Ноҳияи Фархор; Russian: Пархарский район, romanized: Parkharsky rayon) (Note: Also spelled as Russian: Фархорский район, romanized: Farkhorsky rayon.) is a district in Khatlon Region, Tajikistan. Its capital is the town Farkhor. The population of the district is 170,800 (January 2020 estimate).

== Administrative divisions ==
The district has an area of about 1,200 km^{2} (500 sq mi) and is divided administratively into one town and nine jamoats. They are as follows:

Jamoat	Population (Jan. 2015)
Farkhor (town)	22,900
Darqad	14,503
Dehqonariq	12,327
Farkhor	12,057
Galaba	9,278
Ghayrat	16,143
Gulshan	12,418
20-Solagii Istiqloliyati Tojikiston	14,736
Vatan	23,123
Zafar	13,885

== Notable people ==
- Zulaykho (born 1993), pop singer
