= Hulbuk =

Hulbuk Tajik: Ҳулбук
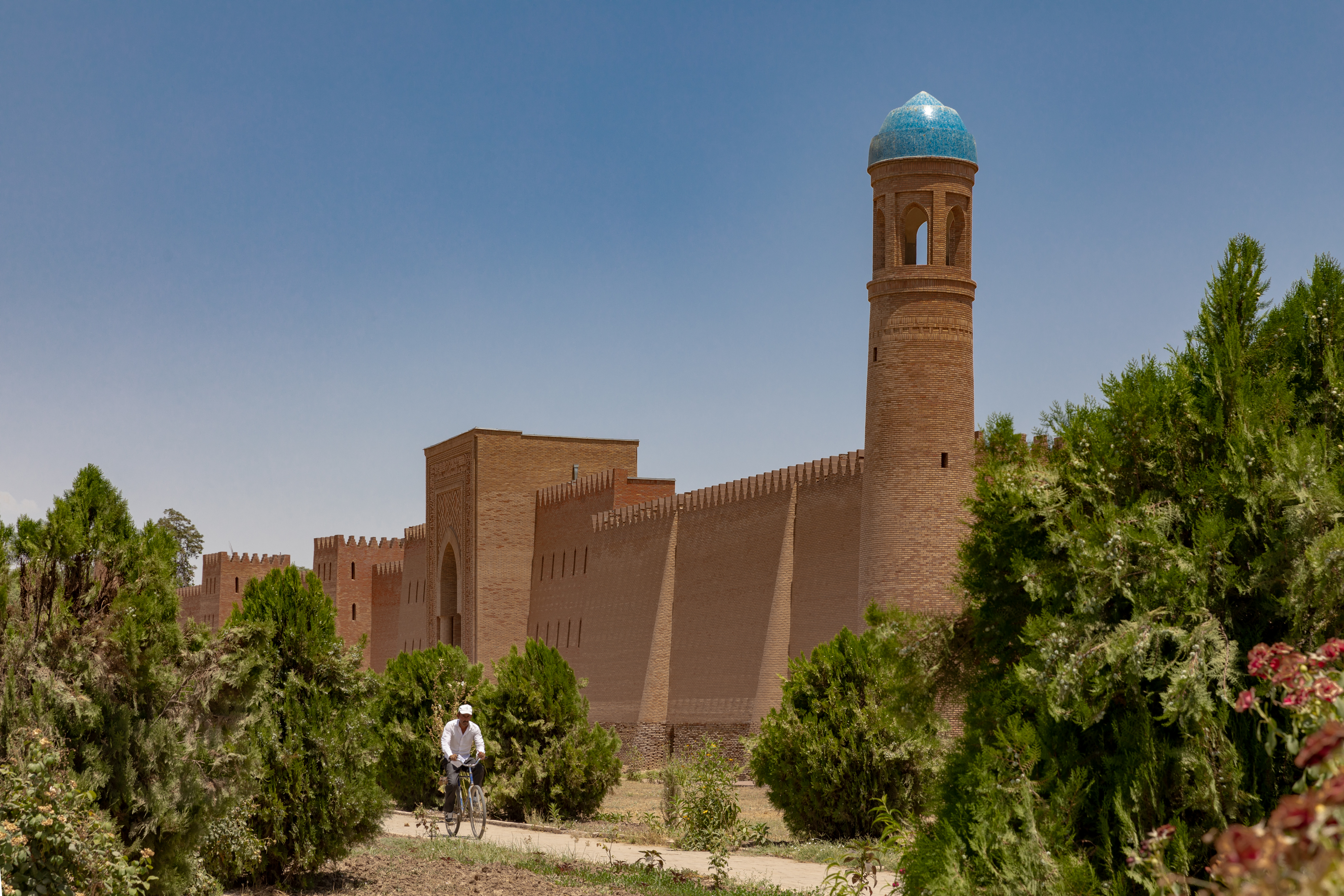
- Walls of the Palace of Khulbuk

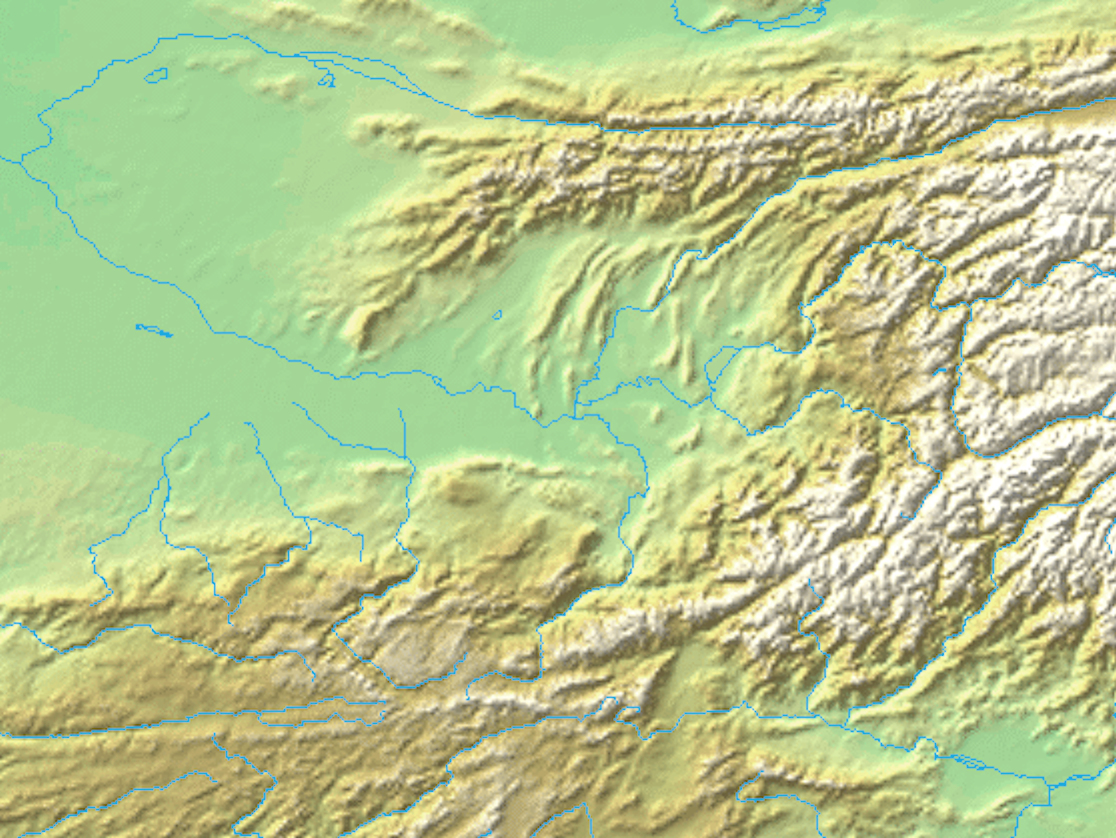
- Location in Tajikistan Hulbuk (Bactria) Hulbuk (West and Central Asia)
- Coordinates: 37°48′18″N 69°38′47″E
- Country: Tajikistan
- Region: Khatlon Region
- District: Vose' District
- Elevation: 475 m (1,558 ft)

Population (2020)
  - Total: 24,500
- Time zone: UTC+5

Hulbuk (Tajik: Ҳулбук), formerly Vose' (Восеъ), Poytug (Пойтуғ) is the capital of the Vose' District of the Khatlon Region, Tajikistan. It had an estimated population of 24,500 as of 2020. It is located in the southern portion of Tajikistan 26 kilometres (16 mi) southwest of Kulob and 174 km (108 mi) south of Dushanbe, capital of Tajikistan.

== Geography ==
=== Climate ===
Hulbuk has a cold semi-arid climate (Köppen climate classification BSk). The average annual temperature is 16.4 °C (61.5 °F). The warmest month is July with an average temperature of 29 °C (84.2 °F) and the coolest month is January with an average temperature of 2.8 °C (37 °F). The average annual precipitation is 414.3 millimetres (16.31 in) and has an average of 71.3 days with precipitation. The wettest month is March with an average of 86.8 mm (3.42 in) of precipitation and the driest month is August with an average of 0 mm of precipitation.

Climate data for Vose'
Month	Jan	Feb	Mar	Apr	May	Jun	Jul	Aug	Sep	Oct	Nov	Dec	Year
Daily mean °C (°F)	2.8 (37.0)	5.5 (41.9)	11.1 (52.0)	17.5 (63.5)	22.0 (71.6)	26.9 (80.4)	29.0 (84.2)	27.2 (81.0)	22.3 (72.1)	16.8 (62.2)	10.6 (51.1)	5.5 (41.9)	16.4 (61.5)
Average precipitation mm (inches)	49.3 (1.94)	59.1 (2.33)	86.8 (3.42)	72.6 (2.86)	49.6 (1.95)	4.0 (0.16)	2.6 (0.10)	0.4 (0.02)	1.0 (0.04)	18.9 (0.74)	30.0 (1.18)	40.0 (1.57)	414.3 (16.31)
Average precipitation days (≥ 0.1 mm)	7.9	9.2	12.3	11.5	9.1	2.3	0.9	0.0	0.5	4.0	5.6	8.0	71.3
Average relative humidity (%)	75.8	72.3	68.5	64.1	54.5	38.2	33.5	34.6	37.9	48.8	62.4	72.2	55.2
Source: "The Climate of Vose". Weatherbase.

== History ==
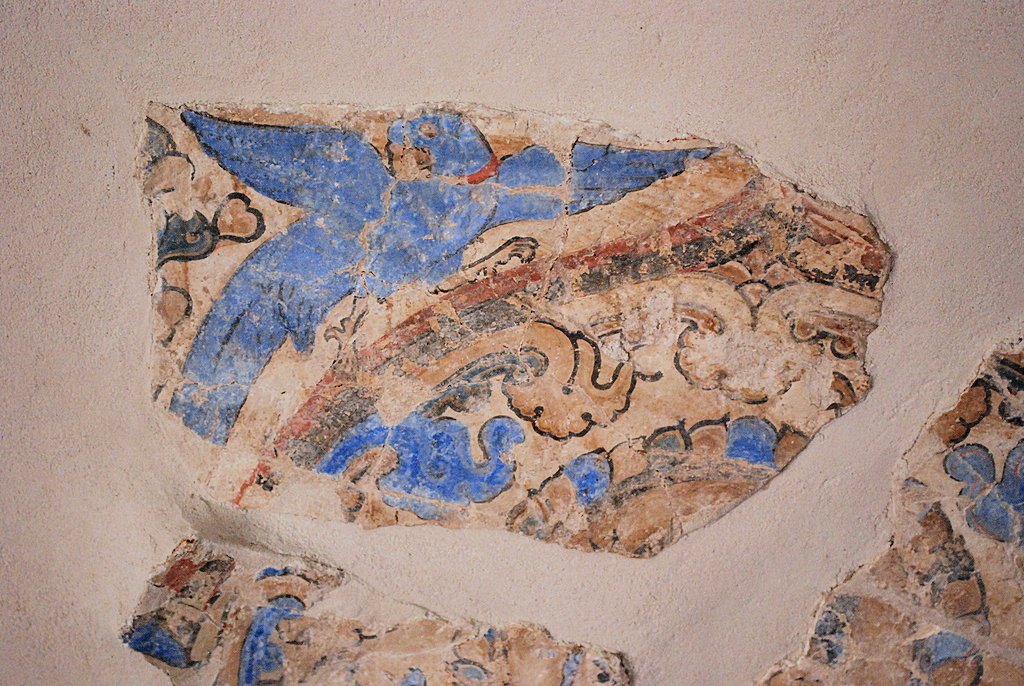
Wall Painting, Khulbuk, 10th-11th century CE. National Museum of Antiquities of Tajikistan.

It is suspected that Hulbuk, a medieval town, housed the Banijurids, a Turco-Iranian dynasty from the eastern region of Central Asia. Hulbuk allegedly facilitated a rich and powerful court suspected by the palatial and monumental architecture found in the region. In 1953, the initial excavation took place for more than 40 years and uncovered a citadel. Unfortunately, no topographical map has been drawn of the site. The citadel is thought to be built as a stronghold, lending support that it was used by the dynasty.
