= Dangara Massif Important Bird Area =

Coordinates: 37°58′21″N 69°28′56″E

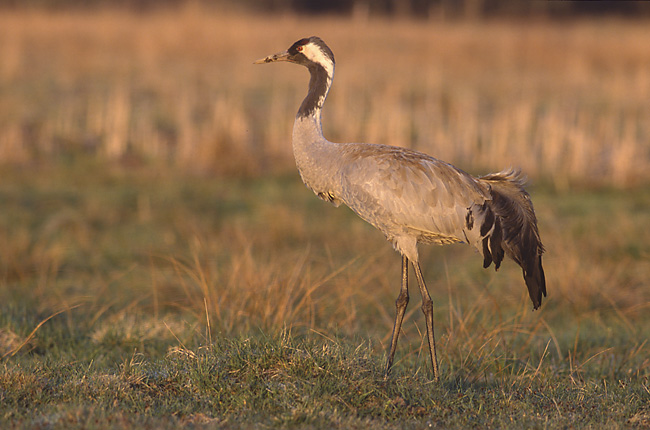
Up to 2000 common cranes winter in the IBA.

The Dangara Massif Important Bird Area (Chinese: 丹加拉地块重点鸟区) is a 700 km^{2} upland massif in eastern Khatlon Province in southwest Tajikistan.

== Description ==
The Important Bird Area (IBA) lies between the Vakhsh and Panj Rivers at an altitude of 550–570 m above sea level, near the city of Kulob. A road and railway running through the middle of the massif connects Kulob with Tajikistan's capital, Dushanbe. The IBA is centred on Dangara Mountain and is characterised by rolling, treeless hills, covered with grassland and agricultural land. The IBA's natural flora is typical of a semi-arid climate and is mainly herbaceous; it begins to grow from mid February, flowering in early spring and beginning to die back from mid May.

== Birds ==
Previously, the massif was used mainly for autumn and winter pasture. With agricultural development – cereal and legume cropping and the establishment of reservoirs – the area has attracted larger numbers of waterbirds and granivorous species.

The site was identified as an IBA by BirdLife International because it supports significant numbers of the populations of various bird species, either as resident breeders or on migration. These include see-see partridges, ruddy shelducks, saker falcons, common cranes, Upcher's warblers, plain leaf-warblers, eastern rock-nuthatches, white-throated robins, Finsch's wheatears, variable wheatears, red-tailed wheatears, chestnut-breasted buntings and grey-necked buntings.
