= Vose' District =

Vose' District (Tajik: Ноҳияи Восеъ)
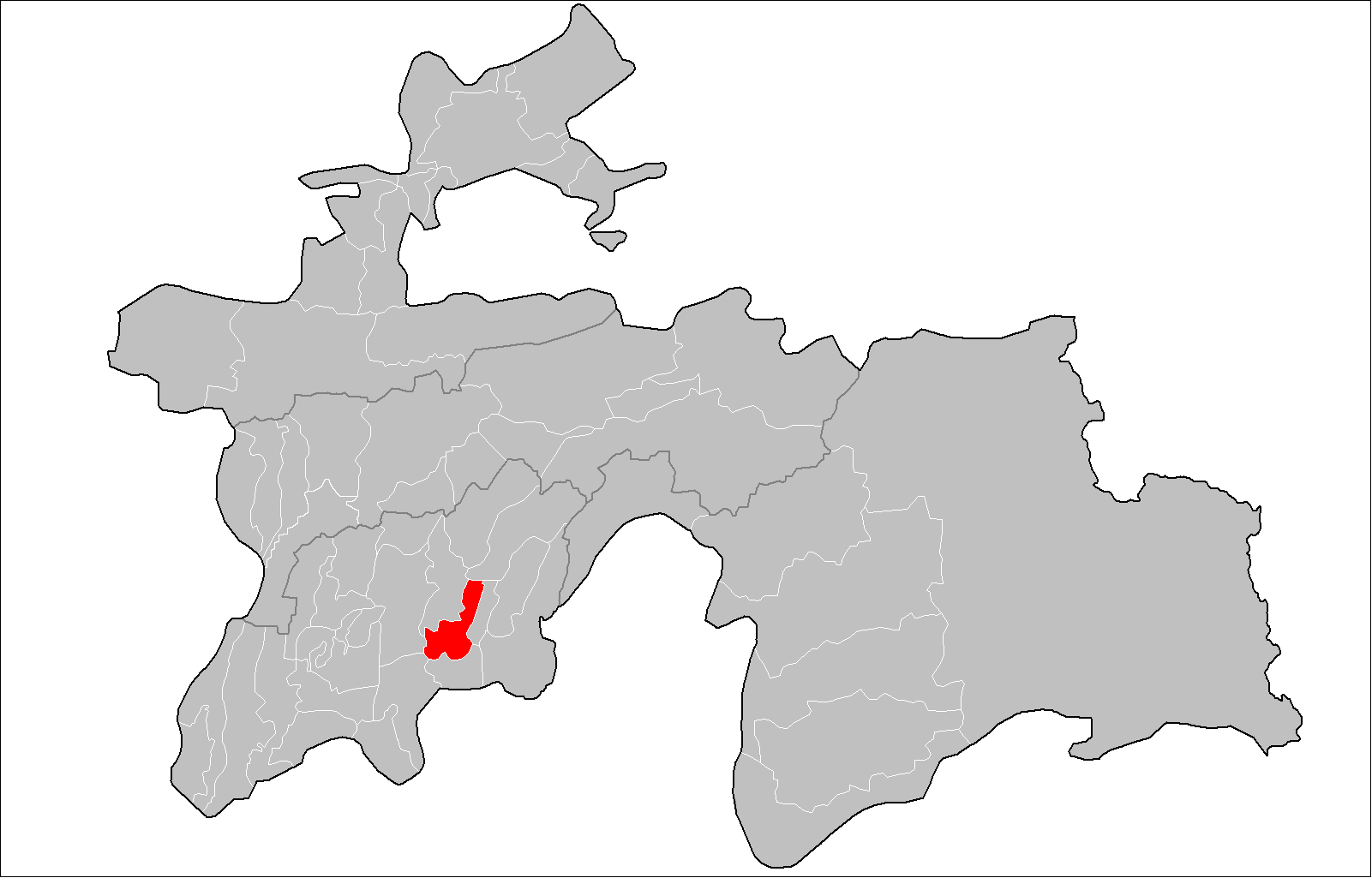
- Location of the district in Tajikistan
- Coordinates: 37°50′N 69°35′E
- Country: Tajikistan
- Region: Khatlon Region
- Capital: Hulbuk

Area
  - Total: 800 km^{2} (310 sq mi)

Population (2020)
  - Total: 216,500
  - Density: 270/km^{2} (700/sq mi)
- Time zone: UTC+5
- Website: vose.tj

Vose' District (Tajik: Ноҳияи Восеъ, romanized: Nohiyai Vose'; Russian: Восейский район) is a district in Khatlon Region, Tajikistan. Its capital is the town Hulbuk (former name: Vose'). The population of the district is 216,500 (January 2020 estimate).

== Administrative divisions ==
The district has an area of about 800 km^{2} (300 sq mi) and is divided administratively into one town and seven jamoats. They are as follows:

Jamoat	Population (Jan. 2015)
Hulbuk (town)	22,700
Abdi Avazov	19,310
Guliston	24,739
Mirali Mahmadaliev	32 800
Khudoyor Rajabov	24,772
Abuabdullohi Rudaki	10,295
Tugarak	29,188
Mirzoali Vayzov	30,495
