= Kulab Region =

Kulob Oblast вилояти Кӯлоб
- Administrative District
- Established: 1939, during the Soviet period
- Time zone: Turkmenistan Time (UTC+5)

Kulob Oblast (Tajik: вилояти Кӯлоб; also Kulyab Oblast from Russian spelling) was an administrative subdivision in Tajikistan during the Soviet period (Tajik SSR). It was created in 1939 but was abolished in 1955 along with Gharm Oblast and its territory was ceded to the Districts of Republican Subordination. In 1973 it was reconstituted and this time lasted until 1988 when it and its neighbor Qurghonteppa Oblast merged to form a new region, Khatlon Oblast. In 1990, Khalton Oblast was abolished and the 2 Oblasts were reconstituted. However, this only lasted 2 more years, because in 1992, it was once again merged with the Qurghonteppa Oblast to recreate Khatlon Region.

The city of Kulob (also called Kulyab) was the capital of the oblast. The inhabitants of Kulob Oblast were referred to as Kulobis. Kulob Oblast was a center for fighting in the first year of the civil war in Tajikistan. Many important figures in the government of Tajikistan originated from Kulob Oblast, including current president Emomali Rahmon.

== Timeline ==
- 1939: Created during Soviet period
- 1955: Abolished along with Gharm Oblast, territory ceded to Districts of Republican Subordination
- 1973: Reconstituted
- 1988: It and neighbor Qurghonteppa Oblast merged to form Khalton Oblast
- 1990: Khalton Oblast abolished, Kulob reconstituted
- 1992: Merged with Qurghonteppa Oblast again
