= Qizilsu =

Location
- Country: Tajikistan

Physical characteristics
- Mouth: Panj
  - coordinates: 37.3723°N 69.3815°E
- Length: 230 km (140 mi)
- Basin size: 8,630 km^{2} (3,330 sq mi)

Basin features
- Progression: Panj→ Amu Darya→ Aral Sea

The Qizilsu (Tajik: Қизилсу) or Kyzylsu (Russian: Кызылсу) is a river that rises on the southern slopes of the Vakhsh Range in the north-east of Tajikistan's Khatlon Region and runs south-west until joining the Panj on the border with Afghanistan. The river is 230 kilometres (140 mi) long and has a basin area of 8,630 square kilometres (3,330 mi^{2}). It merges with the Yakhsu (Akhshu) as a major left tributary south of the town of Kulob. It irrigates the cotton-growing Qizilsu Valley between Kulob and Panj in the south-east of Khatlon Province. It is not the Kyzyl-Suu River that rises in Kyrgyzstan and flows through Tajikistan as Surkhob, then Vakhsh, following a course north-west of Qizilsu.
