= Vakhsh Range =

Mountain range in Tajikistan

Coordinates: 38°40′54″N 69°53′34″E

Vakhsh Range (Russian: Вахшский хребет; Tajik: қаторкӯҳи Вахш; Uzbek: Vaxsh tizmasi) is a mountain range in Tajikistan, forming the north-west border of Khatlon Province with the Region of Republican Subordination. It stretches for a length of about 80 km along the left bank in the middle course of the Vakhsh River. Maximum altitude is 3,141 meters (10,305 ft). Composed of sandstone, limestone, and clay. Semidesert and subtropical steppe. Ваш это тавилдара (Kyzylsu River) rises on its southern slopes.
