= Qurghonteppa Oblast =

Former administrative subdivision in Tajikistan

Coordinates: 37°47′43″N 68°49′21″E

Qurghonteppa Oblast (also known as Kurgan-Tyube Oblast (Russian: Курга́н-Тюби́нская область; Tajik: Вилояти Кӯрғонтеппа)) was an administrative subdivision in Tajikistan until 1992, when it was merged with Kulob Oblast to create Khatlon Province.

== History ==
Qurghonteppa district was first created in 1924 when Tajikistan was part of the Soviet Union. In 1929 the district was dissolved. In 1938 the district of Stalinobad was created and on 7 January 1944 Qurghonteppa Oblast was created. The districts included in Qurghonteppa Oblast were Voroshilovobod District, Dangara District, Dahanakiik District, Kaghanovichobod District, Kirovobod District, Kuibeshev District, Qurghonteppa District, Mikoyanobod District, Molotovobod District, Oktyabr District, Jilikul District and Shahritus District. On 24 August 1947 the oblast was abolished.

In April 1977 Qurghonteppa Oblast was reconstituted, only to be abolished and merged with Kulob Oblast in September 1988. The new combined oblast was named Khatlon. The Qurghonteppa oblast was later reconstituted in 1990 and then finally abolished once again in 1992.

The capital of Qurghonteppa Oblast was the city of Qurghonteppa (Kurgan-Tyube), which is now the capital of Khatlon Province. The inhabitants of Qurghonteppa Oblast included migrant communities from elsewhere in Tajikistan, including Gharmis and Pamiris, that settled in the Vakhsh River valley. Qurghonteppa Oblast saw a great deal of violence during the first year of the civil war in Tajikistan. Many important figures in the Islamic Renaissance Party of Tajikistan originated from Qurghonteppa Oblast, including Sayid Abdulloh Nuri.
