= Khatlon Region =

Region of Tajikistan

Khatlon Вилояти Хатлон (Tajik)
- Region
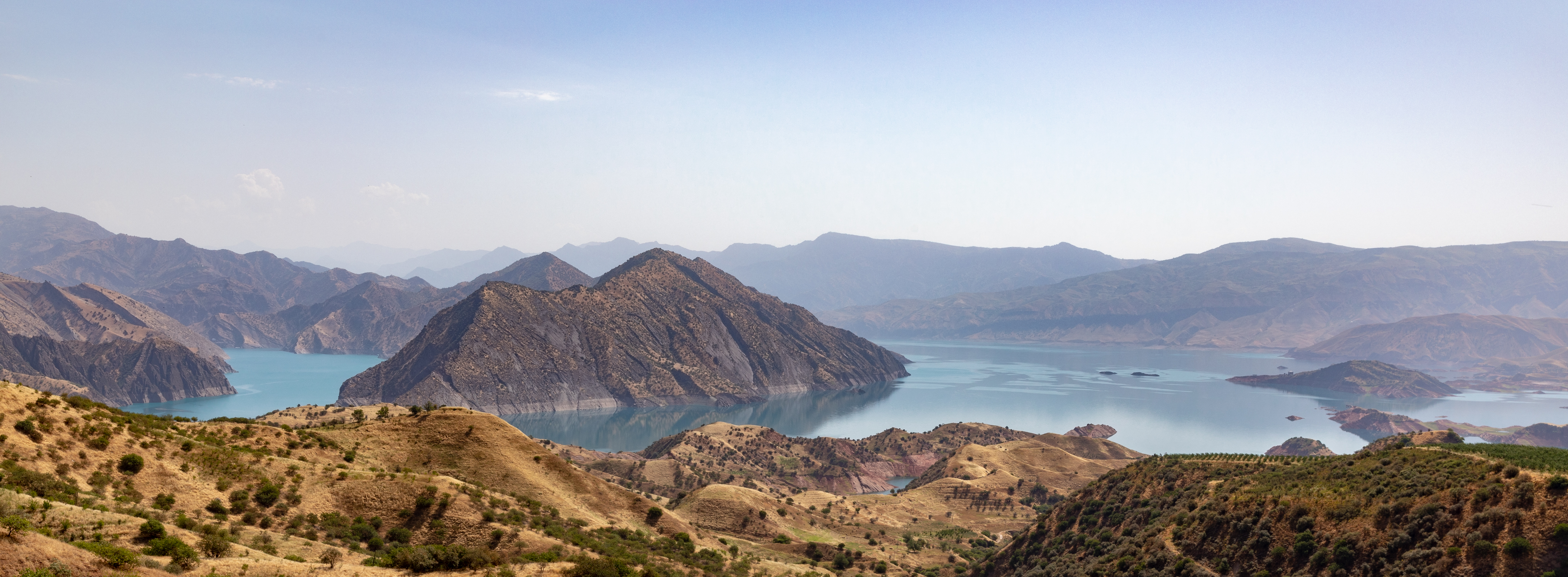
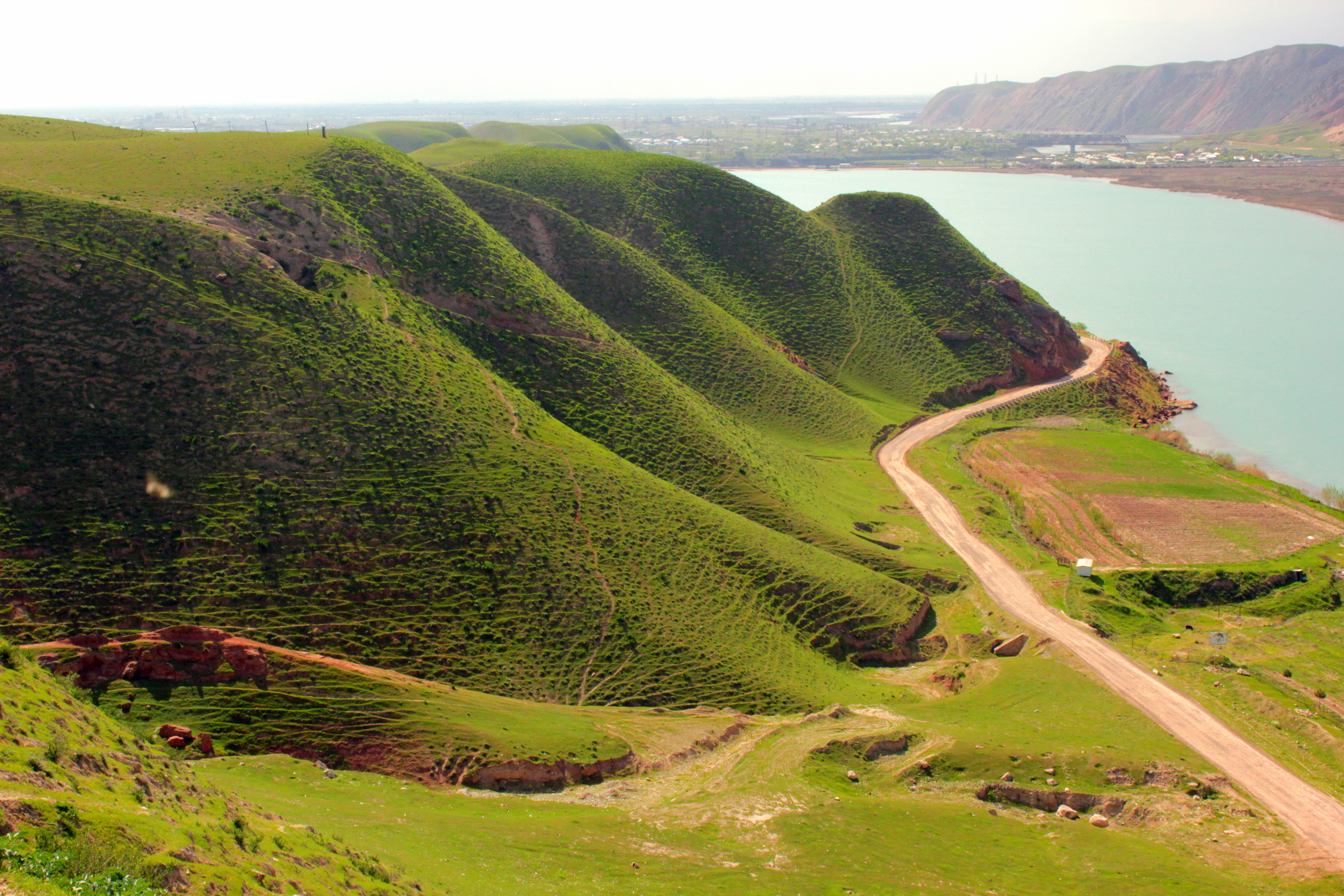
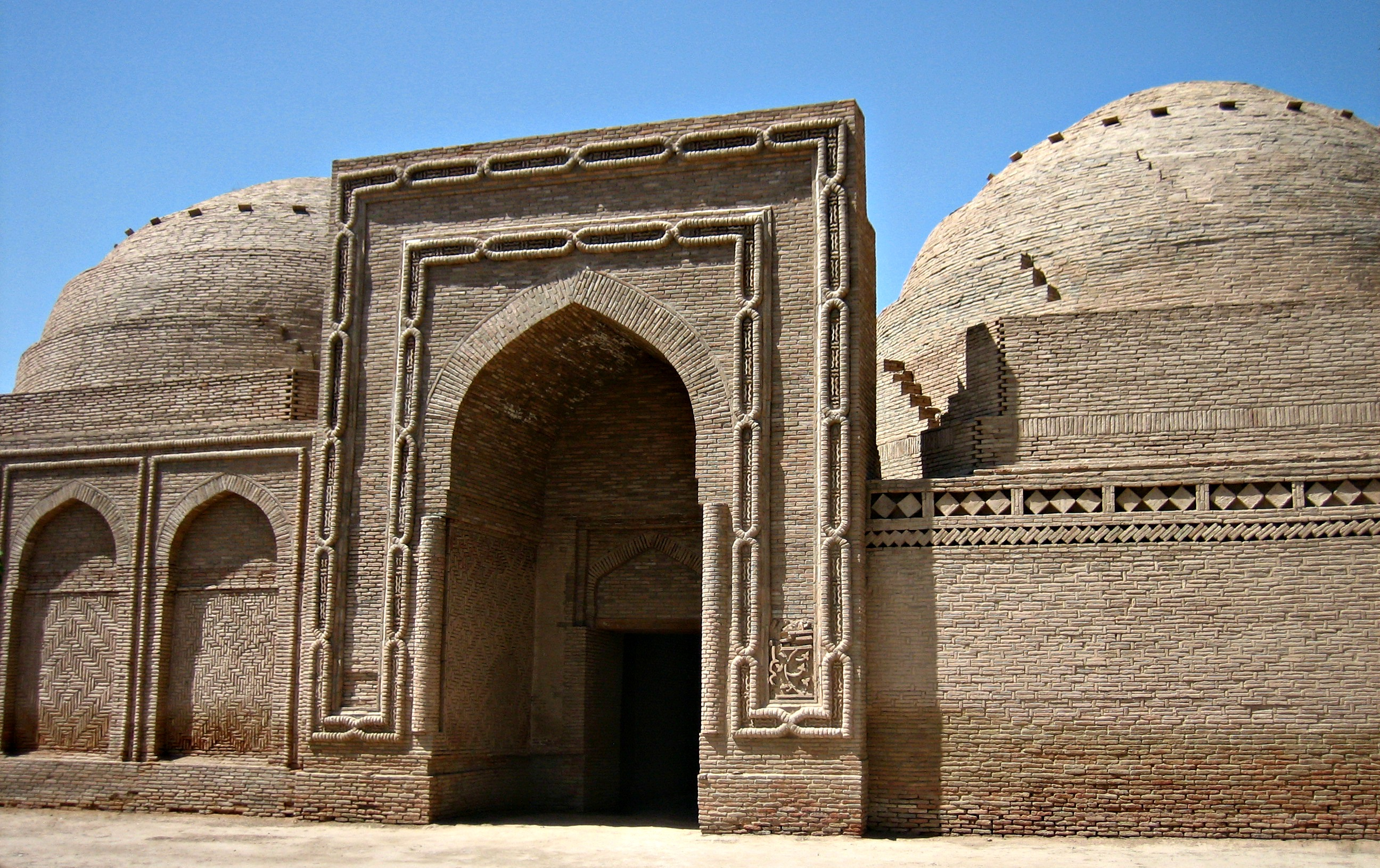
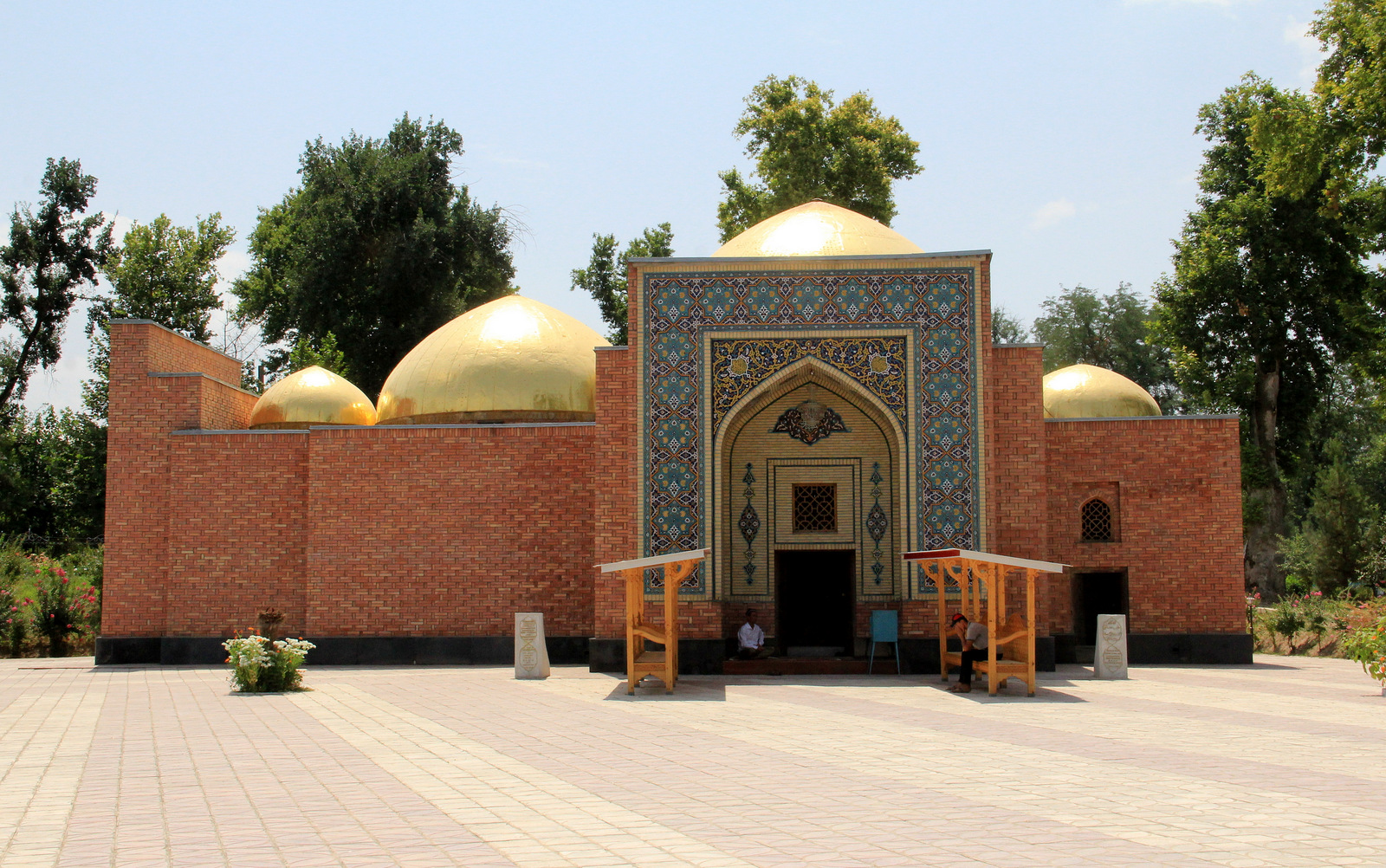
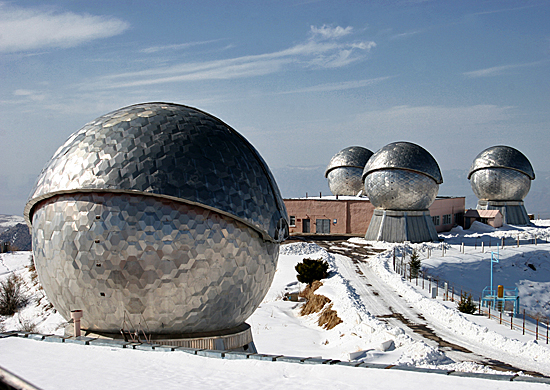
- From the top to bottom-right, Nurek Reservoir, Sarband, Khoja Mashkhad Mausoleum, Tomb of Mir Sayyid Ali Hamadani, Okno Station

- Khatlon in Tajikistan
- Coordinates: 37°50′N 69°00′E
- Country: Tajikistan
- Capital: Bokhtar

Area
  - Total: 24,700 km^{2} (9,500 sq mi)

Population (2020)
  - Total: 3,348,300
  - Density: 136/km^{2} (351/sq mi)
- ISO 3166 code: TJ-KT
- HDI (2023): 0.673 medium
- Official languages: Russian (Interethnic); Tajik (State)

Khatlon Region (Tajik: Вилояти Хатлон, romanized: Viloyati Xatlon), one of the four provinces of Tajikistan, is the most populous of the four first-level administrative regions in the country. It is situated in the southwest of the country, between the Hisor (Gissar) Range in the north and the river Panj in the south and borders on Districts under Republican Subordination in the north, on GBAO in the east, on Afghanistan (Balkh, Kunduz, Takhar and Badakhshan provinces) in the southeast and on Uzbekistan (Surxondaryo region)in the west. During Soviet times, Khatlon was divided into Kurgan-Tyube (Qurghonteppa) Oblast (Western Khatlon) – with the Kofarnihon and Vakhsh river valleys – and Kulob Oblast (Eastern Khatlon) – with the Kyzylsu and Yakhsu river valleys. The two regions were merged in November 1992 into today's Khatlon Region (or viloyat/oblast). The capital city is Bokhtar, formerly known as Qurghonteppa and Kurgan-Tyube.

Khatlon has an area of 24,700 square kilometres and consists of 21 districts and 4 district-level cities. The total population of Khatlon in 2020 was 3,348,300, up from 2,677,251 in the 2010 population census. The population in Khatlon is mainly engaged in agriculture.

== History ==
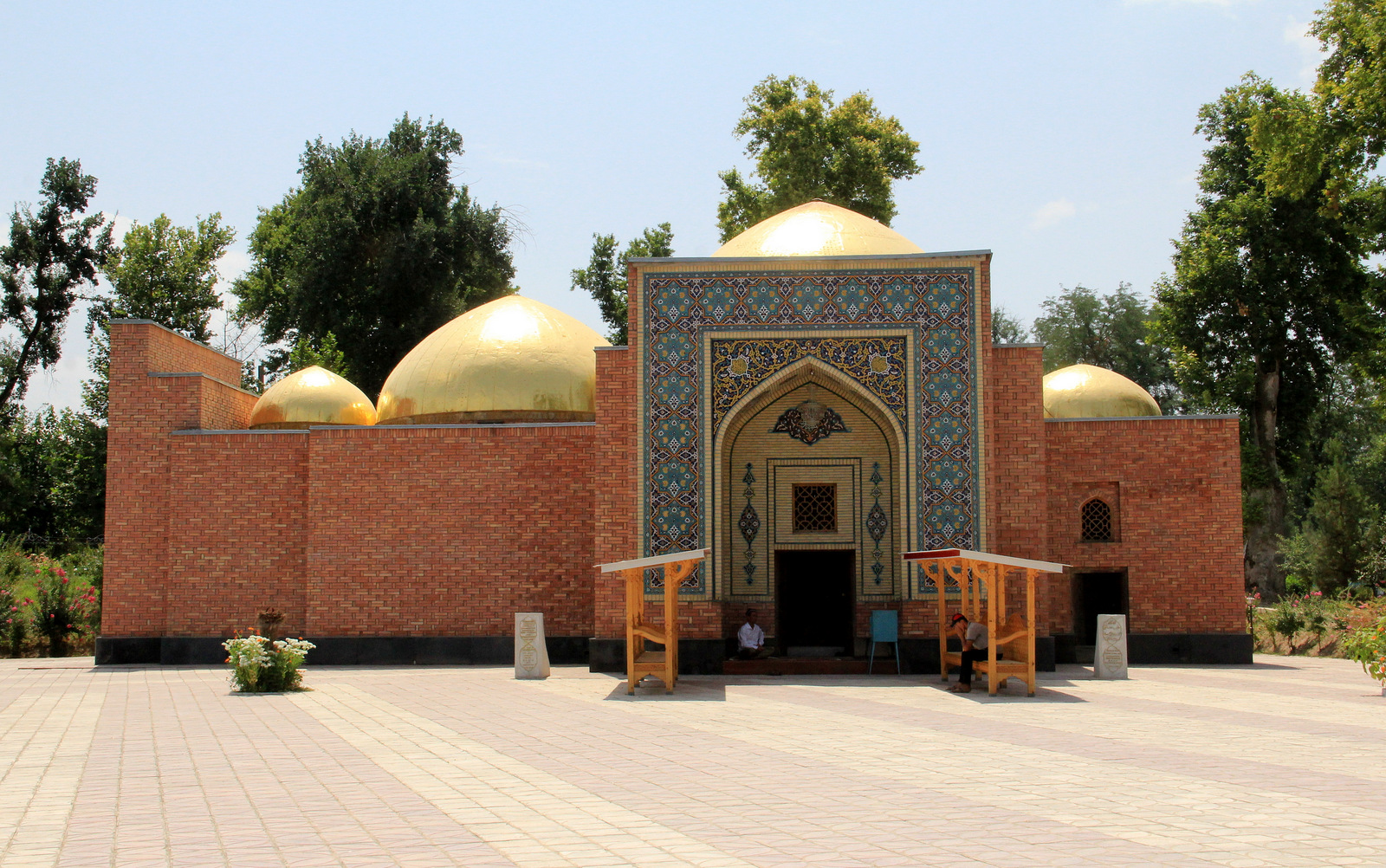
Tomb of Mir Sayyid Ali Hamadani

During the Soviet era, Khatlon became one of the two main cotton regions in Tajikistan, along with Sughd (Leninabad). Collectivisation of agriculture was implemented aggressively in the early 1930s, to expand cotton cultivation in Tajikistan as a whole, with particular emphasis on the southern part of the republic. The process included violations against peasants, substantial expansion of the irrigation network, and forcible resettlement of mountain peoples and people from Uzbekistan to the lowlands.

The results of this policy are to be seen in the ethnic composition of Salua oblast as well as in the fact that the Tajik population identifies themselves either as Gharmis (resettled from the mountains) or Kulobis. These groups never melted, and fought against each other during the Civil War in Tajikistan. Khatlon oblast suffered the heaviest damage in Tajikistan.

Since the conflicts leading to the civil war were never really resolved, tensions in the region still exist. The eastern part – Kulob – is home to the president and his clan and has thus gained a lot of political influence. During Soviet times, the region cooperated with the then ruling elite from Leninabad, and was responsible for the militia, the army and the security forces. Kulob is regarded as a very conservative region. In the capital Bokhtar and parts of Kulob, the Islamic opposition has a lot of support among the Garmis.

The Kulyab clan is based in Khatlon. In February 1996 Colonel Mahmud Khudoiberdiyev launched a rebellion, insisting that three officials from the Kulyab clan resign before he ended the rebellion. The government complied. Additionally, Prime Minister Dzhamshed Karimov and Abudzhalil Khamidov, the Chairman of the Leninabad Oblast executive committee, resigned.

== Administrative divisions ==
The Khatlon Region is subdivided into 21 districts and 4 district-level cities: Kulob, Levakant, Norak and Bokhtar. The districts are:

- Baljuvon District (Sarikhosor District)
- Danghara District
- Dusti District (Jilikul District)
- Farkhor District
- Hamadoni District (Moskovskiy District)
- Jaloliddin Balkhi District (Kolkhozobod District, Rumi District)
- Jayhun District (Qumsangir District, Molotovobod District)
- Jomi District (Kuybyshevskiy District, Dzhami District, Khojamaston District)
- Khovaling District
- Khuroson District (Ghozimalik District)
- Kushoniyon District (Bokhtar District)
- Mu'minobod District (Leningradskiy District)
- Nosiri Khusrav District (Beshkent District)
- Panj District (Saroy-Kamar District, Kirovobod District)
- Qubodiyon District
- Shahritus District
- Shamsiddin Shohin District (Shuro-obod District)
- Temurmalik District (Qizil-Mazor District, Sovetskiy District)
- Vakhsh District (Qurghonteppa District)
- Vose' District (Hulbuk District, Aral District)
- Yovon District

=== Former districts ===
- Kulob District
- Norak District
- Sarband District (Levakant District)

== Demography ==
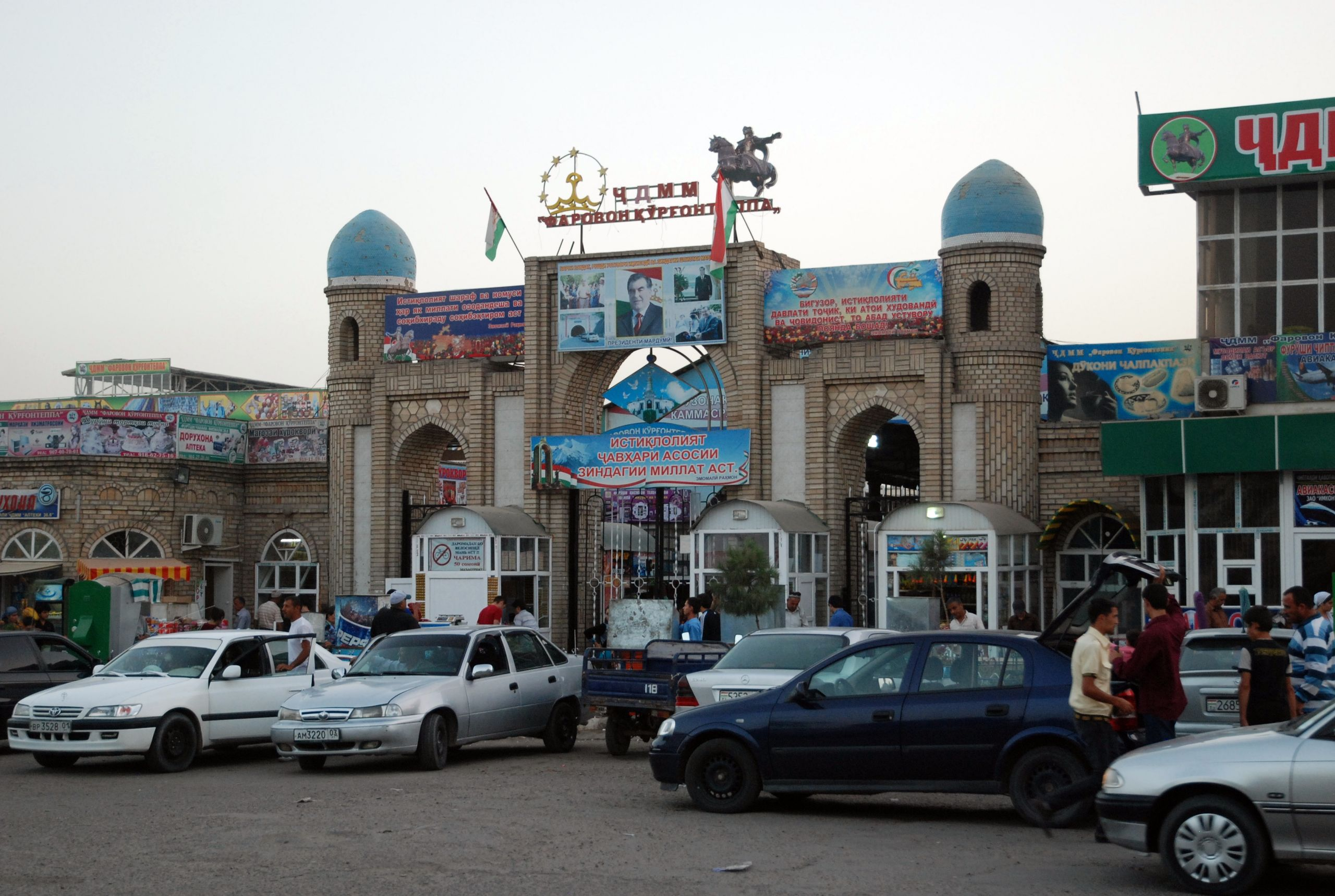
Bokhtar Bazar

In 2010, the ethnic composition of the Khatlon region was 81.8% Tajik, 12.9% Uzbek, 0.5% Turkmen and 4.6% other. The ethnic composition of Kulob region is: 85% Tajiks, 13% Uzbeks, 2% others. In Bokhtar the breakdown is 59% Tajiks, 32% Uzbeks and 3% Russians.

Historical population
Year	Pop.	±% p.a.
1979	1,220,949	—
1989	1,701,380	+3.37%
1999	2,150,136	+2.37%
2010	2,677,251	+2.01%
2020	3,348,300	+2.26%
Source: Citypopulation

== Terrorist attack ==
On 29 July 2018, four cyclists, two Americans, one Dutch national and one Swiss national, were killed by a hit and run driver while three others were injured. Officials said the terrorists rammed into the group before getting out and attacking them with knives. 4 suspects were killed by security forces and 1 suspect was arrested.

== See also ==
- Khatlon Valley
- Principality of Khuttal
- 2006 Tajikistan earthquake
- Dangara Massif Important Bird Area
