= List of power stations in Tajikistan =

This article lists all power stations in Tajikistan.

== Thermal ==
Power plant	Capacity (MW)	Year completed
Dushanbe-2	400	2014

== Hydroelectric ==
Hydroelectric station	Capacity (MW)	Year completed	River
Nurek Dam	3,015	1972	Vakhsh River
Sangtuda 1 Hydroelectric Power Plant	670	2009	Vakhsh River
Baipaza Dam	600	1985	Vakhsh River
Golovnaya Dam	240	1962	Vakhsh River
Sangtuda 2 Hydroelectric Power Plant	220	2011	Vakhsh River
Farkhad Dam	126	1948	Syr Darya
Kayrakkum Dam	126	1959	Syr Darya
