= Baipaza Dam =

Dam in Yovon, Khatlon, Tajikistan

- Location within Tajikistan
- Official name: НБО Бойғозӣ (Tajik); Байпазинская ГЭС (Russian)
- Country: Tajikistan
- Location: Yovon, Khatlon Province
- Coordinates: 38°16′4.07″N 69°7′24.28″E
- Purpose: Power, irrigation
- Status: Operational
- Opening date: 1985; 41 years ago

Dam and spillways
- Type of dam: Embankment, concrete-face rock-fill
- Impounds: Vakhsh River
- Height: 75 m (246 ft)

Reservoir
- Active capacity: 84,000,000 m^{3} (68,000 acre⋅ft)

Power Station
- Operator: Barqi Tojik
- Commission date: 1985–1986
- Type: Conventional
- Turbines: 4 x 150 MW Francis-type
- Installed capacity: 600 MW
- Annual generation: 3,500 GWh

The Baipaza Dam (Tajik: НБО Бойғозӣ, Russian: Байпазинская ГЭС) is a concrete face rock-fill dam on the Vakhsh River about 9 km (5.6 mi) southeast of Yovon in Khatlon Region, Tajikistan. It lies 30km downstream of Nurek Dam and 30km upstream of Sangtuda 1 Dam.

The Baipaza Dam contains one of five hydroelectric power station on the Vakhsh River, that together forms the "Vakhsh Hydropower Cascade". The plant with an installed capacity of 600 MW, is operated by an approximately 380 employees from JSC Barqi Tojik. The reservoir also supplies water for irrigation in the Yovon and Obikiik valleys.

== History ==
The Baipaza Dam was originally developed as part of the Yavan–Obikiik irrigation system. Construction of the dam began in November 1962 and was substantially completed by 1968. The works included a rock-fill dam, a spillway on the river’s left bank and an intake connected to an irrigation tunnel. Subsequently, construction of the hydroelectric power station took place between 1979 and 1986, according to JSC Hydroproject's design. The plant's first hydroelectric generating unit was launched on 10 January 1985, followed by the second on 26 June 1985, the third on 19 December 1985, and the last on 1 July 1986.

On 3 March 2002, an earthquake triggered a landslide approximately five kilometres downstream of the power station. The displaced material partially obstructed the Vakhsh River, raising the water level by about seven metres and threatened to flood the plant. Emergency blasting and excavation were undertaken to restore the river’s flow. In September 2002, the Asian Development Bank approved an emergency stabilisation project, with pre-earthquake levels of electricity generation and irrigation water supply restored by June 2005.

In the early 2020s, several organisations, including the Eurasian Fund for Stabilization and Development and the World Bank, explored the feasibility of rehabilitating the hydropower station. The proposed works included refurbishing ageing equipment, improving structural integrity and dam safety, and modernising monitoring and control systems.

== Design ==
The Baipaza Hydro Power Plant is equipped with four individual turbine, each with a nominal output of around 150 MW, giving the station a total nominal capacity of 600 MW. The power plant's dam is 75 m (246 ft) high, and forms a reservoir with a total storage capacity of about 220 million m^{3}, of which approximately 20 million m^{3} is usable for power generation. The reservoir also supplies irrigation water to 40,000 ha (99,000 acres) of land in the Yovon and Obikiik valleys to the west, conveyed through a 7.3-kilometre-long (4.5 mi) tunnel extending from the right back of the reservoir through the mountains.

== See also ==
- List of power stations in Tajikistan
