= Golovnaya Dam =

Dam in Sarband, Khatlon, Tajikistan

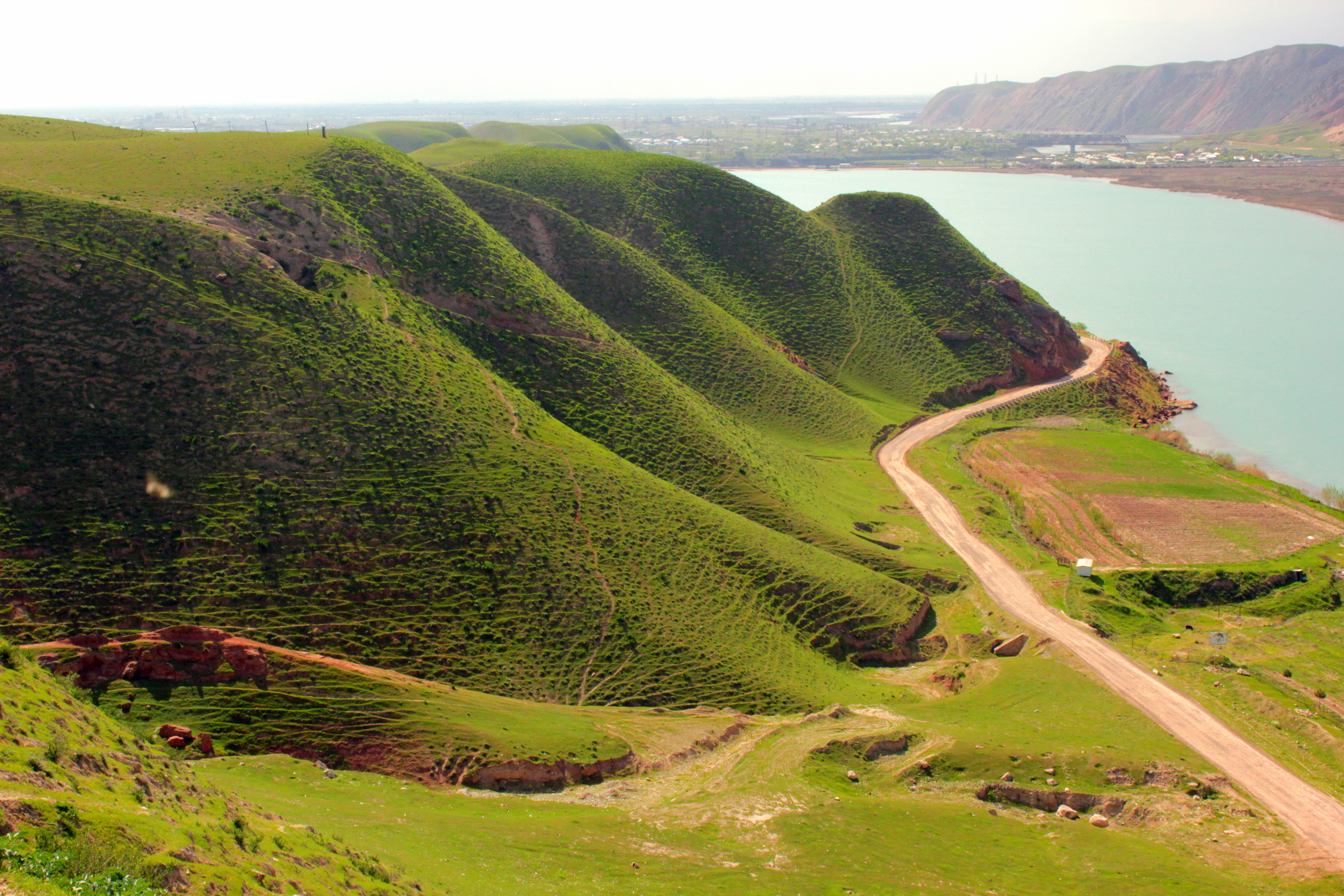

- Location within Tajikistan
- Official name: НБО Сарбанд (Tajik); Сарбандская ГЭС (Russian)
- Country: Tajikistan
- Location: Levakant, Sarband District, Khatlon Province
- Coordinates: 37°53′6.51″N 68°56′14.16″E
- Purpose: Power, irrigation
- Status: Operational
- Opening date: 1962; 64 years ago

Dam and spillways
- Type of dam: Embankment, earth-fill
- Impounds: Vakhsh River
- Height: 50 m (160 ft)

Reservoir
- Total capacity: 96,000,000 m^{3} (78,000 acre⋅ft)
- Normal elevation: 485 m (1,591 ft)

Power Station
- Operator: Barqi Tojik
- Commission date: 1962–1963
- Hydraulic head: 31 m (102 ft)
- Turbines: 3 x 35 MW, 3 x 45 MW Kaplan-type
- Installed capacity: 240 MW
- Annual generation: 900 GWh

The Golovnaya Dam, also known as Sarband Dam, (Tajik: НБО Сарбанд, Russian: Сарбандская ГЭС) is an earth-fill embankment dam on the Vakhsh River just east of Sarband in Khatlon Region, Tajikistan. It lies 14km downstream of Sangtuda 2 Dam and 25km upstream of Perepadnaya (Sharshara) Dam.

The Golovnaya Dam contains one of five hydroelectric power station on the Vakhsh River, that together forms the "Vakhsh Hydropower Cascade". The plant with an installed capacity of 240 MW, is operated by JSC Barqi Tojik. The reservoir and dam serves to provide water to a system of irrigation canals and generate hydroelectric power in the Vakhsh valley.

== History ==
Construction of the Golovnaya Dam and hydroelectric station began in 1956, during the Soviet period, to a design by JSC Hydroproject. Workers brought in for the project formed the settlement of Kalininabad, now known as Levakant. The plant's first two 35 MW hydroelectric generating units were launched in 1962, followed by the remaining four 35 MW generating units in 1963. Together, the six original generating units had a total initial installed capacity of 210 MW.

Between 1984 and 1989, the generator units 4, 5 and 6 were upgraded to utilise the turbines’ higher output capability, increasing each unit's nominal capacity to 45 MW. However, ageing equipment and failures in water control systems subsequently affected the station’s reliability. Generator unit 2 was partially flooded in 1993 and 1994, following problems with the hydraulic system operating the main spillway and sediment sluice gates.

In 2012, generator unit 4 was replaced under a project financed by the Islamic Development Bank. The following year, the Asian Development Bank (ADB) approved a US$136 million grant to replace the remaining five units. Generator unit 4, which had been excluded from the original ADB funded replacement programme, ceased operating in 2019 because of mechanical damage. In August 2024, the ADB approved an additional US$21 million grant for its replacement. The modernisation works are expected to increase the installed capacity of the hydroelectric plant from 240 MW to 274 MW by 2026.

== Design ==
The Golovnaya Hydro Power Plant is equipped with six individual turbine, three of which have a nominal output of around 35 MW each, while the other three have a nominal output of around 45 MW each, giving the station a total nominal capacity of close to 240 MW. Generator units 1 and 2 discharge into an irrigation canal, while the other four return water directly to the Vakhsh River. This arrangement allows water used for electricity generation to be conveyed into the irrigation system which contains the 30 MW Perepadnaya and 15 MW Centralnaya (Markazi) run-of-the-river hydroelectric stations downstream. The power plant's dam is 50 m (164 ft) high, and forms a reservoir with a total storage capacity of about 95 million m^{3}, of which approximately 18 million m^{3} is usable for power generation.

== See also ==
- List of power stations in Tajikistan
