= Iran–Tajikistan relations =

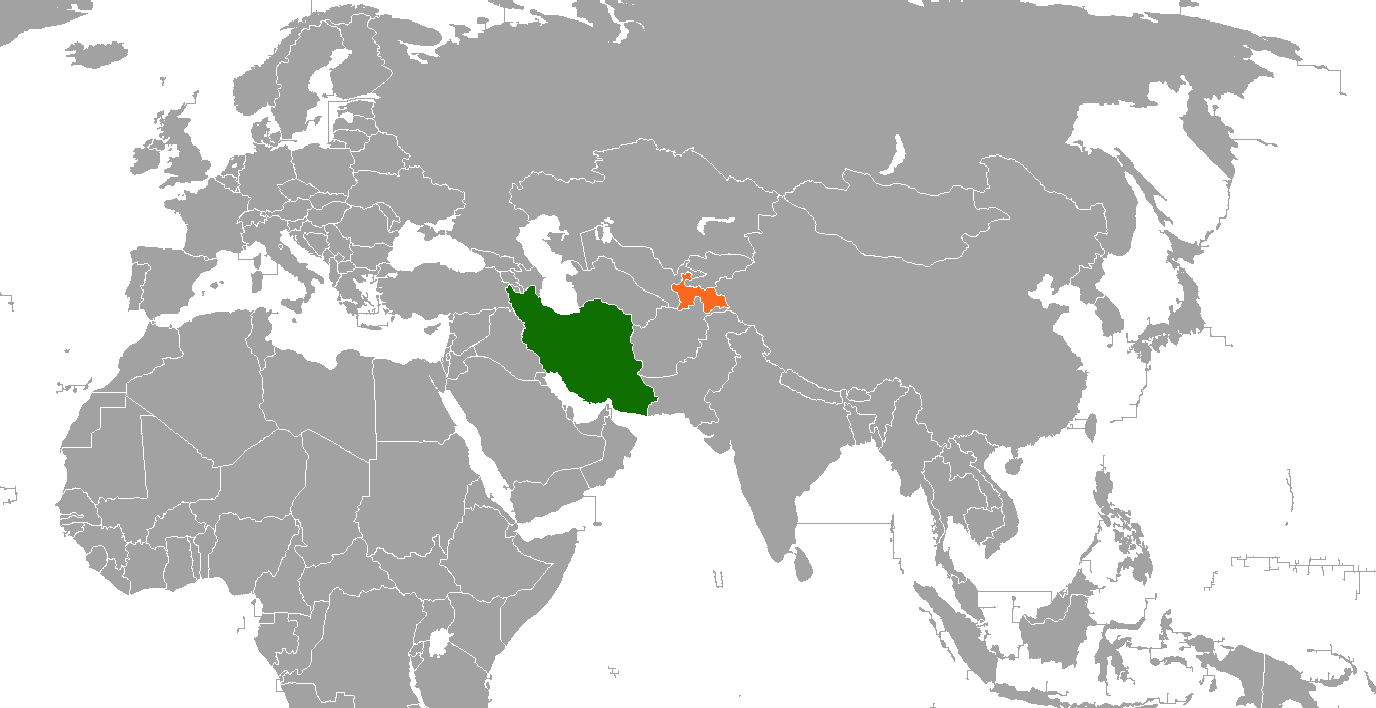

- Iran: Tajikistan

Diplomatic mission
- Embassy of Iran, Dushanbe: Embassy of Tajikistan, Tehran

Iran–Tajikistan relations refer to the bilateral relations between Iran and Tajikistan. The two are sometimes described as "One Spirit in Two Bodies" due to both being Persian-speaking countries. Shared literary contributions, such as the works of Ferdowsi and Rudaki, have provided the basis for extensive cooperation at various levels. The Tajik language is a branch of Persian, and classical literature testify to the long-standing connection between the two nations.

After the collapse of the Soviet Union, Tajikistan relied on its Persian-Iranian heritage to revive its national identity. Iran has also strengthened its cultural influence in Central Asia through various projects in Tajikistan, such as the restoration of the Rudaki Mausoleum and supporting joint cultural events. Since the Soviet collapse, relations have grown stronger in all areas, with officials from both countries regularly traveling to each other’s nations.

The flag of Tajikistan uses the three colors of the Iranian flag (green, white, and red), known as the "Pan-Iranian colors." First adopted as a national symbol in Iran around 1848 during the Qajar Empire, the colors reflect the historical connection of the Iranian civilization. After independence in 1991, Tajikistan used the colors as a symbol of national unity.

== Antiquity ==
The lands of modern-day Tajikistan were an integral part of the Iranian cultural and political world. During the Achaemenid Empire (550–330 BC), the region—known largely as Sogdiana and Bactria—was ruled by Persian satraps and deeply connected to the imperial system of Iran in administration, trade, language, and religion. These areas later remained strongly Iranian in character under the Parthian and Sassanid Empires, serving as vital eastern provinces and major centers of Silk Road commerce. Even after Alexander’s conquest, Iranian identity remained dominant, and the Persian language and traditions continued to shape the region for centuries.

== Tajikistani Civil War and independence ==
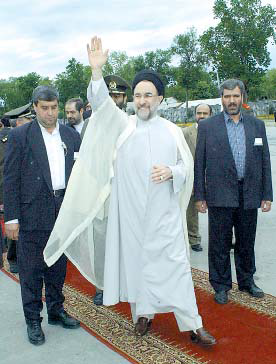
Former President Mohammad Khatami in Tajikistan, April 30, 2002.

Iran was the first nation to establish an embassy in Dushanbe, and was also the first country to extend diplomatic recognition of the newly independent Tajikistan in 1991. Iran provided diplomatic assistance and built new mosques in Tajikistan. Iran has helped encourage Persian cultural exchange through conferences, media, and film festivals.

Iranian television programs, magazines, and books became increasingly common in Tajikistan. Despite the many things the nations have in common, there are also differences. Tajikistan's post communist government is secular while Iran is Islamic. Furthermore, Iran is a predominantly Shia nation while Tajikistan is Sunni.

During the civil war in Tajikistan from 1992 to 1997, Iran offered to mediate between the two factions; however, these efforts did not produce any negotiations. In 1995, Tajikistan opened its first embassy in Tehran, one of the few outside of the former USSR. Relations have since grown stronger, as the two nations cooperate in the energy sector and officials from both nations have supported stronger ties.

== Post-war relations ==
Former President Mahmoud Ahmadinejad of Iran has commented that "Iran and Tajikistan are one spirit in two bodies". He also added that there are no limits to the expansion of relations between the two countries and that "We do not feel that we have a non-Iranian guest with us thanks to the many commonalities our two countries share".

On February 12, 2011, Tajik Foreign Minister Hamrokhon Zarifi, at an event in Dushanbe celebrating the anniversary of the Iranian Revolution, stated: "Today, Tajik society is witnessing the Islamic Republic of Iran's activity and role in the growth and expansion of Tajikistan's economy." Zarifi referenced projects like the Sangtodeh-2 power plant, Anzob Tunnel and Istiklol Tunnel and as examples of Iran's role in the Tajik economy.

== Decline and warming of relations ==
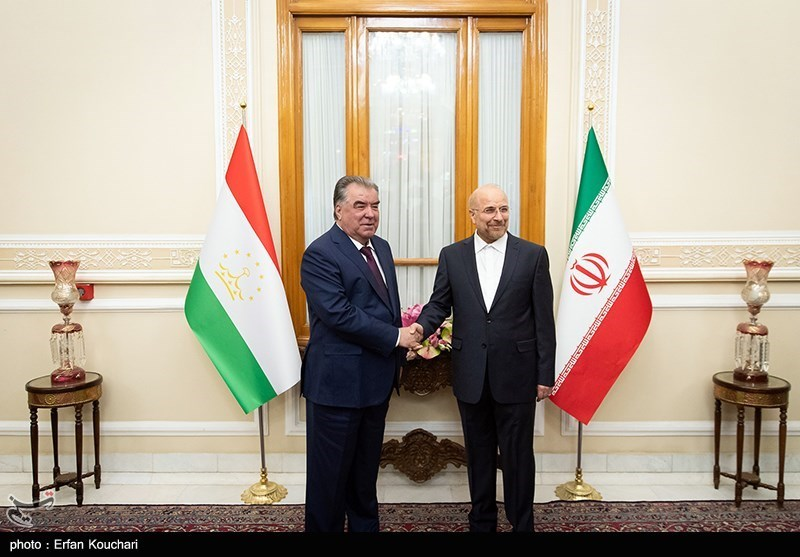
The meeting between Emomali Rahmon, the President of Tajikistan and Mohammad Bagher Ghalibaf, Speaker of the Islamic Consultative Assembly in May 2022 in Tehran.

Relations between Iran and Tajikistan began to deteriorate after the assets of a wanted Iranian oligarch, Babak Zanjani, were confiscated by the Tajik government despite the Iranian government's warnings. Zanjani was charged with money laundering, embezzlement and stealing over $6 billion from the Iranian oil and gas industry. His foreign assets were supposed to be collected as collateral and compensation, but Tajik government refused to hand over the assets and denied that Zanjani had any investment in Tajik Bank. Iran saw this belligerent action by a friendly ally as a betrayal and a sign to reduce further commercial ties and industrial cooperation with Tajikistan.

The invitation of wanted Tajik opposition leader Muhiddin Kabiri by Iran to an Islamic seminary in Iran on December 27–29, 2015, which was warmly received by Iran's Supreme Leader Ali Khamenei, exacerbated the relations even further. Tajikistan immediately issued a note of protest to Iran. Tajikistan's Foreign Ministry summoned Iran's Ambassador to express "regret" against this act, and the head of the Council of Ulema of Tajikistan described Iran's invitation of Kabiri as "abetting terrorism." 2016 was the lowest relationship point between the two countries since Tajikistan obtained independence in 1991.

However, since 2019, relations have been warming again. Tajikistan’s concerns about the security of its borders with Afghanistan, which is controlled by the Taliban, and Kyrgyzstan, which is supported by Turkey and Turkic countries, have made defense cooperation with Iran much more important for the country. On September 17, 2021, Ebrahim Raisi, the then President of Iran, traveled to Tajikistan to attend the Shanghai Cooperation Organization summit. After being officially welcomed by Tajik President Emomali Rahmon, the two sides emphasized the importance of cultural relations. During the meeting, the Iranian President spoke of the beginning of a “new chapter” in relations between the two countries, and eight cooperation documents, mostly in the economic field, were signed.

In 2022, the Chief of Staff of the Iranian Armed Forces inaugurated a drone manufacturing factory in Tajikistan. The same year, Tajik President Emomali Rahmon also visited Iran for the first time in 9 years. On November 8, 2023, President Raisi visited Tajikistan again. The two sides signed several agreements during this visit, including a document abolishing visas between the two countries. Tajik President Emomali Rahmon visited Iran again on 21 May 2023. He traveled to Tehran with an official delegation to offer condolences on the death of President Raisi.

One of the key events in the warming of relations was the official visit of Masoud Pezeshkian, the current President of Iran, to Tajikistan, in 2025. During this visit, he emphasized the importance of linguistic, literary, and cultural commonalities that date back to the ancient times, and stated that this common heritage provides the basis for strengthening relations even further. At the end of their speeches, Pezeshkian and Rahmon recited two verses of Rudaki's poem together, which was met with widespread applause both in the meeting and later on social media.

== Economy ==
As of 2011, Iran is the second largest investor in Tajikistan after China. Revival of the Silk Road in the form of highways connecting China, Tajikistan, Afghanistan and Iran has been a major focus of the two countries. The two sides engage in several energy and infrastructural projects, such as Anzob Tunnel, Sangtuda-2 Hydroelectric Power Plant and the Rogun Dam.

In 2011, the Iranian Ambassador to Tajikistan announced Tehran's plans to construct a $500 million cement production plant in Tajikistan's Khatlon province. A joint television channel is also to be launched with the investment of the Iranian Digital Economy Foundation, and will broadcast programs for Iran, Afghanistan, and Tajikistan.

== High-level visits ==
Guest	Host	Place of visit	Date of visit
(Iran) President Akbar Hashemi Rafsanjani	(Tajikistan) President Emomali Rahmon	Dushanbe, Kulob	May 9–11, 1997
(Iran) President Mohammad Khatami	(Tajikistan) President Emomali Rahmon	Dushanbe, Kulob	April 30-May 1, 2002
(Iran) President Mohammad Khatami	(Tajikistan) President Emomali Rahmon	Dushanbe	September 11–14. 2004
(Iran) President Mahmoud Ahmadinejad	(Tajikistan) President Emomali Rahmon	Dushanbe	July 25–27, 2006
(Iran) President Mahmoud Ahmadinejad	(Tajikistan) President Emomali Rahmon	Dushanbe	August 26–28, 2008
(Iran) President Mahmoud Ahmadinejad	(Tajikistan) President Emomali Rahmon	Dushanbe	January 3, 2010
(Iran) President Mahmoud Ahmadinejad	(Tajikistan) President Emomali Rahmon	Dushanbe	June 2010
(Iran) President Mahmoud Ahmadinejad	(Tajikistan) President Emomali Rahmon	Dushanbe	September 10, 2011
(Iran) President Mahmoud Ahmadinejad	(Tajikistan) President Emomali Rahmon	Dushanbe	October 5, 2011
(Iran) President Mahmoud Ahmadinejad	(Tajikistan) President Emomali Rahmon	Dushanbe	March 20, 2012
(Iran) President Hassan Rouhani	(Tajikistan) President Emomali Rahmon	Dushanbe, Kulob	September 10–13, 2014
(Iran) President Ebrahim Raisi	(Tajikistan) President Emomali Rahmon	Dushanbe, Kulob	September 16–18, 2021
(Tajikistan) President Emomali Rahmon	(Iran) President Ebrahim Raisi	Tehran	May 29–31, 2022
(Iran) President Ebrahim Raisi	(Tajikistan) President Emomali Rahmon	Dushanbe	November 8, 2023
(Tajikistan) President Emomali Rahmon	(Iran) Vice President Mohammad Mokhber	Tehran	May 23, 2024
(Tajikistan) President Emomali Rahmon	(Iran) President Masoud Pezeshkian	Tehran	July 29, 2024
(Iran) President Masoud Pezeshkian	(Tajikistan) President Emomali Rahmon	Dushanbe	January 16, 2025

== Resident diplomatic missions ==
- Iran has an embassy in Dushanbe.
- Tajikistan has an embassy in Tehran and a consulate-general in Mashhad.

== See also ==
- Foreign relations of Iran
- Foreign relations of Tajikistan
