= Dushanbe-2 Power Plant =

Coal-fired power plant in Dushanbe, Tajikistan

- Official name: МБГ-2 ш. Душанбе
- Country: Tajikistan
- Location: Dushanbe
- Coordinates: 38°36′35.4″N 68°46′21.2″E
- Status: Operational
- Commission date: January 2014
- Construction cost: US$349 million
- Owner: Barqi Tojik

Power generation
- Nameplate capacity: 400 MW

The Dushanbe-2 Power Plant (Tajik: МБГ-2 ш. Душанбе) is a coal-fired power station in Dushanbe, Tajikistan.

== History ==
The power plant was commissioned in January 2014 after the construction of the first phase of 50 MW. The second phase of the construction added another 50 MW to the plant installed capacity and was commissioned in November 2014. The third phase of the construction added another 300 MW and was commissioned in 2016.

== Finance ==
The power plant was constructed with a cost of US$349 million. It was funded by loan from the Export–Import Bank of China.

== See also ==
- List of power stations in Tajikistan
