= Levakant =

Levakant Левакант
- Location in Tajikistan
- Coordinates: 37°52′N 68°55′E
- Country: Tajikistan
- Region: Khatlon Region
- Elevation: 672 m (2,205 ft)

Population (2020)
  - City: 17,700
  - Urban: 48,300
- Official languages: Russian (Interethnic); Tajik (State)

Levakant (Russian: Левакант; Tajik: Левакант, Kalininabad (Калилининобод) until February 1996, Sarband (Сарбанд) until January 2018), is a city in south-west Tajikistan. It is part of Khatlon Region, located just east of the regional capital Bokhtar and about 120 km south of the national capital Dushanbe. The Golovnaya Dam on the river Vakhsh lies directly to its east.

Its population is estimated at 17,700 for the city proper and 48,300 for the city with the outlying communities (2020).

Levakant is home to Tajikistan's only fertilizer manufacturing plant, Tajik Azot.

== Climate ==
Levakant has a hot-summer Mediterranean climate (Köppen climate classification Csa).

Climate data for Sarband
Month	Jan	Feb	Mar	Apr	May	Jun	Jul	Aug	Sep	Oct	Nov	Dec	Year
Mean daily maximum °C (°F)	7.9 (46.2)	11.0 (51.8)	16.7 (62.1)	23.8 (74.8)	29.4 (84.9)	35.4 (95.7)	37.1 (98.8)	35.5 (95.9)	31.0 (87.8)	24.6 (76.3)	16.9 (62.4)	10.5 (50.9)	23.3 (74.0)
Mean daily minimum °C (°F)	−1.1 (30.0)	1.0 (33.8)	5.9 (42.6)	11.3 (52.3)	15.1 (59.2)	18.6 (65.5)	20.1 (68.2)	18.1 (64.6)	13.1 (55.6)	8.6 (47.5)	3.9 (39.0)	0.9 (33.6)	9.6 (49.3)
Average precipitation mm (inches)	43 (1.7)	52 (2.0)	77 (3.0)	55 (2.2)	35 (1.4)	3 (0.1)	0 (0)	0 (0)	0 (0)	14 (0.6)	26 (1.0)	39 (1.5)	344 (13.5)
Source: Climate-data.org

== Subdivisions ==
Before ca. 2018, Levakant was the seat of Sarband District, which covered the present city of Levakant. The city of Levakant covers Levakant proper and two jamoats. These are as follows:

Jamoat	Population (Jan. 2015)
Guliston	18,151
Vahdat	8,040

== See also ==
- List of cities in Tajikistan
