= Bekabad =

Bekabad Bekobod
- City
- Location in Uzbekistan
- Coordinates: 40°13′0″N 69°13′0″E
- Country: Uzbekistan
- Region: Tashkent Region
- City status: 1945

Population (2021)
  - Total: 96,900
- Time zone: UTC+5 (UZT)
  - Summer (DST): UTC+5 (not observed)
- Postal code: 110500
- Area code: +998 9091

Bekobod (Uzbek: Bekobod/Бекобод formerly Begovat) is a district-level city in Tashkent Region, eastern Uzbekistan. It lies along both banks of the Syr Darya River near Uzbekistan's border with Tajikistan.

Bekobod originally arose in connection with a cement plant. It received the status of a city in 1945. Until 1964, the city was known as Begovat.

Bekobod underwent rapid industrialization during the Soviet era. It has retained some of its industrial importance. Bekobod is home to a large steel mill and a cement factory. The Farkhad Dam and Farkhad Hydroelectric Plant lie just upstream from the city.

== History ==
Bekobod originally arose in connection with a cement plant. From 1942 to 1944, a steel plant was constructed in the town. from 1943 to 1948, the Farkhad Dam and Farkhad Hydroelectric Plant were built near Bekobod. The latter is a major source of electricity and irrigation water for Uzbekistan.

Bekobod received city status in 1945. Until 1964, the city was known as Begovat.

== Geography ==
Bekobod lies along both banks of the Syr Darya River near Uzbekistan's border with Tajikistan. There are mountains to the northeast and southeast of the city. By road it is 140 kilometres (87 mi) south of Tashkent.

=== Climate ===
Bekobod has a hot-summer Mediterranean climate (Köppen climate classification Csa) with continental influences. It has cold winters and hot summers. The average June–July temperature is 28–30 °C (82–86 °F). Sometimes the average June–July temperature reaches 40 °C (104 °F). The mean temperature in January is −2 – −3 °C (28–27 °F).

Climate data for Bekobod
Month	Jan	Feb	Mar	Apr	May	Jun	Jul	Aug	Sep	Oct	Nov	Dec	Year
Mean daily maximum °C	5	9	16	23	29	35	36	35	30	23	14	7	22
Mean daily minimum °C	−4	−2	4	9	14	18	19	16	11	6	2	−2	8
Average precipitation mm	43.5	47.9	47.4	49.5	44.8	18.5	37.2	14	14.9	26.5	46.8	50.7	441.7
Mean daily maximum °F	41	48	61	73	84	95	97	95	86	73	57	45	71
Mean daily minimum °F	25	28	39	48	57	64	66	61	52	43	36	28	46
Average precipitation inches	1.71	1.89	1.87	1.95	1.76	0.73	1.46	0.6	0.59	1.04	1.84	2.00	17.44

== Demographics ==
In 2021, Bekobod had a population of 96,900. Representatives of many ethnic groups can be found in the city. Uzbeks are the largest ethnic group.

Historical population
Year	Pop.	±% p.a.
1959	40,000	—
1970	58,000	+3.44%
1982	73,000	+1.94%
2000	84,400	+0.81%
2009	101,292	+2.05%
2021	96,900	−0.37%

== Economy ==
Bekobod remains an important industrial city in independent Uzbekistan. It is home to a large steel mill and a cement factory. There is also a brick factory, a meat-packing plant, a cotton plant, and many small and medium enterprises. The Farkhad Dam and Farkhad Hydroelectric Plant lie just upstream from the city.

== Education ==
Bekobod has a medical institute and a vocational school.

== Notable people ==
- Shoxrux Abduxalilov (born 1999), actor
