= Joseph Karakis =

Soviet architect and urban planner (1902–1988)

- Born: 29 May 1902; Balta, Russian Empire
- Died: 23 February 1988 (aged 85); Kiev, Ukrainian SSR, Soviet Union
- Occupation: Architect
- Buildings: National Museum of the History of Ukraine

Signature
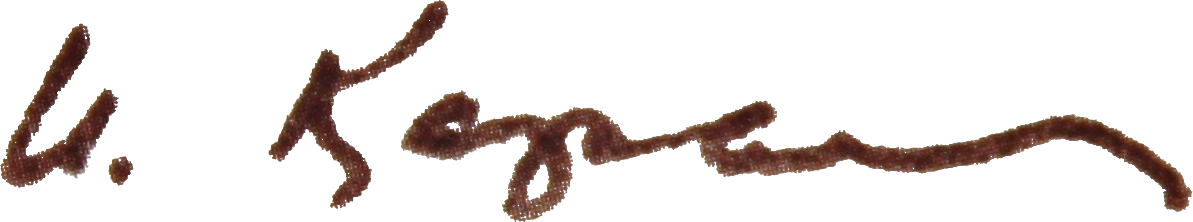

Joseph Yulievich Karakis (or Iosif Karakys; Ukrainian: Йосип Юлійович Каракіс; Russian: Иосиф Юльевич Каракис; 29 May 1902 – 23 February 1988) was a Soviet architect, urban planner, painter, and teacher. He is regarded by some as one of the most prolific architects in Kiev, designing numerous buildings that are now considered architectural landmarks.

More than two thousand schools across the Soviet Union were constructed based on Karakis's designs, and in total, more than four thousand buildings were built from his architectural projects.

== Biography ==
Joseph Karakis was born on 29 May 1902 in the town of Balta to Julius Borisovich Karakis (1879–1943), co-owner and worker of a sugar factory in Turbin, and Frida Yakovlevna Karakis (née Geybtman; 1882–1968). He was the eldest child in the family and had a younger brother, David Yulievich Karakis (1904–1970), who became a physician and served as a colonel and chief medical officer during World War II.

From 1909 to 1917, Karakis studied at the Realschule in Vinnytsia while attending evening drawing classes taught by Abraham Cherkassky. In 1918, he worked as a painter-decorator at the Vinnytsia Theatre, under Matvii Drak, for the troupe of Hnat Yura, Amvrosy Buchma, and Marian Krushelnytsky. The following year, he joined the Red Army as a volunteer, serving as an artist for the propaganda train. In 1921, he worked as an artist for the Vinnytsia Commission on Monuments and Art of Antiquity, where he contributed to the establishment of the city museum's art gallery and library using the collection from Princess Branitskaya's mansion in Nemyriv.

In 1922, Karakis was admitted to the Institute of National Economy at the Faculty of Law. A year later, he entered the Kiev Art Institute, studying in the Faculty of Painting. During his studies, he worked as a theatre artist (from 1925 to 1926) under the direction of Nicholas Burachek. In 1925, influenced by James Steinberg, he transferred from the third year of his art major to the first year of the architecture department.

In 1926, while still studying, Karakis worked as a senior technician in the construction of the Kiev railway station under the supervision of his teacher Alexander Verbitsky. He later assisted in the design and construction of the Academy of Sciences building and the first residential building in Ukraine for doctors' families, located at 17 Velyka Zhytomyrska Street in Kiev.

In 1927, he secretly married Anna Kopman (1904–1993), a piano student at the Conservatory who was known as one of Kiev's beauties.

Karakis graduated in 1929 with a degree in architecture. He studied under P. Aleshin, A. Verbitsky, and V. Rykov. In 1931, he received an invitation to teach at the Kiev Construction Institute. Before World War II, Karakis designed several residential and public buildings, including the Jewish Theatre in Kiev and the National Museum of Ukraine. In 1941, he became an associate professor of architectural design at KARI.

During the war, he worked on the construction of heavy machinery factories under Rostankoproekt in Rostov-on-Don and later in Tashkent. From 1942 to 1944, Karakis served as the chief architect of the Farkhad Dam, where he designed the dam, diversion channels, machinery facilities, and housing for workers. After the war, he worked at Kiev Giprograd and the Civil Engineering Institute. From 1948, he was head of the Institute of the Art Industry at the USSR Academy of Architecture.

In 1951, following another ideological purge, he was dismissed from his position. He was reportedly one of the few who defended the preservation of historical monuments during the Soviet campaign against "cosmopolitanism."

From 1952, Karakis worked at Giprograd on model design projects. Between 1963 and 1976, he headed the Design Department at the Architecture School of KievZNIIEP. In 1977, at the invitation of B. E. Yasievich (1929–1992), he briefly joined the Kiev Research Institute of History, Theory, and Prospective Problems of Soviet Architecture, where he worked on a project titled "Housing of the Near Future," aimed at residential development in Kiev.

Karakis died on 23 February 1988 and was buried at Baikove Cemetery beside his mother.

== Projects ==
=== In Kyiv ===
- Art School (now the National Museum of the History of Ukraine) (1938)
- House of Officers – 30/1 Hrushevsky Street (currently houses the Central Museum of the Armed Forces of Ukraine)
- Stairs and retaining wall with lanterns at the entrance to the National Museum of the History of Ukraine from Volodymyrska Street
- "Model" School No. 29 (co-authored with G. Voloshinov and P. Aleshin; 1929)
- Residential building for the Holosiiv Forestry Institute (1931)
- House of the Red Army and Navy in Kyiv (1932)
- Reconstruction of the Aviahorod Club (1933–1934)
- Restaurant "Dynamo," near the Dynamo Stadium (1932–1934)
- Music School and Concert Hall on Conservatory Alley (1936–1937)
- Reconstruction of the Theatre of the Red Army on Meringovska Street (1938)
- Jewish Theatre, 17 Khreshchatyk Street (1939)
- Ten-storey residential building in the constructivist style on Mazeppa (January Uprising) Street (1934–1937)
- Residential building, 3 January Uprising Street (1934–1936)
- Government Quarter (1935–1936)
- Residential building, 15–17 Instytutska Street (formerly 25 October Street) (1935–1937)
- Residential building, St. George Street (1937)
- Residential building for senior officers, Zolotovorotska Street (1936)
- River Station, co-authored with N. Holostenko (1940)
- Residential building, 12 Striletska Street (1939–1940)
- Residential complex for the State Planning Commission, 25 October Street (1938–1941)
- Second stage of the residential block, 5 January Uprising Street (1939–1940)
- Housing for the pilot plant, German and Laboratory Streets (1939–1940)
- Gallery-type residential building for workers of Kyiv Shoe Factory No. 4 (1940–1941; rebuilt in 1949). The design, typical of southern regions, featured staircases on both sides and open gallery access to apartments, reducing construction costs by 15%.
- Gallery-type houses with 50 apartments on Vyshhorod and Nekrasov Streets (1939–1941)
- Building at 29 Khreshchatyk Street (destroyed during the explosion on Khreshchatyk, 1941)
- Machining shop for the pilot plant (1940)
- Experimental School, 12 Boulevard of Peoples' Friendship (1958)
- Model School (1953–1955)
- Experimental School No. 80 (1960; featured a square with a fountain in front)

=== In Begovat (Central Asia) ===
- Farkhad Dam complex: dam, machinery room, diversion canal (2 km long), and aqueduct (1942–1944)
- Housing estates "Farhadskaya GES-1000" and "GES-500" (1943–1945)
- Detached house for the construction management of the Farkhad Hydroelectric Station (1943)

=== In Kryvyi Rih, Vinnytsia, and other cities ===
- Cinema for 1,000 spectators (1934–1935)

=== In Kryvyi Rih ===
- Sotsgorod residential district (1933–1936)

=== In Kharkiv ===
- House of the Red Army and Navy (1934)
- House of Cooperative Societies (co-authored with V. I. Zabolotny and P. Yurchenko; draft, 1940)
- School on Louis Pasteur Street (awarded first prize in the contest for best building, 1954)

=== In Ozerne (formerly Skhomorokhy, Zhytomyr Oblast) ===
- House of the Red Army (1933–1934)

=== In Komsomolsk ===
- Music School

=== In Kramatorsk ===
- Palace of Culture named after Stalin (co-authored with L. Yurovsky; draft, 1940)
- Experimental School (1962)

=== In Luhansk ===
- Hotel "October" (now "Ukraine") (1947–1952)

=== In Moscow ===
- Kursk Railway Station (co-authored with L. Yurchenko and S. Tatarenko; draft, 1932)

=== In Voroshilovgrad ===
- School
- Museum of the Revolution (project, 1940)

=== In Tashkent ===
- Abrasive Works (1942)
- School No. 110 named after Shevchenko for 2,600 students in the Ukrainian district (1969)

=== In Chișinău ===
- Monument to Kotovsky (co-authored with sculptor L. D. Muravina; competition entry, 1947)

=== Other projects ===
- Pilot schools for children recovering from cerebral palsy in Odessa and Berdyansk (1963)
- Experimental school for children with intellectual disabilities in Zaporizhzhia (1964)
- School with square classrooms in Kramatorsk (1965)
- Pavilion-type school building for 2,032 students in Donetsk on the Kalmius River (1965)
- Pilot school buildings of large capacity in Makhachkala, Baku, Voroshilovgrad, and Dniprodzerzhynsk (1966–1969)
- School in Komsomolsk
- Between 1953 and 1975, together with a team of colleagues, Karakis developed over 40 standard designs for secondary schools, boarding schools, and music schools. More than 4,000 buildings were constructed across Ukraine and other republics of the USSR based on these designs (1954–1980s).

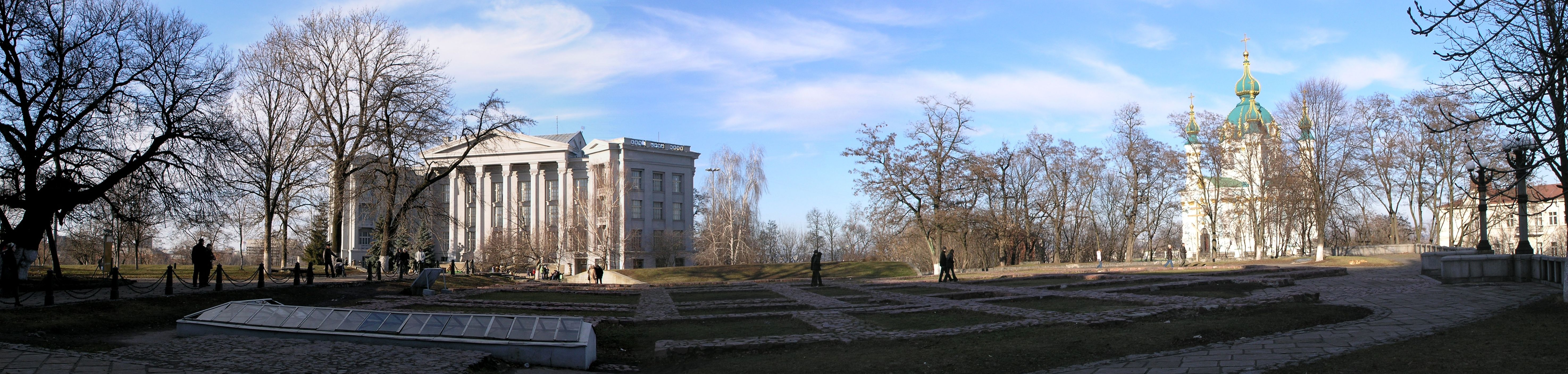
Panorama of Kyiv with Karakis's building on the left

== Selected publications ==
=== In Ukrainian ===
- "Яким повинно бути житло // Більшовик. – 1936. – 5 серпня. – № 181."
- "Про план житлового осередку // Соціалістичний Київ. – 1936. – № 6 (співавтор І. Дубов)."
- "Школи художнього виховання // Соціалістичний Київ. – 1937. – № 2."
- "Жилий квартал над Дніпром // Соціалістичний Київ. – 1937. – № 4."
- "Будівництво і проектування сільських шкіл на Україні // Радянська школа. – 1938. – № 4."
- "Колгоспний клуб // Архітектура Радянської України. – 1941. – № 6."
- "Москва радянська // Вісник Академії архітектури УРСР. – 1947. – № 2."
- "Нова, незвична… // Київський будівельник. – 1960. – 16 червня. – № 24."

=== In Russian ===
- "За комплексную застройку // Архитектурная газета. – 1936. – 8 июня. – № 32."
- "Жилой дом на Украине // Архитектурная газета. – 1937. – 18 апреля. – № 22."
- "Архитектура жилья на Украине: 20 лет Великой Социалистической революции // Архитектурная газета. – 1937. – 8 октября. – № 69."
- "Экспериментальное проектирование жилых микрорайонов // Вестник ГИПРОГРАДа. – К., 1946."
- "Хозяйственные сооружения в системе двухэтажной жилой застройки // Техническая информация / ГИПРОГРАД. – К., 1952. – № 3."
- "Здание гостиницы в г. Ворошиловграде // Техническая информация / ГИПРОГРАД. – К., 1952. – № 14."
- "Экспериментальный проект жилого дома галерейного типа на 72 квартиры // Техническая информация / ГИПРОГРАД. – К., 1956. – № 1."
- "Галерейные жилые дома // Архитектура СССР. – 1957. – № 4."
- "Типовое проектирование школ-интернатов // Строительство и архитектура. – 1957. – № 3; Будівництво і архітектура. – 1957. – № 3."
- "К вопросу проектирования новых типов школьных зданий (Из опыта типового проектирования ГИПРОГРАДа) // Проектирование и строительство школьных зданий. – К., 1958."
- "Средняя школа на 400 учащихся: Некоторые конструктивные и планировочные особенности школьных зданий, проектируемых из крупных стеновых блоков // Проектирование и строительство школьных зданий. – К., 1958."
- "Однокомнатные квартиры в галерейном доме // Строительство и архитектура. – 1958. – № 1; Будівництво і архітектура. – 1958. – № 1 (соавтор Х. Заривайская)."
- "Типовой проект семилетней музыкальной школы на 200–300 учащихся // Техническая информация / ГИПРОГРАД. – К., 1958. – № 7 (134)."
- "Пути улучшения экономических и бытовых качеств жилья // Техническая информация / ГИПРОГРАД. – К., 1958. – № 8–9 (135–136)."
- "Новые типовые проекты // Техническая информация / ГИПРОГРАД. – К., 1958. – № 10."
- "Жилые дома галерейного типа для строительства в VII и VIII пятилетках // Техническая информация / ГИПРОГРАД. – К., 1958. – № 10."
- "Типовой проект семилетней музыкальной школы на 200–300 учащихся // Техническая информация / ГИПРОГРАД. – К., 1958. – № 7."
- "Новые типовые проекты: О домах галерейного типа // Жилищное строительство. – 1958. – № 11."
- "Пути улучшения планировки жилья // Строительство и архитектура. – 1959. – № 1; Будівництво і архітектура. – 1959. – № 1."
- "Жилой корпус на 600 воспитанников [школы-интерната] в Киеве // Строительство и архитектура. – 1959. – № 2 (соавторы Н. Савченко, А. Волненко)."
- "Номенклатура домов галерейного типа для строительства в Украинской ССР // Жилищное строительство. – 1959. – № 2."
- "От эксперимента – к массовому строительству: Комплексная серия типовых проектов школ и школ-интернатов // Строительство и архитектура. – 1960. – № 11 (соавтор В. Городской)."
- "Экспериментальная школа в Киеве // Жилищное строительство. – 1961. – № 4."
- "Кооперирование и размещение школ и школьных городков в современной жилой застройке // Архитектура учебно-воспитательных зданий в жилой застройке. – М., 1976."
- "Жилище ближайшего будущего (Научно-творческое поисковое исследование): Отчет о НИР / Киевский научно-исследовательский институт теории, истории и перспективных проблем советской архитектуры (нині – НІІТІАГ). Інв. № 1071. – К., 1977. – 29 с."

== Students ==
Many individuals regarded themselves as students of Karakis. Most of them studied or worked with him between 1933 and 1952, and several later became well-known Soviet and Ukrainian architects. Among them were Anatoly Dobrovolsky, Abraham Moiseevich Miletsky, Yuri Aseev, Valentin Ezhov, Vadim Skugarev, Boris Zhezherin, Anatoly Ignaschenko, Viktor Chepelyk, Zoya V. Moiseenko, Boris M. Davidson (whom Karakis assisted in defending his doctoral thesis in architecture), and Yuriy Khimich, among others.

Some of his students later pursued careers in writing, including Viktor Nekrasov and Leonid Serpilin. Another student, Volodymyr Dakhno, became a noted animation film director.

Karakis's daughter, Irma Karakis, was also among his students. She later earned a PhD in architecture and became a senior researcher, serving as head of the interior design department at KievZNIIEP.
