= Kayrakkum Reservoir =

Artificial lake in Sughd Province, Tajikistan

Coordinates: 40°23′40″N 70°10′53″E

- Обанбори Қайроққум (Tajik); Кайраккумское водохранилище (Russian)
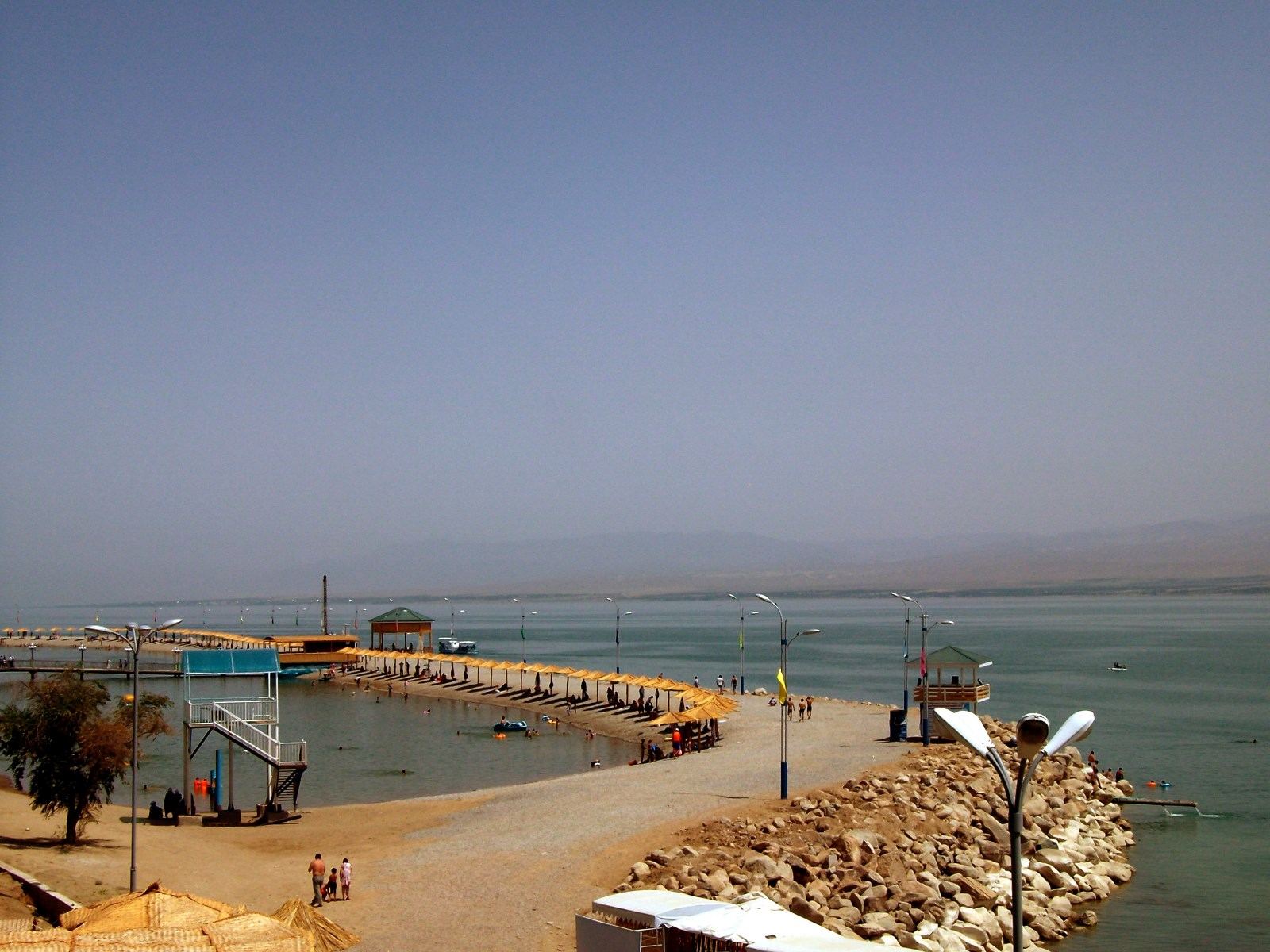
- Kayrakkum Reservoir
- Interactive map of Kayrakkum Reservoir
- Location: Ghafurov District, Sughd Province, Tajikistan
- Type: Artificial lake
- Primary inflows: Syr Darya River
- Primary outflows: Syr Darya River
- Basin countries: Tajikistan
- Max. length: 56 km (35 mi)
- Max. width: 15 km (9.3 mi)
- Surface area: 523 km^{2} (202 sq mi)
- Average depth: Max: 25 m (82 ft); Average: 7 m (23 ft)
- Settlements: Khujand

Ramsar Wetland
- Designated: 18 July 2001
- Reference no.: 1083

Kayrakkum Reservoir (Tajik: Обанбори Қайроққум; Russian: Кайраккумское водохранилище), also spelled variously as Qayroqqum, Qayraqqum, Kayrakum or Kairakum, is a large artificial lake in Ghafurov District of Sughd Province, in northwestern Tajikistan. In 2016, the reservoir was renamed Tajik Sea (Tajik: Баҳри Тоҷик) by the country's parliament. The reservoir lies in the western part of the Fergana Valley on the Syr Darya river. The provincial capital of Khujand lies about 15 km (9.3 mi) west of the dam. It is also a Ramsar site.

== Description ==
The reservoir created by the Kayrakkum Dam has a surface area of 523 km^{2} (202 sq mi); its length is 56 km (35 mi) and maximum width 15 km (9.3 mi). Its maximum depth near the dam at its western end is 25 m (82 ft); the average depth is 8 m (26 ft). At the other end, the head of the reservoir is silted up for a distance of 10–15 km (6.2–9.3 mi), a consequence of the construction of the Toktogul hydroelectric power station upstream on the Naryn River in Kyrgyzstan. By 2009, the reservoir lost an estimated one-third of its full volume to silt. Silted areas are characterised by multiple small lakes and shallows, with tugay vegetation of tamarisk, oleaster, poplar thickets and reed beds, supporting many thousands of wintering waterfowl, waders and birds of prey. The climate of the region is continental and semi-arid.

== Construction ==
The construction of the Kayrakkum Dam for irrigation and hydroelectricity generation purposes began in the Kayrakkum steppe in July 1951. Starting in 1954, about 2,400 families or an estimated 12,000 people were resettled from some 20 villages located in the reservoir area. Most of these people were moved to the new cotton producing areas in northern Tajikistan. In 1956, the dam was completed and the filling of the reservoir began.

== Important Bird Area ==
A 1,150 km^{2} (440 sq mi) tract of land encompassing the reservoir and its surrounds has been identified as an Important Bird Area (IBA) by BirdLife International because it supports significant numbers of the populations of various bird species, either as residents, or as overwintering, breeding or passage migrants. These include mallards, pygmy cormorants, saker falcons, cinereous vultures, great bustards, houbara bustards, common cranes, pale-backed pigeons, pallid scops-owls, Egyptian nightjars, European rollers, white-winged woodpeckers, great tits, desert larks, streaked scrub-warblers, Sykes's warblers, Asian desert warblers, saxaul sparrows and desert finches.
