= Kayrakkum Dam =

Dam in Kayrakkum Ghafurov District, Sughd Province, Tajikistan

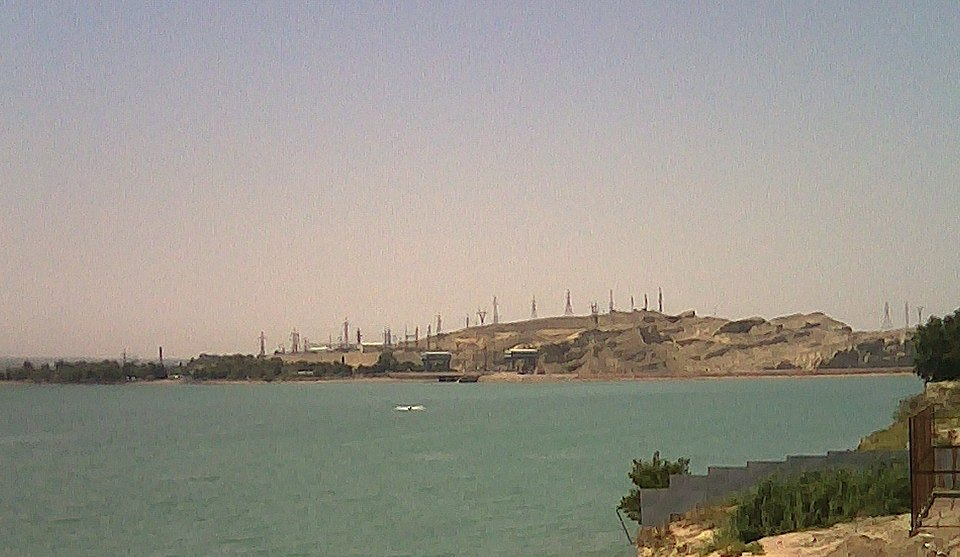

- Location within Tajikistan
- Country: Tajikistan
- Location: Kayrakkum Ghafurov District, Sughd Province
- Coordinates: 40°16′37.27″N 69°48′58.02″E
- Purpose: Irrigation, power
- Status: Operational
- Construction began: 1952
- Opening date: 1959; 67 years ago

Dam and spillways
- Type of dam: Embankment
- Impounds: Syr Darya River
- Height: 32 m (105 ft)
- Length: 1,202 m (3,944 ft)
- Elevation at crest: 351.5 m (1,153 ft)
- Spillway capacity: 3,960 m^{3}/s (140,000 cu ft/s)

Reservoir
- Creates: Kayrakkum Reservoir
- Total capacity: 4,200,000,000 m^{3} (3,400,000 acre⋅ft)
- Active capacity: 2,300,000,000 m^{3} (1,900,000 acre⋅ft)
- Inactive capacity: 1,900,000,000 m^{3} (1,500,000 acre⋅ft)
- Catchment area: 136,000 km^{2} (53,000 mi^{2})
- Surface area: 513 km^{2} (198 mi^{2})
- Normal elevation: 347.5 m (1,140 ft)

Power Station
- Operator: Barki Tojik
- Commission date: 1956-1957
- Type: Conventional
- Turbines: 6 x 21 MW Kaplan-type
- Installed capacity: 126 MW

The Kayrakkum Dam (Russian: Кайраккумская ГЭС; Tajik: НБО Қайроққум), also spelt variously as Kayrakum, Kairakum, Qayraqqum or Qayroqqum, is an embankment dam on the Syr Darya River near the town of Kayrakkum in Sughd Province, Tajikistan. It is situated on the western edge of the Fergana Valley and creates Kayrakkum Reservoir. The reservoir supplies water for irrigation, primarily in Uzbekistan downstream, and hydroelectric power production. The reservoir is also a Ramsar site. The dam's power station has an installed capacity of 126 MW and is operated by Barki Tojik. Construction on the dam began in 1952. It began to impound its reservoir in 1956 and the first two generators were commissioned that year. The other four were operational in 1957 and the project was complete in 1959. The power station is currently undergoing a rehabilitation which should be completed in 2020. Two new and larger turbines will increase the installed capacity to 142 MW.

The 32 m (105 ft) tall and 1,202 m (3,944 ft) long embankment dam is filled with sand, gravel and rock. Its spillway and power station are co-located on the left side of the dam in a gravity dam section. The spillway contains six maintenance gates and six operational gates with a total discharge capacity of 3,960 m^{3}/s (140,000 cu ft/s). The power station houses six 21 MW Kaplan turbine-generators. Kayrakkum Reservoir has a total storage capacity of 4,200,000,000 m^{3} (3,400,000 acre⋅ft) and surface of 513 km^{2} (198 mi^{2}). Of the total reservoir capacity, 2,300,000,000 m^{3} (1,900,000 acre⋅ft) can be used for irrigation downstream and/or power generation. 1,900,000,000 m^{3} (1,500,000 acre⋅ft) is dead or unusable storage.

== See also ==
- Farkhad Dam – downstream
