= Shoxrux Abduxalilov =

Uzbek actor (born 1999)

- Born: Shoxrux Abduxalilov; February 19, 1999 (age 27); Bekabad, Uzbekistan
- Citizenship: Uzbekistan
- Education: Yeoju Institute of Technology; Plekhanov Russian University of Economics; University of West London; University of World Economy and Diplomacy
- Occupation: Actor; Film producer
- Years active: 2007–present

Shoxrux Abduxalilov (Uzbek: Шохрух Абдухалилов) (born February 19, 1999) is an Uzbek actor and film producer. Abduxalilov received widespread recognition and acclaim in Uzbekistan after starring in the 2009 Uzbek drama Chol va Nabira. He has been nominated for several awards, including the Uzbekfilm Award and two Golden Cheetah Awards, as well as two M&TV Film Awards and two NTT Awards.

== Life ==
Abduxalilov was born on February 19, 1999, in the city of Bekobod, Tashkent region, into an intellectual family. After graduating from two schools in Bekobad, Shoxrux entered the Academic Lyceum of the World University of Economy and Diplomacy in Tashkent. After graduating from the Academic Lyceum, Shoxrux entered Yodzhu University in Tashkent. After studying business administration and international economic relations there, he decided to go to London to study. In London, he studied business administration, commerce, and finance at the University of West London. After graduating from this university, he returned to Tashkent. He completed his master's degree at the Tashkent branch of the Russian University of Economics, ⁣named after G.V. Plekanov.

== Career ==
Shoxrux began his career in 2007, playing a supporting role in the famous Uzbek film “Boʻrilar”, after which he also participated in one of the episodes of the film “Jazo”. Shoxrux's first small game arose from the role of Alisher in the project "Chol va Nabira", after which he began to be invited to larger roles. This happened in the Uzbek film"Umid", where the actor debuted in the state film as the main character

He also got one of the biggest roles in the series "Dada." In 2011, Shoxrux played the role of a supporting character in the project "Farzandim" by director Elyor Xoshimov. However, Shoxrux gained great recognition and fame as a film actor after appearing in the film "Sariq qalpoqcha" in the fall of 2012.

The movie "Sariq qoripaqcha 2" did not bring him much fame. This image has become a characteristic of the actor. After that, Shah rukh received many film offers and played several roles in the films "Farzandim 2", "Uylanish muammosi", "Oyqiz ertagi". In 2020, Shoxrux also began his production career; his first production activity, “Sensiz,” is expected to be screened in Uzbek cinemas soon. In addition to acting, Shoxrux is also involved in business.

== Filmography ==
Below is a chronologically ordered list of films in which Shoxrux Abduxalilov has appeared.

Year	Movie	Role	Grades
2007	Bo'rilar		
2007	Jazo		
2009	Chol va nabira		
2009	So'nggi lahza		
2010	Dada		
2011	Farzandim		
2012	Sariq qalpoqcha		
2013	Farzandim 2		
2014	Sariq qalpoqcha 2		
2015	Uylanish muammosi		
2016	Virus		
2016	Oyqiz ertagi		
2017	Asir vobosi		
2020	Sensiz		

== Awards and recognitions ==
Year	Otorgar	Category	Movie	Resultado
2007	M&TV Awards	The youngest male actor.	Boʻrilar	Won
2008	NTT Awards	The youngest male actor.	Jazo	Nominated
2009	Yoshlar Awards	The youngest male actor.	Jazo	Won
2009	M&TV Awards	Little high school kids make the best actors	So'nggi lahza	Won
2009	The golden cheetah	Little high school kids make the best actors	Chol va nabira	Nominated
2016	My5 Awards	The most elegant mold-breaking star (male)	Virus	Won
2016	My5 Awards	The most elegant popup icon	Oyqiz ertagi	Nominated
