= Mughob =

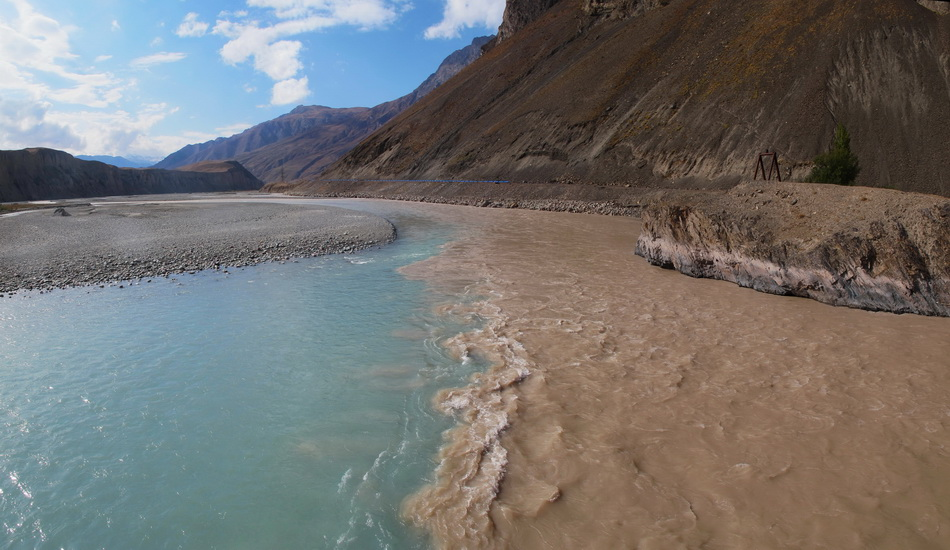
- confluence of the Mughob and the (upper) Kyzyl-Suu rivers

Location
- Country: Tajikistan

Physical characteristics
- Source: confluence of Seldara and Sauksay
  - coordinates: 39.171°N 72.236°E
- Mouth: Vakhsh
  - coordinates: 39.2689°N 71.3799°E
- Length: 88 km (55 mi)
- Basin size: 7,070 km^{2} (2,730 sq mi)
- Discharge
  - average: 100 m^{3}/s (3,500 cu ft/s)

Basin features
- Progression: Vakhsh→ Amu Darya→ Aral Sea

The Mughob (Russian: Мугоб, Tajik: Муғоб; until 31 July 2023 Muksu) is a west-flowing river in northeastern Tajikistan. It is a tributary of the Vakhsh which in turn is a tributary of the Amu Darya. The river is 88 kilometres (55 mi) long and has a basin area of 7,070 square kilometres (2,730 mi^{2}). It is formed at the confluence of the rivers Seldara (draining the Vanch-Yakh Glacier) and Sauksay (draining the Saukdara Glaciers), near Altyn Mazar. The north side of its valley is the Trans-Alay Range and the south side is formed by the Peter I Range and the Academy of Sciences Range. It joins the Kyzyl-Suu (which drains the Alay Valley) to form the Surkhob or Vakhsh. At Altyn Mazar there is a pass leading north to Daroot-Korgon in the Alay Valley.
