= Sangtuda 2 Hydroelectric Power Plant =

Dam in Danghara, Khatlon, Tajikistan

Sangtuda 2 Dam
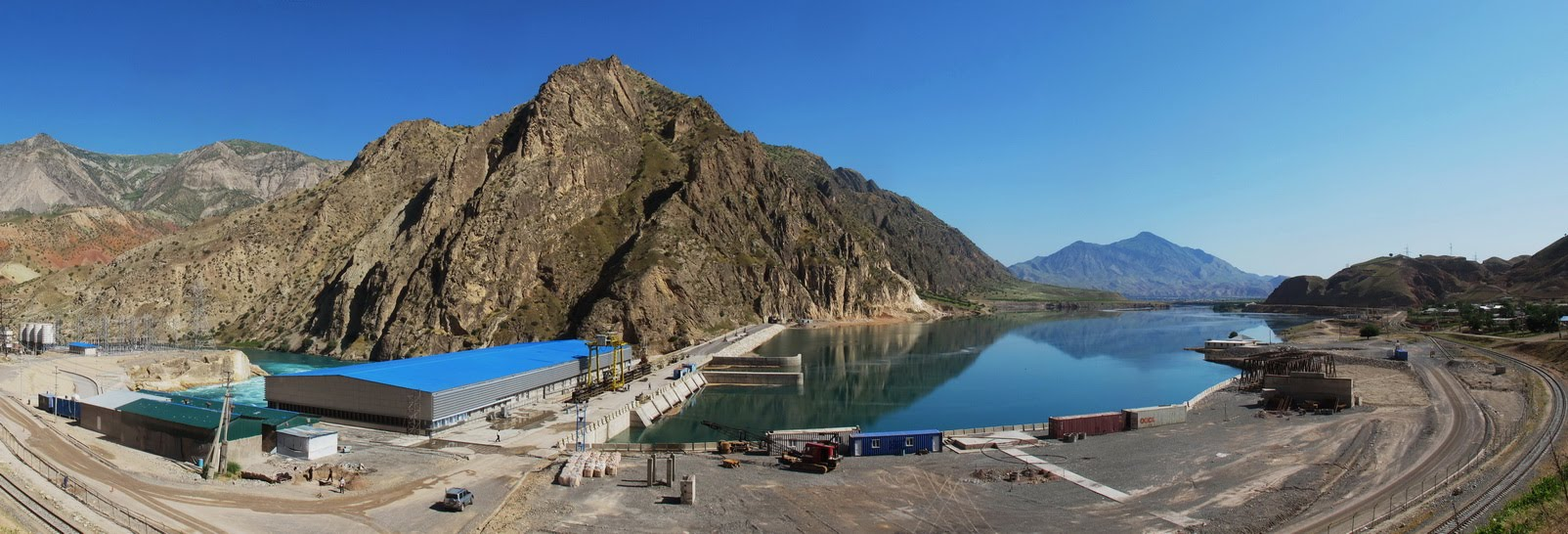

- Location within Tajikistan
- Country: Tajikistan
- Location: Danghara District, Khatlon Province
- Coordinates: 37°58′15″N 69°1′37″E
- Status: Operational
- Construction began: 20 December 2006
- Opening date: 6 September 2011
- Owner: Sangob

Dam and spillways
- Type of dam: Earth fill dam with clay core
- Impounds: Vakhsh River
- Height (thalweg): 31.5 m (103 ft)
- Length: 385 m (1,263 ft)
- Spillway type: Gated

Power Station
- Type: Run-of-river
- Turbines: 2 X 110 MW
- Installed capacity: 220 MW (max. planned)

Sangtuda 2 Hydroelectric Power Plant (Russian: Сангтудинская ГЭС-2; Tajik: Нерӯгоҳи барқи обии Сангтӯда-2) is a Tajik hydroelectric power plant on the Vakhsh River.

== History ==
Construction commenced during the Soviet period in the 1980s, but halted in the beginning of the 1990s due to lack of financing. In 1995, Iran expressed interest in helping to finish the project, but an agreement was not signed until 2005. Building work restarted on 20 December 2006.

The first unit was inaugurated on 6 September 2011 by presidents Emomalii Rahmon and Mahmoud Ahmadinejad.

== Description ==
The power plant is built and operated Iranian company Sangob. The turnkey contractor was Farab International Co. The project was consulted by Mahab Ghods Engineering Company and the subcontractor was Omran Maroon Engineers Company. It operates simultaneously with Sangtuda 1 Hydroelectric Power Plant. It uses gates of Nurek reservoir.

The dam is an earth fill dam with clay core. Its height from the river bed is 31.5 metres (103 ft) and crest length is 3,185 metres (10,449 ft).

The run-of-river type power plant consist of two units able to produce 1 TWh of electricity a year. The generating equipment is manufactured in China.

Revenues during first 12 years would be paid to Iran – and after that, ownership would be transferred to Tajikistan.
