= Irma Karakis =

Ukrainian Soviet architect (1930–2022)

Irma Yosypivna Karakis (4 November 1930 - 1 February 2022) was a Ukrainian Soviet architect, interior and furniture designer, candidate of architecture, winner of the gold medals of the Exhibition of Achievements of National Economy of the USSR.

== Early life and education ==
Irma Karakis was born on 4 November 1930 in Kyiv. Her father was Joseph Karakis (1902–1988), an architect. Her mother was Anna Karakis (née Kopman) (1904–1993).

Karakis graduated from the Kyiv Civil Engineering Institute in 1954. She wrote her thesis under the supervision of Jacob Steinberg.

In 1968, Karakis successfully defended her dissertation "Architectural and planning solutions and new types of wardrobe equipment in different school buildings" in Kyiv in 1968 at the Ukrainian Academy of Architecture.

== Career ==
From 1954 to 1957, Karakis was an architect at the Promenergoproekt Design Institute in Kyiv, and from 1957 to 1994, she was an architect and head of the interior and equipment sector at the Academy of Civil Engineering and Equipment of the Ukrainian SSR.

Karakis is the author of many construction projects, master plans for housing construction, and sets of mass-produced furniture, interiors, and equipment for schools, hotels, and restaurants. Since 1962 Karakis has been a member of the Union of Architects of Ukraine, a member of the Art and Technical Council of Ukraine since 1970, and a senior researcher (1977). Karakis is also an author of several books on interior design and numerous projects of built-in furniture.

In 2003 Karakis moved from Kyiv to New York City. She had the military rank of reserve major.

Karakis was awarded a gold medal of the ENEA of the USSR.

Irma Karakis died on 1 February 2022 in New York City.

== Selected projects ==
=== Industrial and residential buildings ===
- The thermal power plant in Tekeli (1954–56).
- The thermal power plant in Alma-Ata (1954–56).
- The thermal power plant in Chernivtsi (1958–62).
- The residential area in Chernihiv on Leo Tolstoy street.
- The thermal power plant in Berdychiv (1958–62).
- The closed unloading device of Berdychiv Cogeneration, Berdychiv (1954).
- The general plan of the residential area of Mohyliv-Podilska Cogeneration, Mogilev-Podolsky (1954)
- The main building of the Cogeneration in Mogilev-Podolsky Tekeli (Central Asia) (1954)
- The main office, fence, and checkpoint of Berdychiv plant in Berdychiv (1955)
- Reconstruction of Alma-Ata Cogeneration in Alma-Ata (1956)

=== Restaurants ===
- Restaurant "Chasing Two Hares" on Andrew's Descent in Kyiv
- Oriental Restaurant, Kyiv (1994)
- Restaurant "Hospitable Yard" - interior and bar, Kyiv (1988)
- Restaurant in the hotel "Dnipro", Kyiv

=== Hotels ===
- Interior of the furniture of the Gradetsky Hotel, Chernihiv (1979)
- Interior of the hotel "Theatrical" st. Volodymyrska, Kyiv (1979–1987)
- Interior of the “Zhytomyr Hotel”, Zhytomyr (1983)
- Interior of the hotel "Dnepropetrovsk", Dnepropetrovsk (1985)
- Interior and furniture of the hotel "Black Sea," Odessa
- Interior of “Rus Hotel”, Kyiv
- Interior of “Kyiv Hotel”, Kyiv
- Interiors and equipment of the rest house "Avangard" in Nemyriv (1982)

=== Other projects ===
Irma Karakis also designed the interiors of designer shops (such as the Jean-Paul store near the Passage in Kyiv), and the interiors of designer clothing stores (two of them on Bohdan Khmelnytsky Square in Kyiv), the interiors of private mansions (in Kozyn near Kyiv).
