= Anzob Tunnel =

Tunnel in Dushanbe-Khujand, Tajikistan

Coordinates: 39°05′16″N 68°41′34″E

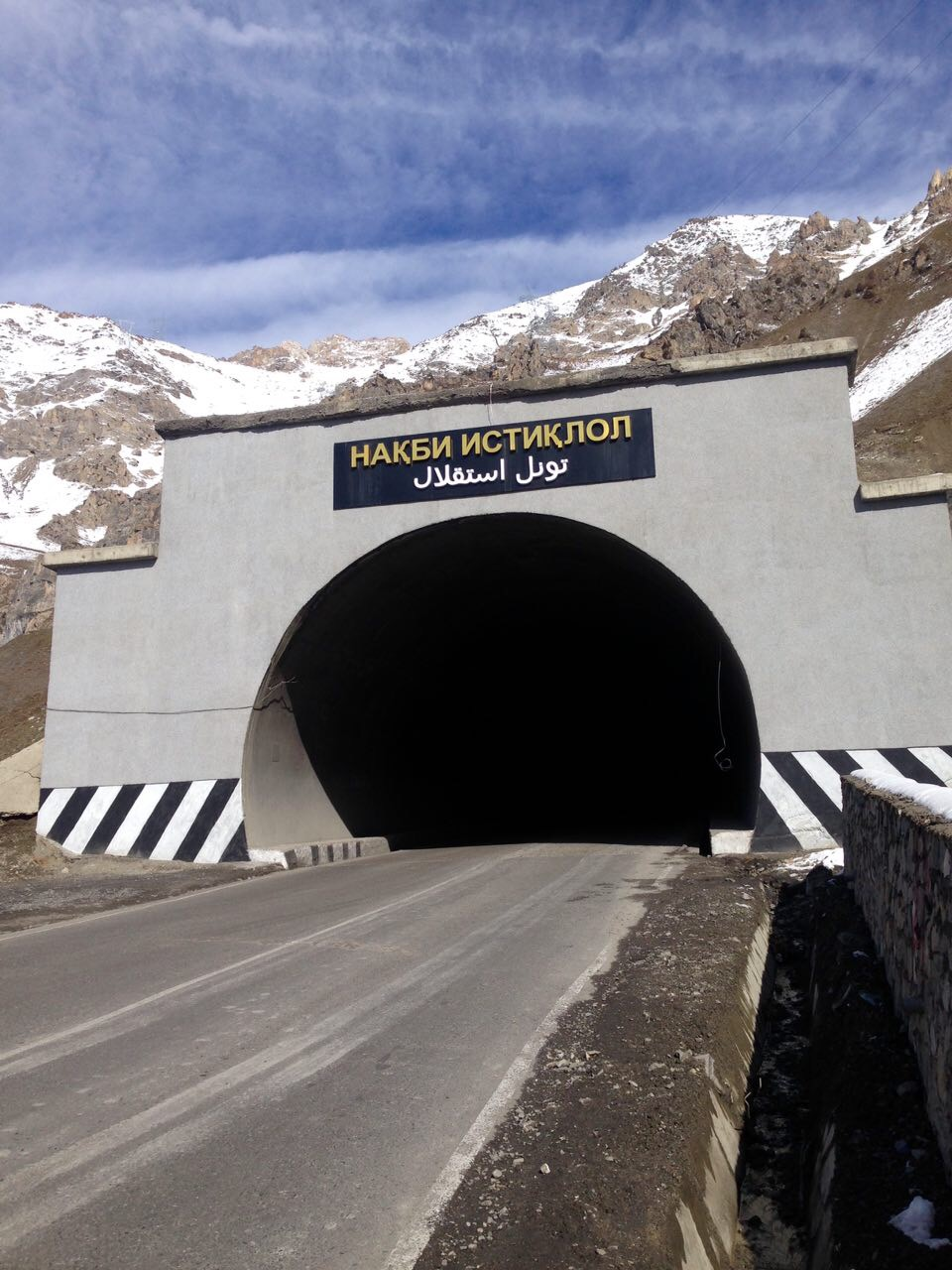
- Anzob Tunnel South Entrance, 2015
- Interactive map of Anzob Tunnel

Operation
- Opened: 1 March 2005; 21 years ago

Technical
- Length: 5,040 m (3.13 mi)
- Max elevation: 2,720 m (8,920 ft)
- Min elevation: 2,670 m (8,760 ft)

The Anzob Tunnel, Istiqlol Tunnel, or Ushtur Tunnel is a 5,040-metre-long (16,540 ft) tunnel located 80 km (50 mi) northwest of Tajikistan's capital Dushanbe, at an elevation of 2,720 m (8,920 ft). The tunnel is part of the M34 highway and connects the Tajik capital to the country's second largest city, Khujand. The tunnel was opened in 2006 despite being only partially finished and it quickly gained a reputation as being one of the world's most dangerous tunnels. In 2014 Iran's government signed an agreement to finish the tunnel and the tunnel was reopened in late 2015. The tunnel saves drivers at least 4 hours when traveling between Dushanbe and Khujand and allows travelers to avoid having to pass through Uzbekistan.

== Strategic importance ==
Tajikistan-Uzbekistan relations post-independence have been characterized as tense due to a number of factors, including concerns over incomplete border demarcation, water use disputes, and nationalist and irrendentist sentiment. Strict visa requirements and unilateral restrictions on transportation access limited cross-border trade and movement of people; this was particularly concerning for Tajikistan, as most of the country's imports pass via railway through Uzbekistan.

Prior to the tunnel's opening, the road between Dushanbe and Khujand across the Hisar Range was impassable for much of the year due to high-altitude winter conditions. The main route between the two cities, constructed during the Soviet period, passed through Uzbekistan; border closures on the Uzbek side often prevented transit of this route by Tajikistani citizens, effectively severing the connection between Tajikistan's two largest cities for nearly half of each year. The tunnel both facilitates domestic travel between Dushanbe and Khujand, and travel between Dushanbe and Tashkent on the M34 highway via Istaravshan and Gulistan.

The tunnel is also said to be part of a planned road which would run from Iran through Herat in western Afghanistan and Mazar-i-Sharif and Sherkhan Bandar in northern Afghanistan to Tajikistan and from there up to China. The route has been named the new Silk Road.

== Construction timeline ==
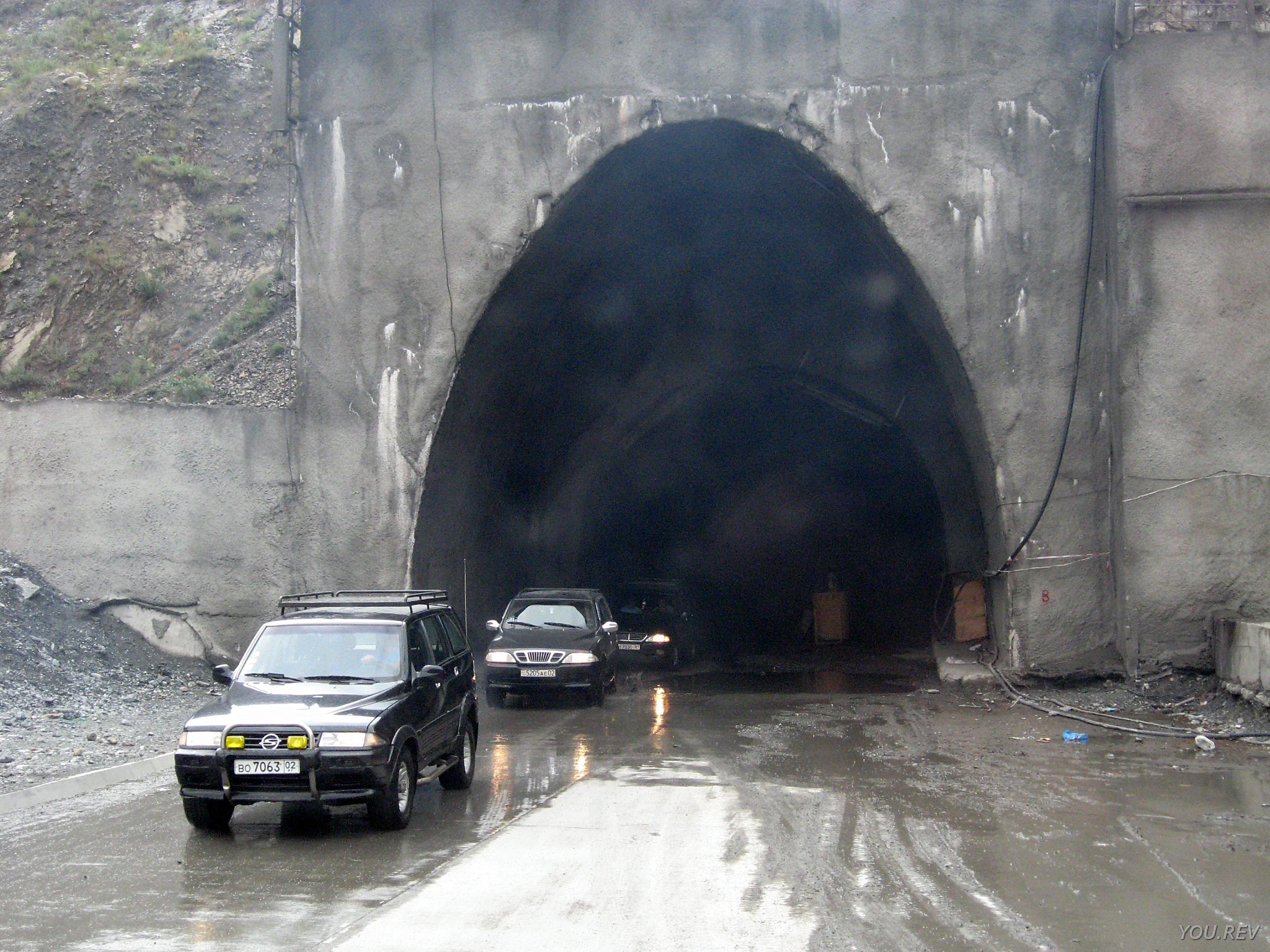
The tunnel in 2011, five years after its opening but still without pavement, ventilation or lighting.

The tunnel was officially opened in March 2006; it was built by the Iranian Sabir Co. Due to the significance of the tunnel, limited traffic flow was permitted via signing a waiver form noting potential hazards such as flooding and smog from construction equipment operating inside the tunnel prior to the final construction phase which may have included installation of ventilation and drainage infrastructure.

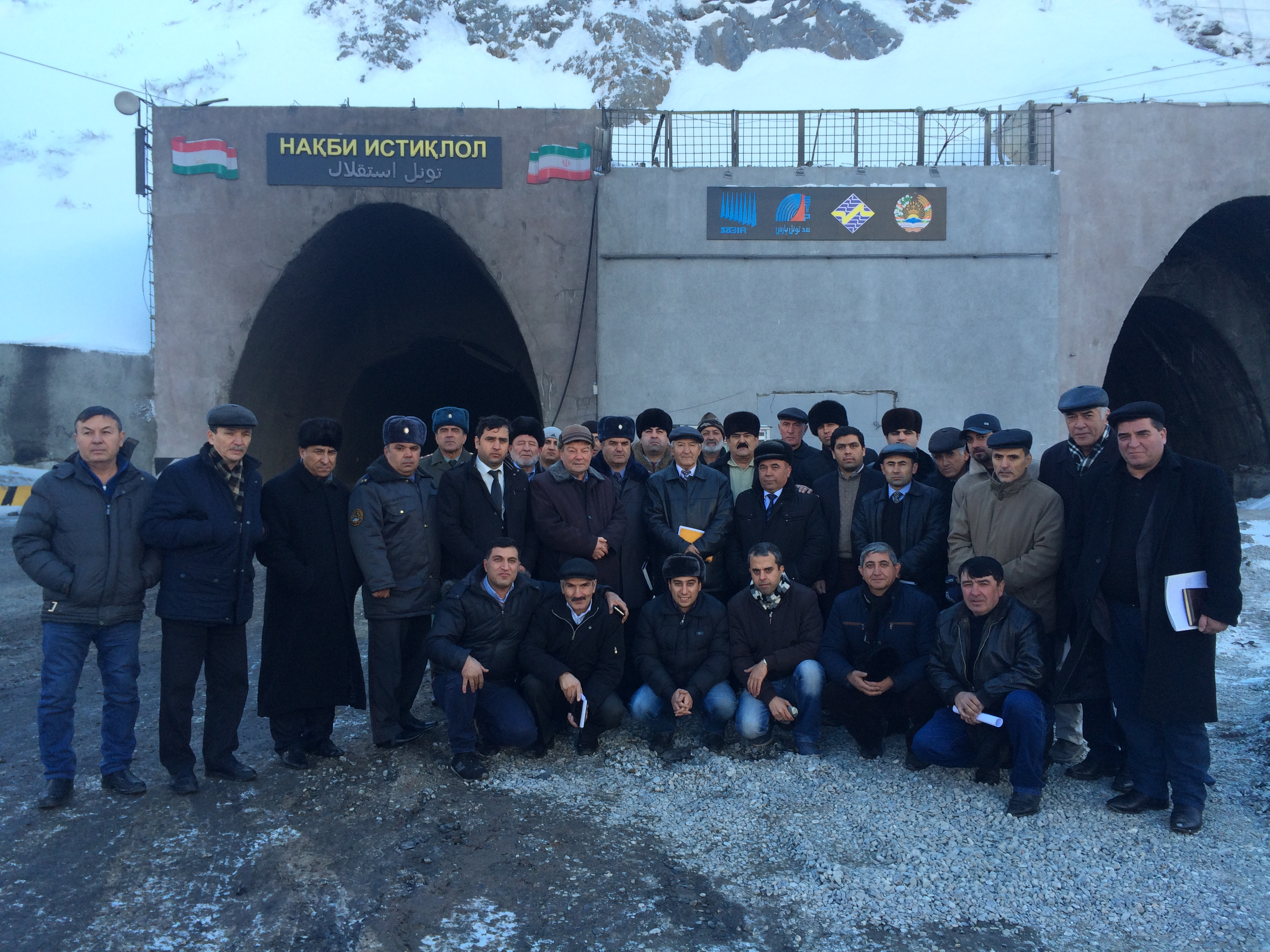
Workers pose following the tunnel's repairs and reopening

As of May 2014, the tunnel was still unfinished and the Iranian government and Tajik government had signed an agreement to complete the project by late March 2015. The tunnel was closed in June 2015 for repair work and reopened for traffic in September 2015 after leakage problems and concreting the base and lighting the tunnel was completed. It was officially inaugurated in August 2017.
