= Levakant District =

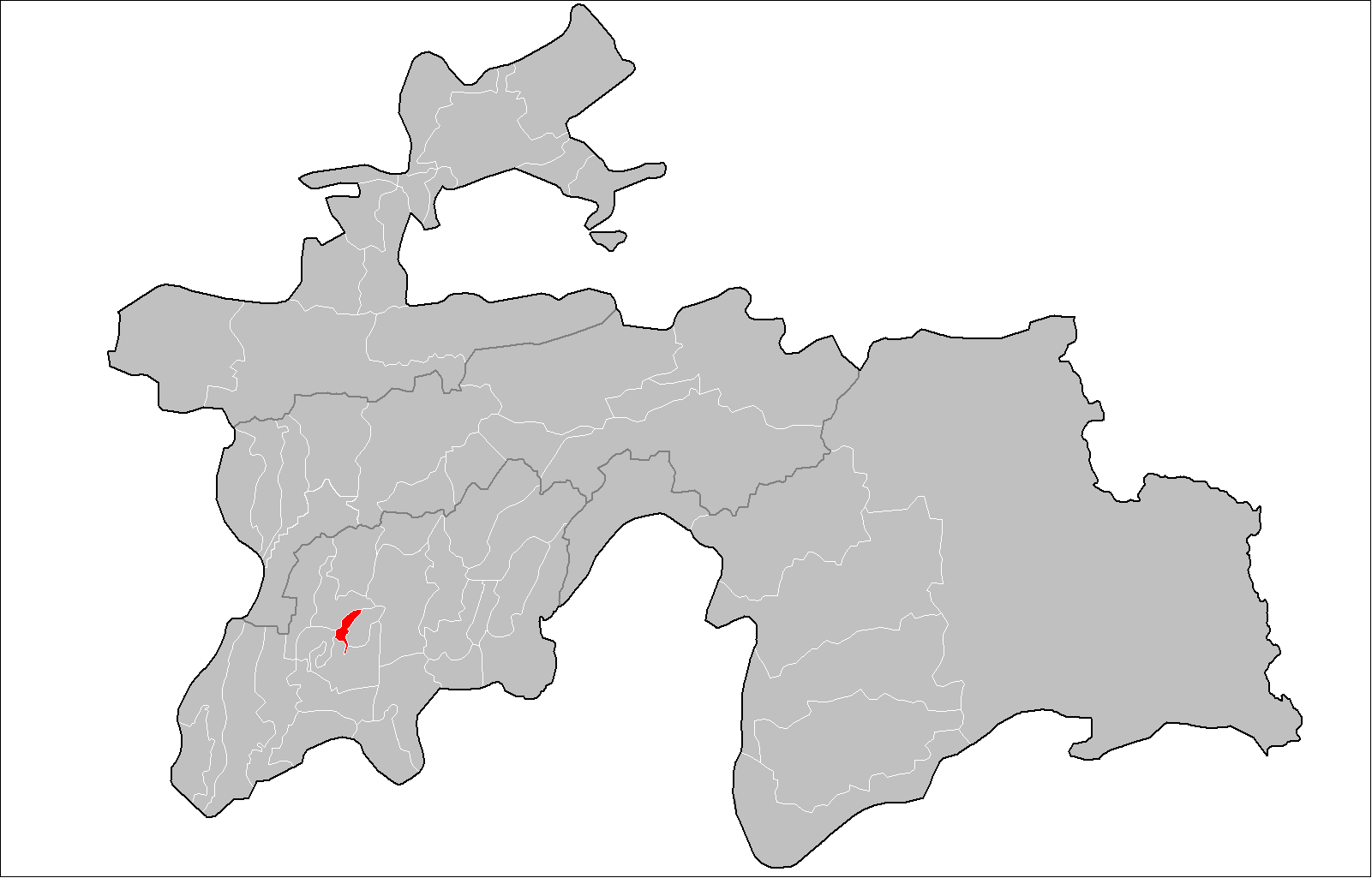
Location in Tajikistan

Sarband District or Nohiya-i Sarband (Tajik: Ноҳияи Сарбанд) is a former district in Khatlon Region, Tajikistan. Its capital was Levakant (former name: Sarband). Around 2018, it was merged into the city of Levakant.

== Administrative divisions ==
The district was divided administratively into jamoats. They were as follows (and population).

Jamoats of Sarband District
Jamoat	Population
Guliston	13757
Vahdat	4635
