= Farkhad Dam =

Dam in Spitamen, Sughd, Tajikistan

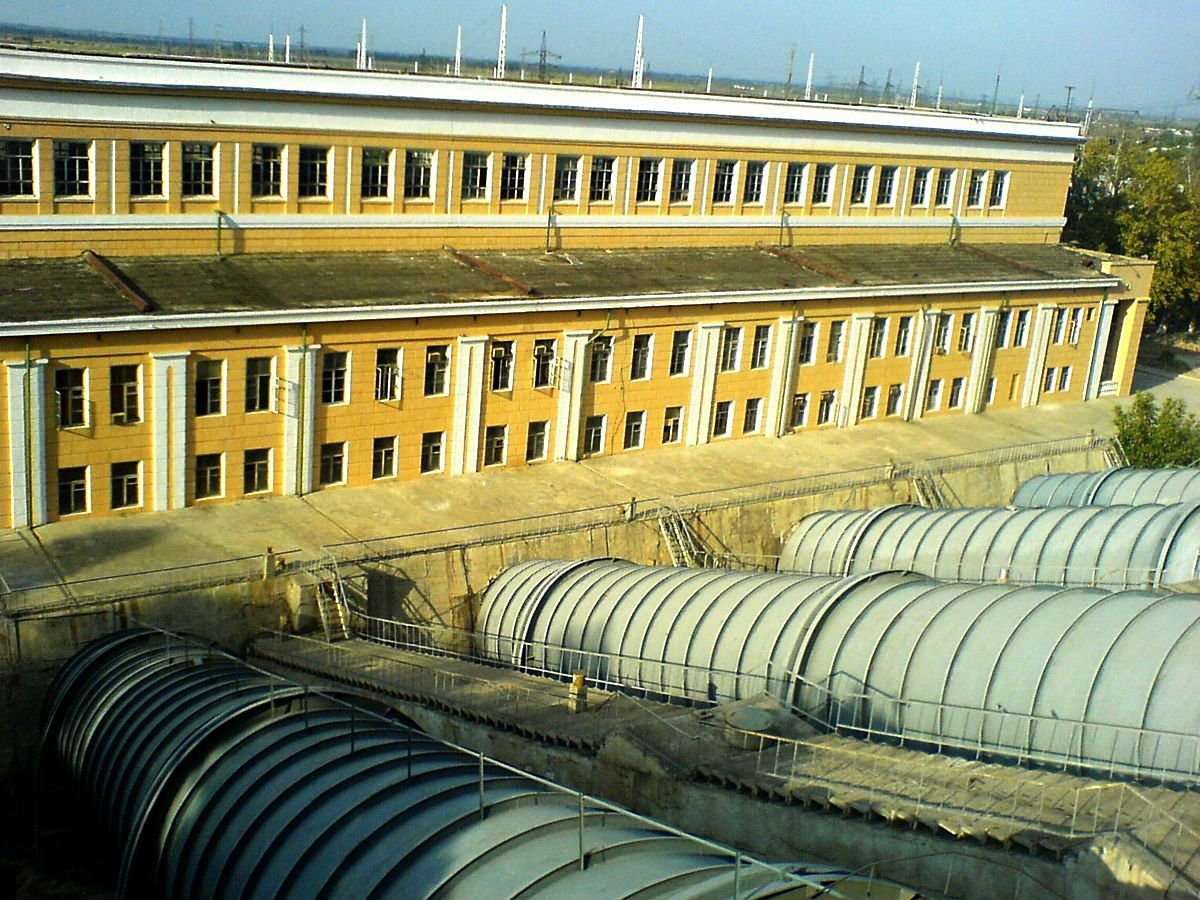

- Location within Tajikistan
- Country: Tajikistan
- Location: Spitamen, Sughd Province
- Coordinates: 40°13′19″N 69°09′41″E
- Status: Operational
- Construction began: 1942
- Opening date: 1948

Dam and spillways
- Type of dam: Concrete gravity-arch dam
- Impounds: Syr Darya
- Height: 27.5 m (90 ft)
- Length: 450 m (1,476 ft)

Reservoir
- Creates: Farkhad Reservoir
- Total capacity: 350×10^{6} m^{3} (283,750 acre⋅ft)
- Active capacity: 350
- Surface area: 48 km^{2} (19 sq mi)

Power Station
- Operator: Uzbekenergo
- Turbines: 2 X 30 MW; 2 X 33 MW; Kaplan-type
- Installed capacity: 126 MW
- Annual generation: 830 GWh

The Farkhad Dam (Russian: Фархадская ГЭС) (also known as Dam-16) is a hydroelectric and irrigation dam on the Spitamen in Sughd Province, Tajikistan. It is a part of the Naryn-Syr Darya Cascade. The dam is located on the territory of Tajikistan and controlled by Tajikistan, while the Farkhad hydropower station, operated by Uzbekenergo.

== History ==
Construction of the Farkhad Dam was initiated in 1942 during World War II. Its architect was Joseph Karakis and it was constructed by Farhadstroy. Construction works were mainly carried out by German and Japanese war prisoners. On 18 February 1948, the first generating unit was commissioned and construction was completed in 1949. In 1959, power stations two hydraulic units were upgraded.

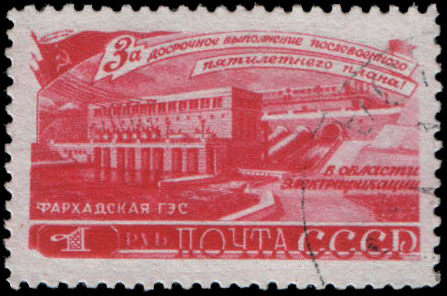
1948 Soviet stamp celebrating the Farkhad Dam

In 1933, the dam's and reservoir's territory was rented by Tajik SSR to Uzbek SSR for 40 years. However, it remained under Uzbek control until 2002 when Tajikistan took control over this as a result of а military operation.

== Description ==
The hydroelectric power station is a complex of structures located within 22 kilometres (14 mi). The length of spillway concrete dam is 120 kilometres (75 mi) and the length of earth-filled dam is 450 metres (1,480 ft). The maximum height of dams is 27.5 metres (90 ft).

The installed capacity of the power station is 126 MW and its average annual generation is 830 GWh. It consists of four Kaplan turbines: two by30 MW capacity and 2 by 33 MW capacity.

The dam creates the Farkhad Reservoir with volume of 350 million cubic metres (283,750 acre-feet). Its surface area is 48 square kilometres (19 sq mi).

== See also ==
- Kayrakkum Dam – upstream
- Shardara Dam – downstream
