= Sangtuda 1 Hydroelectric Power Plant =

Dam in Danghara District, Khatlon, Tajikistan

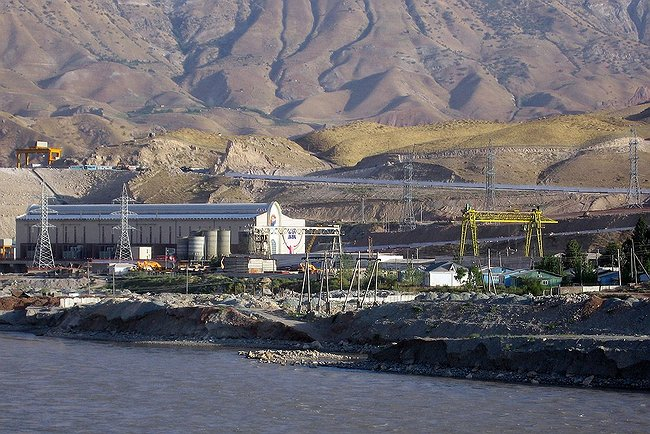
- Sangtuda 1 Hydroelectric Power Plant

- Location of the Sangtuda 1 Hydroelectric Power Plant within Tajikistan
- Official name: Sangtudinskaya GES-1
- Country: Tajikistan
- Location: Danghara District, Khatlon Province
- Coordinates: 38°02′42″N 69°03′30″E
- Status: Operational
- Construction began: 1989
- Opening date: 2009
- Construction cost: US$720 million
- Owners: Government of Russia (66.39%); Government of Tajikistan (16.45%); FGC UES (14.92%); Inter RAO UES (2.24%)

Dam and spillways
- Impounds: Vakhsh River
- Height: 75 m (246 ft)
- Length: 517 m (1,696 ft)

Reservoir
- Total capacity: 258×10^{6} m^{3} (209,000 acre⋅ft)
- Surface area: 9.75 km^{2} (3.76 sq mi)

Power Station
- Operator: Sangtudinskaya GES-1
- Type: Run-of-river
- Turbines: 4 x 167.5 MW Francis turbine by Power Machines
- Installed capacity: 670 MW
- Annual generation: 2,700 GWh
- Website www.sangtuda.com

Sangtuda 1 Hydroelectric Power Plant (Russian: Сангтудинская ГЭС-1; Tajik: Нерӯгоҳи барқи обии Сангтӯда-1) is a hydroelectric power plant, located on the Vakhsh River in Tajikistan. Construction commenced during the Soviet period in the 1980s, but halted in the beginning of the 1990s due to lack of financing when the station was about 20% complete. An agreement with Russia allowed to restart the construction, with four units entering service in 2008–2009. The plant was officially commissioned on 31 July 2009. Once working at full capacity, the plant will provide around 12% of Tajikistan's electricity output.

== History ==
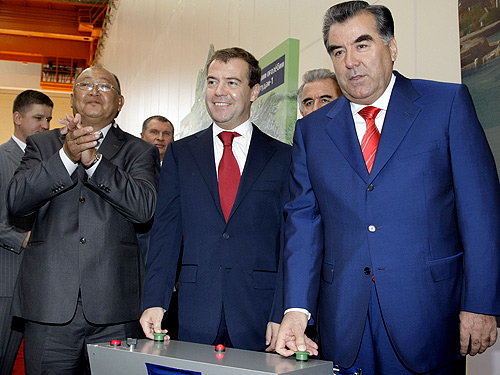
The Russian and Tajik presidents Dmitry Medvedev and Emomalii Rahmon simultaneously pushing the symbolic start buttons during the commissioning ceremony of the plant.

Plans to build the power plant were made during the 1970s, with the actual construction commencing in 1989. Dissolution of the Soviet Union, the resulting halt of financing, as well as the Civil War in Tajikistan interrupted the construction for over a decade. In 1996, the government set up a company for the construction of the power plant and issued public shares. However, the company did not start operating and was liquidated when a deal with Russia was signed.

In October 2004, an intergovernmental agreement was signed by Russia and Tajikistan to complete the project. In January 2005, Russia, Tajikistan and Iran signed a protocol according to which Russia would participate in construction of Sangtuda 1 and Iran in construction of Sangtuda 2 power plants. On 16 February 2005, a joint Russian-Tajik company Sangtudinskaya GES-1 was established. Construction resumed in April 2005.

The first unit entered service ahead of schedule on 20 January 2008 during the unusually harsh winter, with temperatures dipping below −20 °C (−4 °F), which put the Tajik energy system on the brink of collapse. The second and third units entered service on 1 July 2008, and 15 November 2008, respectively. The fourth and final unit was brought online on 15 May 2009. On 31 July 2009, the plant was officially commissioned, with the presidents of Russia and Tajikistan Dmitry Medvedev and Emomalii Rahmon participating in the event.

== Description ==
The Sangtuda 1 Hydroelectric Power Plant is located on the Vakhsh River in Khatlon region, 160 kilometres (99 mi) south of Dushanbe. It consist of four units with total capacity of 670 MW and producing 2.7 TWh electricity per year. The construction cost US$720 million. Russian government and companies has 75% of shares and Tajikistan has 25% plus one share. The power plant is operated by Sangtudinskaya GES-1, a company controlled by Inter RAO UES. Director of the company is Vladimir Belov.

As of 2010, all electricity is sold to Barqi Tojik, a national electricity company of Tajikistan. There are plans to construct a high-voltage power transmission line to Kyrgyzstan, Iran, Afghanistan, and Pakistan for the electricity export. Sangtuda—Puli Khumri 220 kV transmission line to Afghanistan was scheduled to be completed in 2010.

== Significance ==
Launching of the plant is a significant milestone in achieving energy independence for Tajikistan, as the country had experienced severe energy shortages ever since it acquired independence. Tajikistan has experienced a severe shortage of electricity during the winter months for the past fifteen years. In the summer time, Tajikistan exports its electricity surplus to surrounding countries, and in the winter time Tajikistan experiences rolling blackouts. The plant provides around 12% of Tajikistan's electricity output.

The plant is the largest project within the Commonwealth of Independent States with participation of the Russian companies, including Power Machines, Chekhov Gidrostal Plant, ChirkeyGESstroy, Zarubezhvodstroy, Zagranenergostroymontazh, and Trust Gidromontazh. Both the Tajik and the Russian presidents have noted that the project has contributed significantly to strengthening the relations between the two countries.

== Controversies ==
In 1996, public shares of the company for the construction of the power plant were issued. After dissolving this company it remained unclear how the owners of shares are to be compensated. Some of Tajikistan's neighbours, especially Uzbekistan, are concerned that construction of large hydroelectric plants within the headwaters of the region's rivers will result in shortages of water downstream.

Uzbekistan, Kazakhstan and Turkmenistan are concerned that the filling of the power plant's reservoir and the actual operation of the power plant will harm the water needed for their crop production.

Withdrawal of Uzbekistan from the Central Asian unified power system also cut Tajikistan off from the system and blocked electricity export via Uzbek to southern Kazakhstan. Because of this, the plant can't utilize its full capacity. Rail traffic blockade by Uzbekistan had delayed construction of transmission lines from the plant to Afghanistan and Kyrgyzstan.
