= Nurek Dam =

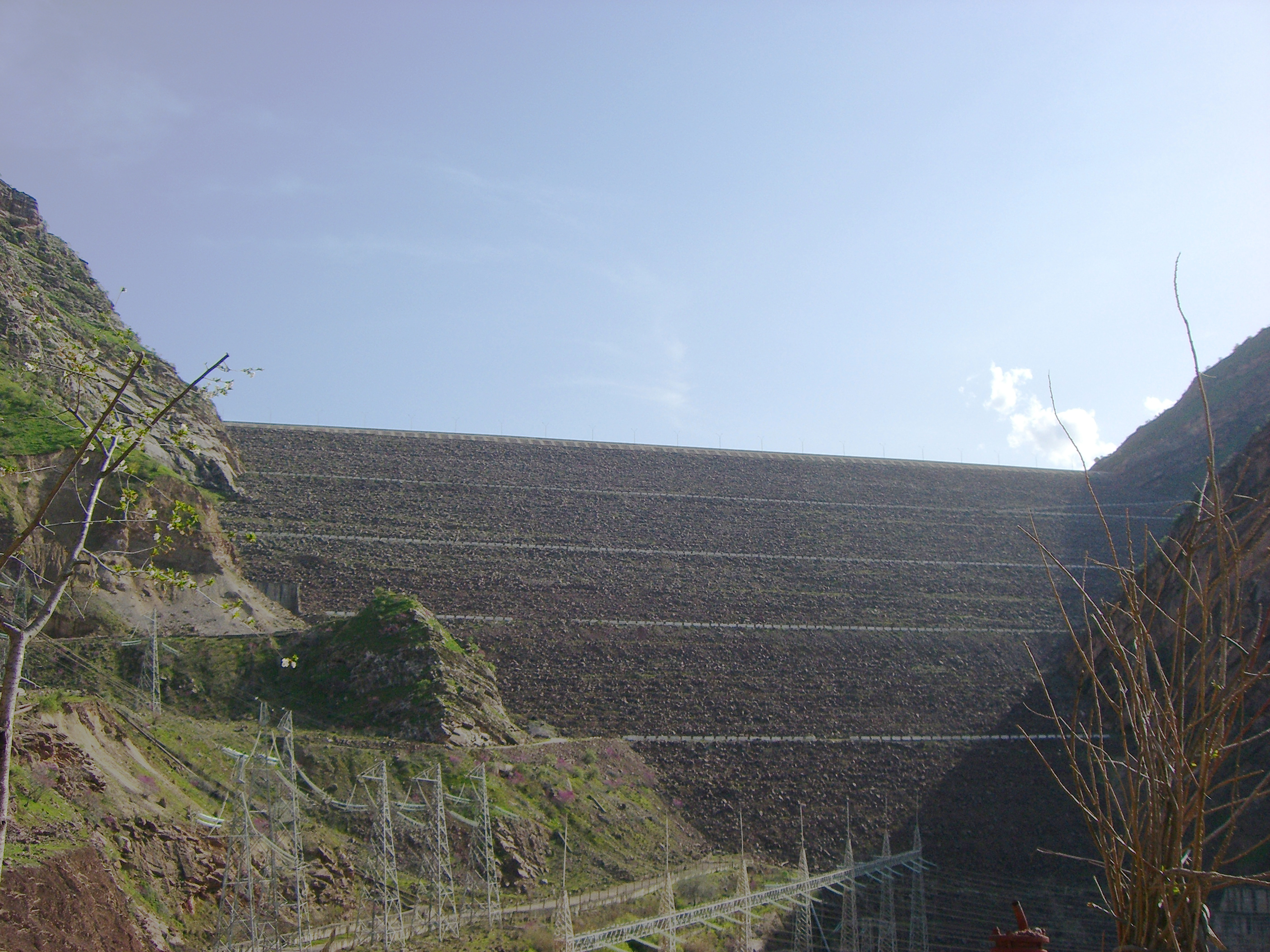

- Location of Nurek Dam within Tajikistan
- Location: Nurek, Border of Khatlon district and Districts of Republican Subordination, Tajikistan
- Coordinates: 38°22′18″N 69°20′53″E
- Purpose: Power
- Status: Operational
- Construction began: 1961
- Opening date: 1972-1980
- Owner: Barqi Tojik

Dam and spillways
- Impounds: Vakhsh River
- Height: 300 m (980 ft)
- Length: 700 m (2,300 ft)

Reservoir
- Creates: Nurek reservoir
- Total capacity: 10.5 km^{3} (8,500,000 acre⋅ft)
- Surface area: 98 km^{2} (38 sq mi)

Power Station
- Operator: Barqi Tojik
- Commission date: Initial: 1972–1979; Reconstruction: 1988
- Type: Conventional
- Turbines: 9 x 335 MW Francis-type
- Installed capacity: 3015 MW

The Nurek Dam (Russian: Нурекская ГЭС; Tajik: Нерӯгоҳи обии Норак, Nerūgohi obii Norak, Tajik for Nurek Hydro-electric Station) is an earth-fill embankment dam on the Vakhsh River in Tajikistan. Its primary purpose is hydroelectric power generation and its power station has an installed capacity of 3,015 MW. Construction of the dam began in 1961 and the power station's first generator was commissioned in 1972. The last generator was commissioned in 1979 and the entire project was completed in 1980 when Tajikistan was still a republic within the Soviet Union, becoming the tallest dam in the world at the time. At 304 m (997 ft), it is currently the second tallest man-made dam in the world, after being surpassed by Jinping-I Dam in 2013. The Rogun Dam, also along the Vakhsh in Tajikistan, may exceed both in size when completed.

== Construction ==
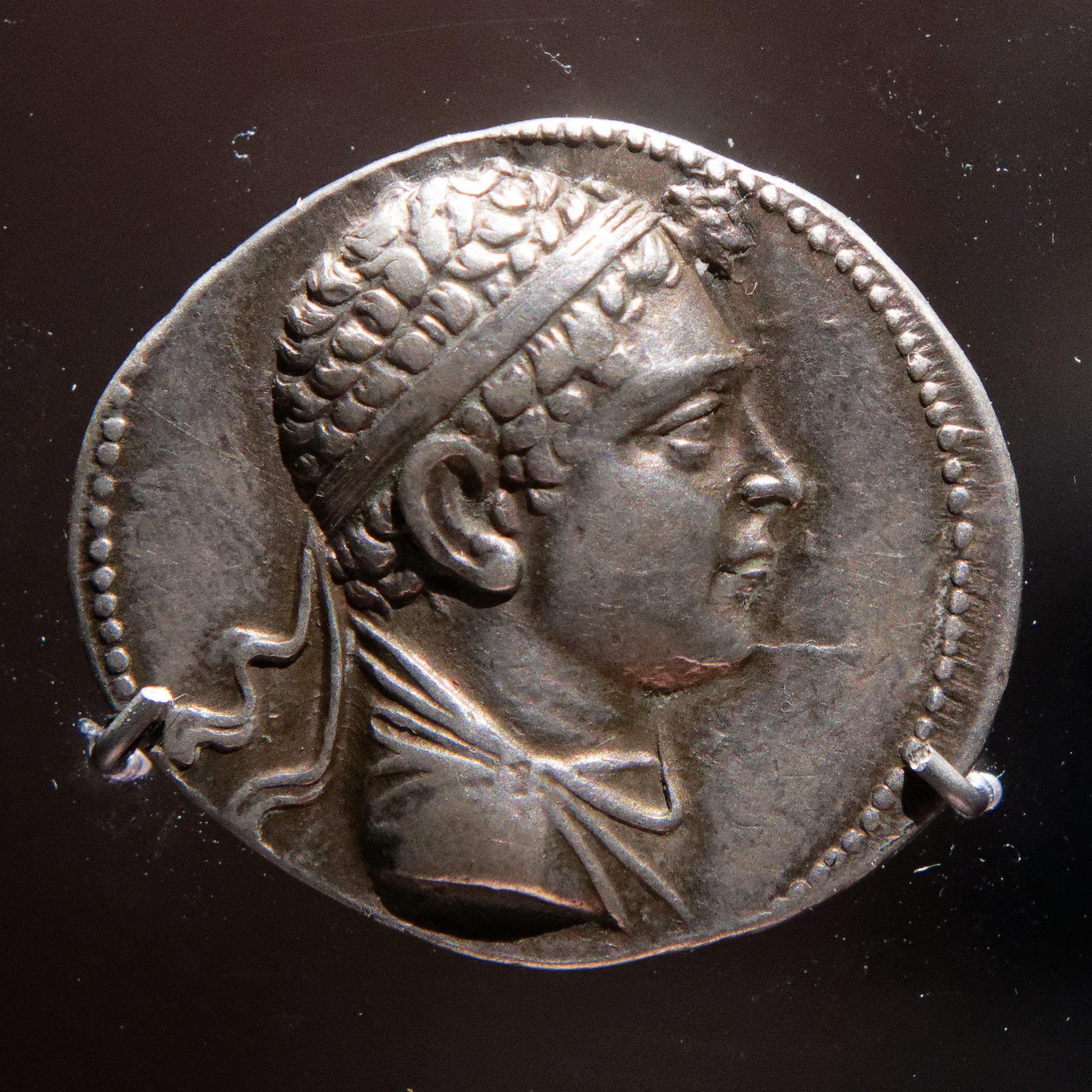
Tetradrachm of Euthydemus II (185–180 BC), found on the banks of the Nurek Reservoir.

The Nurek Dam was constructed by the Soviet Union between the years 1961 and 1980. It is uniquely constructed, with a central core of cement forming an impermeable barrier within a 300 m (980 ft)-high rock and earth fill construction. The volume of the mound is 54 million m^{3}. The dam includes nine hydroelectric generating units, the first commissioned in 1972 and the last in 1979. An estimated 5,000 people were resettled from the dam's flooding area.

The dam is located in a deep gorge along the Vakhsh River in western Tajikistan, about 75 km (47 mi) east of the nation's capital of Dushanbe. A town near the dam, also called Nurek, houses engineers and other workers employed at the dam's power plant.

== Electricity generation ==
A total of nine Francis turbine-generators are installed in the Nurek Dam's power station. Originally having a generating capacity of 300 MW each (2,700 MW total), they were redesigned and retrofitted between 1984 and 1988 so now have a capacity of 335 MW each (3,015 MW total). As of 1994, this formed most of the nation's 4.0 gigawatt hydroelectric generating capacity, which was adequate to meet 98% of the nation's electricity needs. As of early 2024, it supplies 70% of Tajikistan's electricity.

== Reservoir ==
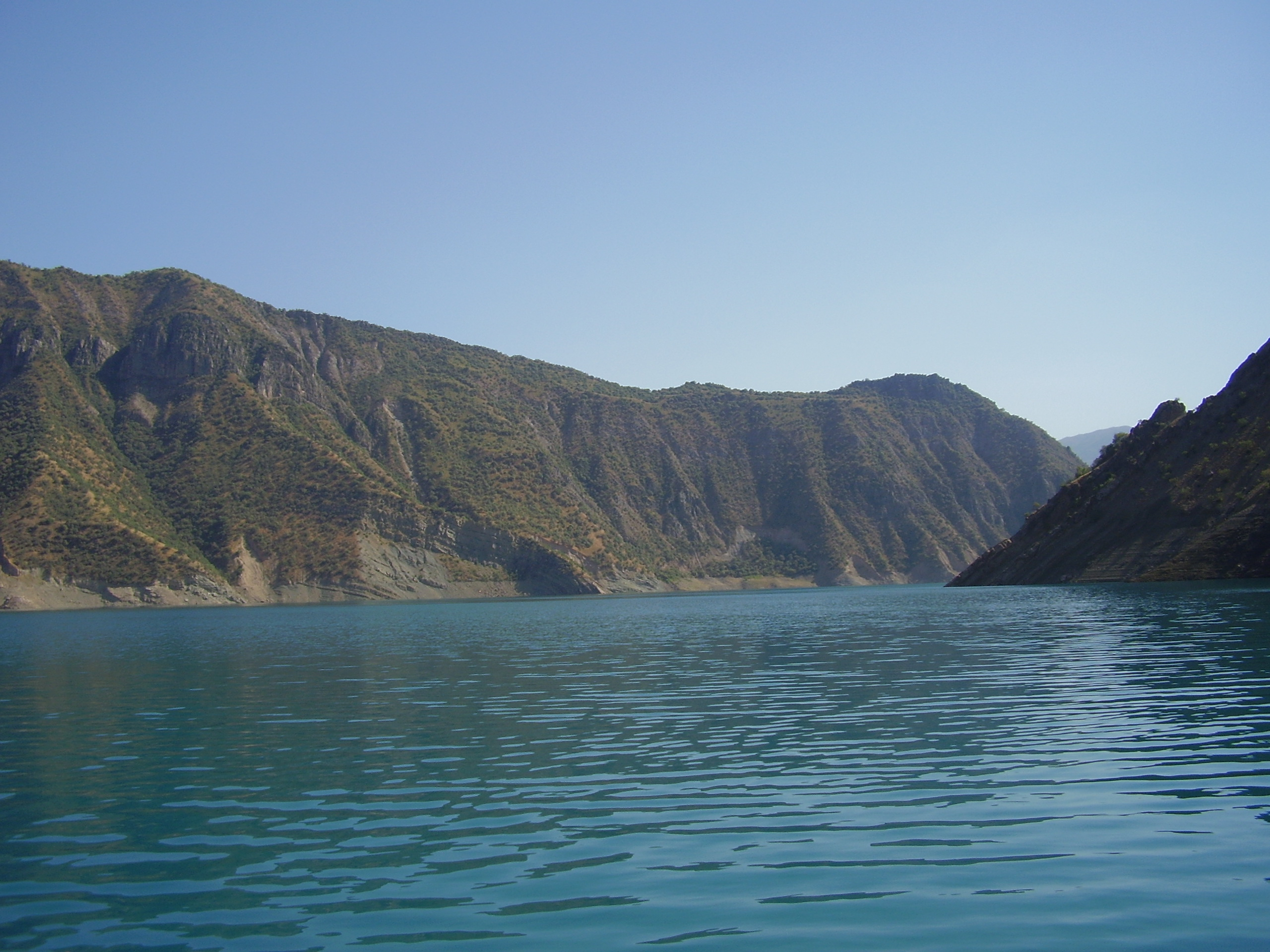
Nurek reservoir

The reservoir formed by the Nurek Dam, known simply as Nurek, is the largest reservoir in Tajikistan with a capacity of 10.5 km^{3}. The reservoir is over 70 km (40 mi) in length, and has a surface area of 98 km^{2} (38 sq mi). The reservoir drives the hydroelectric plant located within the dam. Stored water is also used for irrigation of agricultural land. Irrigation water is transported 14 kilometers through the Dangara irrigation tunnel and is used to irrigate about 700 km^{2} (300 sq mi) of farmland. It is suspected that the reservoir may have caused induced seismicity when being impounded.
