= Vakhsh (river) =

Central Asian river in Kyrgyzstan and Tajikistan, part of the Amu Darya drainage basin

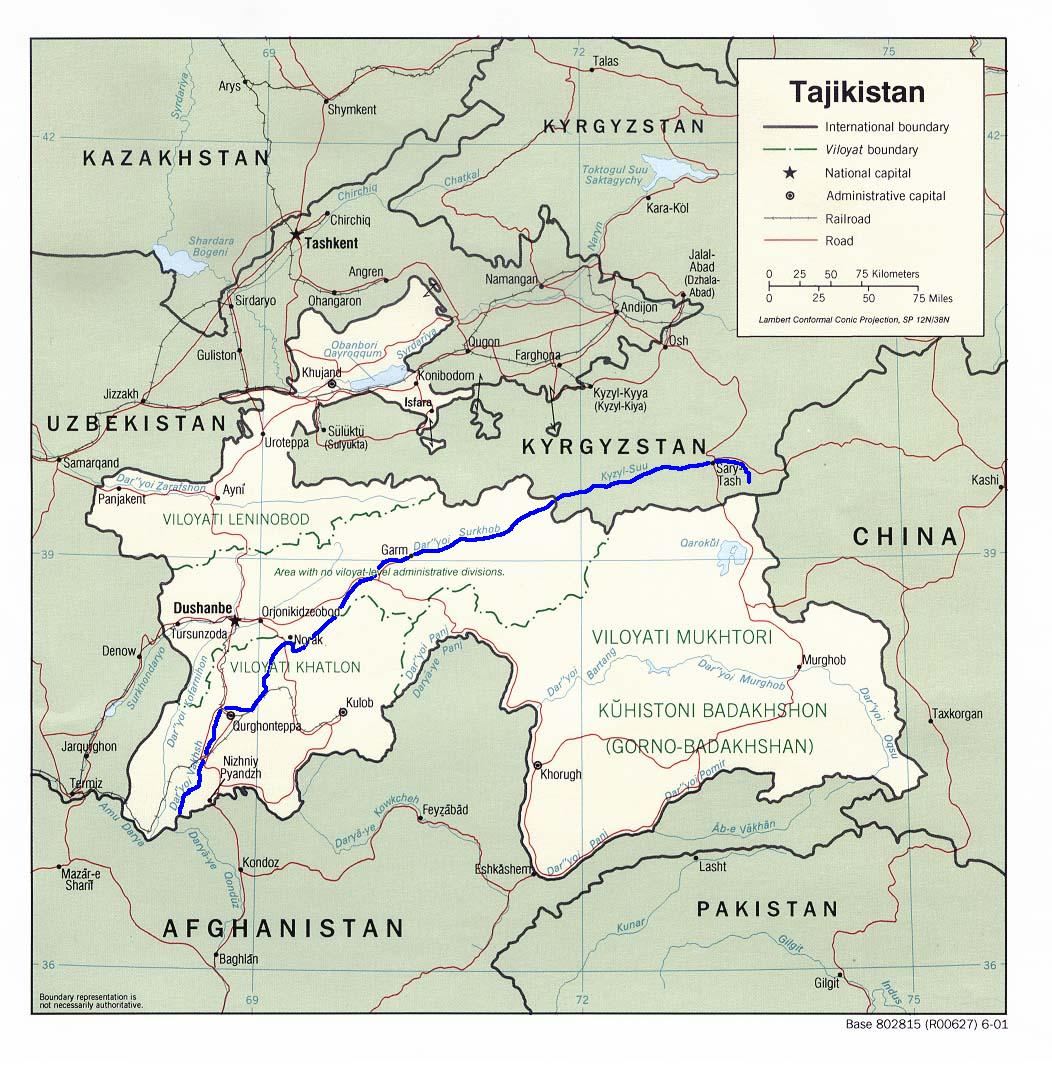
- The river Vakhsh (highlighted in blue)

Location
- Country: Kyrgyzstan, Tajikistan

Physical characteristics
- Mouth: Amu Darya
  - coordinates: 37°06′40″N 68°18′51″E
- Length: 786 km (488 mi)
- Basin size: 39,100 km^{2} (15,100 sq mi)
- Discharge
  - average: 621 m^{3}/s (21,900 cu ft/s)

Basin features
- Progression: Amu Darya→ Aral Sea

French language map, centred on eastern Tajikistan, showing the Vakhsh, its tributaries and its eventual confluence with the Amu Darya (‘Vakhch/Surkhob/Kyzylsu’ capitalised in blue top left)

The Vakhsh (/ˈvækʃ/ VAKSH; Tajik and Russian: Вахш), also known as the Surkhob (Tajik: Сурхоб) in north-central Tajikistan and as the Kyzyl-Suu (Kyrgyz: Кызыл-Суу) in Kyrgyzstan, is a Central Asian river and one of the main rivers of Tajikistan. It is a tributary of the Amu Darya river.

== Geography ==
The Vakhsh flows through the Pamirs, passing through very mountainous territory that frequently restricts its flow to narrow channels within deep gorges. Some of the largest glaciers in Tajikistan, including the Fedchenko and Abramov glaciers (the former being the longest glacier in the world outside of the polar regions), drain into the Vakhsh. Its largest tributaries are the Muksu and the Obikhingou; the Vakhsh proper begins at the confluence of the Obikhingou and Surkhob rivers.

After it exits the Pamirs, the Vakhsh passes through the fertile lowlands of southwest Tajikistan. It ends when it flows into the Panj to form the Amu Darya, at the border of Tajikistan and Afghanistan. The Tigrovaya Balka Nature Reserve, which was the last habitat of the now-extinct Caspian tiger in the former USSR, is located at the confluence of the Vakhsh and the Panj.

The catchment area of the Vakhsh is 39,100 km^{2}, of which 31,200 km^{2} (79.8%) lies within Tajikistan. The river contributes about 25% of the total flow of the Amu Darya, its parent river. Its average discharge is 538 m^{3}/s, with an annual discharge of 20.0 km^{3}. However, since the Vakhsh is fed mostly by melting snow and glaciers, these flow rates have great seasonal variability between winter and summer. Measurements at the Nurek Dam indicate that winter flow rates average around 150 m^{3}/s, whereas flow rates during the summer months can exceed 1500 m^{3}/s – a tenfold increase.

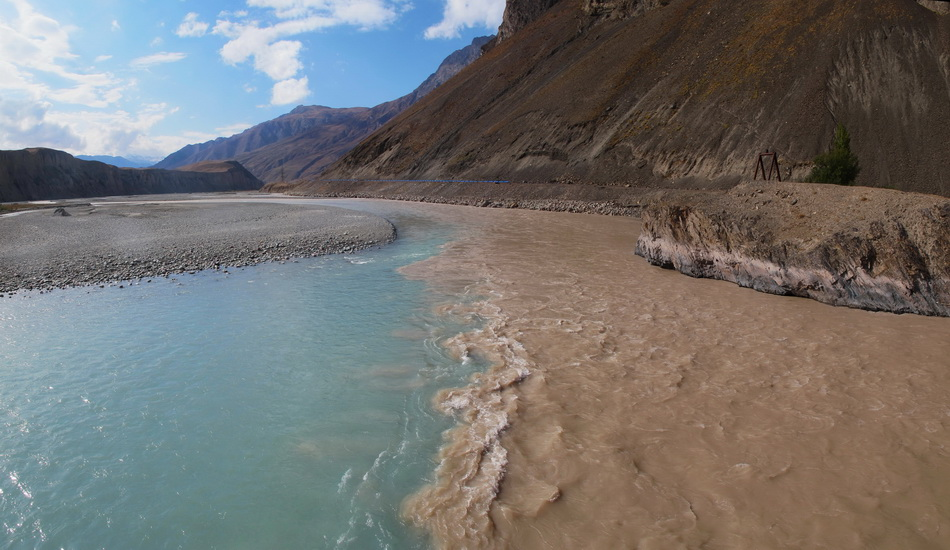
Beginning of the Surkhob proper at the confluence of the Muk-Suu and the (upper) Kyzyl-Suu rivers

== Economic development ==
Nurek Reservoir
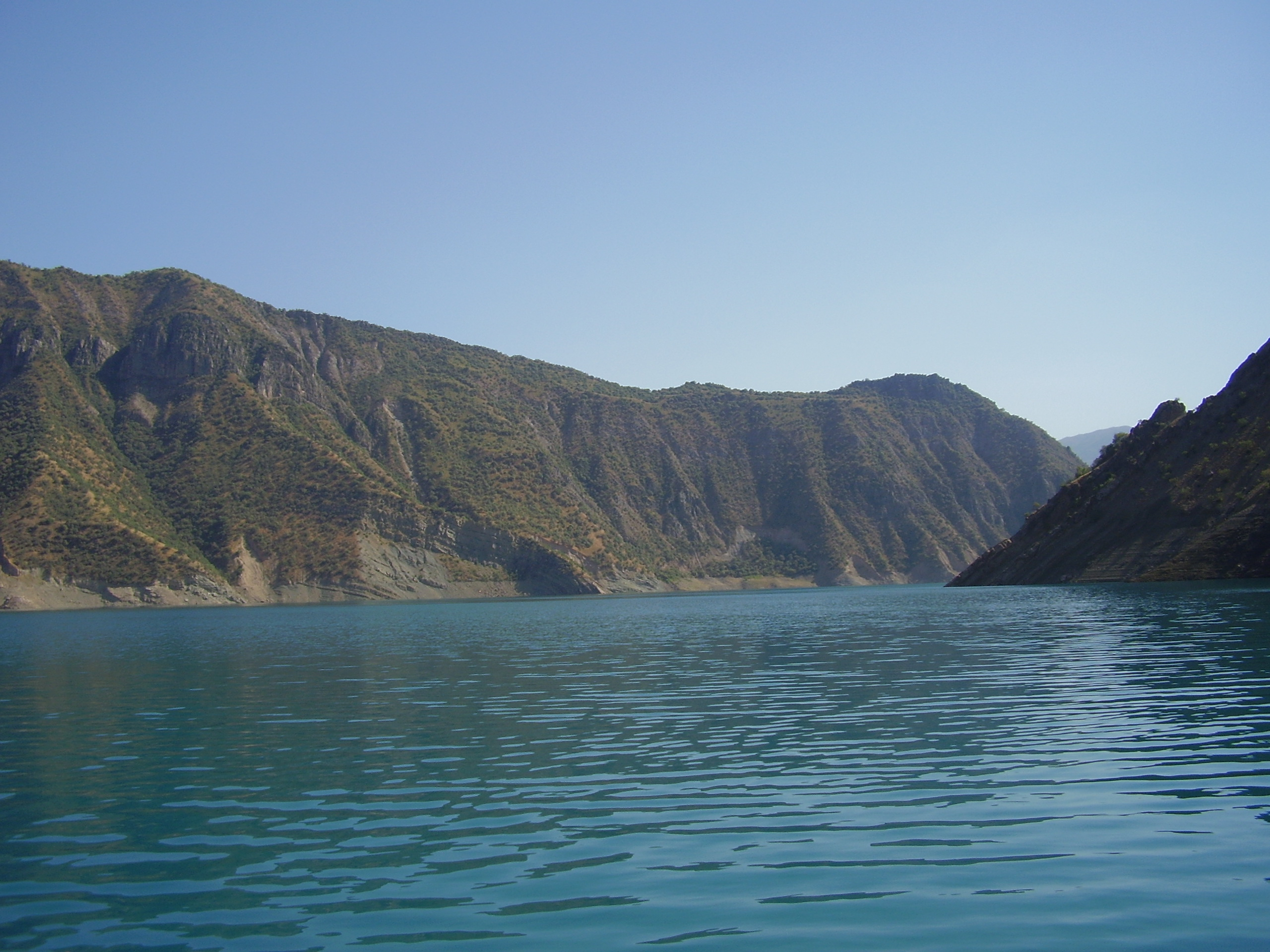
- The Vakhsh River forms a reservoir behind the Nurek dam

- Location within Tajikistan
- Coordinates: 38°19′40″N 69°23′00″E

The Vakhsh has been intensively developed for human use. Electricity, aluminum, and cotton are the mainstays of Tajikistan's economy, and the Vakhsh is involved with all three of these sectors. Hydroelectricity provides 91% of the country's electricity as of 2005, and 90% of that total comes from the five completed dams along the Vakhsh, dominated by the world's second tallest dam, the Nurek. The other four dams, downstream of Nurek, are Baipaza, Sangtuda 1, Sangtuda 2 and Golovnaya Dams. (These dams make Tajikistan the highest hydroelectric power producer per capita in the world.) Hydroelectricity powers the aluminum production at the Tajik Aluminum Company in Tursunzoda, a major source of Tajikistan's industrial output and export revenue. As for cotton, Vakhsh water irrigates much of Tajikistan's crop; about 85% of the water taken from the Vakhsh goes toward irrigation.

=== Soviet era ===
The leaders of the Soviet Union stressed the importance of developing the country's under-developed regions, such as the Tajik Soviet Socialist Republic (which was the predecessor to modern-day, independent Tajikistan). Not only did Vladimir Lenin’s ideology identify the decentralization of industry as a way to counter the colonial exploitation of indigenous peoples, but the USSR had strategic aims as well, especially in World War II when industry was evacuated eastward away from the German front. This industrialization would be fueled by exploiting Tajikistan's enormous hydropower potential.

It took until the 1950s, however, for dam construction to begin on the Vakhsh. The Perepadnaya power station, was the first to be commissioned in 1959. It is situated on a canal off the Golovnaya Dam which was commissioned in 1963. The giant Nurek dam was constructed between 1961 and 1980. Baipaza Dam was completed in 1983.

To build transmission lines over the Pamirs would have been prohibitively expensive, so, in order to take advantage of the electricity produced by these dams, the Soviet Union built many industries nearby. The Tajik Aluminum Company plant is a prime example. Other industries established locally were chemical plants, nitrogen fertilizer factories, and cotton gins.

The dams, particularly the reservoirs behind them, were also built with the purpose of providing water for agriculture. The Soviet Union promoted cotton farming in the Vakhsh Valley, as well as vineyards and orchards, and drew water from the Vakhsh for irrigation. The Vakhsh Valley Canal Project, which expanded farmland along the river's lower reaches, predated the dams, having been completed in 1933. In the 1960s, after the reservoirs had been constructed, engineers dug tunnels through the surrounding mountains to irrigate other valleys. Water storage in the reservoirs also helped control the river's flow, so as to provide a more reliable water supply for downstream users in Uzbekistan and Turkmenistan.

=== After Tajik independence ===
Soviet Central Asia had a centrally planned economy in which the different republics supplied resources to each other at different times of the year. During the summer, when river flows were greatest, Tajikistan (located upstream) released water from its reservoirs on the Vakhsh and exported the hydroelectricity to power irrigation pumps downstream, in Uzbekistan and Turkmenistan, along the Amu Darya. In winter, Tajik dams accumulated water, and the fossil-fuel-rich downstream nations supplied Tajikistan with oil and gas to compensate for forgone hydroelectricity generation.

However, with increasing regional tension post-independence, this system is breaking down, with no conclusive cooperative arrangement yet. Fuel deliveries from downstream nations have been getting less reliable and more expensive, and impoverished Tajikistan cannot adapt by increasing winter hydroelectric generation since this would jeopardize irrigation and electricity exports in the summer. This dependence has caused energy crises in the winters of 2008 and 2009, in which the capital, Dushanbe, lost power and heating. Heightened nationalism and border disputes further complicate the search for a solution to Central Asia's water needs, according to a study conducted by the International Crisis Group.

Tajikistan is therefore pursuing a course of action to increase hydroelectric capacity by building more dams on the Vakhsh, in order to promote economic growth and move towards energy independence. Another four dams are planned or under construction, including the Rogun Dam. The Rogun Dam began construction in Soviet times but remains uncompleted; now Tajikistan has recommenced the project with financial support from the Russian Aluminum Company. If constructed to its full planned height, it will supersede the Nurek as tallest in the world.

This project has caused great controversy. Just as energy dependence threatens Tajikistan, so water dependence threatens the downstream nations. For this reason, Uzbekistan was highly critical of the Rogun Dam, claiming that it would “put it [Tajikistan] firmly in control of the river”. The World Bank responded to these tensions by launching investigations into the social and environmental impacts of the dam. However, following the death of its former leader Islam Karimov in 2016, in 2018 Uzbekistan dropped its opposition to the Rogun Dam. "Go ahead and build it, but we hold to certain guarantees in accordance with these conventions that have been signed by you," Uzbek Foreign Minister Abdulaziz Komilov said in a televised appearance on July 5, 2018.

== Environmental problems ==
Intensive agriculture in the Vakhsh basin has left the river polluted with fertilizers, pesticides, and salts. Also, chemicals have leached into groundwater from the heavy industries near the Vakhsh's dams, which has in turn contaminated surface water. However, ever since Tajikistan lost their Soviet agricultural subsidies with the breakup of the Soviet Union, farms have not been able to afford as many fertilizers or pesticides as before, thus decreasing levels of pollution in the river. The 2008 financial crisis has further increased poverty, which in turn has further decreased pollution.

Since the waters of the Vakhsh eventually flow into the Aral Sea, pollution in the Vakhsh contributes to eutrophication there.

=== Climate change impacts ===
The Vakhsh is fed by the glaciers of the Pamirs, one of the world's most susceptible regions to climate change. Tajikistan as a whole has experienced a rise in temperatures from between 1.0-1.2 degrees Celsius between 1940 and 2000, and many glaciers that feed the Vakhsh have retreated, including the Fedchenko, which is melting at a rate of 16–20 meters/year. According to Oxfam International, up to 30% of Tajikistan's glaciers could shrink or disappear completely by 2050. The reduction in river flow could lower the Vakhsh's hydropower production, and harm agriculture dependent on its waters for irrigation. Furthermore, if climate change affects precipitation patterns, it could cause more floods, landslides, and other natural disasters in the river valley.

== Blockages ==
The Vakhsh is located in a seismically active region, and earthquakes, in addition to high groundwater levels (especially during the wet season), cause hundreds of landslides per year. These landslides occasionally block the river and form landslide dams.

Such blockages pose a significant threat to the river's dams and hydroelectric power generation. A large landslide 8 kilometers (5 mi) downstream from the Baipaza Dam has blocked the river twice (in 1992 and 2002) ever since this dam opened in 1985. Both blockages were immediately blasted to clear the river channel, since they threatened to raise the water level high enough to flood the dam. Such an event could potentially have serious economic consequences by disrupting power generation, stopping production at the Tajik Aluminum Company, and cutting off supplies of drinking and irrigation water for downstream users. In the worst-case scenario, failure of a landslide dam could cause catastrophic floods.

Recognizing these threats, the Asian Development Bank responded to the landslide of 2002 by granting the government of Tajikistan a low-interest loan to stabilize the valley slopes and mitigate the potential for blockages in the future.
