= Barqi Tojik =

National integrated power company of Tajikistan

- Company type: State owned
- Industry: energy
- Headquarters: Dushanbe, Tajikistan
- Area served: Tajikistan
- Key people: Rustam Rahmatzoda (Chairman)
- Products: electricity
- Services: electricity transmission and distribution
- Owner: Government of Tajikistan

Barqi Tojik is a national integrated power company of Tajikistan. The chairman of the company is Rustam Rahmatzoda.

Barqi Tojik operates the Nurek Hydroelectric Power Plant, the largest station in Central Asia with an installed generation capacity of 3 gigawatts (GW) and produces over 75% of Tajikistan's electricity.
