= Abdul Mejid (explorer) =

Abdul Mejid (fl. 1860) was a Kabuli mullah and merchant who explored Central Asia (then frequently known as Tartary) on behalf of the British Empire.

== Name ==
Abdul Mejid's name has been various transcribed as Abdul Mejid, Abdul Mejíd, Abdul Medjid, Abdul-Medjid, Abdoul Medjid, and Abdool Mujeed.

== Life ==
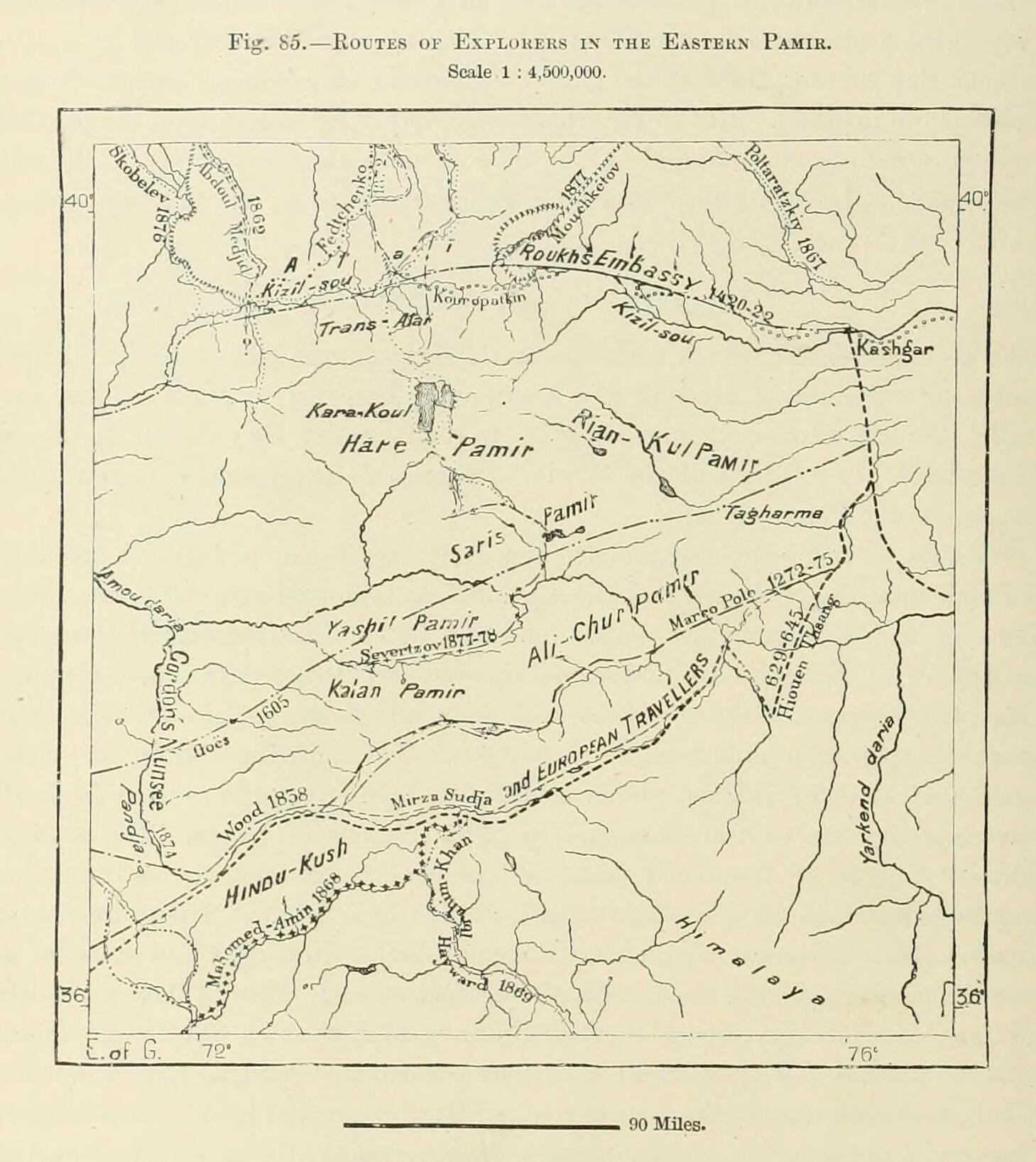
Abdul Mejid's route across the Hindu Kush, Pamir, Transalai, and Alai Mountains (dotted line), alongside those of other early explorers in the region.

Abdul Mejid was raised in Kabul, Afghanistan. His father was an imam and he himself became learned enough in Islam and Islamic law to be considered a mullah. After finding employment in the emirate's mint, he became a merchant and married the daughter of the still more prosperous freedman Nazir Khairulla Khan. (Note: Variously also written Nasir Khayr Ullah, Nasir Khan, Nazir Khyroola, and Nazir Khairoullah.) Abdul Mejid travelled throughout Central Asia, then frequently known as Tartary. The area has extremely difficult terrain and was known at the time for its violent hostility to outsiders, including Britain's disastrous retreat from Kabul during the First Anglo-Afghan War and the subsequent execution of the British agents Charles Stoddart and Arthur Conolly by the emir of Bukhara Muhammad Nasrullah Bahadur. The Afghan emir Dost Mohammad Khan was also married to another of Nazir Khairulla Khan's daughters, and the two merchants found themselves on favorable terms with the British at Peshawar following the Second Anglo-Sikh War.

On 28 September 1860, Abdul Mejid was dispatched from Peshawar as a pundit by the division commissioner Hugh Rees James (1823–1864) and the governor-general of India, Earl Canning. Provided with an official letter and gifts including music boxes, watches, and rifles, his mission was to journey to Kokand, establish contact and confirm Britain's friendship with its khan Muhammad Malla Beg, and assess the level of Russian influence and presence in the khanate. Because of the hostility at the time between Muhammad Nasrullah Bahadur and both Muhammad Malla Beg and Dost Mohammad Khan, Abdul Mejid was precluded from following the easiest route through Bukhara. Instead, he travelled through Kabul (8 October), the Hindu Kush and Khanabad (24 October), Fayzabad in the vassal emirate of Badakhshan (4 November), the Pamir Steppe (16 November), and the Taldyk Pass into Gulcha (5 December), reaching Kokand on 17 December. Muhammad Malla Beg being absent on a western raid of Oratepa (now Istaravshan), Abdul Mejid was entertained by local nobles until the khan's return on 7 January 1861. He had several audiences with the khan while compiling information for the British on local conditions.

Abdul Mejid left Kokand on 31 January 1861 but was detained until 10 March at nearby Yar Mazar (now Fergana) waiting for companions on his journey. One envoy was tasked to communicate with the British at Peshawar and another to travel to Constantinople (now Istanbul) to resume relations between Kokand and the Ottoman Empire. Abdul Mejid then passed through the Tengizbay Pass and along the Vakhsh River towards Kulob, whose lord Surrah Khan imprisoned the entire party at Khovaling on behalf of Bukhara. Reports of the disorder following Muhammad Nasrullah Bahadur's deposition, however, prompted the khan to release the party with gifts, entertainment, and well wishes. Crossing the Amu Darya, Abdul Mejid reentered Badakhshan and returned to Khanabad. He reached Kabul on 6 June and Peshawar on the 26th, relating his journey to James, who praised his clarity, sobriety, bravery, and utility and recommended a substantial payment be arranged for his troubles. (Note: James's report includes a detailed itinerary of the stops along Abdul Mejid's route with approximate distances between each. The Russian scholar Alexei Fedchenko subsequently matched James's sometimes irregular names—including the scribal error "Dysame Lake" for Abdul Mejid's intended "the same" in reference to two days' travel beside Lake Kara Kul—to known locations in his essay on the Kokand Khanate. Henry Yule attempted the same with a few of the lakes in his discussion of the headwaters of the Amu Darya attached to the 2nd edition of John Wood's Journey but was misled by the egregiously inaccurate hydrography produced by Wood and by earlier Chinese reports.)

== Legacy ==
His trip was the first recorded journey through the Pamir from south to north, in honor of which the Royal Geographical Society provided him with a gold watch valued at £26 6s. and a ceremony in London congratulating him in absentia overseen by Lord Strangford. Although Abdul Mejid had not undertaken any observations of latitude or longitude nor undertaken any surveying, his safe passage and detailed account of his route inspired Thomas George Montgomerie to expand the use of native Indian pundits for the Great Trigonometrical Survey and for British exploration in Tibet. The pundit Hyder Shah, "The Havildar", later reprised parts of Abdul Mejid's route while undertaking additional scientific observations.
