= Abd al-Karim Bukhari =

Abd al-Karim Bukhari (died after 1830/31) was a Bukharan traveler and writer of Tajik origin. He composed an untitled work, mostly focused on the history of Central Asia.

== Early life ==
He was born in Bukhara in the early 1760's. At the age of sixteen he traveled to Kashmir and back. He started his second journey in 1789-90, and traveled all the way through Semey, Yining, Aksu, Kashgar, Yarkent, Kashmir and Tibet.

== Career ==
=== Embassy of Bukhara ===
In 1799-1800 Abd al-Karim met Mahmud Shah Durrani while he was situated in Bukhara. He started working at the Bukharan embassy to the Russia Empire in 1804-05, with this embassy he spent 9 months in Saint Petersburg and also visited other places such as Moscow, Astrakhan and the Khanate of Khiva. Abd al-Karim came to Istanbul with the embassy to the Sublime Porte in October of 1807. While there, his family died of an infectious disease and he remarried.

=== Writer ===
He became the chief scribe of the ambassador of Bukhara in February of 1814. Bukhari finished his first major work in 1815, but updated the text later in 1830-31. This manuscript was about events in Central Asia with an emphasis on his homeland of Bukhara and Afghanistan. It documented events starting from the era of Nader Shah, and ending when he left Central Asia. There were also smaller portions dedicated to Khiva, Kokand, East Turkestan, Kashmir, Khorasan, Badakshan, Chitral, Darvaz, Kulob and Jammu.

== Sources ==
- Zand, Michael (1982). "ʿAbd-al-Karīm Boḵārī". In Yarshater, Ehsan (ed.). Encyclopædia Iranica (Online ed.). Encyclopædia Iranica Foundation. ISBN 978-0710090959.
