= Pollock Medal =

The Pollock Medal was a prize awarded to the best cadet of the season, in commemoration of Sir George Pollock's exploits in Afghanistan, first at the East India Company's Military Seminary at Addiscombe, and later at the Royal Military Academy, Woolwich.

== Foundation ==
In 1844, the British inhabitants of Calcutta raised a subscription of 11,000 rupees to commemorate General George Pollock's victories in Afghanistan after the disastrous retreat of the British army of occupation from Kabul in January 1842. This was to consist of a medal to be presented twice a year “to the most distinguished cadet at the East India Company’s Military Seminary, at Addiscombe, near Croydon in England, on passing the biennial examination for a commission.”

== Description ==
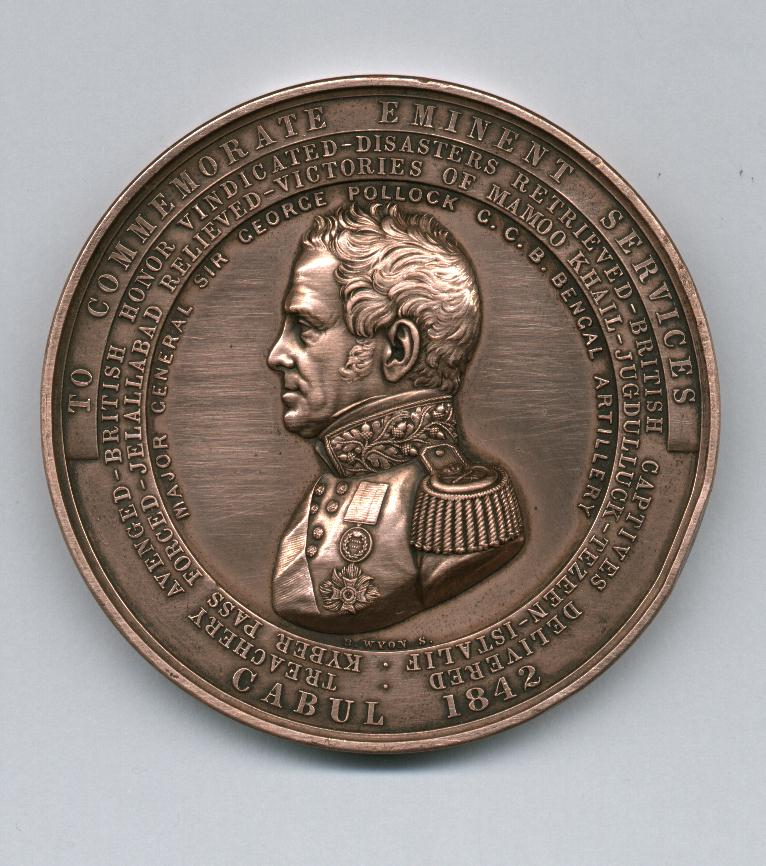
The original Pollock Prize

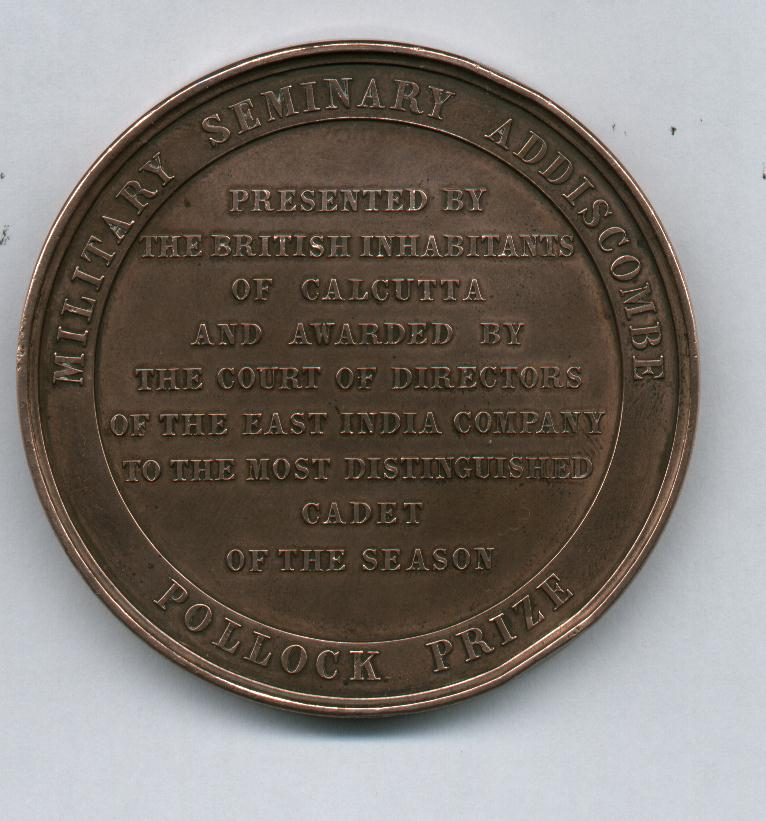
The reverse of the original Pollock Prize

The original medal, with a weight of 2oz and valued at sixteen guineas, was designed by General Macleod and was first presented in December 1847, with the following inscription:

To commemorate eminent services

Major-General Sir George Pollock, K.C.B.

Bengal Artillery, Cabul 1842

Treachery avenged – British honour vindicated – Disasters retrieved – British captives delivered – Khyber Pass forced – Jellalabad relieved – Victories of Mamoo Khail, Jugdulluck, Tezeen, Istaliff

And on the reverse:

Military Seminary, Addiscombe

Pollock Prize

Presented by the British Inhabitants of Calcutta, and Awarded by the Court of Directors of the East India Company, to the most distinguished Cadet of the Season.

== Changes ==
In 1861, the Secretary of State for India, who was now responsible for the management of Indian affairs after the British government had taken India over from the East India Company, decided to have a new medal of a smaller size. The medal was valued at twelve guineas, and part of the inscription recording the services of Sir George Pollock and his army was omitted.

The new version continued to have the portrait of Sir George Pollock but with the inscription:

Pollock, Cabul, 1842

And on its reverse:

Pollock Prize, Royal Military Academy

Founded by the British inhabitants of Calcutta to commemorate the eminent services of Major-General Sir George Pollock, G.C.B., and awarded to the most distinguished Cadet of the season

Although Sir George Pollock was not consulted over the changes, he continued to present the medal in person whenever his health allowed him until 4 months before his death, when he presented it to John Copsey Addison in June 1872.

In 1861 the East India Company handed over control of its Indian possessions to the British government and the East India Company's military units were incorporated into the British army. The Military Seminary at Addiscombe was closed and the Royal Military Academy at Woolwich took over the training of new officers, and the awarding of the Pollock Medal.

With the outbreak of the Second World War, the training course ceased. In 1947 the Royal Military Academy at Woolwich and Royal Military College at Sandhurst were amalgamated to become the Royal Military Academy Sandhurst. Sandhurst now presents the top cadet with the Queen's Medal.

== Holders ==
The following is the roll of Pollock Medallists until February 1875 as recorded on tablets fixed on the walls of the great dining hall of the Royal Military Academy at Woolwich:

=== Awarded at Addiscombe ===
NAME	AWARDED	GAZETTED TO	NAME	AWARDED	GAZETTED TO
Edward C.S. Williams	June, 1848	Bengal Engineers	James J. McL. Innes	December, 1848	Bengal Engineers
Thomas G. Montgomerie	June, 1849	Bengal Engineers	George A. Craster	December, 1849	Bengal Engineers
Patrick Stewart	June, 1850	Bengal Engineers	Frederick S. Stanton	December, 1850	Bengal Engineers
Henry Goodwyn	June, 1851	Ditto	James P. Basevi	December, 1851	Bengal Engineers
Arthur M. Lang	June, 1852	Bengal Engineers	Salisbury M. Trevor	December, 1852	Bengal Engineers
John U. Champain	June, 1853	Bengal Engineers	Edward R. Holland	December, 1853	Bombay Engineers
William Jeffreys	June, 1854	Bengal Engineers	Aeneas R. R. Macdonald	December, 1854	Temp. Commission H.E.I.Co's Engineers
Charles H. Luard	June, 1855	Bengal Engineers	John Eckford	December, 1855	Bengal Engineers
John M. McNeile	June, 1856	Bengal Engineers	John Herschel	December, 1856	Bengal Engineers
Keith A. Jopp	June, 1857	Bombay Engineers	Lewis C. Gordon	December, 1857	Bengal Engineers
William M. Campbell	June, 1858	Bombay Engineers	William H. Pierson	December, 1858	Bengal Engineers
Arthur W. Elliot	June, 1859	Not appointed – resigned the service	William Shepherd	December, 1859	Bengal Engineers
Allan J. C. Cunningham	June, 1860	Bengal Engineers	Kellow C. Pye	December, 1860	Royal Engineers
William J. Williamson	June, 1861	General List, Royal Infantry

=== Awarded at Woolwich ===
NAME	AWARDED	GAZETTED TO	NAME	AWARDED	GAZETTED TO
			Clayton S. Beauchamp	December, 1861	Royal Engineers
Thomas Fraser	June, 1862	Royal Engineers	Valentine F. Rowe	December, 1862	Royal Engineers
Herbert P. Knocker	June, 1863	Royal Engineers	Francis Mascall	December, 1863	Royal Engineers
Henry R. G. Georges	June, 1864	Royal Engineers	William G. Nicholson	December, 1864	Royal Engineers
Sydney L. Jacob	June, 1865	Royal Engineers	Charles M. Watson	December, 1865	Royal Engineers
John E. Broadbent	June, 1866	Royal Engineers	Harry M. Chambers	December, 1866	Royal Engineers
Felician R. de Wolski	June, 1867	Royal Engineers	Francis J. Day	December, 1867	Royal Engineers
George S. Clarke	June, 1868	Royal Engineers	Henry H. S. Cunynghame	December, 1868	Royal Engineers
Henry J. Harman	June, 1869	Royal Engineers	Richard de Villamil	December, 1869	Royal Engineers
Herbert C. Chermside	June, 1870	Royal Engineers	Philip Cardew	December, 1870	Royal Engineers
Henry G. Kunhardt	June, 1871	Royal Engineers	Henry E. McCallum	February, 1872	Royal Engineers
John C. Addison	June, 1872	Royal Engineers	William C. Godsal	October, 1872	Royal Engineers
Henry D. Love	February, 1873	Royal Engineers	John C. Campbell	June, 1973	Royal Engineers
Matthew H. P. R. Sankey	October, 1873	Royal Engineers	Charles F. Hadden	February, 1874	Royal Artillery
Hugh M. Sinclair	July, 1874	Royal Engineers	Maurice A. Cameron	February, 1875	Royal Engineers
Hubert J. Foster	July, 1875	Royal Engineers	Vincent H. P. Caillard	February, 1876	Royal Engineers
James H. Cowan	July, 1876	Royal Engineers	William H Turton	February, 1877	Royal Engineers
Alfred P. Codd	July, 1877	Royal Engineers	Henry D. Laffan	December, 1877	Royal Engineers
Edward Agar	April, 1878	Royal Engineers	Alfred M. Mantell	July, 1878	Royal Engineers
Stuart Davidson	December, 1878	Royal Engineers	John Winn	April, 1879	Royal Engineers
James Dallas	July, 1879	Royal Engineers	Edward H. Hemming	February, 1880	Royal Engineers
Matthew Nathan	May, 1880	Royal Engineers	William F. H. S. Kincaid	July, 1880	Royal Engineers
Cecil Hill	February, 1881	Royal Engineers	James E. Edmonds	July, 1881	Royal Engineers
James R. L. Macdonald	February, 1882	Royal Engineers	Ronald J. H. Mackenzie	July, 1882	Royal Engineers
George A. S. Stone	February, 1883	Royal Engineers	Walter G. Lawrie	July, 1883	Royal Engineers
James H. L'E. Johnstone	February, 1884	Royal Engineers	Charles F. Close	July, 1884	Royal Engineers
Edward A. Edgell	December, 1884	Royal Engineers	Hugh B. Williams	April, 1885	Royal Engineers
Gerald P. Lenox-Conyngham	September, 1885	Royal Engineers	H. M. St A. Wade	February, 1886	Royal Engineers
Charles H. Versturme	July, 1886	Royal Engineers	Theodore E. Naish	February, 1887	Royal Engineers
Reginald F. G. Bond	July, 1887	Royal Engineers	Edmund G. Godfrey-Faussett	February, 1888	Royal Engineers
W. M. Coldstream	July, 1888	Royal Engineers	Bertram H. Rooke	February, 1889	Royal Engineers
James M. C. Colvin	July, 1889	Royal Engineers	Joseph F. W. Johnson	February, 1890	Royal Engineers
Edward H. M. Leggett	July, 1890	Royal Engineers	Sydney G. Faber	February, 1891	Royal Engineers
Reginald Polwhell	July, 1891	Royal Engineers	Alexander W. H. Grubb	February, 1892	Royal Engineers
Charles E. Vickers	July, 1892	Royal Engineers	Walter C. Symon	February, 1893	Royal Artillery
Edmund T. Rich	July, 1893	Royal Engineers	John B. Corry	February, 1894	Royal Engineers
Arthur ff. Garrett	August, 1894	Royal Engineers	Harry O. Mance	March, 1895	Royal Engineers
Lambert C. Jackson	August, 1895	Royal Engineers	H. de L. Pollard-Lowsey	December, 1895	Royal Engineers
Robert H. Thomas	June, 1896	Royal Engineers	David Forster	December, 1896	Royal Engineers
Charles W. Biggs	June, 1897	Royal Engineers	Charles M. Browne	December, 1897	Royal Engineers
Phillip O. G. Usborne	June, 1898	Royal Engineers	Kenneth E. Edgeworth	December, 1898	Royal Engineers
Charles Hordern	June, 1899	Royal Engineers	Christopher C. Trench	December, 1899	Royal Engineers
Malcolm N. MacLeod	April, 1900	Royal Engineers	Edgar W. Cox	December, 1900	Royal Engineers
J. A. B. P. Bowen	July, 1901	Royal Engineers	C. W. Bushell	December, 1901	Royal Engineers
E. H. G. Kirke	July, 1902	Royal Engineers	C. R. Satterthwaite	December, 1902	Royal Engineers
E. V. Binney	July, 1903	Royal Engineers	R. H. Stallard	December, 1903	Royal Engineers
D. G. Courtney	July, 1904	Royal Engineers	R. S. Ryan	December, 1904	Royal Artillery
E. M. Sinauer	July, 1905	Royal Engineers	R. Hamilton	December, 1905	Royal Engineers
A. Carrow	July, 1906	Royal Engineers	C. G. Moores	December, 1906	Royal Engineers
F. V. B. Witts	July, 1907	Royal Engineers	Rowland L. Almond	December, 1907	Royal Engineers
J. P. S. Greig	July, 1908	Royal Engineers	R. P. Pakenham-Walsh	December, 1908	Royal Engineers
C. L. T. Matheson	July, 1909	Royal Engineers	R. G. W. H. Stone	December, 1909	Royal Engineers
C. J. S. King	July, 1910	Royal Engineers	W. O. Winter	December, 1910	Royal Engineers
E. de S. Rideout	July, 1911	Royal Engineers	W. E. Euler	December, 1911	Royal Engineers
A. B. Aitken	July, 1912	Royal Engineers	G. L. Miller	December, 1912	Royal Engineers
E. F. Tickell	July, 1913	Royal Engineers	H. P. W. Hutson	December, 1913	Royal Engineers
A. D. Panke	July, 1914	Royal Engineers	H. A. J. Parsons	December, 1914	Royal Engineers
J. F. M. Whiteley	June, 1915	Royal Engineers	D. L. Middlemas	December, 1915	Royal Engineers
E. G. FitzHenry	June, 1916	Royal Engineers	R. W. P. Yates	December, 1916	Royal Engineers
D. Adamson	June, 1917	Royal Engineers	S. G. Galpin	December, 1917	Royal Engineers
E. I. C. Jacob	June, 1918	Royal Engineers	W. G. C. Glossop	December, 1918	Royal Artillery
J. A. Sinclair	June, 1919	Royal Artillery	A. H. G. Napier	December, 1919	Royal Engineers
W. H. Ray	December, 1919	Royal Engineers	E. V. Daldy	July, 1920	Royal Engineers
Not Issued	December, 1920		G. N. Tuck	July, 1921	Royal Engineers
N. A. M. Swettenham	December, 1921	Royal Engineers	A. J. H. Dove	July, 1922	Royal Engineers
J. B. Tupman	December, 1922	Royal Field Artillery	L. R. E. Fayle	July, 1923	Royal Engineers
E. L. Kellett	December, 1923	Royal Engineers	A. W. Kiggell	July, 1924	Royal Engineers
J. C. R. Fitzgerald-Lombard	December, 1924	Royal Engineers	W. F. Anderson	July, 1925	Royal Engineers
C. P. Jones	December, 1925	Royal Engineers	J. P. Chapman	December, 1925	Royal Engineers
W. B. Sallitt	July, 1926	Royal Engineers	M. C. Perceval	December, 1926	Royal Engineers

The above two lists are taken from the Memoir to Illustrate the Origin and Foundation of the Pollock Medal (1875), published anonymously but probably written by Field Marshal Sir Lintorn Simmons. Updated March 2016 by the son (see edit history for contact information) of the December 1928 recipient to include recipients after July 1875 using supplementary pages in his father's copy of the book. The following list was created from the RMAS Old College Notice Board. Note that in December 1925 there were two classes commissioned (Last of 4-term; first of 3-term.)

NAME	AWARDED	GAZETTED TO	NAME	AWARDED	GAZETTED TO
R. W. Ewbank	July, 1927	Royal Engineers	A. E. H. Hamilton	December, 1927	Royal Artillery
H. E. C. de Chassiron	July, 1928	Royal Artillery	W. H. C. Travers	December, 1928	Royal Engineers
K. R. Brazier-Creagh	1929	Royal Artillery	P. G. Hatch	1929	Royal Engineers
J. G. McKendrick	1930	Royal Engineers	A. P. Lavies	1930	Royal Engineers
A. H. G. Dobson	1931	Royal Engineers	D. C. Cameron	1931	Royal Engineers
A. F. Bell	1932	Royal Engineers	H. L. Lloyd	1932	Royal Engineers
R. L. White	1933	Royal Engineers	H. R. Carr	1933	Royal Engineers
T. G. H. Kirkwood	1934	Royal Engineers	A. C. Lewis	1934	Royal Engineers
E. M. Hall	1935	Royal Engineers	John E. L. Carter	1935	Royal Engineers
R. N. K. Barge	1936	Royal Engineers	J. M. Flint	1936	Royal Engineers
D. Ross	1937	Royal Engineers	R. F. Harris	1937	Royal Engineers
M. H. D. Lovell	1938	Royal Artillery	John R. E. Hamilton-Baillie	1938	Royal Engineers
David J. Willison	1939	Royal Engineers
