= Henry John Harman =

Henry John Harman (13 May 1850 – 14 April 1883) was a Royal Engineers officer who was involved in surveys in the Himalayas of northeastern India as part of the Great Trigonometrical Survey. He was involved in recruiting and organizing "pandit" explorers to trace out the upper Brahmaputra river and to discover if it was the same as the Tsang-Po. A pheasant species Crossoptilon harmani was named after him and was for sometime called as Harman's pheasant.

== Life and work ==
Harman was born in Halesworth, Suffolk, on 13 May 1850, and trained at the Royal Military Academy at Woolwich where he received a Pollock Medal as best cadet in 1869. He graduated on 7 July 1869, and was commissioned as a lieutenant in the Royal Engineers. He joined the Great Trigonometrical Survey in 1872 on the recommendation of T. G. Montgomerie. In 1878 he was posted to Darjeeling. He served on the Dafla expedition (1874-75) under Godwin-Austen and in the Miri Hills (1877-78) under Colonel R.G. Woodthorpe. He was involved in surveys of the river valleys of the Dehing, the Debang, the Subansiri and other braids of the Brahmaputra river. He began to study the Tibetan language from 1878 from a lama in a Sikkim monastery named Nem Singh. In order to identify the branching of the rivers, he sent Nem Singh (G.M.N. on official records) and another survey assistant Kinthup to cut down and float marked logs into the river. They reached up to a place called Chetang. In 1880 he sent another lama (probably Ugyen Gyatso) with Kinthup. This scheme however did not work beyond certain points after which his surveyors were prevented from moving by the local tribes. He also attempted to figure out the flow and connectivity of the streams by estimating their flows. In one survey to the Donkia pass accompanied by two Tibetan assistants, he camped outdoors with a camp fire. In the morning he found his feet frostbitten and had to be assisted back and half his toes needed to be amputated. He interacted with Buddhists and was a visitor to numerous monasteries. He continued his surveys and went towards Kanchenjunga but fell ill on the way and he then was forced to take leave and join his sisters who lived in Florence. He died in Florence from pneumonia associated with tuberculosis.

Henry John Elwes visited Harman at his home in Darjeeling and found a skin of the pheasant hanging on his wall. He recognized it as a new species even though the specimen was in poor condition. It had been collected by Harman's native surveyors.
