= Orzu Iso =

Tajik journalist, poet and songwriter

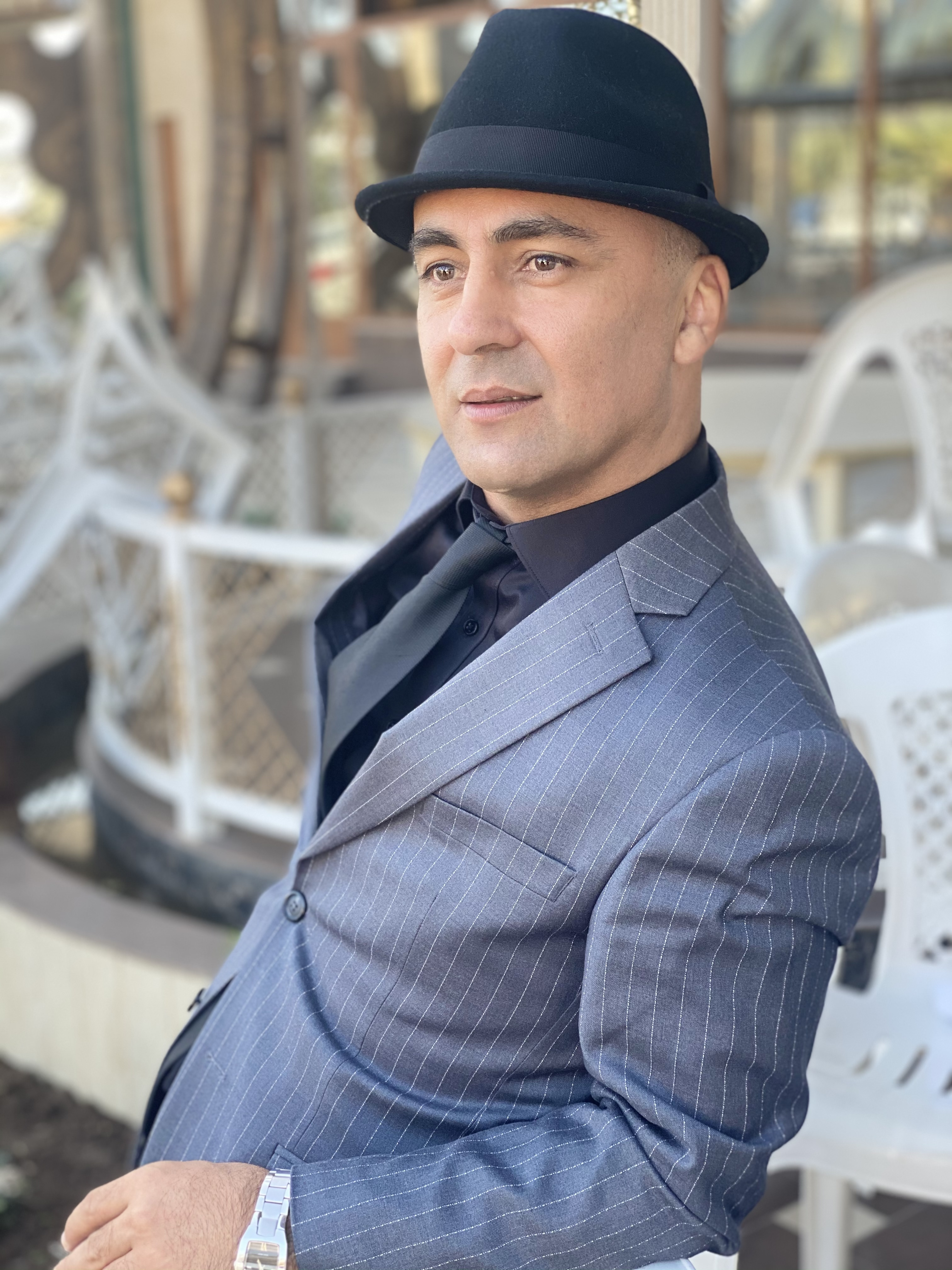
- Born: 14 October 1976 (age 50); Kulab, Kulab Region, Tajik SSR
- Occupations: journalist, poet and songwriter
- Years active: 2001–present

Orzu Iso (Tajik: Орзу Исо, Persian: آرزو عیسی, or Orzu Isoev; born 14 October 1976) is a Tajik presenter, TV and radio journalist, songwriter and blogger.

== Biography ==
Isoev was born on 14 October 1976 in the city of Kulab, Kulab region, and grew up in the city of Kurgan-Tyube. When he was four years old, his parents divorced. In 2013, he graduated from the Faculty of Journalism of the Tajik State Institute of Arts, named after Mirzo Tursunzade.

== Works ==
Isoev writes poetry according to the aruz system, as well as in the form of free verse. Orzu began to write when he was in high school in the city of Kurgan-Tyube. From a poor family, he did not expect to be able to have a career in poetry and creative arts.

Songs written by Isoev have been performed by Tajik and Uzbek performers, such as: Sadriddin Najmiddin, Shabnam Surayo, Mehrnigor Rustam, Zulaykho Mahmadshoeva, Nigina Amonqulova, Yulduz Usmonova, Ozoda Nursaidova.

== Bibliography ==
- Орзу Исо. Дар пардаҳои атласии нури офтоб (шеърҳо), — Душанбе: «Эҷод», 2009. — 52 с.
- Iso, Orzu; Ërmuḣammad, Ravshani (2012). Taronai tanḣoī (in Tajik). Adib. ISBN 978-99947-2-253-2.
- Iso, Orzu (2015). On sūi ëdḣo (in Tajik). ĖR-graf. ISBN 978-99975-46-38-8.
