= James John McLeod Innes =

VC recipient and engineer

Lieutenant-General James John McLeod Innes VC CB
- Born: 5 February 1830; Bhagalpur, British India
- Died: 13 December 1907 (aged 77); Cambridge, England
- Burial place: Cambridge City Cemetery, Cambridge
- Military career
- Allegiance: United Kingdom
- Branch: Bengal Army; British Army
- Rank: Lieutenant-General
- Units: Bengal Engineers; Royal Engineers
- Conflicts: Indian Mutiny
- Awards: Victoria Cross; Order of the Bath
- Other work: Author

Lieutenant-General James John McLeod Innes VC CB (5 February 1830 – 13 December 1907) was a Scottish recipient of the Victoria Cross, the highest and most prestigious award for gallantry in the face of the enemy that can be awarded to British and Commonwealth forces.

Born in British India to Scottish parents, Innes was educated privately, then at Edinburgh University and at Addiscombe Military Seminary, military academy of the East India Company where he was awarded the Pollock Medal. He was commissioned into the Bengal Engineers in 1848 and, after further training, he arrived in India in November 1850. When the Indian Mutiny began in May 1857 he was at Lucknow, where he helped to defend the city throughout its siege. After the evacuation of Lucknow in November 1897, he served in military operations in Oudh State.

Innes was a 28 year old lieutenant in the Bengal Engineers, Bengal Army during the Indian Mutiny on 23 February 1858 at Sultanpore, India, where he was awarded Victoria Cross for the following deed:

Bengal Engineers, Lieutenant John James M'Leod Innes

Date of Act of Bravery, 23rd February, 1858

At the action at Sultanpore, Lieutenant Innes, far in advance of the leading skirmishers, was the first to secure a gun which the enemy were abandoning. Retiring from this, they rallied round another gun further back, from which the shot would, in another instant have ploughed through our advancing columns, when Lieutenant Innes rode up, unsupported, shot the gunner who was about to apply the match, and, remaining undaunted at his post, the mark for a hundred matchlock men, who were sheltered in some adjoining huts, kept the Artillerymen at bay, until assistance reached him. (Letter from Major-General Thomas Harte Franks, K.C.B., of 12th March, 1858.)

For his work in the Mutiny, he was also mentioned in dispatches three times and received the brevet rank of major.

After the Mutiny campaign Innes continued to serve in India, with the Royal Engineers (Bengal). After holding a number of military and civil engineering posts, he was finally promoted to major-general in 1885. In March 1886 he retired with the honorary rank of lieutenant-general, after which he wrote a number of books, mostly relating to the history of the Indian Mutiny. In June 1907, on the fiftieth anniversary of the Mutiny, Innes became a Companion of the Order of the Bath (CB), military division. He died on 13 December 1907 aged 77 at his home in Cambridge.

His Victoria Cross is displayed in the Royal Engineers Museum at Chatham, England.

== Works ==
- Lucknow and Oude in the Mutiny a Narrative and a Study. A.D.Innes & Co. 1896. OCLC 29087493.
- The Sepoy Revolt, Ad. Innes & Co (1 January 1897), ASIN:B0028SZ7UK
- Sir Henry Lawrence: The Pacificator. Rulers of India series. Clarendon Press. 1898. OCLC 1243683218.
- The Life and Times of General Sir James Browne RE KCB KCSI (Buster Browne), John Murray; (1 January 1905) ASIN:B001Q4DNMQ
