= Richard de Villamil =

Lieutenant-Colonel Richard de Villamil (1850–1936) was a British Army officer and physicist, who wrote a biography of Isaac Newton.

== Life ==
He was of English and Spanish descent. His father, Martin de Villamil owned a large property in Kingston, Jamaica.

=== Military career ===
He attended the Royal Military Academy at Woolwich where he won the Pollock Medal in December 1869. He became an officer in the Royal Engineers, serving in India during the 1870s. He was later posted to Cork in Ireland, and then, in 1886, to Jamaica, where he spent four years, during which time he built the Victoria Battery at Port Royal. He retired from the army in 1896 with the rank of Lieutenant-Colonel.

=== Scientific interests ===
He was elected a member of the Royal Institution in 1902.

In 1927 he wrote an article in the Bookman, entitled The Tragedy of Sir Isaac Newton's Library. Newton's library had remained intact, but unrecognised, in the possession of the Wykeham-Musgrave family of Barnsley Park until 1920. In that year much of it had been sold, with no realisation of its significance, at a low price, and many volumes pulped. However, some purchasers discovered that their books had been Newton's. Following the publication of his article, de Villamil visited Barnsley Park and identified 860 books as having belonged to the scientist.

He had previously also traced an inventory of Newton's estate at the time of his death in the records of the Prerogative Court of Canterbury, which were kept at Somerset House. de Villamil described the list as "so complete and so detailed that we could easily re-furnish every room in Newton's house (if it still existed) as it was at the time of his death". He included it in his biography Newton, The Man, which was published in 1931 with a preface by Albert Einstein.

== Writings ==
- ABC of Hydrodynamics (E & FN Spon, 1912)
- The Laws of Avanzini. Laws of planes moving at an angle in air and water (1912)
- Motion of Liquids (E & FN Spon, 1914)
- Resistance of air (1917)
- Soaring flight: a simple mechanical solution of the problem (1920)
- Rational Mechanics (E & FN Spon, 1928)
- Newton: the Man ... Foreword by Professor Albert Einstein. (Gordon D Knox. Publication c1931) [With "Catalogue of the Library of Dr. James Musgrave ... amongst which are included the books in Newton's Library", and "Supplementary List of Sir Isaac Newton's Books". ] (1931)
