= Kulob District =

Kulob District Russian: Кулябский район Tajik: Ноҳияи Кӯлоб
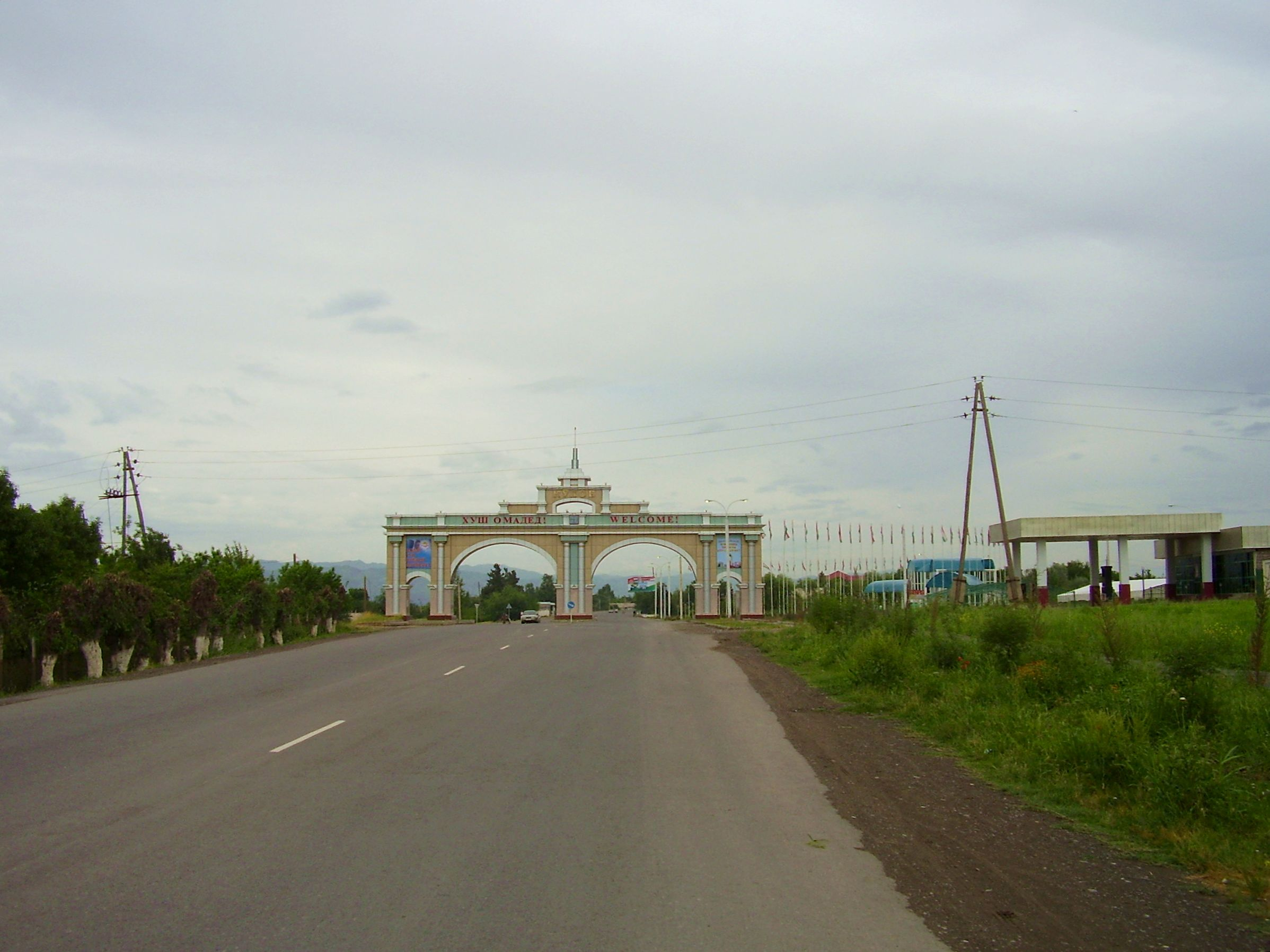

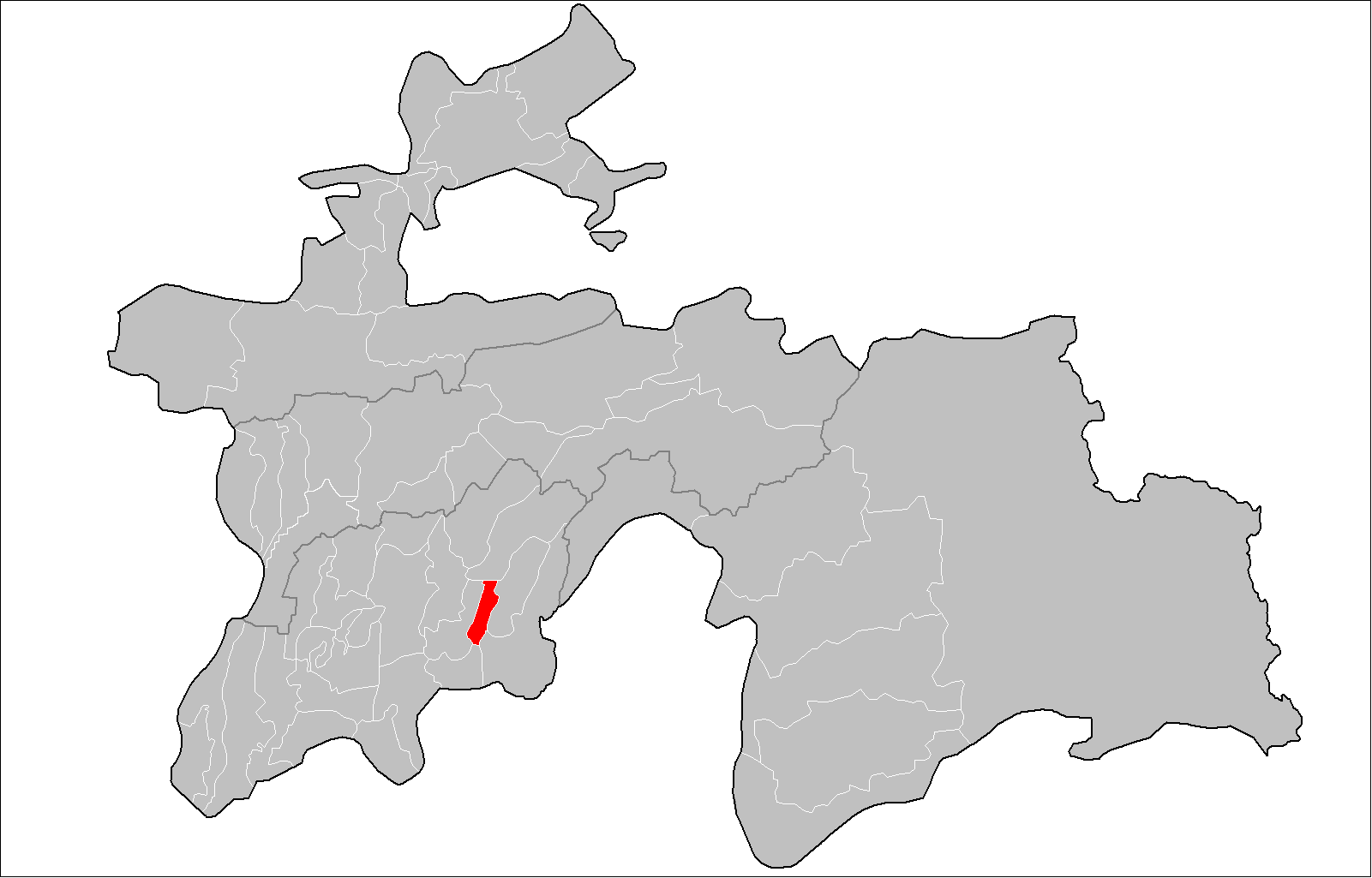

- Kulob District Location in Tajikistan
- Coordinates: 37°54′43″N 69°46′51″E
- Country: Tajikistan
- Region: Khatlon
- Capital: Kulob
- Established: 23 Nov 1930

Area
  - Total: 272.9 km^{2} (105.4 sq mi)

Population (2009)
  - Total: 89,400
  - Density: 328/km^{2} (848/sq mi)
  - Ethnicities: Tajik
  - Languages: Tajik-Persian
- Time zone: UTC+5
- Area code: +992,3322
- Official languages: Russian (Interethnic); Tajik (State)

Kulob District or Nohiya-i Kulob (Russian: Кулябский район; Tajik: Ноҳияи Кӯлоб, romanized: Nohiya‘i Kûlob/Nohijaji Kūloʙ) is a former district in Khatlon Region, Tajikistan. Its capital was Kulob. Around 2018, it was merged into the city of Kulob.

== Administrative divisions ==
The district was divided administratively into jamoats. They were as follows (and population).

Jamoats of Kulob District
Jamoat	Population
Dahana	21320
Kulob	11969
Zarbdor, Kulob	16240
Ziraki	21522
