= Kulob =

City in southwestern Tajikistan

Kulob Tajik: Кӯлоб
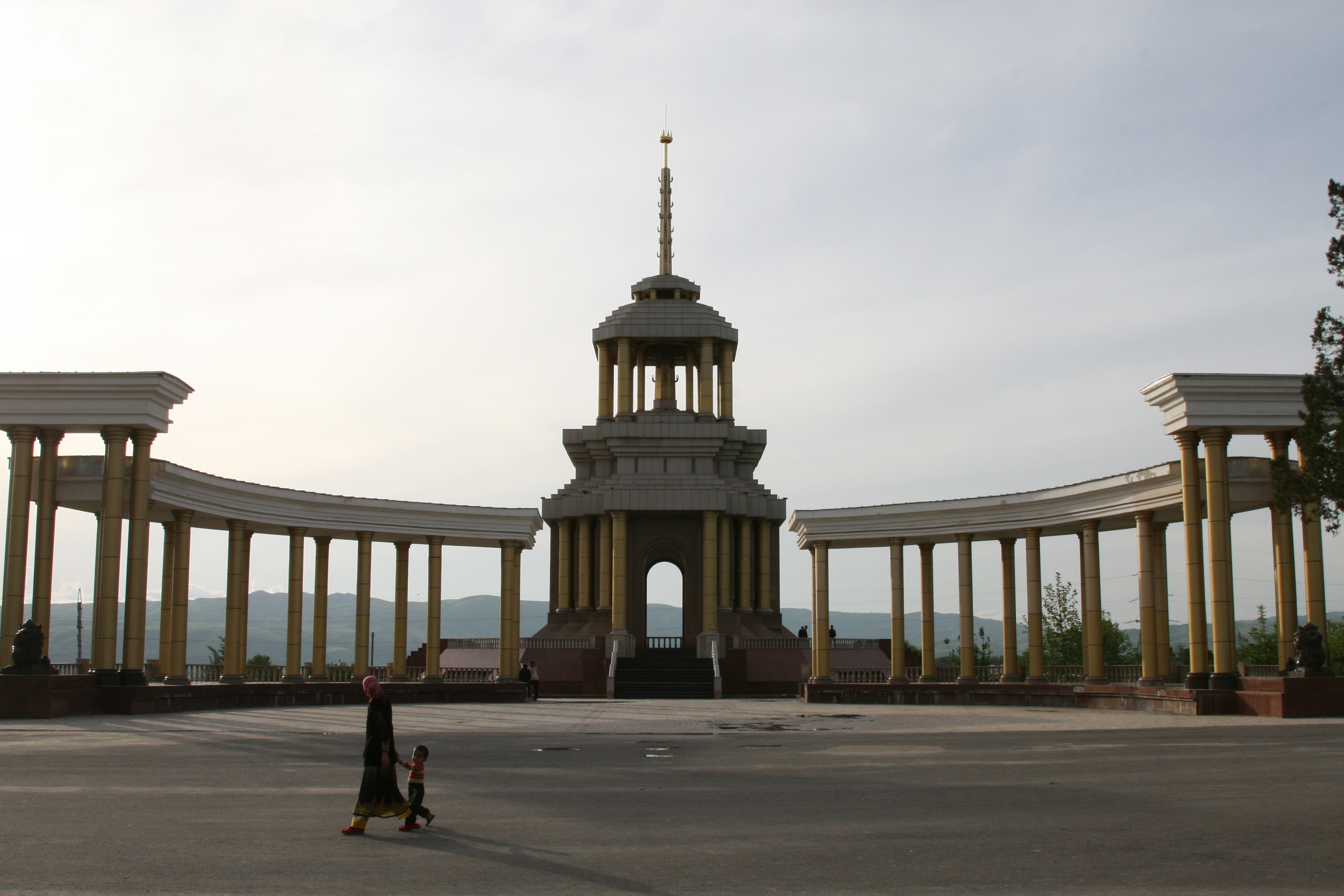
- The 2700th Anniversary monument, Kulob

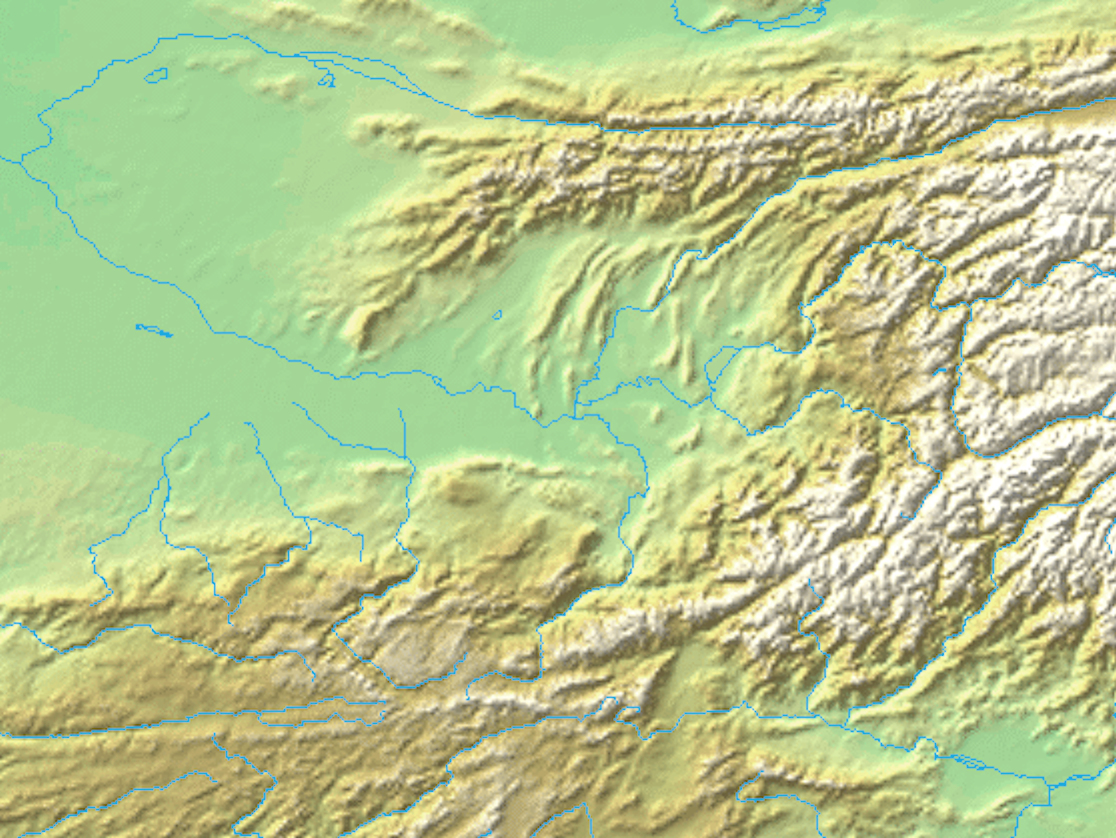
- Location in Tajikistan Kulob (Bactria) Kulob (West and Central Asia)
- Coordinates: 37°54′33″N 69°46′55″E
- Country: Tajikistan
- Region: Khatlon Region
- Elevation: 580 m (1,900 ft)

Population (2020)
  - City: 214,700
  - Urban: 106,300
- Postal code: 735360
- Official languages: Russian (Interethnic); Tajik (State)

Kulob (Note: /kʊˈlɒb/ kuu-LOB; Tajik: Кӯлоб, romanized: Kūlob, IPA: [kʰɵˈlɔb]; Russian: Куляб, romanized: Kuljab, IPA: [kʊˈlʲæp]) is a city in Khatlon Region in southern Tajikistan. Located 203 km (126 mi) southeast of the capital Dushanbe on the river Yakhsu (a right tributary of Panj), it is one of the largest cities in the country. Its population is estimated at 106,300 for the city proper and 214,700 for the city with the outlying communities (2020). The city is served by Kulob Airport.

== History ==
=== Greek inscription ===
During the Hellenistic period following the conquests of Alexander the Great, the region of modern Kulob was part of the Greco-Bactrian Kingdom. A Greek inscription dating to the period 200–195 BC has been discovered in which a person named Heliodotos dedicates a fire altar to Hestia for the sake of the king Euthydemus I and his son Demetrius I.

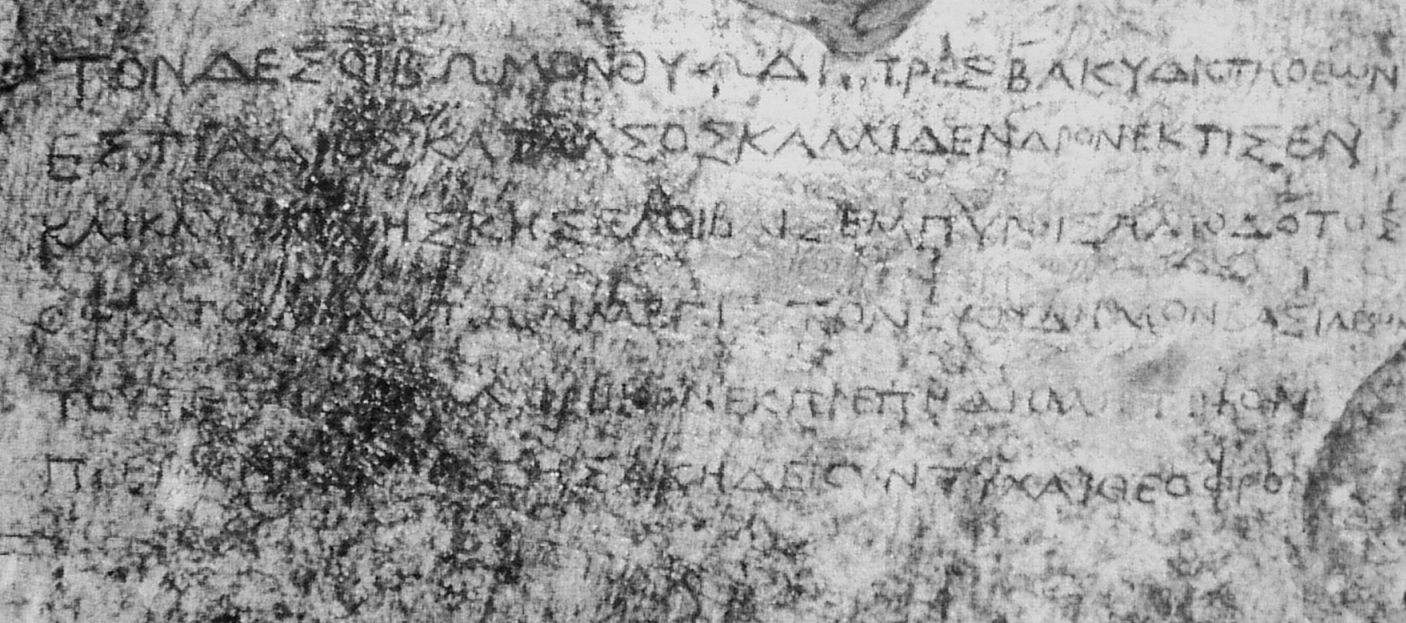
Kulob inscription, 200–195 BC: "Heliodotos dedicated this fragrant altar for Hestia, venerable goddess, illustrious amongst all, in the grove of Zeus, with beautiful trees; he made libations and sacrifices so that the greatest of all kings Euthydemos, as well as his son, the glorious, victorious and remarkable Demetrios, be preserved of all pains, with the help of Tyche with divine thoughts."

=== Later history ===
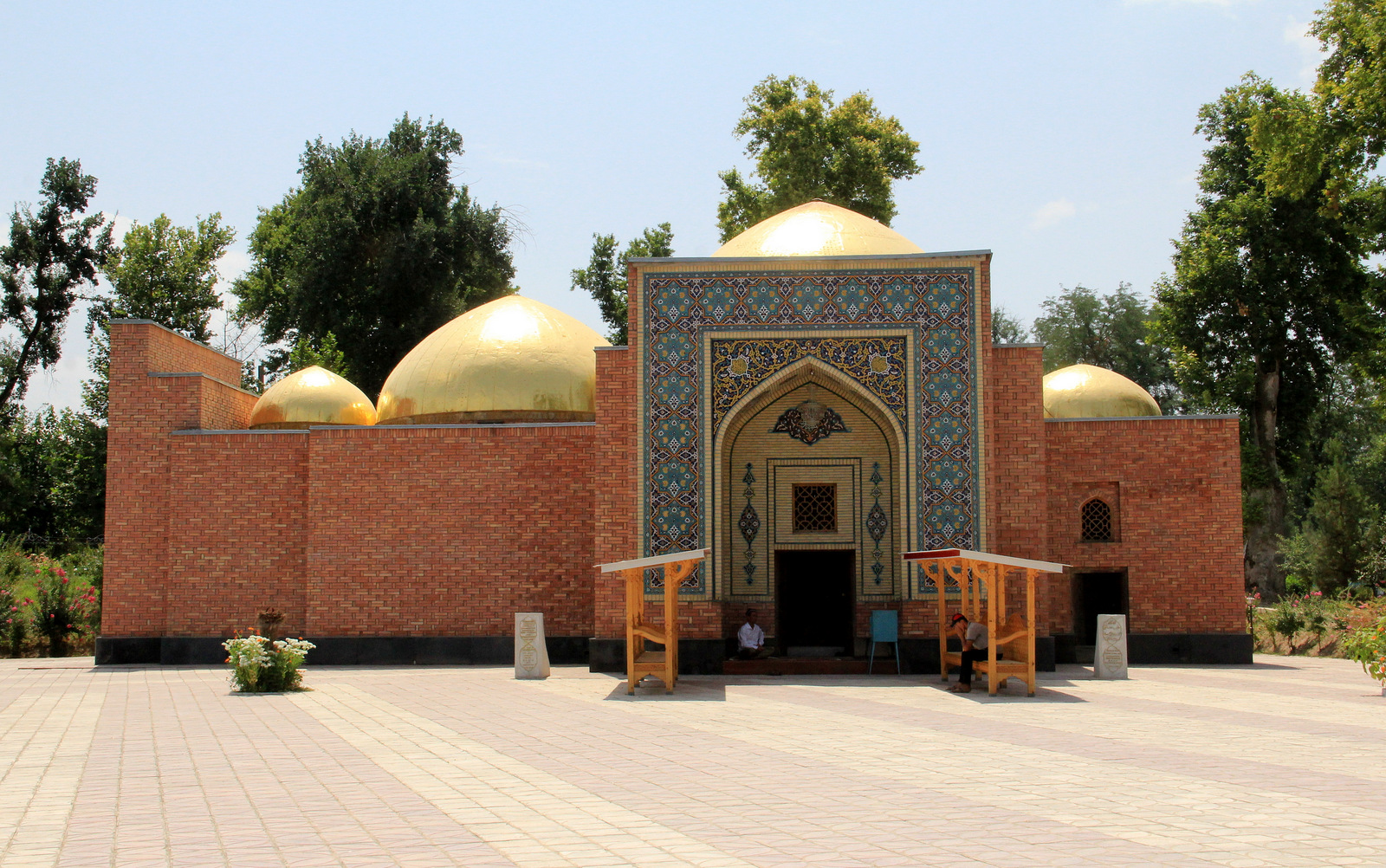
Tomb of Mir Sayyid Ali Hamadani

The historian Muhammad ibn Jarir al-Tabari refers to Khatlon as early as AD 737, although its founding is said to have been much earlier. The Sufi mystic Mir Sayyid Ali Hamadani died while travelling through Central Asia in 1384 and was buried in Khatlon in a tomb which still stands.

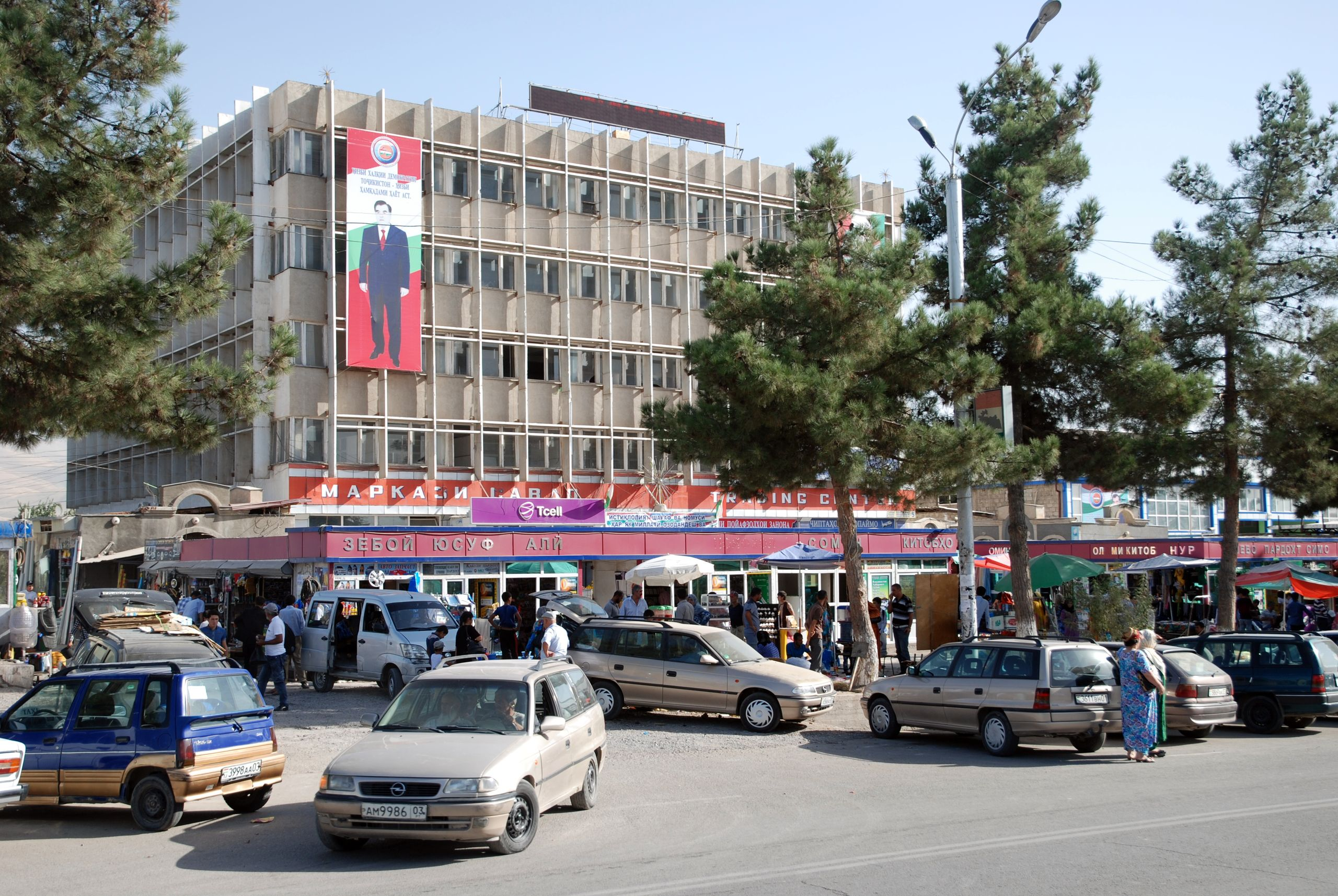
Kulob Marketplace

The city was conquered by the Mongol Empire under Genghis Khan and subsequently formed part of the Timurid Empire. It was incorporated into the Khanate of Bukhara in 1559 and subsequently usually aligned with the Emirate of Bukhara against Kokand and Afghanistan after the 18th century. Its name was changed to Kulob in 1750. The local lord Surrah Khan imprisoned the British and Kokand agent Abdul Mejid on behalf of Bukhara in 1861 before the disorder in the emirate prompted him to release the party.

Following agreements between the British and Russian Empires over the disposition of Afghanistan, the city and its hinterland were incorporated into the Russian Empire as part of its conquest of most of Central Asia. After the Russian Revolution, Kulob was only incorporated into the Soviet Union in March 1921 and was organized as part of the Tajik Soviet Socialist Republic in 1929. Kulob was one of the largest cities in the republic.

During the Tajikistani Civil War in the early 1990s, the city served as the main base of the Popular Front militias. Danghara, a village in the Kulob area, is the birthplace of Tajikistan's president Emomali Rahmon. In September 2006, Kulob celebrated its 2700th anniversary.

After Tajikistan's independence in 1991, Kulob was one of the three cities—alongside Dushanbe and Qurghonteppa—where the Russian 201st Motor Rifle Division was deployed. Following a number of scandals with local residents, Russia unexpectedly pulled its troops from Kulob in November 2015, effectively abandoning the base there.

== Geography ==
=== Climate ===
Kulob has a hot-summer Mediterranean climate (Köppen climate classification: Csa). The average annual temperature is 15.8 °C (60.4 °F). The warmest month is July with an average temperature of 28.3 °C (82.9 °F) and the coolest month is January with an average temperature of 2.2 °C (36.0 °F). The average annual precipitation is 590.0 mm (23.23 in) and has an average of 103 days with precipitation. The wettest month is March with an average of 133 mm (5.2 in) of precipitation and the driest month is August with an average of 1.1 mm of precipitation.

Climate data for Kulob (1961-1990 normals)
Month	Jan	Feb	Mar	Apr	May	Jun	Jul	Aug	Sep	Oct	Nov	Dec	Year
Mean daily maximum °C (°F)	8.2 (46.8)	10.6 (51.1)	16.5 (61.7)	23.2 (73.8)	28.8 (83.8)	35.6 (96.1)	37.7 (99.9)	36.6 (97.9)	31.1 (88.0)	24.2 (75.6)	17.3 (63.1)	11.0 (51.8)	23.4 (74.1)
Mean daily minimum °C (°F)	−4.8 (23.4)	−3.3 (26.1)	2.0 (35.6)	7.5 (45.5)	11.6 (52.9)	15.6 (60.1)	17.3 (63.1)	15.3 (59.5)	10.9 (51.6)	6.1 (43.0)	1.9 (35.4)	−1.8 (28.8)	6.5 (43.8)
Average precipitation mm (inches)	70.4 (2.77)	90.4 (3.56)	133.1 (5.24)	108.0 (4.25)	54.9 (2.16)	4.5 (0.18)	2.8 (0.11)	1.1 (0.04)	1.7 (0.07)	25.9 (1.02)	39.2 (1.54)	58.1 (2.29)	590.1 (23.23)
Average precipitation days (≥ 0.1 mm)	12	13	16	15	12	4	3	2	2	6	8	10	103
Average relative humidity (%)	75.5	72.2	68.0	63.6	55.0	39.1	34.0	35.1	38.4	49.4	62.4	71.8	55.4
Source 1: WMO
Source 2: (humidity)"The Climate of Kulob". Weatherbase.

== Subdivisions ==
Before ca. 2018, Kulob was the seat of Kulob District, which covered Kulob's outlying rural areas. The city of Kulob covers Kulob proper and four jamoats. These are as follows:

Jamoat	Population (Jan. 2015)
Dahana	29,776
Kulab	19,840
Zarbdor	23,839
Ziraki	28,747

== Notable people ==
- Orzu Iso (born 1976), presenter, TV and radio journalist, songwriter and blogger
- Mavzuna Chorieva (born 1992), boxer
- Moses Znaimer (born 1942), co-founder of Citytv
- Shabnam Surayyo (born 1981), singer
- Manija Dawlat (born 1982), singer
