= Hari Ram (pundit) =

Land surveyor in Colonial India

Hari Ram was a pundit (a native Indian surveyor used by the British to covertly explore regions north of British India) who explored the region around Mount Everest in 1871–1872. At first he was not allowed to enter Tibet, but his luck changed when he met a district official whose wife was ill. He examined her, checked his medical book for a disease with similar symptoms, and gave her some pills. To his own surprise, the woman recovered, and from then he found relatively little difficulty in travelling on. He gave a frightening account of his trip along the Bhote Koshi river:

He followed the general course of the Bhotia-Kosi River, which he was obliged to cross fifteen times within twenty-five miles [40 km]. At one place the river ran in a gigantic chasm, the sides of which were so close to one another that a bridge of 24 paces was sufficient to span it. Near this bridge the precipices were so impractible that the path had to be supported on iron pegs let into the face of the rock - the path being formed by bars of iron and slabs of stone stretching from peg to peg and covered with earth. This extraordinary path is in no place more than eighteen inches [460 mm], and often not more than nine inches [230 mm] in width, and is carried for more than a third of a mile [500 m] along the face of the cliff, at some 1,500 feet [500 m] above the river, which could be seen roaring below in its narrow bed. The Pundit, who has seen much difficult ground in the Himalayas, says he never in his life met anything to equal this bit of path.

During his voyage, Hari Ram had opened up 30,000 square miles (78,000 km^{2}) of virtually unknown territory. He had travelled all the way around Mount Everest, but because other mountains stood in between, he never actually saw it. On a second journey, Hari Ram traversed northern Nepal from west to east.
