= Manija Dawlat =

Tajikistani musician

Manizha Davlat Манижа Давлат
- Born: Manizha Davlatova; 31 December 1982 (age 43); Kulob, Tajik SSR, USSR
- Genres: Pop; Dance
- Occupation: Singer
- Instrument: Hand drum
- Years active: 2001 – 2006
- Label: Various

Manizha Davlat (Tajik: Манижа Давлат; born on December 31, 1982) (also spelled as Manizha Davlatova, Manija Davlat, Manizha Dawlat and Manija Dawlat) is a former Tajikistani pop singer. She is associated with Persian pop music. Manizha sings in Tajiki, a dialect of Modern Persian native to her country. She performs in concerts regularly in her native Tajikistan as well as other neighboring countries. She has fans in parts of Iran and Afghanistan, mainly among the Tajik people of Central Asia.

== Background ==
When Manija was young, her behavior and speech were not unusual like children of the same age, and she discovered her affinity for singing in front of her family. As a result, she wanted to become a singer. Her father was her first teacher, prioritising in the field of art, although he died. Manija started her career in 2001 with the song "Dar Labi Joy”. She also considers singer Zikrullah Hakimov to be her first teacher in the field of art.

Manizha was born in Kulob, Tajikistan. Since her concert in Mazar-e-Sharif and Kabul, she has gained popularity in Afghanistan in addition to building on her already established renown in Central Asian countries. A recent poll conducted in Kabul in 2003 named Manija (among Persian speakers) and Nazia Iqbal (among Pashto speakers) as the most popular female singers in that country.

As of 2004, she has two albums, both recorded live in Mazar-e-Sharif. Her concert in Kabul drew thousands of enthusiastic fans. Reportedly in both of these concerts, the stage was filled with flower bouquets.

In 2006, she performed in a series of concerts along Leila Forouhar in Dushanbe, Tajikistan.

Manija has not been performing since 2006. She claims the reason for this is her disappointment in today's Tajik pop culture and her present interest in Islam, which considers performing for entertainment as a sin.
