= Hubert Foster =

British-Australian Army officer

Hubert John Foster
- Born: 4 October 1855; Biggleswade, Bedfordshire, England
- Died: 21 March 1919 (aged 63); Cooma, New South Wales, Australia
- Military career
- Allegiance: United Kingdom; Australia
- Branch: British Army (1873–12); Australian Army (1916–18)
- Service years: 1873–1912; 1916–1918
- Rank: Brigadier General
- Commands: Chief of the General Staff
- Conflicts: Anglo-Egyptian War; First World War

Brigadier General Hubert John Foster (4 October 1855 – 21 March 1919) was a senior officer in the British Army and later Australian Army, who served as Chief of the Australian General Staff from 1916 to 1917.

== Military career ==
Educated at Harrow School and the Royal Military Academy, Woolwich and having won the Pollock Medal there, Foster was commissioned into the Royal Engineers as a lieutenant on 28 July 1875 although this was later antedated to 28 January 1875.

He was deployed to Cyprus when British troops occupied the island in 1878. He served in the Anglo-Egyptian War of 1882 and took part in the Battle of Tel el-Kebir and the occupation of Cairo. After promotion to captain on 28 January 1886, he joined the staff of the Commander-in-Chief, Ireland. He transferred to the military intelligence division of the War Office in 1890, and was promoted to major on 20 September 1894. In May 1893 he was transferred to serve there as a deputy assistant adjutant general.

In 1898 he was made Quartermaster-General of the Canadian Forces and managed the deployment of Canadian troops for the Second Boer War. In 1901 he went to Guernsey and Alderney as commanding Royal Engineer, and was promoted to lieutenant colonel on 1 October 1901.

From January 1903 he was British military attaché in Washington, D.C., and Mexico City. On 1 October 1904 he was made a brevet colonel and was placed on half-pay on 1 October 1906. On 11 December 1907 he was promoted to colonel, while still on half-pay.

Foster became a leading military writer following his appointment in 1906 as director of military science at the University of Sydney. He lobbied for the adoption of an expeditionary strategy with a major role for the Australian Army which was in sharp contrast to the views of Admiral Sir William Cresswell who advocated a policy of defending the shores of the continent of Australia.

He retired from the army on 4 October 1912.

Foster went on to serve in the First World War and was appointed Chief of the General Staff in January 1916. In March 1916 he became a temporary brigadier general in the Australian Military Forces (AMF). In October 1917 he became director of military art at the Royal Military College, Duntroon but resigned after a year due to ill health.

He was placed on the retired list, AMF, as an honorary brigadier general on 19 October 1918. He died at the age of 63 on 21 March 1919 at Carlaminda, near Cooma, New South Wales, and was buried in Cooma cemetery with Anglican rites. He was survived by his wife and their son, Sir John Galway Foster, who later became a member of the British House of Commons.

== Family ==
In 1904 he married Mary Agatha Gough, née Tobin.

Military offices
| Preceded by Colonel Godfrey Irving | Chief of the General Staff; 1916–1917 | Succeeded by Lieutenant General James Legge |
