= Philip Cardew =

English army officer

- Born: 24 September 1851; Oakshade, Surrey, UK
- Died: 17 May 1910 (aged 58); Crownpits House, Godalming, Surrey, UK
- Burial place: Brookwood Cemetery, Brookwood, Surrey, UK
- Children: 5
- Parents: Christopher Baldock Cardew (father); Eliza Jane (mother)

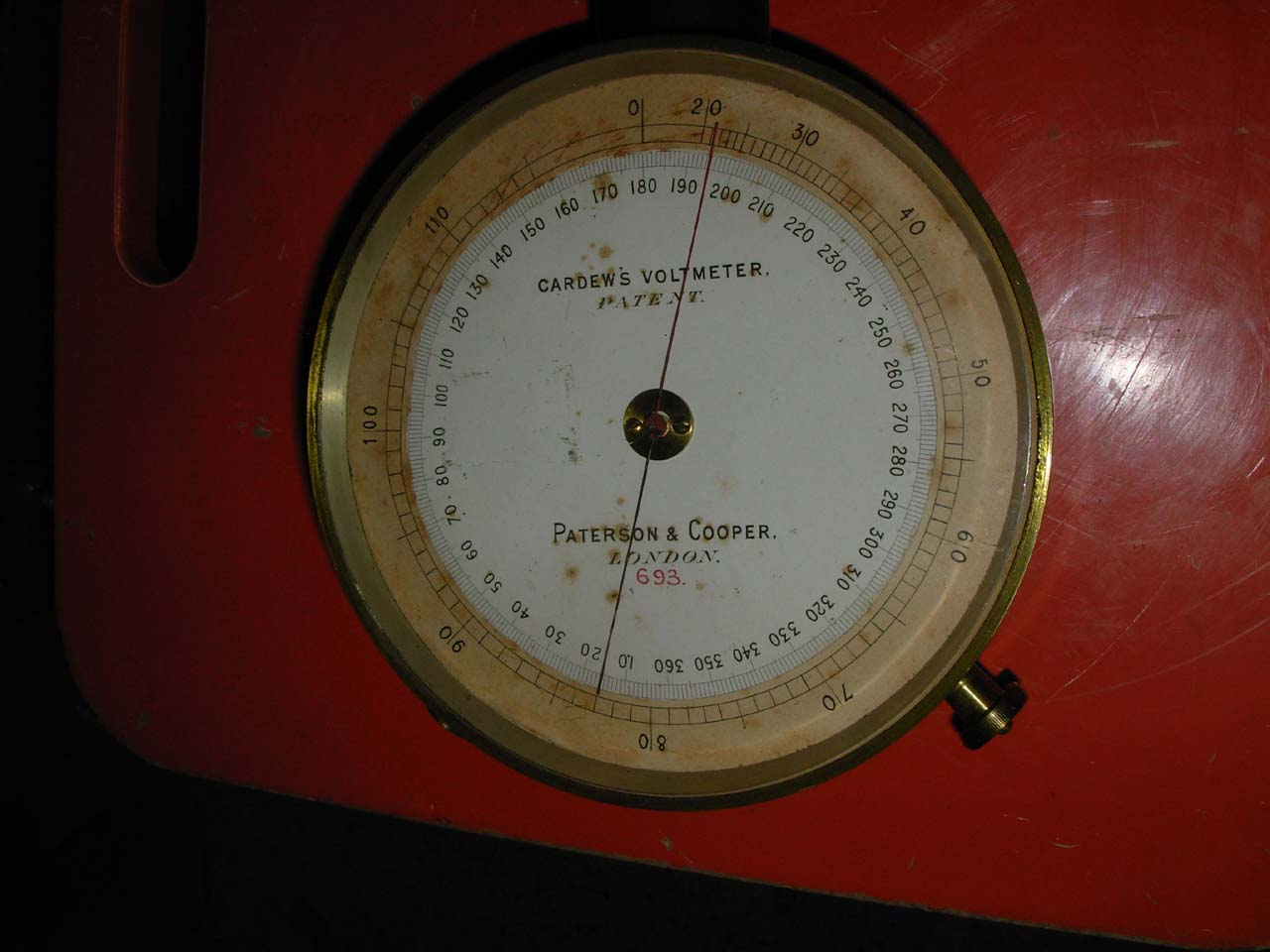
A Cardew voltmeter, patented by Philip Cardew in 1883, made by Paterson & Cooper between 1883 and 1899. In the Museo Nazionale Scienza e Tecnologia Leonardo da Vinci, Milan.

Major Philip Cardew (24 September 1851 – 17 May 1910), was an English army officer in the Royal Engineers. Engaged in the application of electricity to military purposes, he designed innovations in electrical engineering.

== Early life and career ==
Cardew was born at Oakshade, near Leatherhead, Surrey, on 24 September 1851, eldest son in a family of four sons and four daughters of Captain Christopher Baldock Cardew, 74th Highlanders, of East Hill, Liss, and his wife Eliza Jane, second daughter of Sir Richard Bethell, 1st Baron Westbury. Educated at Guildford Grammar School, he passed first into the Royal Military Academy, Woolwich, in 1868, and left it at the head of his batch. He was awarded the Pollock Medal and the Sword of Honour, and received a commission as lieutenant in the Royal Engineers on 4 January 1871.

After two years at Chatham, Cardew was sent to Aldershot and Portsmouth; from September 1873 to April 1874 he was employed at the War Office on defences; and, after a year at Glasgow, went to Bermuda in May 1875. He was placed in charge of military telegraphs, and joined the Submarine Mining Service, engaging in the application of electricity to military purposes, which was to be the pursuit of his life. At the end of 1876 he was transferred to Chatham, where the headquarters of the submarine mining was on board HMS Hood, which lay in the Medway off Gillingham. In 1878 he was acting adjutant of the submarine miners at Portsmouth, and became in the same year (1 April) assistant instructor in electricity at Chatham.

== Research ==
In addition to his work of instruction, Cardew assisted in carrying out some important experiments with electric searchlight apparatus for the Royal Engineers committee, at a time when the subject was in its infancy. The need of better instruments for such work led him to design a galvanometer for measuring large currents of electricity (described in a paper read before the Institution of Electrical Engineers, 25 May 1882). He next evolved the idea of the hot-wire galvanometer, or voltmeter, the value of which was universally recognised among electrical engineers. He was awarded the gold medal for this invention at the International Inventions Exhibition in London of 1885. He also originated a method of finding the efficiency of a dynamo.

Cardew's invention of the vibratory transmitter for telegraphy was perhaps his most important discovery, and in the case of faulty lines proved most useful, not only on active service in the Nile Expedition and in India, but also during heavy snowstorms at home. Cardew received a money reward for this invention, half from the Imperial and half from the Indian government. The utility of the invention was much extended by Cardew's further invention of "separators", consisting of a combination of "choking coil" and two condensers. These instruments enabled a vibrating telegraph circuit to be superimposed on an ordinary Morse circuit without interference between the two, thus doubling the message-carrying capability of the line. His apparatus for testing lightning conductors was adopted by the war department for service.

Promoted captain on 4 January 1883, and major on 12 April 1889, Cardew was from 1 April 1882 instructor in electricity at Chatham. On 1 April 1889 he was appointed the first electrical adviser to the Board of Trade. He held a long inquiry into the various proposals for the electric lighting of London, and drew up valuable regulations concerning the supply of electricity for power and for light.

== Later years ==
Cardew retired from the Royal Engineers on 24 October 1894, and from the Board of Trade in 1898. He then entered into partnership with Sir William Preece & Sons, consulting engineers, and was actively engaged on large admiralty orders, involving an expenditure of £1,500,000. He joined the board of the London Brighton and South Coast Railway in 1902.

Cardew paid two visits to Sydney, Australia, in connection with the city's electrical installations. Soon after his return home from the second visit in 1909, by way of Japan and Siberia, he died on 17 May 1910 at his residence, Crownpits House, Godalming, Surrey. He was buried at Brookwood Cemetery.

== Scientific papers ==
In 1881 Cardew wrote a paper on "The application of dynamo electric machines to railway rolling stock"; in 1894 he contributed a paper to the Royal Society on "Uni-directional currents to earth from alternate current systems"; and in 1901 he delivered the Cantor lecture before the Society of Arts on "Electric railways". He contributed several papers to the Institution of Electrical Engineers, on whose council he served for many years, and was vice-president in 1901–2.

== Family ==
Cardew married in London, on 19 June 1879, his first cousin, Mary Annunziata, daughter of Mansfield Parkyns. She survived him with three sons and two daughters.
