= Pundit (explorer) =

Native explorers who assisted British surveys of Asia

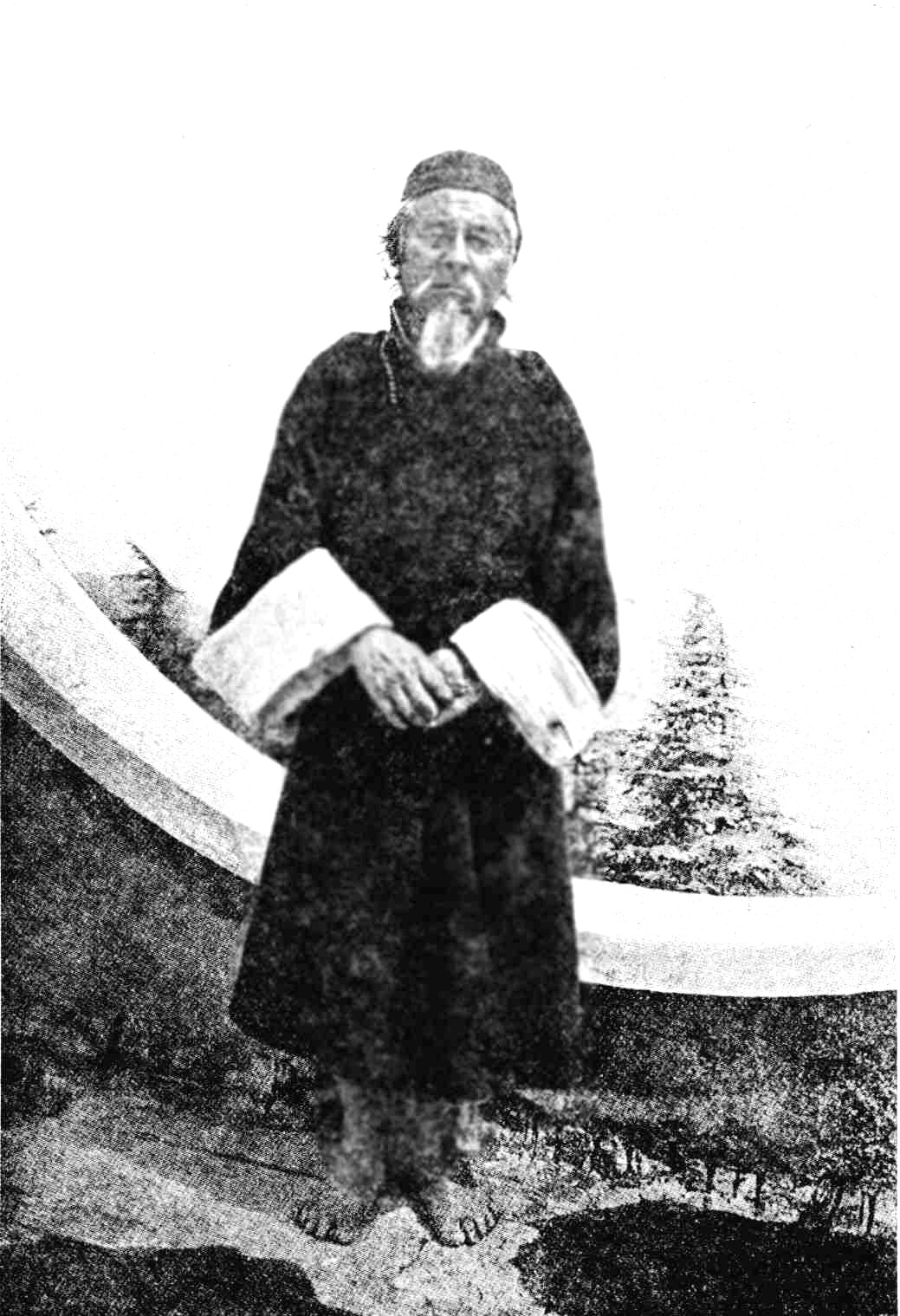
Kinthup, a Sikkimese pundit who explored Tibet in the late 19th century

The term pundit was used in the second half of the 19th century to denote native Indian surveyors used by the British to covertly explore regions north of British India. The Pundit was the code-name for one of the first native explorers, Nain Singh, who was originally a schoolteacher (or pundit). His accomplishments were so remarkable that the whole group of around twenty native explorers became known as the Pundits. Two of the most famous pundits included the cousins Nain Singh and Kishen Singh (code-named A.K.)

== Great Trigonometric Survey of India ==
One of the greatest projects of 19th century geography was the Great Trigonometrical Survey of India. The British also wanted geographical information on the lands further north. This was not just out of scientific curiosity: the Russians were attempting to expand their empire into Central Asia, and the British feared that they might have set their eyes on gaining the riches of India, which was at that time a British colony. Thus, the Russians and the British both tried to extend their influence in Asia. Knowledge of geography of the region was important in the Great Game.

However, in some regions these surveys were difficult. Some of the Indian border countries, in particular Tibet, would not allow westerners to enter their country, let alone a British surveying team. In the 1860s, Thomas George Montgomerie, a captain in the survey, realised that the solution to this problem would be to train natives from Indian border states such as Sikkim to be surveyors, and have them explore the region. These would raise less suspicion than Europeans, and might be able to make observations disguised as a trader or a lama (holy man). These native surveyors are called pundits. One such pundit, Kinthup, was the first person to discover that the Tsangpo River was a tributary of the Brahmaputra – until that time it was not known whether it flowed to the Pacific or Indian Oceans.

=== Methods ===
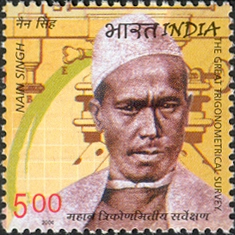
Nain Singh Rawat

A number of tricks were developed to enable the pundits to make their observations without being found out. They were trained on pacing, "to walk at precisely two thousand paces to the mile." To count them, they used a modified loop of prayer beads used in Buddhism, called a mala, but instead of the usual 108 beads it had 100, every tenth being slightly larger. Every 100 paces a bead was dropped. A prayer wheel did not hold the common Buddhist mantra Om mani padme hum, instead, "the scroll hidden within ... was replaced by a blank roll of paper upon which data could be surreptitiously recorded." Pundit Nain Singh Rawat also found that these could be used to ward off curious co-travelers: each time someone came too near, he would start whirling the wheel around and pretend to be in religious contemplation. Usually this would be enough to stop others from addressing him. Another way of keeping their observations was to turn them into a poem, and recite that during their travels.

The pundits were given extensive training in basic surveying: they learned to use the sextant, determine altitude by measuring the temperature of boiling water, and make astronomical observations. They also received some medical training. Through their exploration efforts, they managed to bring back vital data that allowed the mapping of areas lying north of India (which were forbidden to Europeans, such as Tibet) with remarkable precision.

== Notable pundits ==
An extensive list of the pundits (and their forerunners) has been detailed chronologically by Michael Ward in the Alpine Journal Volume 103, 1998. (His entry for 1858 is incorrect – Bir and Deb Singh were with William Moorcroft in 1812.) Some notable pundits include:

- Abdul Mejid
- Abdul Hamid
- Hari Ram
- Hyder Shah
- Kinthup
- Kishen Singh
- Mirza Shuja
- Nain Singh
- Sarat Chandra Das

== In literature ==
The use of pundits by the British during the Great Game is fictionalized in the 1901 novel Kim by Rudyard Kipling.
