= Hyder Shah =

British Indian Army soldier

Hyder Shah was a member of the British Indian Army who in 1870 traveled as a secret agent through the princely states of Swat and Dir and Badakhshan.

== 1870 expedition ==
Hyder Shah was a Pashtun Muslim from the town of Kohat south of Peshawar. Hyder Shah was known in British literature as "the Havildar", an alias derived from his rank, havildar, or sepoy noncommissioned officer in the Bengal Sappers and Miners. He was recruited for a mission to explore Central Asia by a Major Pollock, the Commissioner of Peshawar, while he was in the services of Lieutenant-Colonel Frederick Maunsell, commandant of the Sappers and Miners. Hyder Shah's direct commander during the mission was Thomas George Montgomerie, who was in charge of recruiting and sending spies into Xinjiang, Bukhara, and Badakhshan. Montgomerie ordered Hyder Shah to travel north from Peshawar through Swat and Dir to Chitral and then cross the Hindu Kush into Badakhshan. From Badakhshan he was to attempt to pass over the Oxus River and explore Bukhara and Kokand. On 12 August 1870 Hyder Shah and several assistants left Peshawar. They passed through Swat, Dir and Chitral and passed into Badakhshan. But at Faizabad they learned poor weather would not permit passage over the Oxus and therefore the plans to travel to Bukhara and Kokand were scuttled. Hyder Shah and his party retraced their route and on 13 December 1870 they returned to Peshawar.

In 1872 Montgomerie published an account of Hyder Shah's travels in the Journal of the Royal Geographical Society.
