= Thomas George Montgomerie =

British Army officer and surveyor

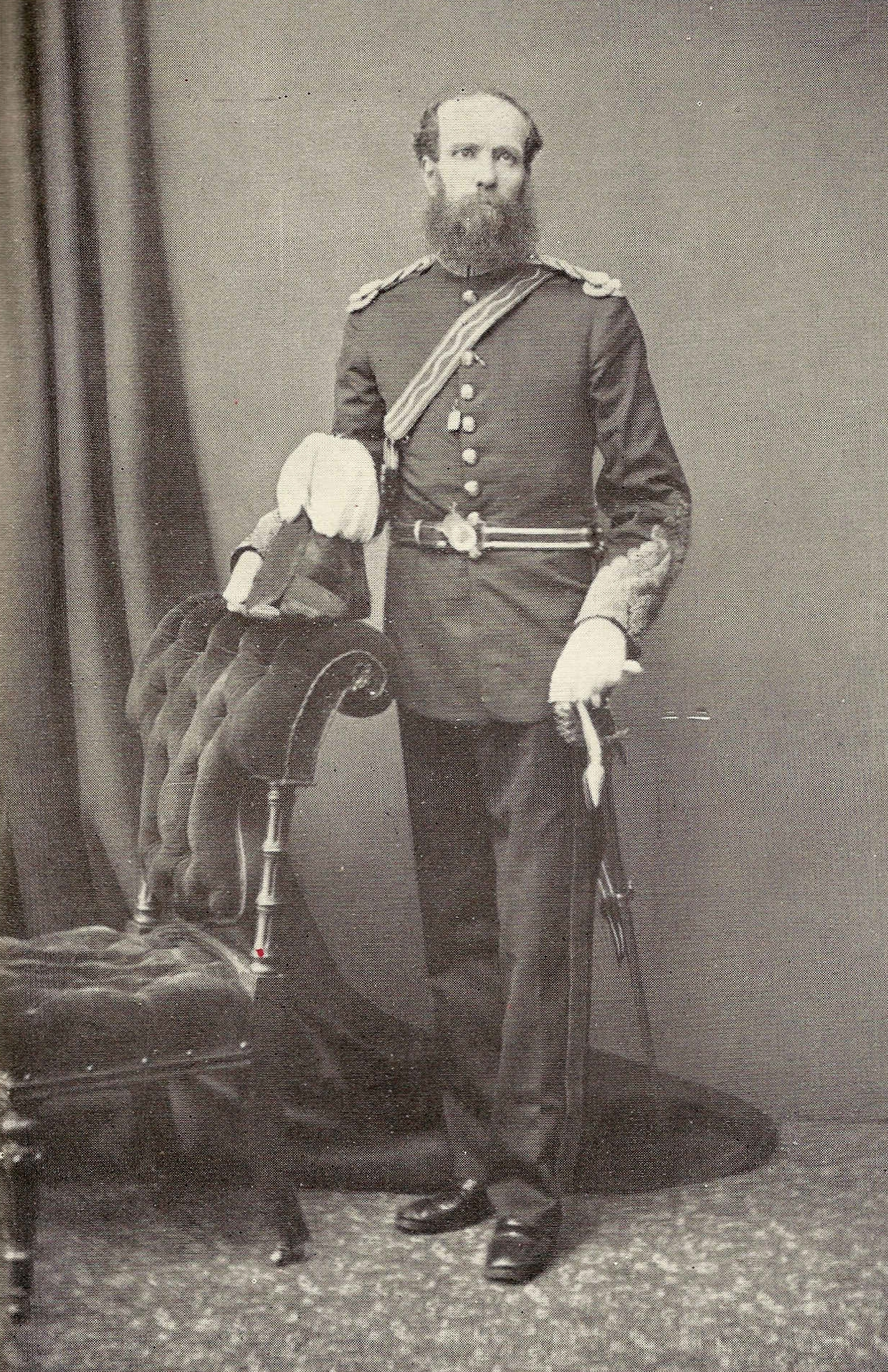

Lieutenant-Colonel Thomas George Montgomerie FRS (1830 – 1878) was a British army officer and surveyor who participated in the Great Trigonometrical Survey of British India as a lieutenant in the 1850s. He was the person to label K2, the second highest mountain in the world, the K standing for Karakoram.

Despite being often denied close range access, the 19th-century survey work carried out by Montgomerie and the survey of India has been shown to be accurate. The elevations of major summits which they calculated are very close to the elevations which are accepted today. Following the Kabuli Abdul Mejid's successful mission from Peshawar to Kokand in 1860, part of this accuracy was due to Montgomerie's increased use of native Indian pundits to undertake thorough observations in areas otherwise inaccessible to the British such as Tibet. Montgomerie oversaw the Indian pundits' training, which allowed some of them to disguise themselves as Tibetans and to use various hidden devices to undertake surveying and observations of latitude, longitude, and elevation while in the country.

In 1867 Major Montgomerie was assigned to Peshawar where he was tasked with recruiting native agents to explore Central Asia. Montgomerie recruited a number of individuals to survey Chitral and Badakhshan, including Hyder Shah, who in 1870 travelled through the princely states of Swat and Dir and Badakhshan.

== List of publications ==
- T. G. Montgomerie, "A Havildar's Journey through Chitral to Faizabad in 1870," Journal of the Royal Geographical Society of London. vol. 42, 1872, pp. 180–201
- Lieut.-Col. T. G. Montgomerie, "Journey to Shigatze, in Tibet and Return by Dingri-Maidan into Nepaul in 1871, by the native Explorer No. 9" Journal of the Royal Geographical Society of London, 1876
- Lieut.-Col. T. G. Montgomerie, "Narrative of an Exploration of the Namcho, or Tengri nur Lake in Great Tibet made by a native Explorer during 1871–2" Journal of the Royal Geographical Society of London, 1876
- Lieut.-Col. T. G. Montgomerie, "Journey from Pitoragarh, In Kumaon, via Jumlah, to Tadum and back, along the Kali Gandak to British Territory" Journal of the Royal Geographical Society of London, 1876
