= Dahana, Khatlon =

Dahana
- Village and jamoat
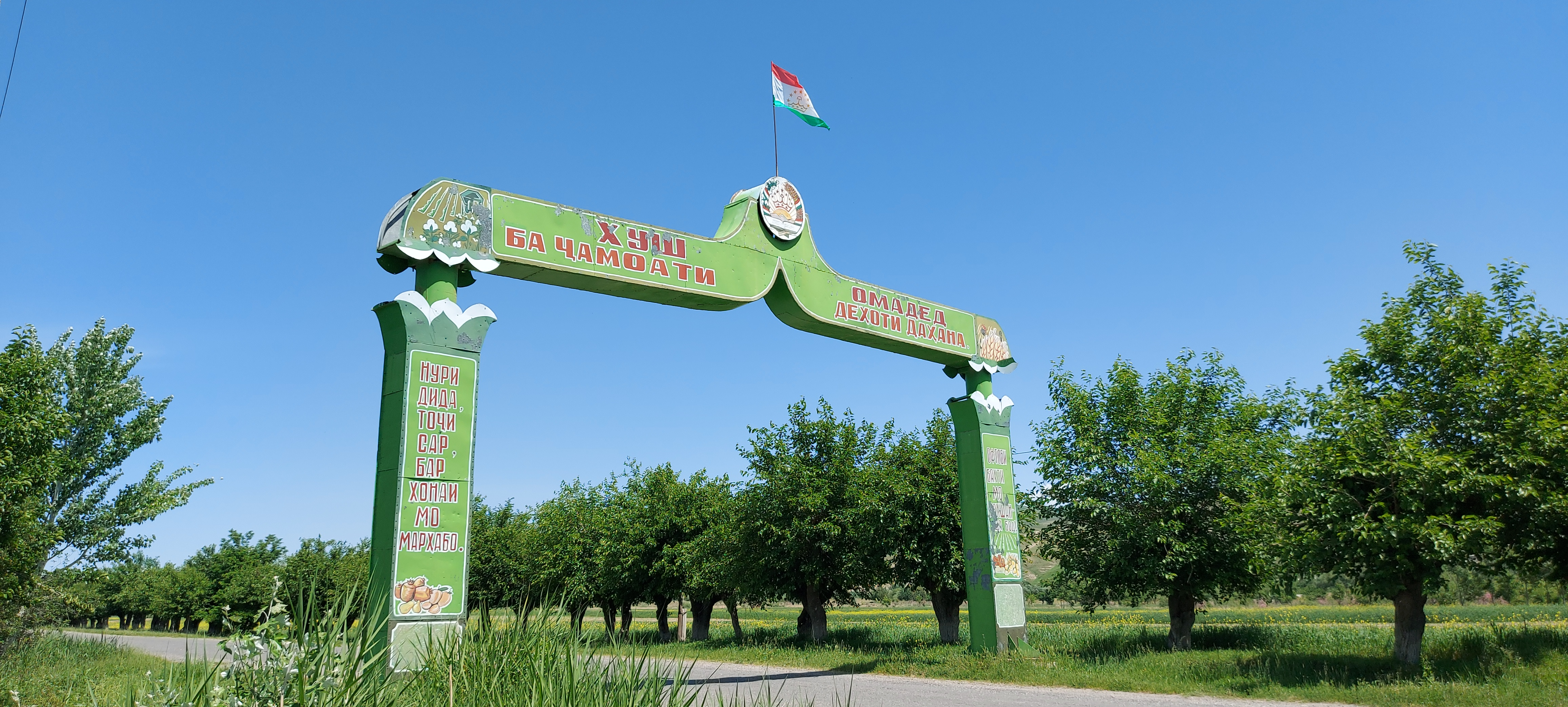

- Location in Tajikistan
- Coordinates: 38°03′30″N 069°52′00″E
- Country: Tajikistan
- Region: Khatlon Region
- City: Kulob

Population (2015)
  - Total: 29,776
- Time zone: UTC+5 (TJT)
- Official languages: Russian (Interethnic); Tajik (State)

Dahana (Tajik: Ҷамоати Даҳана) is a village and a jamoat (rural municipality) in Tajikistan, in central Asia. It is part of the city of Kulob in Khatlon Region. The jamoat has a total population of 29,776 (2015). Its administrative seat is in the village of Dahana.

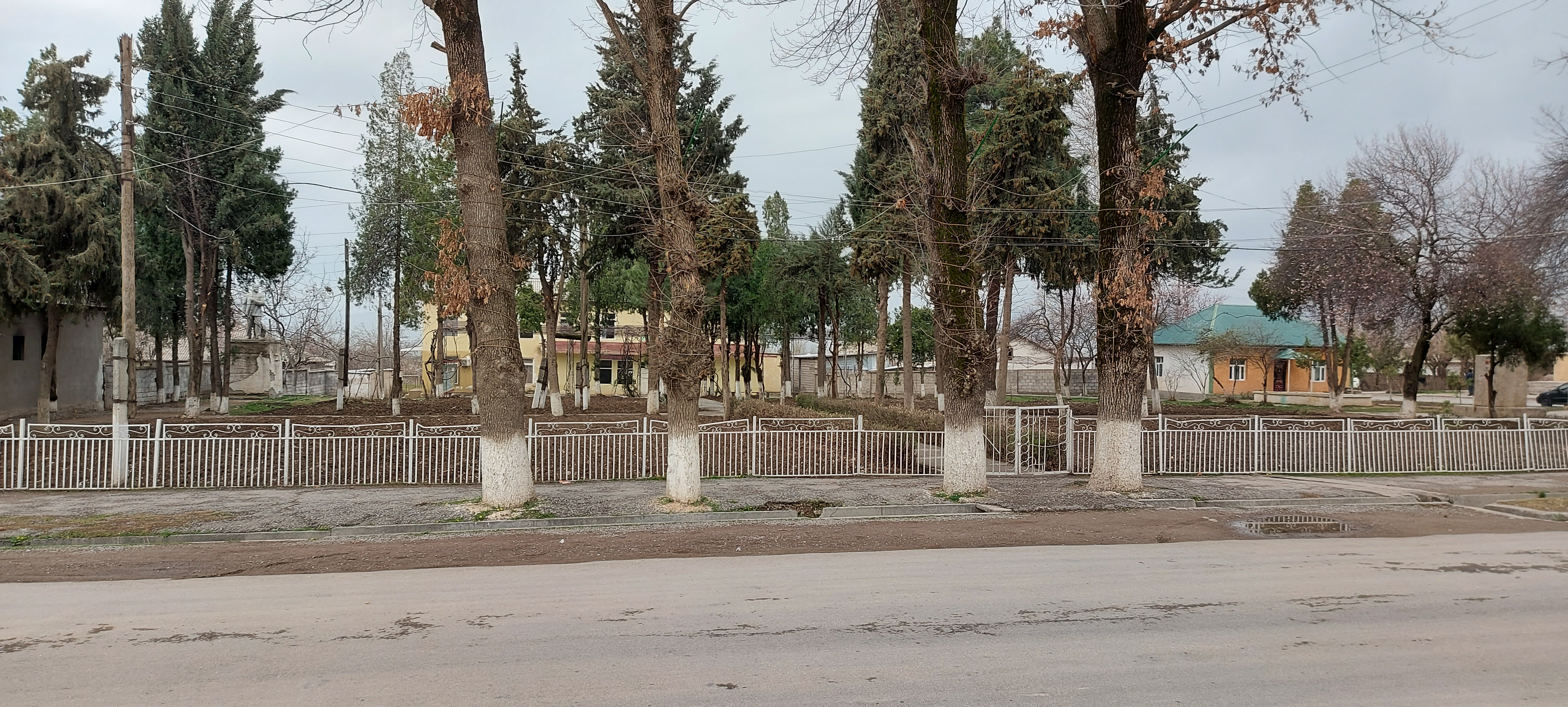
Jamoat Dahana

The area is almost entirely agricultural, crops and livestock. The farmers utilize the water from the river Yakhsu for irrigation. There is some artisanal mining.

Dahana Jamoat suffers from periodic flooding. In May 2010 unusual heavy precipitation triggered avalanches, floods, mud and rock flows, and landslides throughout Kulob District. On 7 May 2010, in Yokhsuchiyon village, mudflows completely destroyed the school building.

The climate is arid, and the main sectors of the community's economy are cotton, fruit and vegetables, livestock, and grain. The community's lands are irrigated by the Yahsu River and the Dahana River.

The rural community has libraries, houses of culture, mosques, markets for consumer goods, many service facilities, vocational and technical lyceums of agricultural industry, kindergartens, health centers, secondary schools, bank branches, repair shops, small ironworks aqueous, is an oily substance.
