= Shabnam Surayyo =

Shabnam Surayo Шабнами Сурайё (Tajik)
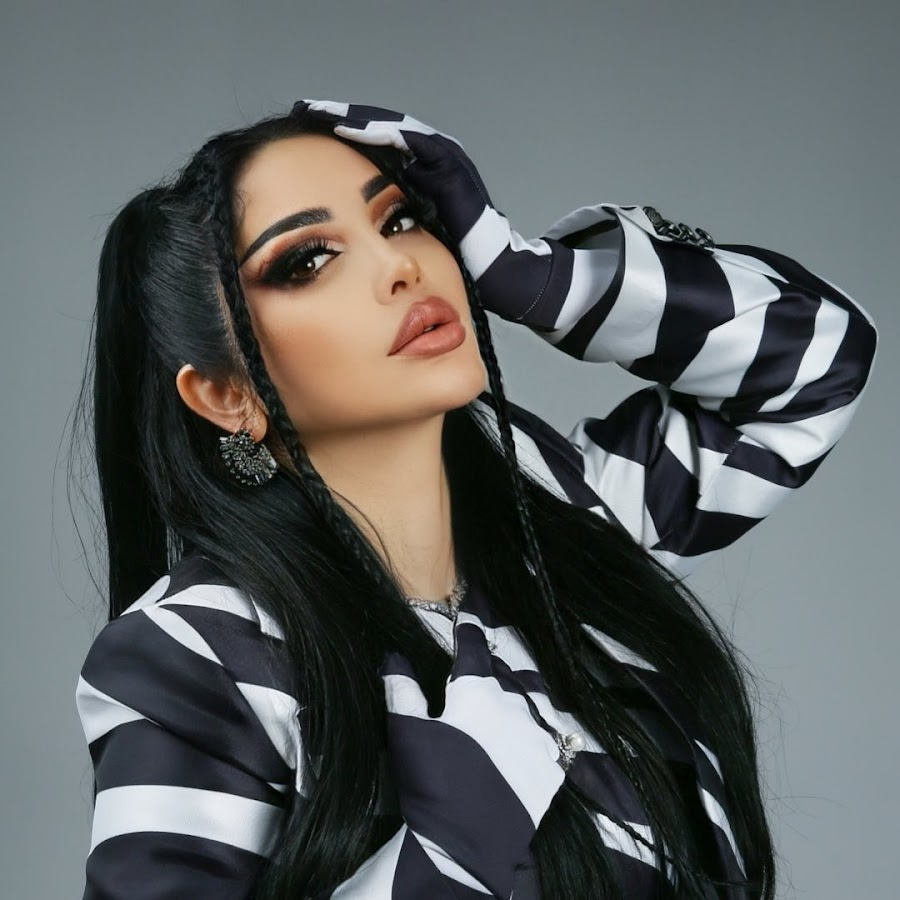

Background information
- Born: 27 October 1981 (age 44); Kulob, Tajik SSR, Soviet Union (present Tajikistan)
- Genres: Pop, dance
- Occupation: Singer
- Instrument: Vocals
- Years active: 2004–present
- Label: various

Shabnam Surayo (Note: also spelled as Surayyo, Suraya, or Soraya) (Tajik: Шабнами Сурайё, romanized: Šabnam Soraya) is a Tajik singer, notable for her unique musical style and collaborations with other artists, both Tajik and foreign.

== Biography ==
Surayo was born into a musical family, with both her mother Surayyo Qosimova and sister Farzonai Khurshed being singers in Tajikistan.

In 2006, one of her singles was ranked No.1 in her country. She is popular in Afghanistan, both working with their singers, and covering their songs, either with the original artists or by their permission. For example, her duets with Jawid Sharif, Afghan Queen Aryana Sayeed, and Najib Nawabi. Her song with Yulduz Usmonova, "Tarolla Dalli", boosted her recognition in Uzbekistan as well.

Shabnam also collaborated with Afghan singer Jawid Sharif on a duet called "Ey Khuda". In addition, she has also performed duets with other famous Tajik singers such as Suhrobi Safarzod, Parvina Shukrulloeva, Shabnami Sobiri and others. She also sang in Leila Forouhar’s concert in Tajikistan in 2006.

Her appearance in the Tuti Gala, held in America, boosted her recognition. She performed some of her most famous songs, including "Biyo Ki Burem Bagh", "Bizan Dutora", and "Eshq".

== Personal life ==
Shabnam is married to Kholid Zohir, with whom she has a daughter, Sharifamoh.
