= The Geographical Journal =

- June 2025 cover
- Discipline: Geography
- Language: English

Publication details
- History: 1831–present
- Publisher: Wiley-Blackwell on behalf of the Royal Geographical Society (United Kingdom)
- Frequency: Quarterly
- Impact factor: 2.676 (2019)

Standard abbreviations
- ISO 4: Geogr. J.

Indexing
- ISSN: 0016-7398 (print); 1475-4959 (web)
- OCLC no.: 781786946

Links
- Journal homepage; Online access; Online archive

The Geographical Journal is a quarterly peer-reviewed academic journal of the Royal Geographical Society (with the Institute of British Geographers). It publishes papers covering research on all aspects of geography. It also publishes shorter Commentary papers and Review Essays. Since 2001, The Geographical Journal has been published in collaboration with Wiley-Blackwell. The journal dates back to two related publications established in the 19th century, Journal of the Royal Geographical Society of London (published from 1831 to 1880), and Proceedings of the Royal Geographical Society of London , published from 1857 to 1877. Then Proceedings of the Royal Geographical Society and Monthly Record of Geography, published from 1879 to 1892, continued and absorbed the previous journals. In 1893, the journal renamed itself The Geographical Journal.

Prior to 2000, The Geographical Journal published society news alongside articles and it continues to publish the proceedings of the society's annual general meeting and presidential address in the September issue.
