= 2010 Tajik parliamentary election =

← 2005	28 February 2010	2015 →
- All 63 seats in the Assembly of Representatives; 32 seats needed for a majority
- Turnout: 90.32% (▼2.27pp)
Party	Leader	Vote %	Seats	+/–
PDP	Emomali Rahmon	71.04	54	+5
PRIT	Muhiddin Kabiri	8.22	2	0
Communist	Shodi Shabdolov	7.01	2	−2
Agrarian	Amir Qaroqulov	5.11	2	New
PERT	Olimzhon Boboyev	5.06	2	New
Independents	–	–	1	−4
This lists parties that won seats. See the complete results below.

Parliamentary elections were held in Tajikistan on 28 February 2010 alongside local elections. A second round in one constituency held on 14 March. The result was a victory for President Emomali Rahmon's People's Democratic Party (PDP), which won 54 of the 63 seats. However, all parties with the exception of the Islamic Renaissance Party were considered supporters of the regime.

== Electoral system ==
Of the 63 seats in the Assembly of Representatives, 41 were elected by majority vote in single-member constituencies. If no candidate received a majority of the vote in the first round, a second round was held. A second round was also held in cases where voter turnout was lower than 50% in the first round. The remaining 22 seats were elected by proportional representation at the national level, with parties having to cross a 5% threshold to win seats.

Prior to the elections the Communist Party had proposed abolishing the 7,000 somoni ($1,600) deposit required by candidates, arguing that it was too high. However, it remained in place.

A total of 221 candidates contested the election representing eight parties.

== Conduct ==
Whilst OSCE stated that the election had had "a generally good atmosphere", international observers stated the election had "failed on many basic democratic standards", with widespread electoral fraud occurring. This included ballot box stuffing and proxy voting.

In the run-up to the elections, state media had focused on the electricity policies of the PDP government. The Communist Party stressed social justice issue, focussing on education, medical care and "old age with dignity".

== Results ==
Party	National			Constituency			Total seats	+/–
Party	Votes	%	Seats	Votes	%	Seats	Total seats	+/–
People's Democratic Party	2,321,436	71.04	16			38	54	+5
Islamic Renaissance Party	268,596	8.22	2			0	2	0
Communist Party	229,080	7.01	2			0	2	–2
Agrarian Party	166,935	5.11	1			1	2	New
Party of Economic Reforms	165,324	5.06	1			1	2	New
Democratic Party	33,657	1.03	0			0	0	0
Social Democratic Party	27,006	0.83	0			0	0	New
Socialist Party	18,029	0.55	0			0	0	0
Independents						1	1	–4
Against all	37,597	1.15	–				–	–
Total	3,267,660	100.00	22			41	63	0
Valid votes	3,267,660	99.34						
Invalid/blank votes	21,710	0.66						
Total votes	3,289,370	100.00						
Registered voters/turnout	3,641,778	90.32						
Source: OCSE

In the Konibodom constituency a second round was required. This was held on 14 March, and was won by the PDP.
