= List of political parties in Tajikistan =

This article lists political parties in Tajikistan. Tajikistan is a one party dominant state with the People's Democratic Party of Tajikistan in power. Opposition parties are allowed, but are widely considered to have no real chance of gaining power.

== Parties represented in Parliament ==
Name	Abbr.	Est.	Leader	Ideology	Political position	Majlisi namoyandagon
People's Democratic Party of Tajikistan; Ҳизби халқии демократии Тоҷикистон; Народная демократическая партия Таджикистана	PDPT; ҲХДТ; НДПТ	1994	Emomali Rahmon	Tajikistani nationalism; Secularism	Centre-right	49 / 63
Agrarian Party of Tajikistan; Ҳизби аграрии Тоҷикистон; Аграрная партия Таджикистана	APT; ҲАТ; АПТ	2004	Rustam Latifzoda	Agrarianism	Centre	7 / 63
Party of Economic Reforms; Ҳизби ислоҳоти иқтисодии Тоҷикистон; Партия экономических реформ Таджикистана	PERT; ҲИИТ; ПЭРТ	2005	Rustam Kudratov	Social liberalism; Third Way; Agrarian reformism	Centre-left	5 / 63
Democratic Party; Ҳизби демократии Тоҷикистон; Демократическая партия Таджикистана	DPT; ҲДТ; ДПТ	1990	Masud Sobirov	Liberal conservatism; Secularism; Pan-Iranism	Centre-right	1 / 63
Socialist Party of Tajikistan; Ҳизби Сотсиалистии Тоҷикистон; Социалистическая партия Таджикистана	SPT; ҲСТ; СПТ	1996	Abduhalim Ghafarov	Socialism; Democratic socialism; Anti-clericalism	Left-wing	1 / 63

== Parties not represented in Parliament ==
- Communist Party of Tajikistan (Hizʙi kommunistii Toçikiston)
- Justice Party (Hizbi Adolatkhoh)
- Lali Badakhshan
- Social Democratic Party (Hizbi Sotsial-Demokratii Tojikiston)

== Banned parties ==
Party	Abbr.	Ideology	Political position	Leader	Years active
Islamic Renaissance Party of Tajikistan; Ҳизби Наҳзати Исломии Тоҷикистон	IRPT	Islamism; Anti-communism		Muhiddin Kabiri	1990–2015
Islamic Movement of Uzbekistan; Ҳаракати исломии Узбакистон	IMU	Islamism; Pan-Islamism; Salafi Jihadism; Anti-Zionism; Historical: Anti-Islam Karimov		Tohir Yoʻldosh †; Juma Namangani †; Abu Usman Adil †; Usman Ghazi †; Samatov Mamasoli (noms de guerre: Abu Ali) (POW)	1 August 1998 – 6 August 2015 13 June 2016 – 2023 (split factions)
Hizb ut-Tahrir; Партия ва озод шудан	HT	Pan-Islamism; Islamism; Muslim supremacism; Caliphalism; Salafism; Jihadism; Desecularization; Anti-Western sentiment; Anti-nationalism; Antisemitism; Anti-Zionism; Anti-democracy; Anti-liberalism; Anti-capitalism; Anti-communism	Far-right	Ata Abu Rashta	1992–2007

- Forum of Tajik Freethinkers
- Reforms and Development in Tajikistan
- Association of Central Asian Migrants

== See also ==
- Politics of Tajikistan
- List of political parties by country
