= Elections in Tajikistan =

Tajikistan elects on the national level a head of state – the president – and a legislature. The president is elected for a seven-year term by the people. The Supreme Assembly (Majlisi Oli) has two chambers. The Assembly of Representatives (Majlisi Namoyandogan) has 63 members, elected for a five-year term in, 22 by proportional representation and 41 in single-seat constituencies. The National Assembly (Majlisi Milliy) has 33 members, 25 elected for a five-year term by local majlisi deputies and eight appointed by the president. Tajikistan is a one-party dominant system with the People's Democratic Party of Tajikistan in power.

== Latest elections ==
=== 2025 Parliamentary election ===
Party	Votes	%	Seats			
Party	Votes	%	Constituency	Party list	Total	+/–
People's Democratic Party	2,435,541	52.45	37	12	49	+2
Agrarian Party of Tajikistan	986,887	21.25	2	5	7	0
Party of Economic Reforms	595,281	12.82	2	3	5	0
Socialist Party of Tajikistan	248,064	5.34	0	1	1	0
Democratic Party of Tajikistan	237,536	5.11	0	1	1	0
Communist Party of Tajikistan	89,738	1.93	0	0	0	–2
Against all	50,895	1.10	–	–	–	–
Total	4,643,942	100.00	41	22	63	0
Valid votes	4,643,942	98.54				
Invalid/blank votes	69,025	1.46				
Total votes	4,712,967	100.00				
Registered voters/turnout	5,522,038	85.35				
Source: The Times of Central Asia, Interfax

=== 2020 Presidential election ===
A foregone conclusion, incumbent president Rahmon won re-election, allegedly with over 90% of the vote. Just as with prior elections, the election was not deemed to be free or fair.

Candidate	Party	Votes	%
Emomali Rahmon	People's Democratic Party	3,853,987	92.08
Rustam Latifzoda	Agrarian Party	128,182	3.06
Rustam Rahmatzoda	Party of Economic Reforms	90,918	2.17
Abduhalim Ghafforov	Socialist Party	63,082	1.51
Miroj Abdulloyev	Communist Party	49,535	1.18
Total		4,185,704	100.00
Valid votes		4,185,704	98.75
Invalid/blank votes		53,135	1.25
Total votes		4,238,839	100.00
Registered voters/turnout		4,943,289	85.75
Source: CEC, Khovar

== See also ==
- Electoral calendar
- Electoral system
