= 2015 Tajik parliamentary election =

- 1 March 2015
- All 63 seats in the Assembly of Representatives; 32 seats needed for a majority
Party	Leader	Vote %	Seats	+/–
PDP	Emomali Rahmon	67.03	51	−3
Agrarian	Amir Qaroqulov	11.95	5	+3
PERT	Olimzhon Boboyev	7.66	3	+1
Socialist	Abduhalim Ghafforov	5.59	1	+1
Communist	Shodi Shabdolov	2.28	2	0
Democratic	Saidjafar Usmonzoda	1.75	1	+1
This lists parties that won seats. See the complete results below.

Parliamentary elections were held in Tajikistan on 1 March 2015.

== Electoral system ==
The 63 members of the Assembly of Representatives were elected by two methods: 41 members were elected in single-member constituencies using the two-round system, whilst 22 seats were elected by proportional representation in a single nationwide constituency, with an electoral threshold of 5%.

== Campaign ==
A total of 288 candidates contested the elections.

== Conduct ==
The Organization for Security and Co-operation in Europe sent observers to the elections. None of the elections in Tajikistan since 1992 were judged either free or fair by international observers.

== Results ==
Party	PR			Constituency			Total seats	+/–
Party	Votes	%	Seats	Votes	%	Seats	Total seats	+/–
People's Democratic Party	2,528,060	67.03	16			35	51	–3
Agrarian Party	450,822	11.95	3			2	5	+3
Party of Economic Reforms	289,006	7.66	2			1	3	+1
Socialist Party	210,677	5.59	1			0	1	+1
Communist Party	86,060	2.28	0			2	2	0
Democratic Party	65,816	1.75	0			1	1	+1
Islamic Renaissance Party	63,161	1.67	0			0	0	–2
Social Democratic Party	19,676	0.52	0			0	0	0
Independents						0	0	–1
Against all	58,081	1.54	–				–	–
Total	3,771,359	100.00	22			41	63	0
Valid votes	3,771,359	97.61						
Invalid/blank votes	92,525	2.39						
Total votes	3,863,884	100.00						
Registered voters/turnout	4,399,390	87.83						
Source: OSCE
