= Supreme Assembly (Tajikistan) =

Bicameral legislature of Tajikistan

Coordinates: 38.5739°N 68.7878°E

Supreme Assembly of the Republic of Tajikistan Маҷлиси Олии Ҷумҳурии Тоҷикистон (Tajik) Высшее собрание (Маджлиси Оли) Республики Таджикистан (Russian)
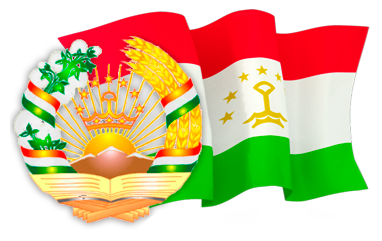

Type
- Type: Bicameral
- Houses: National Assembly; Assembly of Representatives

History
- Founded: 6 November 1994
- Preceded by: Supreme Soviet of the Republic of Tajikistan

Leadership
- Chairman of the National Assembly: Rustam Emomali since 28 March 2025
- Chairman of the Assembly of Representatives: Fayzali Idizoda, PDPT since 19 March 2025

Structure
- Seats: 96: 33 senators in the National Assembly; 63 deputies in the Assembly of Representatives
- National Assembly political groups: Independent (33)
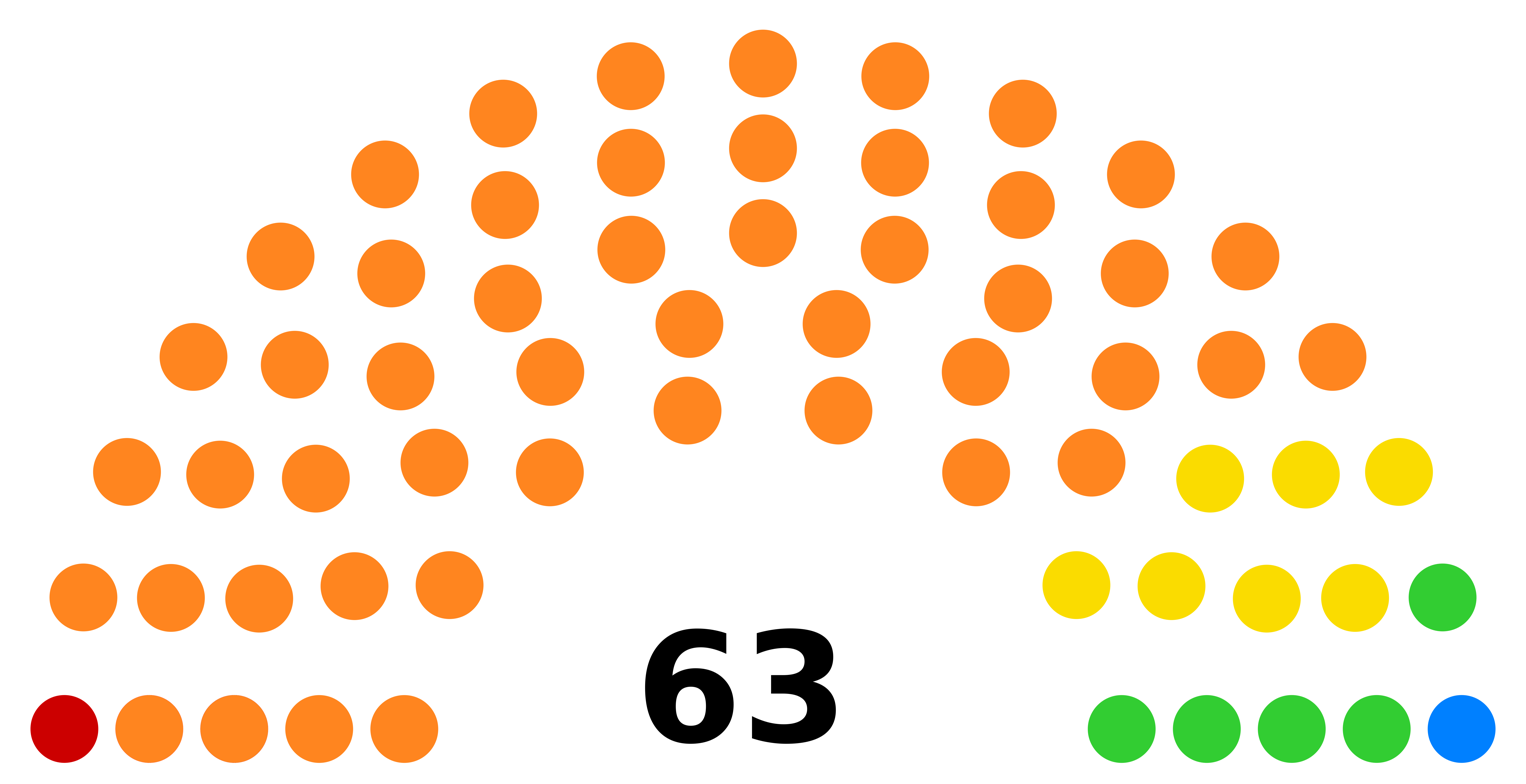
- Assembly of Representatives political groups: Government (49): People's Democratic Party (49); Pro-Government (7): Agrarian Party (7); Opposition (7): Party of Economic Reforms (5); Democratic Party (1); Socialist Party (1)

Elections
- National Assembly voting system: 25 seats chosen by deputies of regional assembly; 8 seats appointed by the President of Tajikistan
- Assembly of Representatives voting system: Mixed member majoritarian: Two-round system: 41 seats; Proportional representation with 5% electoral threshold: 22 seats
- First Assembly of Representatives election: 26 February 1995
- Last Assembly of Representatives election: 2 March 2025
- Next Assembly of Representatives election: 2030

Meeting place
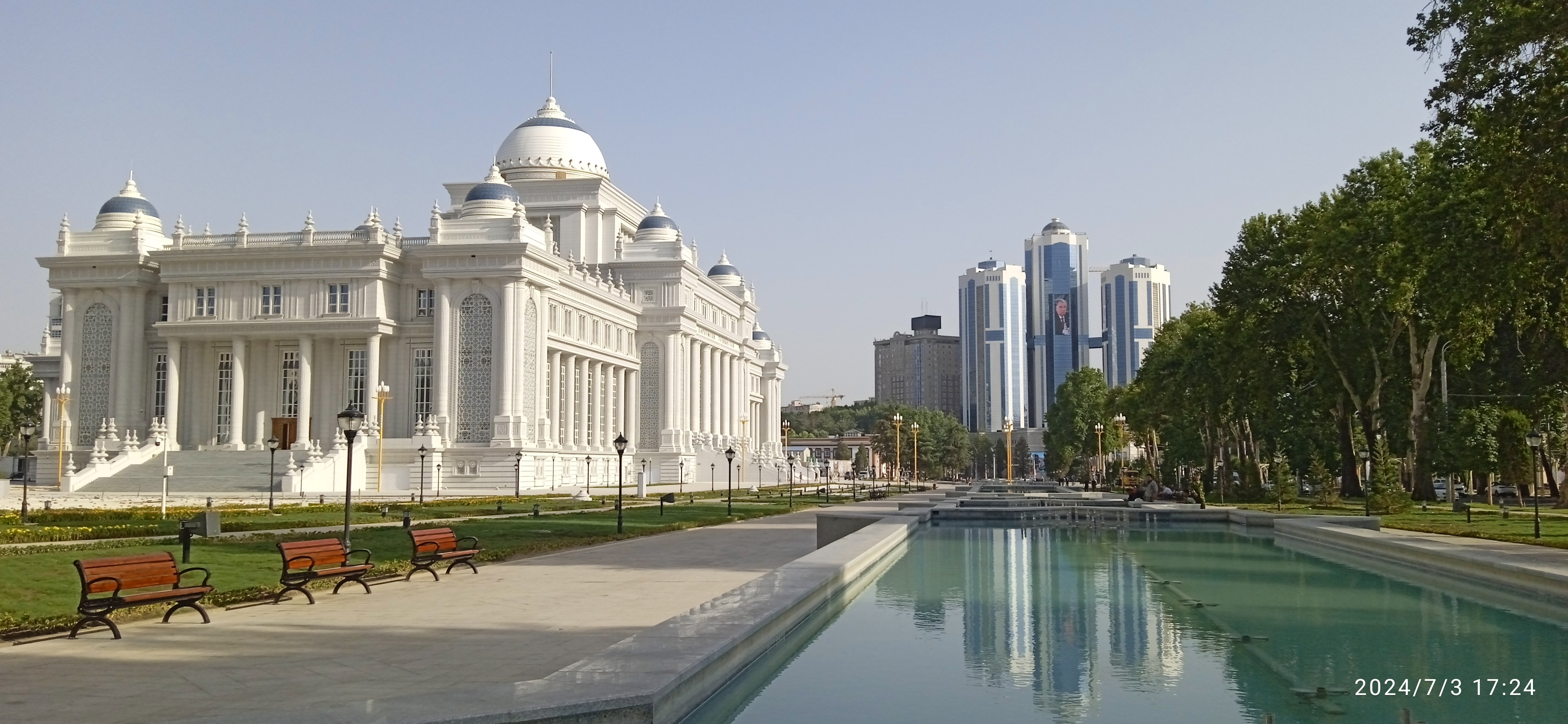

Website
- majmilli.tj; parlament.tj

The Supreme Assembly of the Republic of Tajikistan, (Note: Tajik: Маҷлиси Олии Ҷумҳурии Тоҷикистон, romanized: Majlisi Oliyi Jumhuriyi Tojikiston; Russian: Высшее собрание (Маджлиси Оли) Республики Таджикистан.) also known simply as the Majlisi Oli, is the parliament of Tajikistan.

== Chambers ==
It has two chambers:

- Assembly of Representatives (Majlisi namoyandagon), the lower chamber with 63 members elected for a five-year term, 22 by proportional representation and 41 in single-seat constituencies. The previous Chairman of the Majlisi namoyandagon was Saydullo Khayrulloyev who was elected on 27 March 2000. He was succeeded by Shukurjon Zuhurov on 16 March 2010. Currently Chairman Fayzali Idizoda who was elected on 19 March 2025.
- National Assembly (Majlisi milli), the upper chamber with 33 members, 25 elected for a five-year term by deputies of local majlisi and eight appointed by the president. The current Chairman of the Majlisi milli is Rustam Emomali since 17 April 2020.

The bicameral legislature was introduced in the September 1999 constitution. Prior to that, Tajikistan had a unicameral legislature called the Supreme Assembly from 1995, and a unicameral Supreme Soviet before 1995.

== Building ==
From 1991, the Majlisi Oli was headquartered in the former Supreme Soviet building on Dousti Square. Since 2024, it is headquartered in the new parliament palace on Rudaki Avenue. The Tajik-styled and Chinese-aided building, covering an area of 43,750 square meters, features a white marble facade and a 70-meter-high dome. It includes a great assembly hall with 1,500 seats, upper and lower chamber halls with 250 seats each, a press conference hall with 350 seats and many other rooms.

== Gallery ==
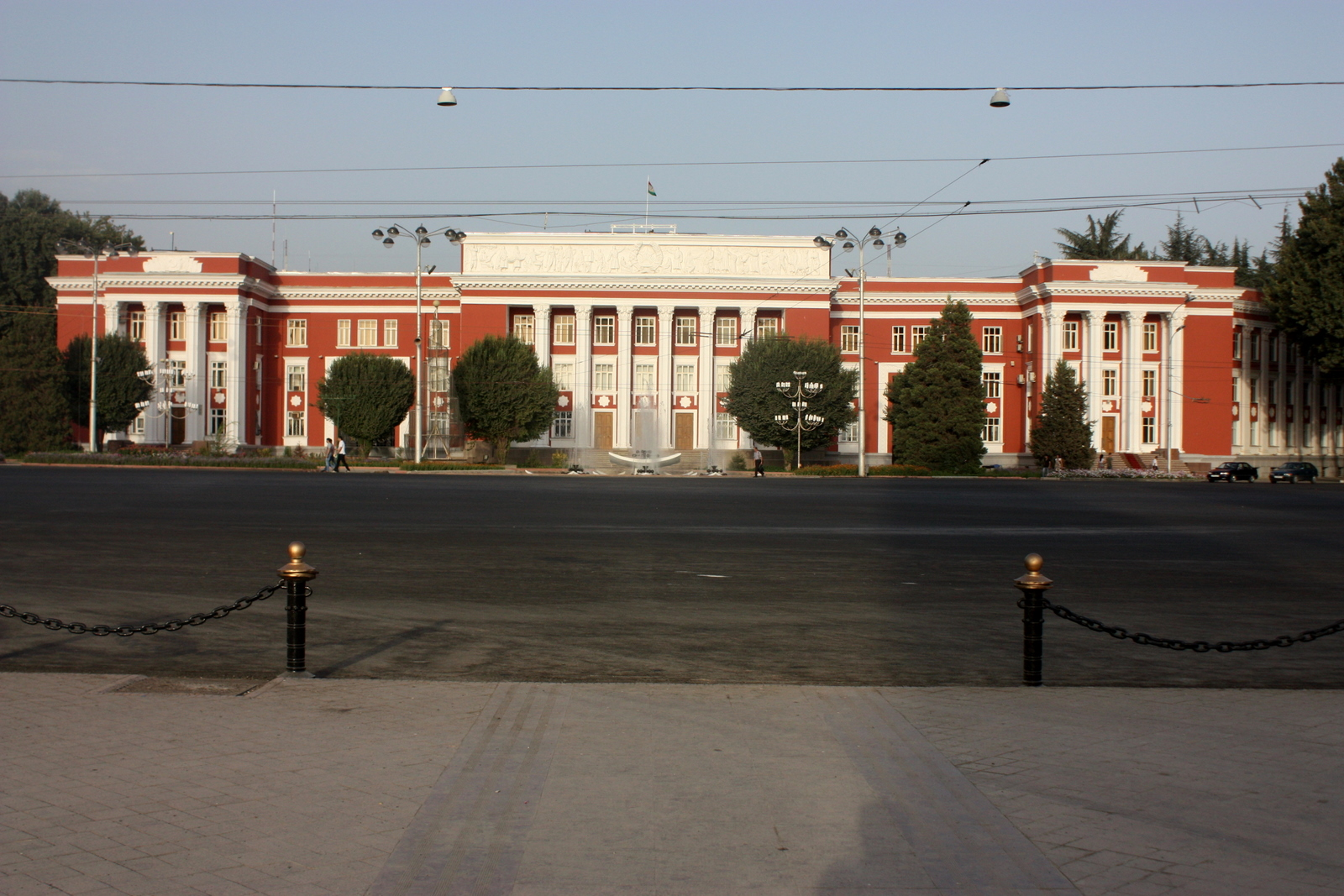
Old parliament building

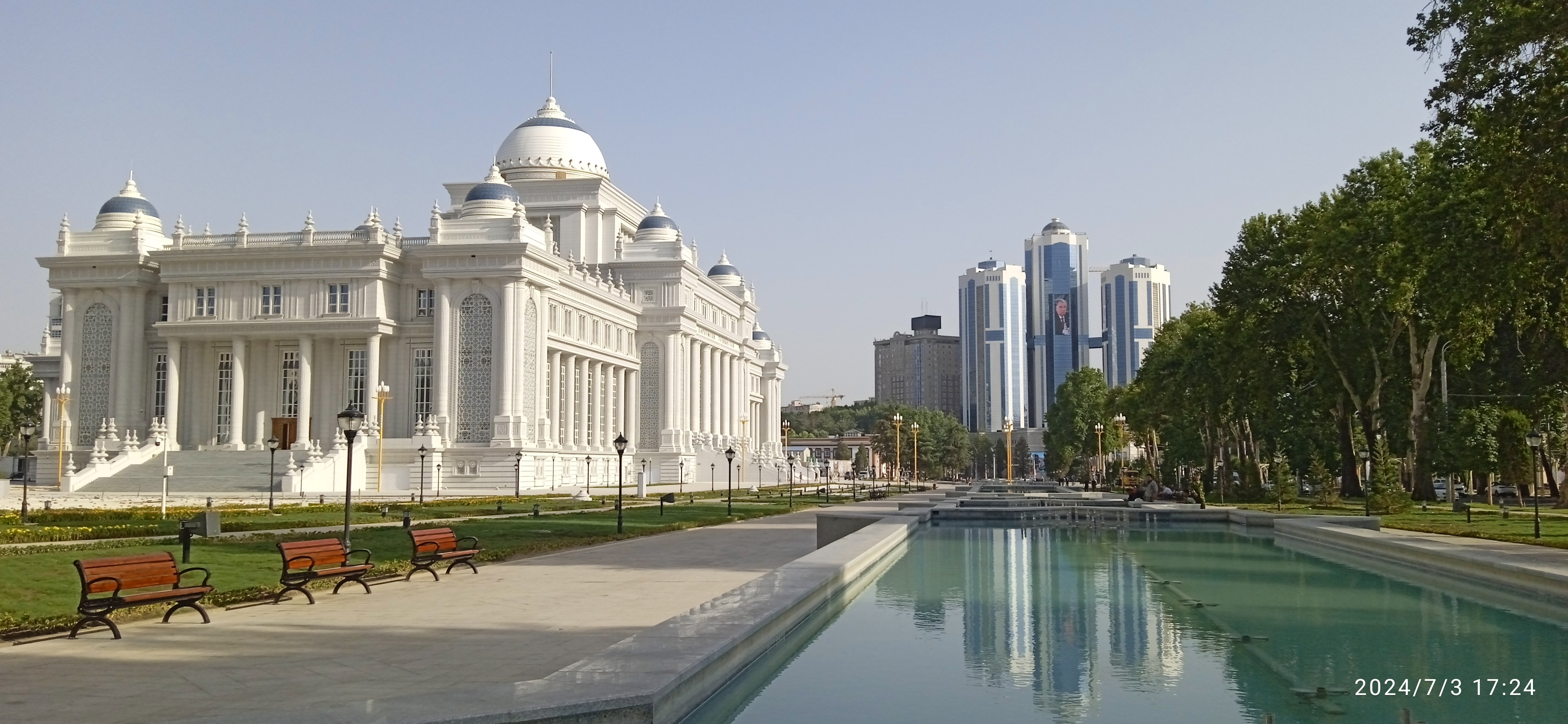
New parliament building

== See also ==
- List of Chairmen of the Supreme Soviet of the Tajik Soviet Socialist Republic
- Politics of Tajikistan
- List of legislatures by country
- List of political parties in Tajikistan
