= 1990 Tajik Supreme Soviet election =

← 1985	25 February 1990	1995 →

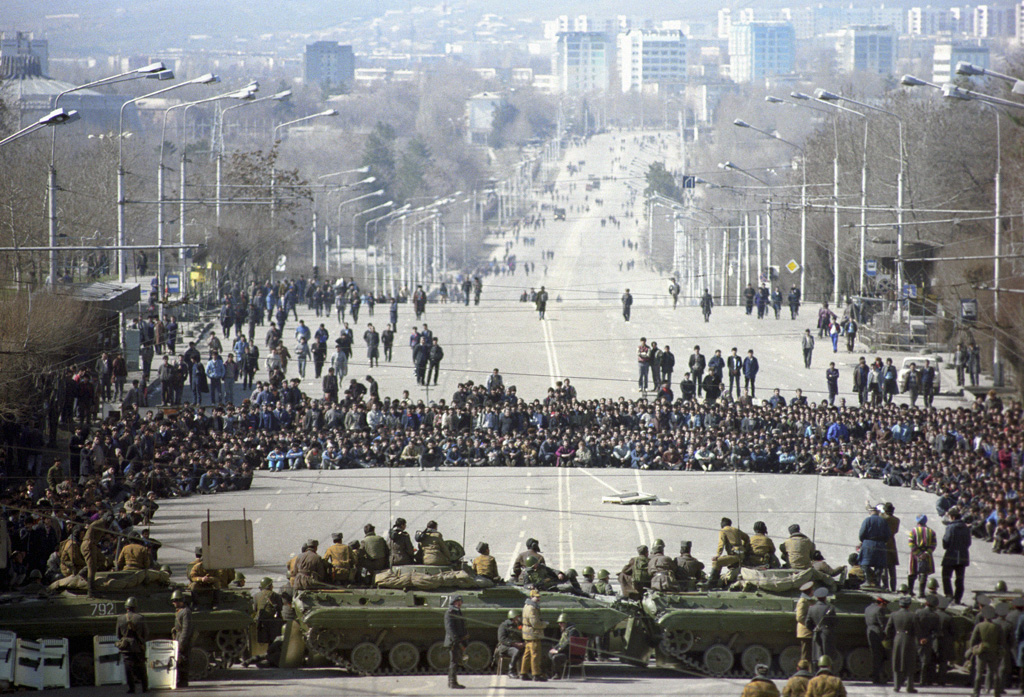
Riots in the center of Dushanbe on 15 February

Supreme Soviet elections were held in the Tajik SSR were held on 25 February 1990. A total of 230 deputies were elected to the Supreme Soviet. The Communist Party of the Tajik SSR was the only legal and registered party at the time of the elections; members of other parties including the Islamic Revival Party of Tajikistan and Rastokhez contested the elections as independent candidates.

== Background ==
The elections took place amid the 1990 Dushanbe riots, which had relatively subsided by election day. It was these riots that became some of the first sparks of the civil war, which lasted until 1997.

== Results ==
The Communist Party led by Qahhor Mahkamov won 96% of the seats. The ranks of the Communist Party included several de facto opposition candidates who entered the Supreme Soviet thanks to tough competition with other communists and numerous petitions and rallies of voters who monitored the voting process.

Independent candidates won the remaining 4% of the seats.

== Aftermath ==
After the independence of Tajikistan on 9 September 1991 the Supreme Soviet continued to function until the parliamentary election in 1995.
