= 2020 Tajik parliamentary election =

- 1 March 2020
- All 63 seats in the Assembly of Representatives; 32 seats needed for a majority
- Turnout: 86.44% (▼1.39pp)
Party	Leader	Vote %	Seats	+/–
PDP	Emomali Rahmon	51.21	47	−4
PERT	Rustam Qudratov	16.88	5	+2
Agrarian	Rustam Latifzoda	16.77	7	+2
Socialist	Abduhalim Ghafforov	5.23	1	0
Democratic	Saidjafar Usmonzoda	5.18	1	0
Communist	Miroj Abdulloyev	3.16	2	0
This lists parties that won seats. See the complete results below.

Parliamentary elections were held in Tajikistan on 1 March 2020. The result was a landslide victory for the ruling People's Democratic Party, which won 47 of the 63 seats. The only opposition party, the Social Democratic Party, received just 0.3% of the vote.

The Organization for Security and Co-operation in Europe was critical of the election.

== Electoral system ==
The 63 members of the Assembly of Representatives are elected by two methods: 41 members are elected in single-member constituencies using the two-round system, whilst 22 seats are elected by proportional representation in a single nationwide constituency, with an electoral threshold of 5%. Voters cast a single ballot for a candidate in their single-member constituency, with the total votes received across all constituencies used to determine the proportional seats. In each constituency, voter turnout is required to be at least 50% for the election to be declared valid.

== Campaign ==
A total of 241 candidates contested the elections, 65 for the 22 party-list seats and 176 for the 41 constituency seats.

The Islamic Renaissance Party of Tajikistan was unable to participate, having been banned by the authorities over terrorism allegations in 2015.

== Results ==
Party	Votes	%	Seats			
Party	Votes	%	Constituency	PR	Total	+/–
People's Democratic Party	2,139,741	51.21	35	12	47	–4
Party of Economic Reforms	705,252	16.88	1	4	5	+2
Agrarian Party	700,582	16.77	3	4	7	+2
Socialist Party	218,696	5.23	0	1	1	0
Democratic Party	216,526	5.18	0	1	1	0
Communist Party of Tajikistan	132,000	3.16	2	0	2	0
Social Democratic Party	13,735	0.33	0	0	0	0
Independents			0	0	0	0
Against all	52,030	1.25	–	–	–	–
Total	4,178,562	100.00	41	22	63	0
Total votes	4,260,951	–				
Registered voters/turnout	4,929,128	86.44				
Source: OSCE
