= Shukurjon Zuhurov =

Tajik politician (born 1954)

Shukurjon Zukhurovich Zuhurov
- Шукурҷон Зуҳуров
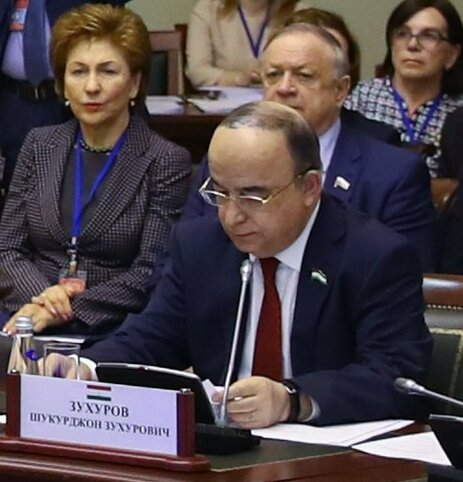
- Zuhurov in 2018

Chairman of the Assembly of Representatives of Tajikistan
- In office 16 March 2010 – 17 March 2020
- Preceded by: Saidullo Khairullaev
- Succeeded by: Mahmadtohir Zokirzoda

Personal details
- Born: 16 April 1954 Kirovobod District, Tajikistan SSR, Soviet Union
- Party: People's Democratic Party of Tajikistan
- Education: Moscow State University of Land Management

Shukurjon Zukhurovich Zuhurov (Tajik: Шукурҷон Зуҳуров; born 16 April 1954) is a Tajik politician who served as Chairman of the Assembly of Representatives of Tajikistan from 2010 to 2020. Zuhurov initially graduated from the Moscow State University of Land Management in 1976, before working with the Komsomol and the Komsomolabat District. After the fall of the Soviet Union, he became Minister of Labor and headed the first two rounds of the Inter-Tajik Dialogue during the Tajikistani Civil War.

== Early life ==
Zuhurov was born on 16 April 1954 in the Kirovobod District, which was then part of the Tajikistan SSR in the Soviet Union. He was bron into a Gharmi family. Zuhurov graduated from the Moscow State University of Land Management in 1976 with a specialization as a land management engineer. Afterwards, he started working as an engineer of land use in Qurghonteppa and Moskovskiy. Later on, in 1992, he graduated from the State University of Management.

== Career ==
In 1979, he moved to Dushanbe, where he became the Secretary of the Central Committee of the Komsomol of Tajikistan, where he also worked as an instructor. In 1986 he was appointed Chairman of the Executive Committee of the Council of People's Deputies in the Komsomolabat District. In 1991, he was then appointed Chair of the State Committee on Labor and Worker Cadre preparation after the fall of the Soviet Union. Sometime after this he became Head of the now-named Panj District and Deputy Head of the Executive Office. From 1993 to 1998 he was then served as Minister of Labor and Worker Cadre Preparation. During the Inter-Tajik Dialogue in the midst of the Tajikistani Civil War, Zuhurov was a participant. He was part of the early delegations in March 1994 in Moscow, according to Nezavisimaya Gazeta as the head of the permanent government delegation. He was again the head of the delegation in the second round of talks in Tehran. According to some analyses, putting him as the head of a delegation with such a low rank as the least significant of the Cabinet members showed the government's reluctant attitude towards the negotiations. He did not head the other rounds, and instead became a deputy of the Supreme Assembly until 2000.

In 1997, after the end of the talks and the resolution of the war, he was appointed Secretary of the Subcommittee on Refugees in the Commission for National Reconciliation, a position he held until 2000. At the same time, he held the post of Chairman of the Coordination Center for Post-War Reconstruction Projects. Simultaneously, from 1992 to 2005, he was Minister of Labor and Employment, and in December 2006 he became Minister of Labor and Social Protection of the Population after a restructuring of the ministry. Finally, in 2005, he was elected a member of the Assembly of Representatives of Tajikistan. He was re-elected in the 2010 elections, representing Rasht District's No. 12 seat. At the first meeting of the first session of the chamber he was elected chairman. He was re-elected to this post in March 2015, before resigning in 2020.

During his time as Chairman, it was known that he accused anti-corruption agencies and officials of being corrupt themselves, and that they needed to be brought to justice. Due to clashes over the Kyrgyzstan–Tajikistan border, Zuhurov met with representatives of Kyrgyzstan's parliament in 2019. He also stated that the country needed to remain a loyal ally of Russia, and accused outside forces and biased media outlets of twisting the relationship. During his time, however, the house slowly grew weaker, with some analysts saying the body had no impact.
