= 2005 Tajik parliamentary election =

- 27 February 2005 (first round); 13 March 2005 (second round)
- All 63 seats in the Assembly of Representatives; 32 seats needed for a majority
Party	Leader	Seats	+/–
PDP	Emomali Rahmonov	52	+16
Communist	Shodi Shabdolov	4	−9
Islamic Renaissance	Sayid Abdulloh Nuri	2	0
Independents	—N/a	5	−5
This lists parties that won seats. See the complete results below.

Parliamentary elections were held in Tajikistan on 27 February and 13 March 2005. The People's Democratic Party of Tajikistan, headed by President Emomali Rahmonov, won a 41-seat majority in the 63-seat Assembly of Representatives.

Independent election observers from the Organization for Security and Co-operation in Europe (OSCE) monitored the election at the request of the Tajik government. According to the mission's final report:

"The 2005 parliamentary elections in Tajikistan failed to meet many of the key OSCE commitments for democratic elections contained in the 1990 Copenhagen Document, and they were also not conducted fully in accordance with domestic law. Although some efforts were made to improve the legislative and administrative framework for democratic elections, a commensurate effort to ensure effective implementation was largely lacking. Therefore, despite some improvement over previous elections, large-scale irregularities were evident, particularly on [e]lection day."

== Results ==
Party	National			Constituency			Total seats	+/–
Party	Votes	%	Seats	Votes	%	Seats	Total seats	+/–
People's Democratic Party	1,666,909		49			3	52	+16
Communist Party of Tajikistan	395,534		4			0	4	–9
Islamic Renaissance Party	259,224		2			0	2	0
Democratic Party			0			0	0	0
Social Democratic Party			0			0	0	New
Socialist Party of Tajikistan			0			0	0	0
Independents			5			0	5	–5
Total			60			3	63	0
Valid votes	2,831,724	97.57		191,968	98.75			
Invalid/blank votes	70,592	2.43		2,423	1.25			
Total votes	2,902,316	100.00		194,391	100.00			
Registered voters/turnout	3,134,666	92.59		217,672	89.30			
Source: IPU, IFES
