= Rastokhez =

1989–1997 political party in Tajikistan

Popular Movement «Revival» Ҳаракати мардумии «Растохез»
- Founded: 14 September 1989
- Dissolved: 1997
- Ideology: Secular liberalism Liberal democracy Moderate nationalism Anti-communism
- Political position: Centre-right
- National affiliation: United Tajik Opposition

The Popular Movement «Revival», (Note: Tajik: Ҳаракати мардумии «Растохез», romanized: Harakati mardumiyi «Rastoxez»; Russian: Народное движение «Пробуждение») simply known as the Rastokhez (/ˌræstɒˈxɛz/; Tajik: [rɐstʰɔˈχez]), was a political party in Tajikistan in the years of independence and civil war (1989–1997). It was founded on 14 September 1989, by members of the Tajik intelligentsia, among them Tohir Abdujabbor, with a moderate nationalist, secularist and liberal democratic program.

== History ==
Its prominent position in the opposition to the ruling Communist Party of Tajikistan ensured that it became the main scapegoat for the Dushanbe riots of February 1990. The party was banned, which ensured total victory for the Communists in the upcoming elections.

During the next years and the Tajik Civil War, Rastokhez, then underground, as well as the similarly minded Democratic Party, participated in the United Tajik Opposition (UTO) along with more Islamic groups. The party ceased to exist at the same time as the UTO, its members having mostly joined the Democratic Party at the time of the peace treaty (June 1997).
