= Fayzali Idizoda =

Tajik politician (born 1977)

- Файзалӣ Идизода

Chairman of the Assembly of Representatives of Tajikistan
- Incumbent
- Assumed office March 19, 2025
- Preceded by: Mahmadtohir Zokirzoda

Personal details
- Born: Faizali Fuzailshovich Idiev; January 3, 1977 (age 49) Gharm District, Tajik SSR, Soviet Union
- Party: People's Democratic Party

Faizali Fuzailsho Idizoda (Tajik: Файзалӣ Фузайлшо Идизода, born 3 January 1977) is a politician from Tajikistan who has served as Chairman of Assembly of Representatives of Tajikistan since March 2025.

== Biography ==
Faizali Idizoda was born on January 3, 1977, in the Gharm District into an intellectual family. After graduating from Secondary School No. 3 in the Gharm district, he entered the full-time department of the Faculty of Law of the Tajik National University, graduating in 1998 with a degree in law.

He began his career as an investigator in the tax police department of the Rasht District. In 2001, he transferred to the prosecutor's office, and until 2008, he worked as an investigator in the military prosecutor's office of the Karotegin Region. In September 2008, he entered the full-time postgraduate department of the Department of International Law of the Institute of State and Law of the Russian Academy of Sciences and studied at this institution until July 2011.

On June 16, 2011, he defended his doctoral thesis on the topic "International and legal foundations of the participation of international organizations in resolving the armed conflict in Tajikistan".

== Academic work ==
After completing his studies, he taught international law and European law to students as an assistant and senior lecturer. On March 6, 2012, he was appointed as the Deputy Dean of the Faculty of Law for Science. On April 9, 2013, he was transferred to the position of Deputy Dean of the Faculty for Academic Affairs. By order of Minister of Education Nuriddin Saidov on July 11, 2013, he was appointed Deputy Rector of the Tajik Pedagogical Institute for Education. From September 1, 2014, to September 30, 2015, he worked as the Deputy Dean for Educational Affairs of the Faculty of Law of the Tajik National University, and has since October 24, 2015 been working as an associate professor at the Department of International Law of the same faculty. On January 19, 2018, by order of President Emomali Rahmon, he was appointed Director of the National Center for Legislation and worked in this position until July 30 of the same year, when he was appointed rector of the Tajik Pedagogical Institute, working in this position until January 21, 2020.

== In government ==
By order of President Emomali Rahmon on March 6, 2020, he was appointed Head of the Department of Education, Culture and Information of the Executive Office of the President of Tajikistan and worked in this position until May 4, 2021. Since May 6, 2021, he has been working as a deputy of the Assembly of Representatives, and since May 14, 2021, he was working as the Chairman of the Committee on State Structure and Local Self-Government.

On October 22, 2021, Faizali Idizoda was elected deputy chairman of the standing committee of the CIS Interparliamentary Assembly. The day after the 2025 Tajik parliamentary election, he once again became a member of the Assembly of Representatives of Tajikistan as the member for Rasht. On March 19, 2025, at the first session of the newly elected parliament, Idizoda was elected chairman.

== Personal life ==
He is married, and has four children. He holds the rank of Major of Justice.
