= Ministry of Agriculture of Tajikistan =

Ministry of the Government of Tajikistan

Ministry of Agriculture
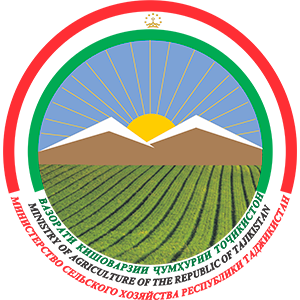
- The ministry's logo

Agency overview
- Formed: 14 December 1924; 101 years ago
- Jurisdiction: Government of Tajikistan
- Headquarters: Dushanbe, Tajikistan
- Minister responsible: Kurban Hakimzoda
- Website: moa.tj

The Ministry of Agriculture of the Republic of Tajikistan (Tajik: Вазорати фарҳанги Ҷумҳурии Тоҷикистон) is a ministry of the Government of Tajikistan responsible for the development of agricultural policy. The head of the ministry is the Minister of Agriculture, appointed by decree of the President of Tajikistan. The current Minister of Agriculture since January 5, 2023 is Kurban Hakimzoda.

== History ==
As early as December 14, 1924, by the decision of the Revolutionary Committee of the Tajik Autonomous Soviet Socialist Republic, the People's Commissariat of Crops was established. The main task of the Commissariat was to organize agricultural affairs and establish collective farms, especially in relation to the mass collectivisation of agriculture and the Five Year Plan. On March 27, 1946, by the Decree of the Presidium of the Supreme Soviet of the Tajik SSR, the People's Commissariat of Crops was divided into two independent ministries - the Ministry of Crops and the Ministry of Livestock. A year later, the two ministries were merged to form the Ministry of Agriculture. In 1953, the Ministry of Agriculture merged with the Ministry of Forestry to form the Ministry of Agriculture and Food Production. Then, in 1957, it merged with the Ministry of State Farms to form the Ministry of Agriculture. In 1962, it was renamed the Ministry of Agricultural Production and Processing, in 1985, the State Committee for Agro-Industry, in 1991, the Ministry of Agriculture, and in 2006, the Ministry of Agriculture and Nature Protection. Since 2008, it has been called the Ministry of Agriculture.

== Ministry structure ==
- Leadership
- Department of Horticulture
- Department of Economic Policy and Foresight
- Finance and Accounting Department
- Department of Livestock, Poultry, Fisheries and Beekeeping
- Department of Science and Application of Scientific Achievements
- Department of Seed Production and Breeding Achievements
- Department of Technical Policy and Agricultural Infrastructure Development
- Department of Works
- Department of International Relations
- Legal Department
- Internal Audit Department
- Personnel and Special Affairs Department

== Subordinate institutions ==
Institutions and organizations subordinate to the Ministry of Agriculture:

- State Veterinary Supervision Service
- State Phytosanitary Supervision and Agricultural Quarantine Service
- State Breeding Supervision Service
- State Seed Supervision Inspectorate
- State Inspection for Agricultural Machinery Control
- State Unitary Enterprise for Import Stock and Sale of Livestock Breeds
- State Unitary Enterprise “Poultry Industry of Tajikistan”
- State Unitary Enterprise “Fruit and Vegetable Industry of Tajikistan”
- State Unitary Enterprise “Seed Varieties of Tajikistan”
- State Unitary Enterprise “Office, Office Building Services”
- State Unitary Enterprise “Asali Tajik”
- State Unitary Enterprise “Tojikniholparvar”
- State Unitary Enterprise “Tojikdehqonshifo”
- State Unitary Enterprise “Madad”
- State Unitary Enterprise “Tojikagroleasing”
- State Unitary Enterprise “Fight against Locusts”
- State Unitary Enterprise “Center for Advanced Training of Personnel in the Agricultural Sector”
- State Unitary Enterprise “Fish of Tajikistan”
- Academy of Agricultural Sciences of Tajikistan
- Agrarian University of Tajikistan
- State Institution “Republican Labor Normative and Research Station”
- Educational Institution of the Specialized College of the Bokhtar District State
- Educational Institution of Mastchoh State Institution "State Commission for Testing Agricultural Crop Varieties and Variety Protection"
- State Institution "State Testing Station of Tajikistan"
- Republican Institution "Animal Breeding and Artificial Insemination"
- State Institution "Breeder" State Institution "Pasture and Reclamation Trust"
- State Institution for Plant Protection and Agricultural Chemization
- State Institution "Republican Laboratory of Immunogenetic Control" Khuroson District
- State Regional Institution for Breeding Tajik Sheep Breed Shahrinav District
- State Regional Institution for Breeding Hissori Sheep Breed
- State Institution "Center for Project Management of Livestock and Pasture Development"
- Departments of Agriculture of the regions and cities and districts.

== Ministers ==
- Qurbi (1924-25)
- A. Azimov (1925-27)
- S. Anvarov (1927-28)
- S. Abdulloev (1931-32)
- M. Urunkhodjaev (1933-34)
- N. Shirinov (1936-37)
- P. Bobokalonov (1937-38)
- J. Iskandarov (1938)
- K. Rakhimov (1939-40)
- R. Rakhimjonov (1940)
- M. Saidov (1940-45)
- J. Rasulov (1945)
- H. Qurbonov (1945-47)
- S. Masaidov (1947-51)
- A. Abdulloev (1951-53)
- D. Kholmatov (1953-61)
- G. Aliev (1953)
- Kh. Mirzoyans (1961-65)
- A. Makhsumov (1965-71)
- Rahmon Nabiyev (1971-73)
- M. Zoirov (1973-82)
- A. Boboev (1982-85)
- A. Turaev (1985)
- V. Vohidov (1988-90)
- A. Boboev (1990-91)
- H. Akbarov (1992)
- Habibullo Tabarov (1992-1994)
- K. Turaev (1994-96)
- M. Barotov (1996-98)
- Sh. Kabirov (1998-2001)
- G. Rakhmatov (2001-2004)
- V. Madaminov (2004-2006)
- A. Qodiri (2006-2008)
- Kosim Rokhbar (2008–March 10, 2015)
- Mahmadtohir Zokirzoda (2015-2016)
- Izzatullo Sattori (2016-October 30, 2020)
- Sulaimon Ziyozoda (October 30, 2020 - January 26, 2022)
- Saadi Karimzoda (January 26, 2022 - January 5, 2023)
- Kurban Hakimzoda (since January 5, 2023)
