= Mahmadtohir Zokirzoda =

Tajik politician (born 1956)

- Маҳмадтоир Зоир Зокирзода
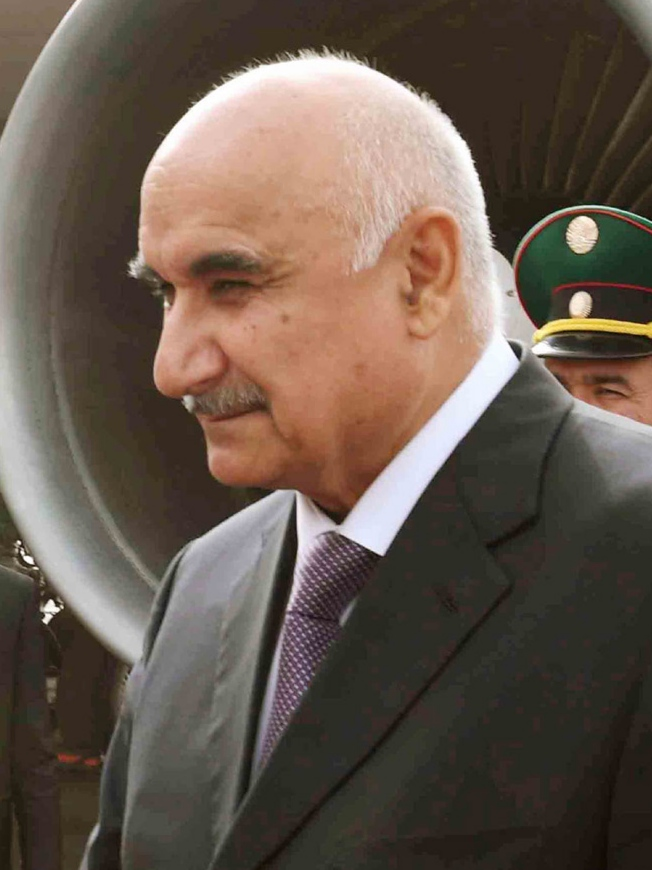
- Zokirzoda in 2018.

Chairman of the Assembly of Representatives of Tajikistan
- In office March 17, 2020 – March 19, 2025
- Preceded by: Shukurjon Zuhurov
- Succeeded by: Fayzali Idizoda

Personal details
- Born: 5 July 1956 (age 70) Rasht District, Tajik SSR, Soviet Union
- Party: People's Democratic Party

Mahmadtohir Zoir Zokirzoda (Tajik: Маҳмадтоир Зоир Зокирзода, born 5 July 1956) is a politician from Tajikistan who served as Chairman of Assembly of Representatives of Tajikistan from 17 March 2020 to 19 March 2025. He previously worked as engineer and CEO.

== Biography ==
He was born on 5 July 1956 in the Rasht district. In 1985 he graduated from the Tselinograd Agricultural Institute (now the Saken Seifullin Kazakh Agrotechnical University in Astana, Kazakhstan). He began his career as a land surveyor at the Tajikgiprozem Design Institute, then worked as a leading engineer, head of the supervisory group of the technological department, chief engineer. He then went into government, serving as chief specialist for the agro-industrial and food complexes of the Cabinet of Ministers, the Council of Ministers, and then Presidential Executive Office.

He then served as Director General of the National Space, Geodesy and Cartographic Agency. From 2006–2008, he was Chairman of the Committee for Emergency Situations and Civil Defense. He then served as Director of the Agency for Land Management, Geodesy and Cartography. From 2010 to 2015 he was the head of state committee of land management and geodesy. From 2015 to 2016 as minister of agriculture. From 2016 to 2020 as deputy prime minister.

== Awards ==
- Medal "Hizmati Shoista".
- Order of Friendship (December 30, 2022, Russia)
- Jubilee medal "20th anniversary of state independence of the Republic of Tajikistan"
