= Nazarbegim Muborakshoeva =

Tajikistani politician

- Born: 1952 (age 73–74)
- Education: Tajik Agricultural Institute

Nazarbegim Muborakshoeva (born 1952) is a Tajikistani politician.

Born in Rushon, Muborakshoeva graduated in 1974 from the Tajik Agricultural Institute; in 1991 she graduated from the Communist Party High School in Tashkent. She began her career as an agronomist at a kolkhoz in Shughnon District, in 1975 becoming a member of the local Komsomol there. Beginning in that year and continuing until 1983, she was an instructor at the organization department of the Komsomol of the Gorno-Badakhshan Autonomous Region, after which she began serving as the first secretary of the Komsomol committees for Rushon and Khorugh. In 1983 she started work as a teacher at the latter city's Committee of the Communist Party of Tajikistan, continuing until 1987, when she became first secretary of the Rushon nohiya committee, a role which she held until 1991. That year she began chairing the executive committee of the nohiya's Council of People's Deputies; in 1997 she became chairwoman of the nohiya as a whole. In 2000 Emomali Rahmon appointed her by decree to the National Assembly; at its first session she was named deputy chair. She took the helm of the Khorugh city council as chair in December 2006. She has also served as mayor of Khorugh.
