= 2013 Tajik presidential election =

- 6 November 2013
- Registered: 4,201,156
- Turnout: 86.64% (▼4.26pp)
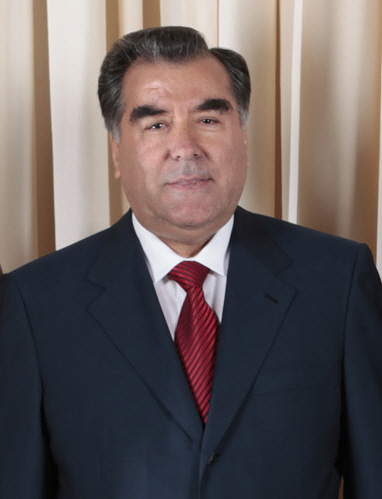

Nominee	Emomali Rahmon	Ismoil Talbakov
Party	PDP	Communist
Popular vote	3,023,754	181,675
Percentage	83.92%	5.04%
- Results by district
President before election
Emomali Rahmon
PDP
Elected President
Emomali Rahmon
PDP

Presidential elections were held in Tajikistan on 6 November 2013. Incumbent President Emomali Rahmon was re-elected with a reported 84% of the vote on a turnout of 86.6%.

In power since 1992, Rahmon was seeking a new term in office, and was widely expected to be re-elected. None of his five opponents, who were "virtual unknowns even inside the country", publicly criticised him, while Oynihol Bobonazarova, a human rights activist generally regarded as the only real opposition candidate was prevented from running, having narrowly failed to obtain sufficient signatures to register as a candidate. Her Islamic Revival Party blamed local authorities for harassing party activists who were seeking to collect signatures.

== Electoral system ==
The President was elected for a seven-year term, with a 50% turnout needed to validate the result. Potential candidates needed to collect 210,000 signatures in order to participate.

Voting centres closed at 22:00 and initial official results were due early the next day.

== Campaign ==
Oynihol Bobonazarova of the Islamic Revival Party withdrew her candidacy on 11 October 2013 after collecting only 202,000 of the 210,000 required. The party claimed this was due to harassment from local authorities during the signature campaign and that it would not take part in the election.

The Social Democratic Party also boycotted the election due to what it said were "violations of the constitution, organised falsifications and a lack of democracy and transparency."

== Conduct ==
The Organization for Security and Co-operation in Europe monitored the elections. It reported "significant shortcomings" in the conduct of the poll, and criticised "restrictive candidate-registration requirements" including an "unreasonably large number of signatures potential candidates must gather to qualify", which it considered "resulted in a lack of pluralism and genuine choice."

== Results ==
Candidate	Party	Votes	%
Emomali Rahmon	People's Democratic Party	3,023,754	83.92
Ismoil Talbakov	Communist Party	181,675	5.04
Talibek Buhariyev	Agrarian Party	166,224	4.61
Olimzhon Boboyev	Party of Economic Reforms	140,733	3.91
Abduhalim Ghafforov	Socialist Party	54,148	1.50
Saidjafar Ismanov	Democratic Party	36,573	1.02
Total		3,603,107	100.00
Valid votes		3,603,107	98.98
Invalid/blank votes		36,949	1.02
Total votes		3,640,056	100.00
Registered voters/turnout		4,201,156	86.64
Source: IFES
