= Hamra Tairova =

Soviet-Tajikistani politician

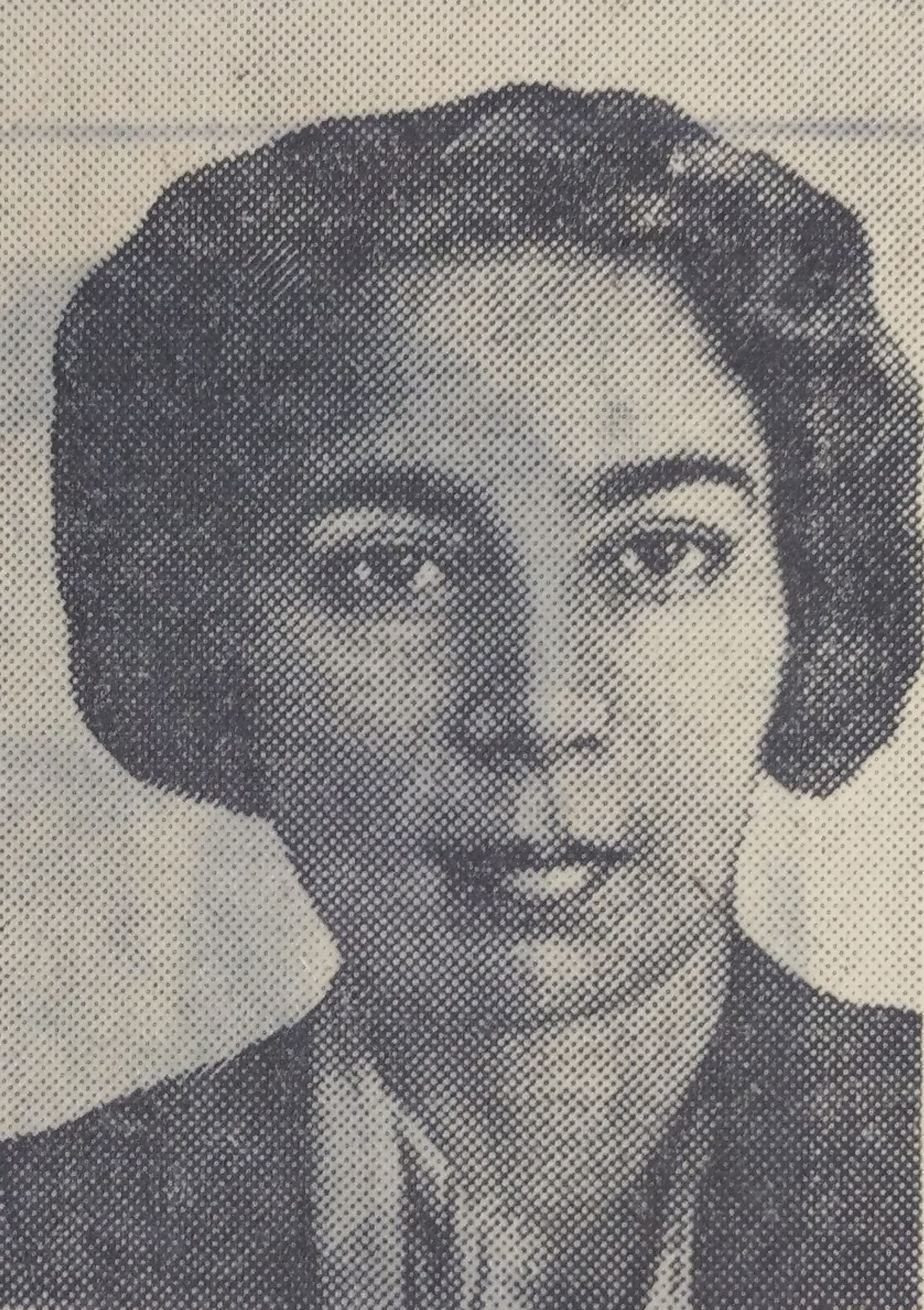
Hamra Zairovna Tairova

Hamra Zairovna Tairova (1912-1990) was a Soviet-Tajikistani communist politician .

From 1935 she was engaged in economic, social and political work. In 1935-1971. - Engineer, foreman, head of the construction site, deputy head of the main industrial department of the Tajik SSR, deputy head and head of department of the Central Committee of the Communist Party of Tajikistan, Minister of Urban and Rural Construction, Minister of Construction of the Tajik SSR, Chairman of the State Planning Commission of the Tajik SSR, Chairman of the Tajik Society of Friendship with Foreign Countries. She served as Minister of Building, Country- and City Development. She died on 14 February 1990.
