= Abdulmajid Dostiev =

Tajikistan politician and diplomat

- Абдулмаҷид Достиев
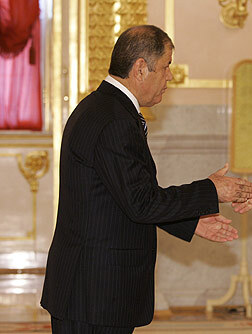
- Dostiev in 2007

Leader of the People's Democratic Party
- In office 10 December 1994 – 18 March 1998
- Preceded by: Position established
- Succeeded by: Emomali Rahmon

Ambassador of Tajikistan to Russia
- In office March 2, 2007 – 2014
- President: Emomali Rahmon
- Preceded by: Safar Safarov
- Succeeded by: Imudin Sattorov

Personal details
- Born: 10 May 1946 (age 80) Bokhtar District, Kurgan-Tyube, Tajik SSR, USSR
- Party: People's Democratic Party of Tajikistan

Abdulmajid Salimovich Dostiev (Tajik: Абдулмаҷид Достиев; born 10 May 1946) is a Tajikistani politician and diplomat.

== Early life ==
Born in Bokhtar District in 1946, Dostiev served in the Soviet Army from 1966 until 1968 before pursuing a career in agriculture. Dostiev worked on a kolkhoz (communal farm) and went on to study entomology at the Agricultural University of Tajikistan, graduating in 1974. In 1977 he became the chief agronomist at the Qurghonteppa Department of Agriculture, and in 1980 he became head of that department.

== Political career ==
In 1992, as the Soviet Union collapsed, Dostiev joined the Sitodi Melli armed militia of the Popular Front, becoming secretary of the regional executive committee, and in November of that year was appointed to the Tajik Supreme Soviet as first deputy. The next year he founded the People's Party of Tajikistan (now the People's Democratic Party of Tajikistan), serving as chair until 1998.

In 1995 he was elected to the Supreme Assembly (Majlisi Oli), and in 1996 he was appointed deputy chair of the assembly, a position he held for four years. He also served as deputy of the Commission for National Reconciliation in 1997. In 2000, he was elected to the assembly's lower chamber, where he served as deputy parliamentary chair.

== Diplomatic career ==
In December 2006, he was appointed as the Ambassador Extraordinary and Plenipotentiary of the Republic of Tajikistan to the Russian Federation and concurrently to Ukraine.

== Post-diplomatic career ==
In 2021, he proposed to rename Iskanderkul to Kuli Rahmon or Rakhmonkul, after President Emomali Rahmon, in order for "the name of the aggressor and villain, Alexander the Great, will disappear from the map of our beloved homeland".

== Personal life ==
He speaks Tajik, Russian, and Uzbek. He is married with five children and grandchildren.

== Awards and titles ==
- Medal "For Distinguished Labour" (1981)
- Honored Worker of Science and Technology of Tajikistan
- Order of Ismoili Somoni
- Order of Dousti
- Order of the Commonwealth
