= Vakhdat prison riot =

2019 prison riot in Tajikistan

Date	May 19, 2019
Location	Kirepichniy prison, Vahdat, Tajikistan
Result	Tajik victory: Riot suppressed

Belligerents
Tajikistan	Islamic State prisoners

Casualties and losses
3 prison guards killed	17 killed (per Tajik government)
- 12 other prisoners killed (per Tajikistan) (Note: 5 IRPT officials killed by ISIS, 7 others killed by Tajik guards. The IRPT suggests the death toll is much higher, but did not provide numbers.)

On May 19, 2019, Islamic State members imprisoned in Vakhdat, Tajikistan revolted and killed several prisoners before prison guards fired on the rioters. At least 29 inmates and 3 guards were killed in the riot.

== Background ==
Tajikistan has been ruled by the brutally oppressive Emomali Rahmon regime since independence in 1991. In the late 1990s, Tajikistan underwent a civil war between the secular, Communist-era government led by Rahmon and the Islamic Renaissance Party of Tajikistan (IRPT), an Islamist political party turned militia. The government won the war, and much of the IPRT's leadership was forced into exile or imprisoned. The rise of the Islamic State during the Syrian civil war led many devout Tajiks to join the ranks of ISIS, and those who were caught were repatriated into Tajikistan and imprisoned. The Islamic State then found a host in the Tajik prison system, forming an extensive network.

In November 2018, the Islamic State claimed responsibility for a riot at Khujand prison that killed 27 people. The Vakhdat prison contains 1,500 inmates.

== Riot ==
On May 19, around 30 Islamic State-aligned prisoners armed with knives killed three security guards and then took several prisoners hostage, killing five of them. One of the prisoners killed by IS was a senior member of the IRPT, Sattor Kharimov. Two other people killed, Saeed Qiyomiddin Ghozi and Jomahmad Boev, were both IRPT political prisoners; Ghozi was a founding member of the IRPT and Boev was a cleric that called to overthrow the government. The other two people killed by the Islamic State were Allamurod Makhanov and Akmal Hoshimov. Another ten people were "savagely beaten" by the Islamic State members. The leaders of the revolt were Bekhruz Gulmorod, the son of Tajik special forces member Gulmorod Khalimov, who defected in 2015 to join ISIS and was killed in Syria. Jamoliddin Khanasov was another leader of the Islamic State rebels.

The Tajik government said in a statement that the militants took over the hospital and set it on fire, along with freeing other Islamic State prisoners. The government then said that security guards fired on the rioters, killing 24 of them and ending the riot. The Interior Ministry said that of the 24 killed, 17 were Islamic State members. The wives of the prisoners, who were in a separate facility nearby, said that they first heard clashes around 9pm and gunshots lasting for 30 minutes. Residents of Vakhdat said that they heard ambulances and fire trucks headed towards the prison. Bekhruz Gulmorod was among those killed, and he was buried without family in attendance and without Islamic prayers. Sattor Kharimov's family was in attendance, and he was given Islamic prayers.

The IRPT, from abroad, accused the Tajik government of withholding information about the riot and said that the death toll was much higher than reported, citing rushed burials and injury claims that did not add up. Edward Lemon, a fellow at the Kennan Institute, said that lots of things about the riot did not add up, and suggested that Tajik authorities let the riot happen to eliminate political opponents like Kharimov. He questioned the disproportionate use of force on the unarmed prisoners by the Tajik guards.
