= 1990 Dushanbe riots =

Violent unrest in the Tajik SSR of the Soviet Union

- Part of the dissolution of the Soviet Union and spillover of the First Nagorno-Karabakh War
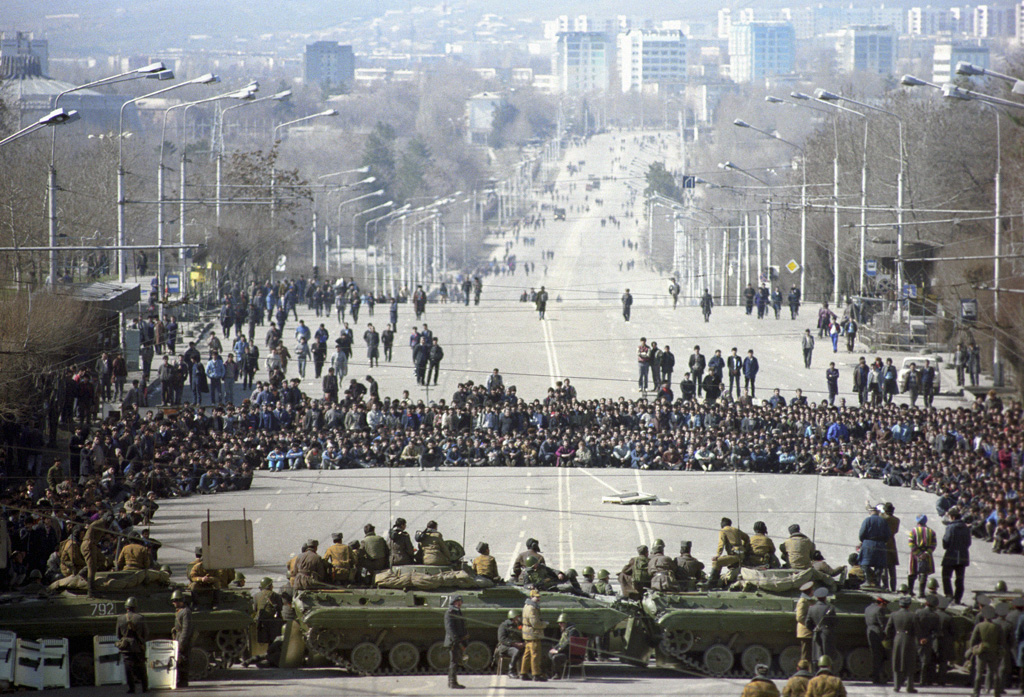
- BMPs blocking off protesters in the city's main thoroughfare following the imposition of martial law, 14 February 1990
- Date: 12–14 February 1990 (2 days)
- Location: Dushanbe, Tajik SSR, Soviet Union; 38°32′12″N 68°46′48″E
- Caused by: Local anti-Armenian sentiment and Tajik anti-communist nationalism
- Result: Outbreak of the Tajikistani Civil War in 1992

Parties
Tajik nationalists: Rastokhez; Tajik Islamists	Soviet Union: Communist Party of the Soviet Union; KGB; MVD; Internal Troops; OMON; Communist Party of Tajikistan; Tajik KGB

Lead figures
Tohir Abdujabbor	Izatullo Khayoyev; Qahhor Mahkamov; Yaqub Salimov

Casualties
- Deaths: 26
- Injuries: 565
- Location within Tajikistan Location within the Soviet Union

The 1990 Dushanbe riots marked a period of heightened civil disobedience and inter-ethnic violence in Dushanbe, the capital city of the Tajik SSR of the Soviet Union. Existing tensions over lacking economic and political reforms were exacerbated by the arrival of Armenian refugees from the Azerbaijan SSR due to the First Nagorno-Karabakh War. The mass movement of Tajik nationalists (e.g., the Rastokhez), anti-communists, and Islamists targeted ethnic minorities, such as Armenians, Russians, Jews, as well as unaffiliated Tajiks—namely women who did not conform to Islamic clothing standards. By late 1991, the dissolution of the Soviet Union gave way to the Republic of Tajikistan declaring independence, though this was followed by the Tajikistani Civil War less than a year later.

== Causes ==
=== Armenian refugees ===
In 1988, in the aftermath of the Sumgait pogrom and anti-Armenian riots in Azerbaijan, 39 Armenian refugees from Azerbaijan were temporarily resettled in Dushanbe. In 1990, the Armenian influx became a subject of the rumour that triggered riots in Dushanbe. The rumour inflated the number of refugees to 2,500–5,000. According to rumour Armenians allegedly were being resettled in new housing in Dushanbe, which was experiencing an acute housing shortage at that time. Despite the fact that Armenian refugees resettled not in public housing but with their relatives, and by 1990 had already left Tajikistan for Armenia, official denouncement of the rumours was not able to stop the protests. Assurances by First Secretary of the Communist Party of Tajikistan Qahhor Mahkamov that no resettlement of Armenians were taking place were rejected by the demonstrators.

=== Economy, politics, and Islam ===
Soon, demonstrations sponsored by the nationalist Rastokhez movement turned violent. Radical economical and political reforms were demanded by the protesters. Government buildings, shops and other businesses were attacked and looted. Armenians, Russians, and other ethnic minorities were targeted. Abuse of Tajik women wearing European clothes in public also took place. The riots were put down by Soviet troops called into Dushanbe by Mahkamov. However Mahkamov's over-reliance on military force was criticized by Buri Karimov, a deputy chair of Council of Ministers, who called for the resignation of the leadership of the Tajik Communist Party. On February 14, 1990, Mahkamov and Prime Minister of Tajikistan Izatullo Khayoyev submitted their resignations, but they were not accepted by the Central Committee of the Tajik Communist Party.

=== Riots and other Central Asian SSRs ===
During the Dushanbe riots, a period lasting a couple of days, 26 people were killed and 565 were injured. Among the Tajik youth activists convicted for participation in the riots was a future minister of the interior of Tajikistan Yaqub Salimov. Smaller scale anti-Armenian incidents were also recorded in neighboring Turkmenistan.

== Aftermath ==
Tajikistan would declare independence on 9 December 1991, from the collapsing Soviet Union. In 1992, a civil war would begin in the newly independent nation.
