= Supreme Soviet of the Tajik Soviet Socialist Republic =

1937–1994 legislature of the Tajik SSR and Tajikistan

Supreme Soviet of the Tajik SSR Верховный Совет Таджикской ССР Совети Олии РСС Тоҷикистон
- Tajik SSR (1937–1991); Tajikistan (1991–1994)
- Coat of arms of the Tajik Soviet Socialist Republic

Type
- Type: Supreme Soviet

History
- Established: 1937
- Disbanded: 1994
- Succeeded by: Supreme Assembly

Elections
- Voting system: Direct show elections
- Last election: 1990

Meeting place
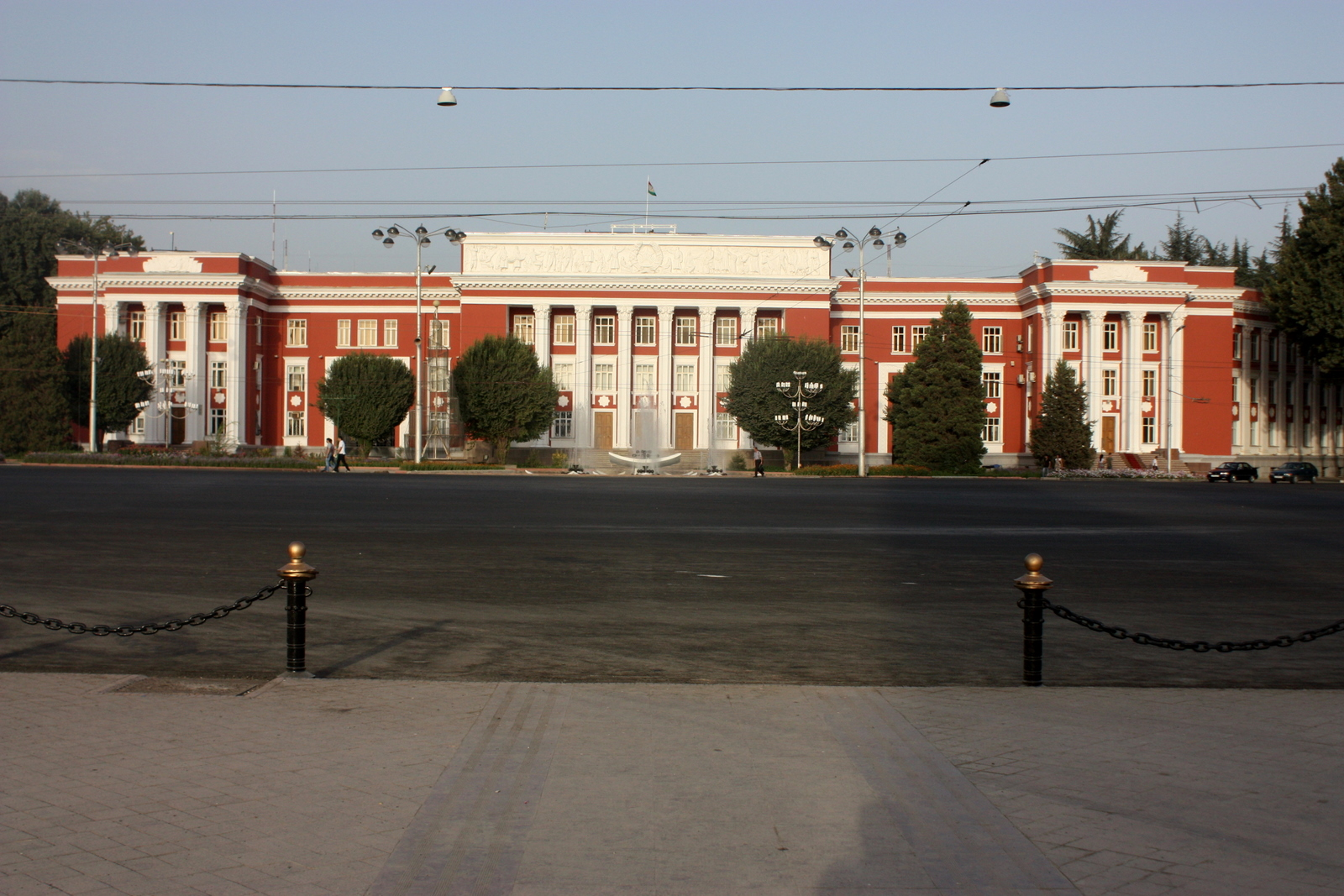
- Parliament House, Dushanbe

The Supreme Soviet of the Tajik SSR (Tajik: Совети Олии РСС Тоҷикистон, romanized: Soveti Olii RSS Tojikiston; Russian: Верховный Совет Таджикской ССР) was the highest organ of state authority of the Tajik SSR, one of the republics comprising the Soviet Union. The Supreme Soviet had very little power and carried out orders given by the Communist Party of Tajikistan (CPT), until democratic elections held during glasnost and perestroika.

== Chairman ==
- Nigmat Ashurov (July 13, 1938 -?)
- Tahir Pulatov (1945-1952)
- Abduvahid Khasanov (? - August 17, 1961)
- Mirsaid Mirshakar (August 17, 1961 - July 3, 1975)
- Juraev Kandil (July 3, 1975 - March 25, 1980)
- Usman Hasanov (March 25, 1980 - March 29, 1985)
- Talbak Nazarov (March 29, 1985 - November 18, 1988)
- Muratali Tabarov (November 18, 1988 - April 12, 1990)

== See also ==
- List of Chairmen of the Supreme Soviet of the Tajik Soviet Socialist Republic
