= Mahmadruzi Iskandarov =

Tajikistani politician

Mahmadruzi Iskandarov (Tajik: Маҳмадрузи Искандаров, Russian: Махмадрузи Искандаров; born 3 May 1954) is a Tajik opposition politician and the chairman of the Democratic Party of Tajikistan. Arrested in 2005, he is currently serving a 23-year prison term. As Iskandarov is serving his jail sentence, Masud Sobirov has taken leadership of the Democratic Party.
