= Rahmatullo Zoirov =

Tajik politician (1957–2024)

- Раҳматилло Зойиров
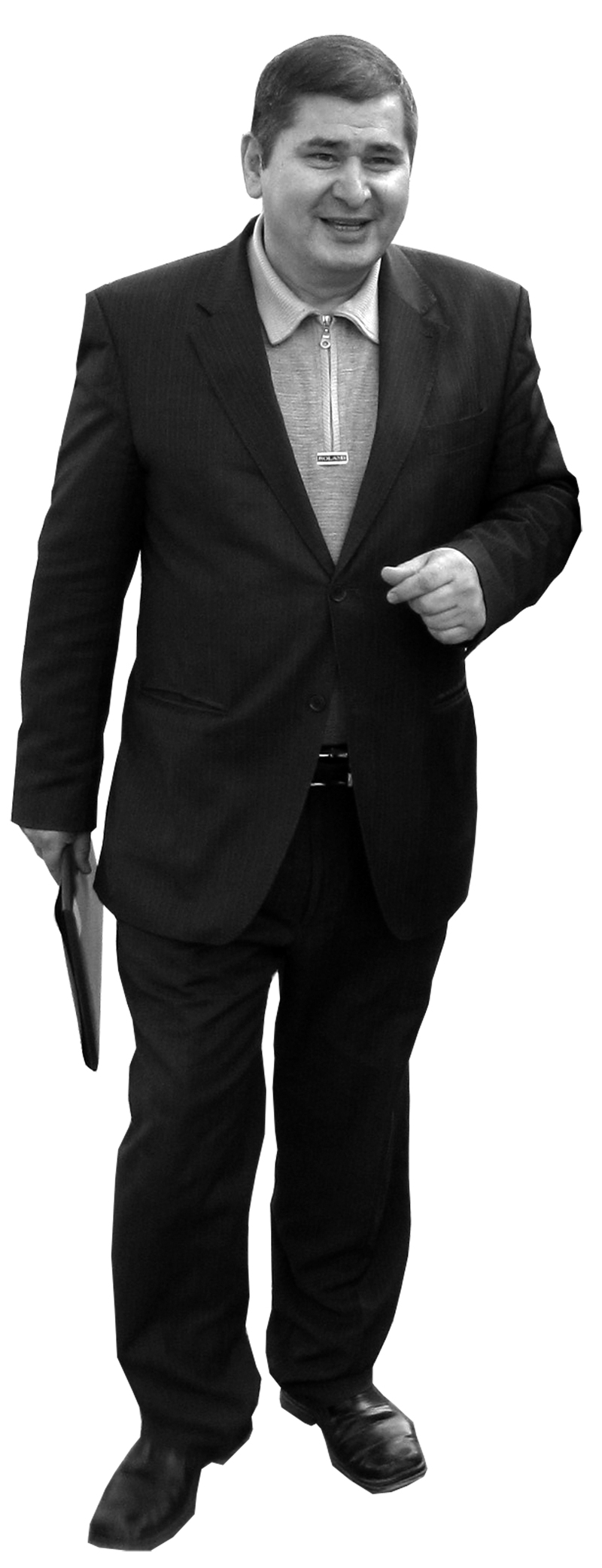
- Born: 16 March 1957; Bogʻiston, Boʻstonliq District, Tashkent Region, Uzbek SSR, USSR (now Uzbekistan)
- Died: 18 May 2024 (aged 67)
- Occupation: Politician

Rahmatullo Zoirov (Tajik: Раҳматилло Зойиров; 16 March 1957 – 18 May 2024) was a Tajik politician who was chairman of the Social Democratic Party of Tajikistan. He graduated from the Ukrainian Law Academy in 1983. He was a Candidate of Sciences and spoke more than 10 languages. Zoirov died on 18 May 2024, at the age of 67.
