= Ismoil Talbakov =

Tajikistani communist politician (1955–2016)

Ismoil Talbakov Исмоил Талбаков

Leader of the Communist Party of Tajikistan
- In office 2 July 2016 – 17 December 2016
- Preceded by: Shodi Shabdolov
- Succeeded by: Mirzoazim Nasimov (Acting)

Personal details
- Born: Ismoil Ibrohimovich Talbakov; 24 March 1955 Khatlon Region, Tajik SSR, Soviet Union
- Died: 17 December 2016 (aged 61) Dushanbe, Tajikistan
- Party: CPSU (until 1991), Communist Party of Tajikistan (1992-2016)
- Children: Sorbon Talbakov
- Education: Tajik National University

Ismoil Talbakov (24 March 1955 – 17 December 2016) was a Tajik politician, presidential candidate in Tajikistan's 2006 and 2013 presidential elections, representing the Communist Party.
