= Palace of Unity =

Headquarters of Tajikistan's ruling People's Democratic Party

Coordinates: 38°35′24″N 68°47′8.8″E

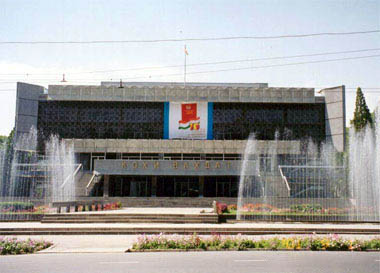
The Palace of Unity

The Palace of Unity (Russian: Дворец Единства, romanized: Dvorets Edinstva; Tajik: Кохи Ваҳдат/Kokhi Vahdat/کاخ وحدت), also referred to as Vahdat Palace (Russian: Кохи Вахдат, romanized: Kokhi Vakhdat), is a building in Dushanbe, Tajikistan. Located in the northern part of Dushanbe's main thoroughfare, Rudaki Avenue, near Hotel Avesto and the embassy of Uzbekistan, it is the headquarters of the ruling People's Democratic Party and is also used to host international conferences.

== November 2007 bombing ==
In November 2007, a bomb was left in a plastic bag near a wall outside of the Palace. A 77-year-old man, variously reported to be a janitor, a street sweeper, or a security guard, was the only victim; he was killed at 08:10 on 14 November 2007 when he picked up the plastic bag containing the bomb, causing it to explode. The explosion also blew out many windows at the palace.
