= 2000 Tajik parliamentary election =

Parliamentary elections were held in Tajikistan on 27 February 2000, with a second round in 11 of the 41 constituencies on 12 March. The result was a victory for the People's Democratic Party of Tajikistan, which won 36 of the 63 seats. Voter turnout was 93%.

== Results ==
Party	National			Constituency			Total seats	+/–
Party	Votes	%	Seats	Votes	%	Seats	Total seats	+/–
People's Democratic Party of Tajikistan	1,741,540	65.10	15			21	36	+31
Communist Party of Tajikistan	547,076	20.45	5			8	13	–47
Islamic Renaissance Party of Tajikistan	196,105	7.33	2			0	2	New
Democratic Party of Tajikistan	94,963	3.55	0			0	0	New
Socialist Party of Tajikistan	37,728	1.41	0			0	0	New
Justice Party of Tajikistan	35,414	1.32	0			0	0	New
Independents						10	10	–103
Against all	22,322	0.83	–				–	–
Vacant							2	–
Total	2,675,148	100.00	22			39	63	–118
Valid votes	2,675,148	99.71						
Invalid/blank votes	7,862	0.29						
Total votes	2,683,010	100.00						
Registered voters/turnout	2,873,832	93.36						
Source: Nohlen et al.
