= Yaqub Salimov =

Yaqub Salimov (Tajik: Яъқуб Салимов, Persian: یعقوب سلیموف, Russian: Якуб Салимов; born 20 May 1956) served as Minister of the Interior of Tajikistan from December 1993 to 1995.

== Career ==
Salimov, described as a 'mafia' figure by Olivier Roy, was allegedly involved in smuggling and racketeering during the Soviet era. In 1990, Yaqub Salimov was convicted for taking part in the Dushanbe riots. When the Tajikistani Civil War broke out, Salimov was released from prison, and became a leader of Popular Front of Tajikistan, a paramilitary group fighting on the government side. Salimov became a leader of the Kulabi faction, because his mafia was simply the expression of Kulabi solidarity networks, with access to arms and money, according to Olivier Roy.

He was appointed Minister of Internal Affairs of Tajikistan in December 1993. In 1995 he was relieved of this post and was made Ambassador to Turkey. In 1997, he was charged with attempting a coup d'état. He subsequently fled Tajikistan but was arrested in Moscow in 2003 and extradited to Tajikistan. On 25 April 2005, he was sentenced to 15 years in prison. Salimov was released on 21 June 2016.
