= Mirhusein Narziyev =

Tajikistani politician

Mirhusein Narziyev is the chairman of the Socialist Party of Tajikistan.

== See also ==
- Politics of Tajikistan
