= 2006 Tajik presidential election =

- 6 November 2006
- Registered: 3,356,221
- Turnout: 90.90% (▼8.02pp)
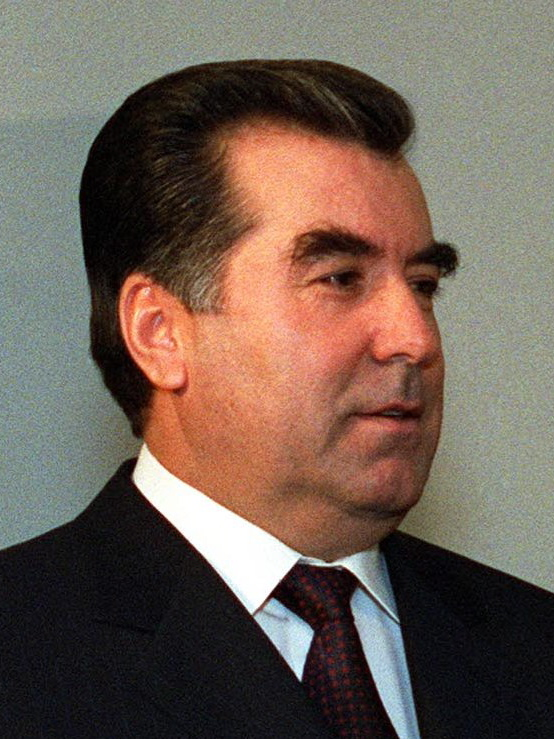

Nominee	Emomali Rahmonov	Olimzhon Boboyev
Party	PDP	PERT
Popular vote	2,419,192	190,138
Percentage	80.34%	6.31%
- Results by district
President before election
Emomali Rahmonov
PDP
Elected President
Emomali Rahmonov
PDP

Presidential elections were held in Tajikistan on 6 November 2006. The result was a victory for incumbent President Emomali Rahmonov, who won a third term in office after receiving 80% of the vote.

== Candidates ==
Five candidates contested the elections:

- Emomali Rahmonov — incumbent president and a member of the dominant People's Democratic Party of Tajikistan. Constitutional provisions that had barred Rahmonov from seeking further terms had been controversially removed.
- Abduhalim Ghafforov — registered as representing the Socialist Party, although this is not the original Socialist Party, which was denied registration.
- Amir Qaroqulov — Agrarian Party
- Olimzhon Boboyev — Party of Economic Reforms
- Ismoil Talbakov — Communist Party of Tajikistan

The Islamic Renaissance Party of Tajikistan, the Democratic Party, and the Social Democratic Party all boycotted the elections, criticising the country's electoral apparatus as unreliable and refusing to accept the constitutional changes that allowed Rakhmanov to seek a third term.

== Campaign ==
A rally by opposition parties was broken up. According to the BBC, none of the four candidates opposing Rahmonov have publicly criticised him, and the Organization for Security and Co-operation in Europe has said that "[n]o signs of a competitive campaign have been observed thus far".

== Conduct ==
CIS election monitors declared the elections "legal, free and transparent", while the OSCE condemned them, and the election has been called "flawed and unfair but peaceful."

== Results ==
Candidate	Party	Votes	%
Emomali Rahmonov	People's Democratic Party	2,419,192	80.34
Olimzhon Boboyev	Party of Economic Reforms	190,138	6.31
Ismoil Talbakov	Communist Party	159,493	5.30
Amir Qaroqulov	Agrarian Party	156,991	5.21
Abduhalim Ghafforov	Socialist Party	85,295	2.83
Total		3,011,109	100.00
Valid votes		3,011,109	98.70
Invalid/blank votes		39,529	1.30
Total votes		3,050,638	100.00
Registered voters/turnout		3,356,221	90.90
Source: OCSE
