= 2020 Tajik presidential election =

- 11 October 2020
- Registered: 4,943,289
- Turnout: 85.44% (▼1.20pp)
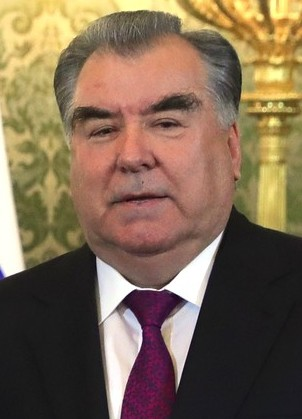

Nominee	Emomali Rahmon	Rustam Latifzoda
Party	PDP	APT
Popular vote	3,853,987	128,182
Percentage	92.08%	3.06%
- Results by district
President before election
Emomali Rahmon
PDP
Elected President
Emomali Rahmon
PDP

Presidential elections were held in Tajikistan on 11 October 2020. The result was a fifth straight victory for authoritarian long-term incumbent Emomali Rahmon of the People's Democratic Party, who was re-elected with over 90% of the vote. Rahmon was inaugurated for his fifth term on 30 October. He was sworn in at a ceremony at the Kokhi Somon Palace in Dushanbe.

== Electoral system ==
The President of Tajikistan is elected for a seven-year term using the two-round system; if no candidate receives over 50% of all votes cast, a second round is held between 15 and 31 days later between the two candidates who received the most votes. For the result to be validated, voter turnout must exceed 50%; if it falls below the threshold, fresh elections will be held.

Candidates are required to gather and submit signatures from 5% of registered voters in order to run in the elections.

== Candidates ==
In power as President since 1994, incumbent president Emomali Rahmon could seek a new term in office. It was speculated that his son Rustam Emomali or a close ally could run if he did not. No election in Tajikistan has been judged as free and fair since its independence from the Soviet Union, and Tajikistan is described by international media as an authoritarian state.

In 2019, a retired doctor named Quvvatali Murodov sought to challenge Rahmon and suggested that "the authorities drop restrictions that make it difficult to run for the presidency".

In 2019, Sharofiddin Gadoev, a leader of the banned opposition movement Group 24, said that he had been abducted in Russia and brought to Tajikistan. He reported that his captors told him Rustam Emomali would take part in the 2020 election.

On 3 September 2020, Faromuz Irgashev, a 30-year-old lawyer from Tajikistan’s eastern Gorno-Badakhshan Autonomous Region (GBAO), announced his intent to run for the presidency via a YouTube video. He linked his decision to run to witnessing police abuse in Khorog and GBAO more widely.

After speculations about whether Rahmon's son Rustam would stand as presidential candidate, finally Rahmon was nominated by his party in a party congress on 3 September 2020. Previously, he was also nominated by the Federation of Independent Trade Unions congress in 26 August and by the Union of Tajikistan's Youth.

In 14 September, the Central Election Commission (CEC) announced that five men have been registered as candidates in this election: Rustam Latifzoda (Agrarian Party), Abduhalim Ghafforov (Socialist Party), Miroj Abdulloyev (Communist Party), Rustam Rahmatzoda (Party of Economic Reform), and Rahmon himself (People's Democratic Party). Irgashev's candidacy was rejected by the CEC because he didn't submit his registration by the deadline. All of the approved candidates generally espouse pro-government positions.

== Conduct ==
Prior to elections, on 6 October there were reports of protests in the capital Dushanbe. One protester said "Protest actions and rallies of those dissatisfied with the results of the presidential elections in Tajikistan are impossible," referring to ongoing protests in Belarus and Kyrgyzstan that may spill over into Tajikistan.

== Results ==
A foregone conclusion, incumbent president Rahmon won re-election, allegedly with over 90% of the vote. Just as with prior elections, the election was not deemed to be free or fair.

Candidate	Party	Votes	%
Emomali Rahmon	People's Democratic Party	3,853,987	92.08
Rustam Latifzoda	Agrarian Party	128,182	3.06
Rustam Rahmatzoda	Party of Economic Reforms	90,918	2.17
Abduhalim Ghafforov	Socialist Party	63,082	1.51
Miroj Abdulloyev	Communist Party	49,535	1.18
Total		4,185,704	100.00
Valid votes		4,185,704	98.75
Invalid/blank votes		53,135	1.25
Total votes		4,238,839	100.00
Registered voters/turnout		4,943,289	85.75
Source: CEC, Khovar
