= Muhiddin Kabiri =

Tajikistani politician (born 1965)

- Муҳиддин Кабирӣ
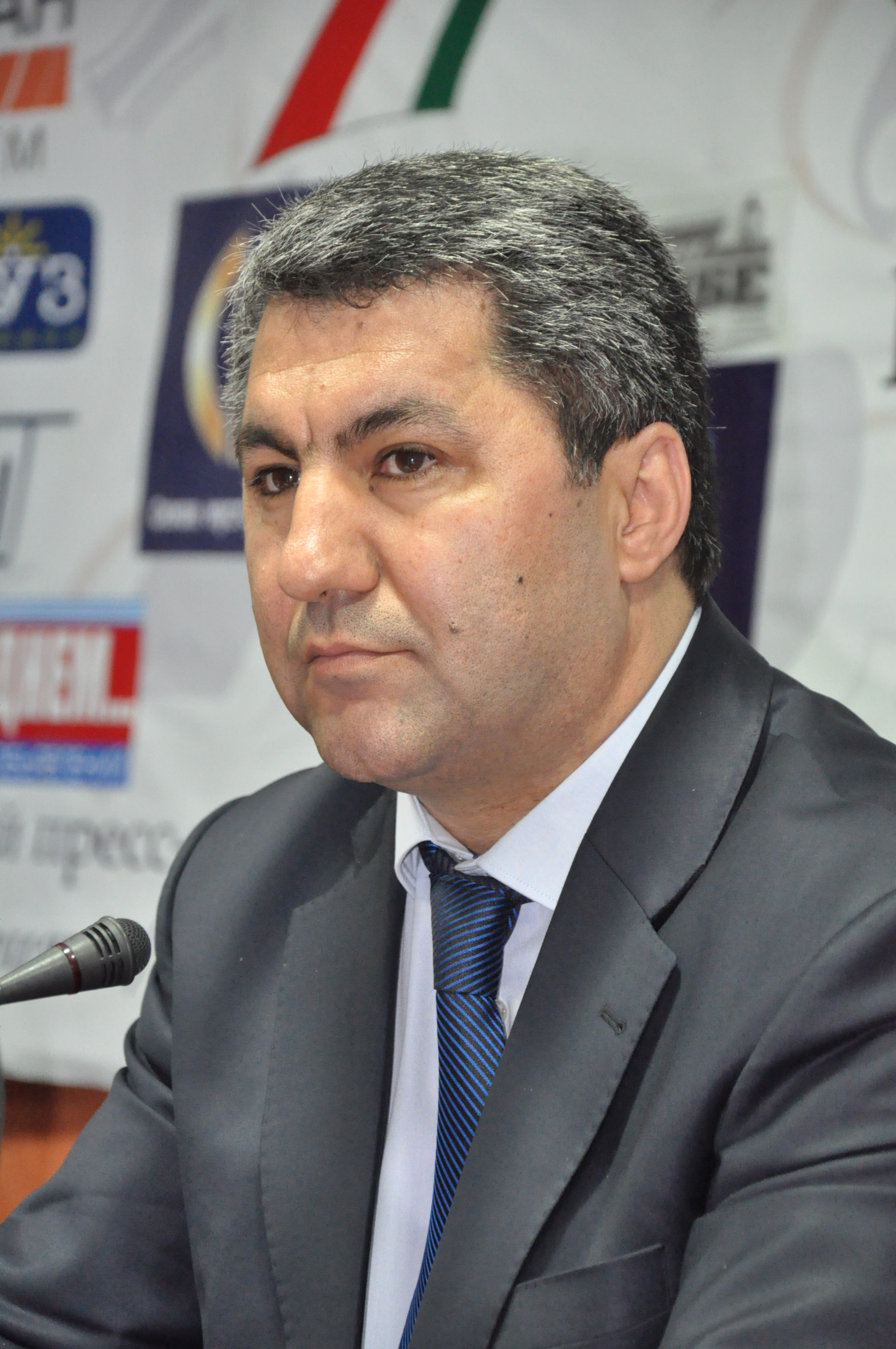
- Kabiri in 2012.

Chairman of the Islamic Renaissance Party of Tajikistan
- Incumbent
- Assumed office August 9, 2006
- Preceded by: Sayid Abdulloh Nuri

Personal details
- Born: Muhiddin Tilloevich Kabirov; Муҳиддин Тиллоевич Кабиров; 20 July 1965 (age 61) Faizobod District, Tajik SSR, Soviet Union
- Party: Islamic Renaissance Party of Tajikistan
- Relations: Ibrahim Hamza Tillozoda; Ruhullo Tillozoda
- Education: Vakhdat Statistical College; Tajik National University; Diplomatic Academy of the Ministry of Foreign Affairs of the Russian Federation

Muhiddin Kabiri (Note: Tajik: Муҳиддин Кабирӣ) (born Muhiddin Tilloevich Kabirov; (Note: Tajik: Муҳиддин Тиллоевич Кабиров) 20 July 1965), is a Tajikistani politician who is serving as the chairman of the opposition Islamic Renaissance Party (IRPT) which was banned in Tajikistan in August 2015. Kabiri was a former member of the parliament of Tajikistan. He is fluent in Tajik, Persian, Arabic, Russian, and English.

== Early life and career ==
Kabiri was born in the Faizobod District of Tajikistan into a devout Sunni Muslim family. During the country's civil war in 1992–1997, Kabiri lived in Russia and had a business there. Upon returning to Dushanbe in 1997, he became a close ally of Said Abdullo Nuri, the leader of the IRPT, becoming deputy chairman of the party in 2000. In 2005, he was elected to the parliament of Tajikistan through an IRPT party list.

Kabiri effectively led the IRPT from 2004, when Said Abdullo Nuri was diagnosed with cancer. Despite the resistance of many conservative members of the party, Nuri recommended Kabiri as his replacement, and Kabiri was elected the chairman of IRPT following Nuri's death in August 2006. Kabiri is credited with repairing ideological divisions within the party, strengthening it, and sidelining the more conservative and radical members of the party. In October 2011, he was reelected as chairman of the party.

== 2015 election loss, exile and terrorism accusations ==
At the parliamentary elections on 1 March 2015, IRPT received only 1.5% of the votes and therefore lost all its seats. The day after the elections, the exile founder of banned opposition party Group 24, Umarali Kuvvatov, was assassinated in Istanbul. After having publicly accused the Tajik leader for the murder of Kuvvatov, Kabiri left the country, amid rumours that he would be arrested and that his party would be banned.

On 26 September 2015, the Supreme Court of Tajikistan banned the Islamic Renaissance Party of Tajikistan, declaring it an extremist and terrorist party. The court stated that the party had been found to be linked to ISIS and had participated in an armed attack on a police station during the night of 3–4 September 2015, led by the Deputy Minister of Defense, Abduhalim Nazarzoda. The authorities claimed that during a search of the IRPT headquarters, after 14 senior party members had been arrested, documentation had been found which showed that the attack had just been the precursor to a much larger attack, planned by Kabiri and the others, which would have involved several hundred terrorists who would simultaneously attack numerous official buildings and the Dushanbe Airport.

== Interpol arrest warrant issued and removed ==
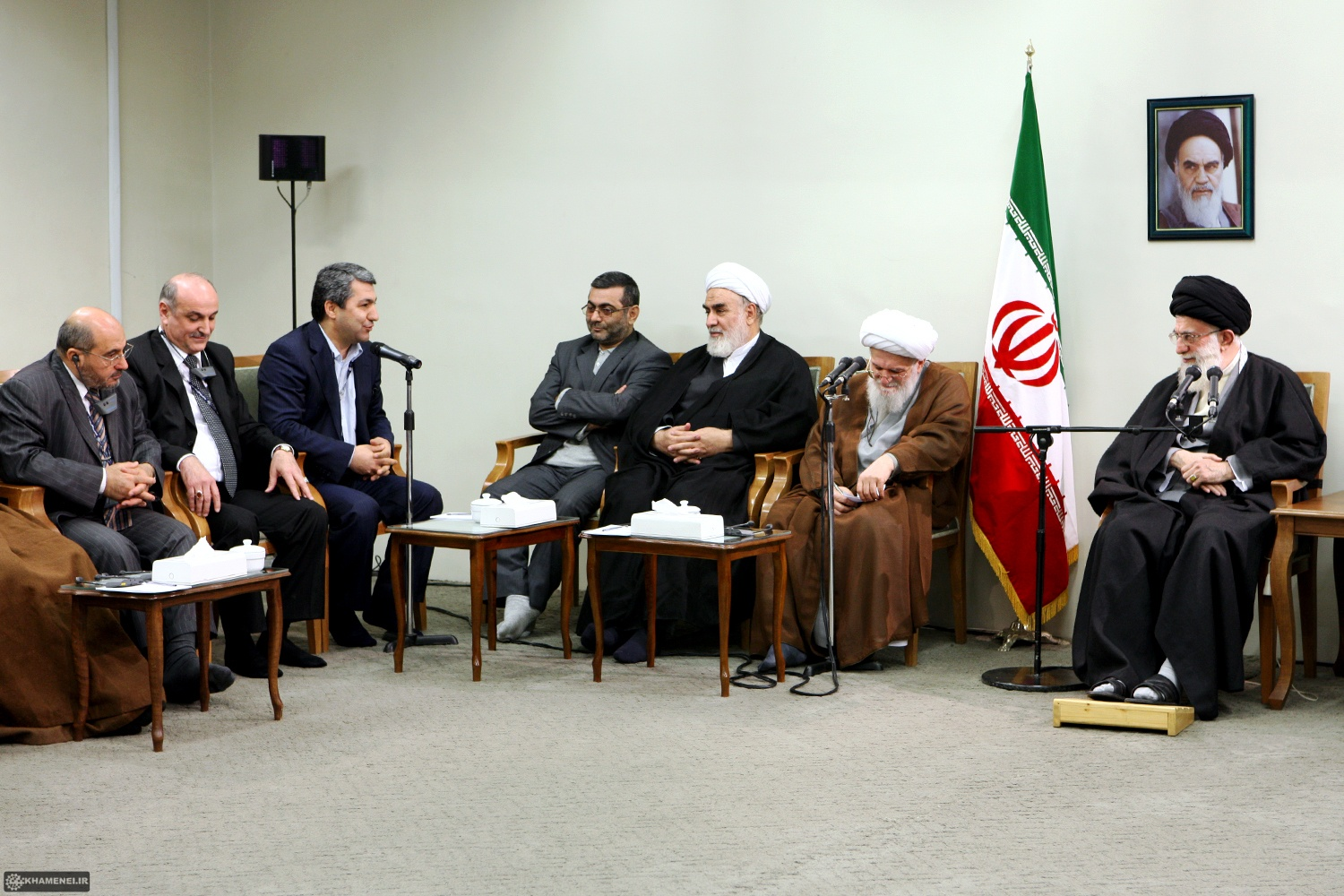
Muhiddin Kabiri speaking at the 2011 International Islamic Unity Conference with Ayatollah Ali Khamenei

In July 2016, the Minister of Internal Affairs of Tajikistan, Ramazon Rahimzoda, announced that Interpol had agreed to issue a Red Notice arrest warrant for Muhiddin Kabiri, as he was wanted for "terrorism, organization of a criminal society and fraud". At the time, he was thought to be somewhere in the European Union. A total of 1,661 people from Tajikistan were at the time on the Interpol wanted list, whereof 1,400 for crimes related to terrorism and extremism.

On 2 March 2018, Interpol announced that Kabiri had been removed from its wanted list.

On 27 January 2019, Radio Free Europe/Radio Liberty published an interview with Muhiddin Kabiri, in which he answered in writing from his hideaway to written questions sent to him. In this interview, he strongly denied that IRPT had any connections to ISIS or Abduhalim Nazarzoda, and that the disastrous election result in 2015 was due to large scale voting fraud, part the Tajik ruler Emomali Rahmon's systematic plan to remove all opposition politicians.
