= Social Democratic Party (Tajikistan) =

Social Democratic Party of Tajikistan Ҳизби сотсиал-демократии Тоҷикистон
- Chairperson: Rahmatullo Zoirov
- Registered: 20 December 2002
- Ideology: Social democracy Progressivism; Secularism; Civic nationalism
- Political position: Centre-left
- International affiliation: Progressive Alliance

The Social Democratic Party (Tajik: Ҳизби сотсиал-демократии Тоҷикистон, romanized: Hizbi Sotsial-Demokratii Tojikiston) is a centre-left political party in Tajikistan registered on 20 December 2002 and was led by Rahmatullo Zoirov until his death on May 18th, 2024. The party is opposed to the authoritarian government led by the People's Democratic Party of Tajikistan, and has been recognized as the only Tajik party to explicitly oppose President Emomali Rahmon.

== History ==
The history of the party's creation dates back to 18 March 1998, when the future members of the SDP established Tajikistan's Party of Justice and Progress. The party was registered on 9 February 1999, only to be suspended on 2 September 1999, which prevented it from participation in the Tajik Presidential Election. The party was eventually registered under its current name on 20 December 2002.

The results at legislative elections, 27 February and 13 March 2005, are not available. One of the main opposition parties of Tajikistan, they boycotted both the 2006 and 2013 presidential elections. The party received 0.3 percent of the vote in the 2020 parliamentary election, winning no seats.
