= Amir Qaroqulov =

Tajikistani politician

Amir Qaroqulov was a presidential candidate in the 2006 Tajik presidential election, representing the Agrarian Party.
