= 2025 Tajik parliamentary election =

- 2 March 2025
- All 63 seats in the Assembly of Representatives; 32 seats needed for a majority
- Turnout: 85.35% (▼1.09pp)
Party	Leader	Vote %	Seats	+/–
PDP	Emomali Rahmon	52.45	49	+2
Agrarian	Rustam Latifzoda	21.25	7	0
PERT	Ghiyosiddin Ashurzoda	12.82	5	0
Socialist	Ghulom Khalimzoda	5.34	1	0
Democratic	Shahboz Abror	5.11	1	0
This lists parties that won seats. See the complete results below.

Parliamentary elections were held in Tajikistan on 2 March 2025 to elect the Assembly of Representatives. The elections took place without independent observers and turned up an expected landslide for the ruling People's Democratic Party.

== Electoral system ==
The 63 members of the Assembly of Representatives are elected by two methods: 41 members are elected in single-member constituencies using the two-round system, whilst 22 seats are elected by proportional representation in a single nationwide constituency, with an electoral threshold of 5%. Voters cast a single ballot for a candidate in their single-member constituency, with the total votes received across all constituencies used to determine the proportional seats. In each constituency, voter turnout is required to be at least 50% for the election to be declared valid.

== Results ==
Party	Votes	%	Seats			
Party	Votes	%	Constituency	Party list	Total	+/–
People's Democratic Party	2,435,541	52.45	37	12	49	+2
Agrarian Party of Tajikistan	986,887	21.25	2	5	7	0
Party of Economic Reforms	595,281	12.82	2	3	5	0
Socialist Party of Tajikistan	248,064	5.34	0	1	1	0
Democratic Party of Tajikistan	237,536	5.11	0	1	1	0
Communist Party of Tajikistan	89,738	1.93	0	0	0	–2
Against all	50,895	1.10	–	–	–	–
Total	4,643,942	100.00	41	22	63	0
Valid votes	4,643,942	98.54				
Invalid/blank votes	69,025	1.46				
Total votes	4,712,967	100.00				
Registered voters/turnout	5,522,038	85.35				
Source: The Times of Central Asia, Interfax

== Reactions ==
Russia, China and Tajikistan's Central Asian neighbours endorsed the election results, while the Organization for Security and Co-operation in Europe refused to send observers due to a lack of "formal guarantees" that they would be allowed to carry out their work. The Tajik electoral commission also did not issue accreditations to media outlets not affiliated with the Tajik government including the local branch of Radio Free Europe/Radio Liberty and Asia-Plus, citing administrative issues.
