= Shodi Shabdolov =

Tajikistani politician (1943–2023)

Shodi Shabdolov Шоди Шабдолов
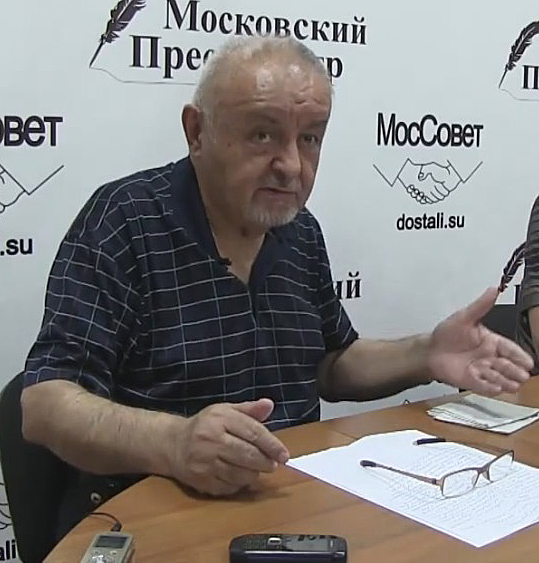

Chairman of the Communist Party of Tajikistan
- In office 4 September 1991 – 2 July 2016
- Succeeded by: Ismoil Talbakov

Personal details
- Born: Shodi Davlyatovich Shabdolov; 17 October 1943 Khorog, Gorno-Badakhshan, Tajik SSR, Soviet Union
- Died: 19 October 2023 (aged 80) Khorog, Gorno-Badakhshan, Tajikistan
- Party: CPSU (to 1991), Communist Party of Tajikistan

Shodi Davlyatovich Shabdolov (Tajik: Шоди Давлатович Шабдолов; 17 October 1943 – 19 October 2023) was a Tajik politician who was the chairman of the Communist Party of Tajikistan from 1991 until July 2016, when the party replaced him with Ismoil Talbakov.

== Life and career ==
Shodi Davlyatovich Shabdolov was born in Khorog, Gorno-Badakhshan on 17 October 1943.

Shabdolov was a member of the Parliament of Tajikistan.

Shabdolov was married. He died on 19 October 2023, at the age of 80.

== Sources ==
- "ҲИЗБҲО ВА ФРАКСИЯҲО" (in Tajik). Parliament of Tajikistan.
