= Democratic Party of Tajikistan =

Political party in Tajikistan

Democratic Party of Tajikistan Ҳизби демократии Тоҷикистон
- Abbreviation: DPT (English, Russian); HDT (Tajik)
- Leader: Shahboz Abror
- Founded: 5 August 1990
- Ideology: Liberal conservatism; Social conservatism; Tajik nationalism; Secularism
- Political position: Centre to centre-right
- Colors: Green
- Slogan: Пиндори нек, гуфтори нек, кирдори нек. Pindor-i nek guftor-i nek kardor-i nek. ('Good thoughts, good words, good deeds')
- Seats in the Assembly of Representatives: 1 / 63

The Democratic Party of Tajikistan (Note: Tajik: Ҳизби демократии Тоҷикистон, romanized: Hizbi Demokratiyi Tojikiston, IPA: [ˈhɪzbɪ dʲɪmɐˈkratʲɪjɪ tʰɔdʒikʰɪsˈtʰɔn]; Russian: Демократическая партия Таджикистана, romanized: Demokratičeskaja partija Tadžikistana) is a political party in Tajikistan founded in August 1990 by Mahmadruzi Iskandarov. Along with the other Tajik opposition parties, it was banned from July 1993 to August 1999.

Under the 30% quota provided by the Peace Agreement that concluded the Tajikistani Civil War, some party members were appointed to governmental and administrative posts. Iskandarov, who had been party chairman since its resumption in 1999, headed the state gas monopoly Tajikgaz from 2001 to 2003.

The party received no seats in the legislative elections held on 27 February and 13 March 2005, but percentages are not available. The party boycotted the 2006 Presidential election. On 15 April 2005, the party founder Mahmadruzi Iskandarov was taken by Russian security agencies, which has been considered illegal, in the town of Korolyov, and flown to Tajikistan and sentenced there to 23 years in jail. Following this, Saidjafar Usmonzoda was elected as the party's new leader.

On 14 June 2024, Usmonzoda was arrested for allegedly plotting to overthrow the government and subsequently sentenced to 27 years in prison.

== Election results ==
=== Presidential elections ===
Election	Party candidate	Votes	%	Result
2013	Saidjafar Ismanov	36,573	1.02%	Lost ✗

=== Assembly of Representatives elections ===
Election	Party leader	Votes	%	Seats	+/–	Position	Result
2000	Mahmadruzi Iskandarov	94,963	3.55%	0 / 63	0	▲4th	Extra-parliamentary
2005	Mahmadruzi Iskandarov			0 / 63	0	4th	Extra-parliamentary
2010	Saidjafar Usmonzoda	33,657	1.03%	0 / 63	0	▼6th	Extra-parliamentary
2015	Saidjafar Usmonzoda			1 / 63	▲1	6th	Support
2020	Saidjafar Usmonzoda	216,526	5.18%	1 / 63	0	▲5th	Support
2025	Shahboz Abror	237,536	5.11%	1 / 63	0	5th	Support
