= Party of Economic Reforms of Tajikistan =

Party of Economic Reforms of Tajikistan Ҳизби ислоҳоти иқтисодии Тоҷикистон
- Abbreviation: PERT (English and Russian); HIIT (Tajik)
- Leader: Giyosiddin Ashurzoda
- Founder: Olimjon Boboev
- Founded: 9 November 2005
- Headquarters: Dushanbe
- Newspaper: Economy and life
- Membership: >30.000
- Ideology: Social liberalism; Third Way; Agrarian reformism
- Political position: Centre
- National Assembly: 0 / 33
- Assembly of Representatives: 5 / 63

The Party of Economic Reforms of Tajikistan (PERT; Tajik: Ҳизби ислоҳоти иқтисодии Тоҷикистон, ҲИИТ, romanized: Hizbi islohoti iqtisodii Tojikiston, HIIT; Russian: Партия экономических реформ Таджикистана, ПЭРТ, romanized: Partiya ekonomicheskikh reform Tadzhikistana, PERT) is an officially registered centrist political party in Tajikistan.

The Party of Economic Reforms of Tajikistan was formed on November 9, 2005, by the rector of the Transport Institute of Tajikistan, Olimjon Boboev. According to Boboev: “We have studied the programs of all parties, but the tasks that we want to implement were not found there. Therefore, we have created our party to carry out those economic reforms that we consider necessary. " The party united in its ranks mainly scientists-economists and young professionals working in various sectors of the economy.

At the presidential election in 2006, the party nominated the leader of the party, Olimjon Boboev. The Central Election Commission of the Republic of Tajikistan officially registered Boboev as a presidential candidate. Olimjon Boboev proposed an agrarian reform, a revision of industrial policy, liberalization of the economy, as well as a solution to financial and economic problems in the country. According to the results of the elections, Boboev took a sensational second place, collecting 190 148 (6.2%) votes, letting the incumbent President of the Republic of Tajikistan - Emomali Rakhmonov, who received 79.3% of the vote.

In February 2010, PERT took part in the parliamentary election in Tajikistan for the first time. Following the elections, the party won 5.6% of the vote and entered the parliament of Tajikistan - Majlisi Oli. The party in the parliament of the country received the right to represent two representatives of PERT.

In 2013, at the presidential election in Tajikistan, the party again nominated the leader of the party, Olimjon Boboev. According to the results of the elections, Boboev took fifth place, collecting 140,733 (3.91%) votes.

In March 2015, PERT took part in the parliamentary elections in Tajikistan for the second time in its history. As a result of the elections, the party won 7.5% of the vote, taking third place, and entered the parliament of Tajikistan. The party in the country's parliament received the right to represent three representatives of the PERT.

== Election results ==
=== Presidential elections ===
Election	Party candidate	Votes	%	Result
2006	Olimzhon Boboyev	190,138	6.31%	Lost ✗
2013	Olimzhon Boboyev	140,733	3.91%	Lost ✗
2020	Rustam Rahmatzoda	90,918	2.17%	Lost ✗

=== Assembly of Representatives elections ===
Election	Party leader	Votes	%	Seats	+/–	Position	Result
2010	Olimzhon Boboyev	165,324	5.06%	2 / 63	New	▲5th	Support
2015	Olimzhon Boboyev			3 / 63	▲1	▲3rd	Support
2020	Rustam Qudratov	705,252	16.88%	5 / 63	▲2	▲2nd	Support
2025	Giyosiddin Ashurzoda	595,281	12.82%	5 / 63	0	▼3rd	Support
