= Abduhalim Ghafforov =

Tajikistani politician

Abduhalim Ghafforov (sometimes Abdukhalim Gafforzoda, Tajik: Абдуҳалим Ғаффорзода) is a Tajik politician, who's best known for being the presidential candidate of the Socialist Party in the 2006, 2013 and 2020 presidential elections. He is an Education Ministry official and he leads the officially registered Socialist Party.
