= Socialist Party of Tajikistan =

Socialist Party of Tajikistan Ҳизби Сотсиалистии Тоҷикистон
- Abbreviation: SPT (English, Russian); HST (Tajik)
- Leader: Ghulom Khalimzoda
- Founder: Safarali Kenjayev
- Founded: 15 June 1996
- Registered: 6 August 1996
- Split from: Popular Front of Tajikistan
- Newspaper: Ittixod
- Ideology: Socialism
- Political position: Left-wing
- Assembly of Representatives: 1 / 63

The Socialist Party of Tajikistan (Tajik: Ҳизби Сотсиалистии Тоҷикистон, romanized: Hizbi Sotsialistii Tojikiston; Russian: Социалистическая партия Таджикистана, romanized: Sotsialisticheskaya partiya Tadzhikistana) is a left-wing political party in Tajikistan. The party was founded on 15 June 1996, and registered on 6 August the same year. The party publishes Ittixod (Иттиход). The chairman of the party, Safarali Kenjayev, was assassinated in Dushanbe in 1999. Prior to his murder, there had been speculations that he might have intended to run for president.

In early 2004, the party was divided, with two groups claiming the name 'Socialist Party of Tajikistan'. One group was led by Abduhalim Ghafarov, a Ministry of Education official, and Kurbon Vosiev, a presidential adviser. The other group was led by Mirhuseyn Narziev. The Ghafarov-led group, which supports the government, obtained the legal registration.

== Election results ==
=== Presidential elections ===
Election	Party candidate	Votes	%	Result
2006	Abduhalim Ghafforov	85,295	2.83%	Lost ✗
2013	Abduhalim Ghafforov	54,148	1.50%	Lost ✗
2020	Abduhalim Ghafforov	63,082	1.51%	Lost ✗

=== Assembly of Representatives elections ===
Election	Party leader	Votes	%	Seats	+/–	Position	Result
2000	Abduhalim Ghafforov	37,728	1.41%	0 / 63	0	▲5th	Extra-parliamentary
2005	Abduhalim Ghafforov			0 / 63	0	▼6th	Extra-parliamentary
2010	Abduhalim Ghafforov	18,029	0.55%	0 / 63	0	▼8th	Extra-parliamentary
2015	Abduhalim Ghafforov			1 / 63	▲1	▲4th	Support
2020	Abduhalim Ghafforov	218,696	5.23%	1 / 63	0	4th	Support
2025	Ghulom Khalimzoda	248,064	5.34%	1 / 63	0	4th	Support
