= Agrarian Party of Tajikistan =

Political party in Tajikistan

Agrarian Party of Tajikistan Ҳизби аграрии Тоҷикистон Аграрная партия Таджикистана
- Abbreviation: APT (English and Russian); HAT (Tajik)
- Leader: Rustam Latifzoda
- Founder: Amir Qaroqulov
- Founded: 15 November 2005; 20 years ago
- Headquarters: Dushanbe
- Newspaper: Mehrgon
- Membership (2020): 55,000
- Ideology: Agrarianism
- Political position: Centre
- Colours: Yellow; Tajik national colours: Red; White; Green
- Slogan: «The best profession in the world is dehkanism» (Tajik: «Беҳ аз санои олам деҳқон аст»)
- Assembly of Representatives: 7 / 63

Website
- agrarian.tj

The Agrarian Party of Tajikistan (APT; Tajik: Ҳизби аграрии Тоҷикистон, romanized: Hizbi agrarii Toçikiston; Russian: Аграрная партия Таджикистана, romanized: Agrarnaya partiya Tadzhikistana) is a political party in Tajikistan founded on 15 November 2005. The party's headquarters are located in the centre of Dushanbe, and the party's youth wing is based at the Tajik Agrarian University in northern Dushanbe. The chief of the APT is Rustam Latifzoda.

== History ==
=== Founding ===
The Agrarian Party was founded on November 15, 2005 by the famous academician, professor and doctor of agricultural sciences Amir Qaroqulov, who united the leadership and activists of the Academy of Agricultural Sciences of Tajikistan around the new party. That month, the party was registered with the Ministry of Justice. As its main goals, the party put forward actions to sharply increase the area of agricultural land, reform dehkhans and farms.

=== Leadership ===
Qaroqulov remained the party's chairman until his death in March 2014, following which Rustam Latifzoda was elected the party's first deputy head. Latifzoda also serves as a member of the parliament's lower chamber.

=== Platform ===
The Agrarian Party has been described as having "no clear ideological outline", and instead acting as an agricultural production-focused single-issue party. They support a shift in Tajik production and trade policies, to place greater emphasis on exporting finished products rather than raw materials, which presently constitute a majority of the nation's exports. The party is regarded as supporting the leadership of Tajik president Emomali Rahmon.

=== Electoral history ===
In Tajikistan's 2010 parliamentary elections, the party won two out of 63 seats in the Assembly of Representatives. In the 2020 elections, the party increased their standing in the assembly to seven members.

== Election results ==
=== Presidential elections ===
| Election | Party candidate | Votes | % | Result |
|---|---|---|---|---|
| 2006 | Amir Qaroqulov | 156,991 | 5.21% | Lost ✗ |
| 2013 | Talibek Buhariyev | 166,224 | 4.61% | Lost ✗ |
| 2020 | Rustam Latifzoda | 128,182 | 3.06% | Lost ✗ |

=== Assembly of Representatives elections ===
| Election | Party leader | Votes | % | Seats | +/– | Position | Result |
|---|---|---|---|---|---|---|---|
| 2010 | Amir Qaroqulov | 166,935 | 5.11% | 2 / 63 | New | ▲4th | Support |
| 2015 | Amir Qaroqulov | | | 5 / 63 | ▲3 | ▲2nd | Support |
| 2020 | Rustam Latifzoda | 700,582 | 16.77% | 7 / 63 | ▲2 | ▼3rd | Support |
| 2025 | Rustam Latifzoda | 986,887 | 21.25% | 7 / 63 | 0 | ▲2nd | Support |
