= 1995 Tajik parliamentary election =

Parliamentary elections were held in Tajikistan on 26 February 1995, with a second round in 20 of the 181 constituencies on 12 March. A total of 354 candidates ran for the 181 seats, although 40% were won uncontested. The Communist Party of Tajikistan remained the largest party, although independents won the majority of seats. Voter turnout was 84%.

== Results ==
Party	Votes	%	Seats
Communist Party of Tajikistan			60
People's Party of Tajikistan			5
Party of Popular Unity and Accord			2
Tajikistan Party of Economic and Political Renewal			1
Independents			113
Total			181
Total votes	2,254,560	–	
Registered voters/turnout	2,684,000	84.00	
Source: Nohlen et al.
