= Olimzhon Boboyev =

Tajikistani politician (born 1952)

Olimjon Boboyev Олимҷон Бобоев

Personal details
- Born: January 5, 1952 (age 74) Hisor
- Party: Party of Economic Reforms of Tajikistan

Olimjon Boboyev (Tajik: Олимҷон Бобоев; born in Hisor, January 5, 1952) is a Tajik politician who is opposed to the rule of current President Emomali Rahmon. The leader of the Party of Economic Reforms, he was the main opposition candidate in Tajikistan's 2006 presidential election. According to official publications, he gained 6.2% of the popular vote.

He is the founder of the Party of Economic Reforms of Tajikistan.
