= Islamic Renaissance Party of Tajikistan =

Banned political party in Tajikistan

Islamic Renaissance of Tajikistan
- Tajik name: Ҳизби Наҳзати Исломии Тоҷикистон
- Russian name: Партия Исламского возрождения Таджикистана
- Abbreviation: IRT
- Chairman: Islomjon Saidov
- Deputy Chairman: Sayidumara Husayn
- Founded: 6 October 1990 (36 years, 43 days) (underground formation) 26 October 1991 (35 years, 23 days) (founding Congress)
- Banned: 29 September 2015 (11 years, 50 days)
- Headquarters: Dushanbe
- Newspaper: Najot ("Salvation")
- Membership (2015): 40,000 (claimed)
- Ideology: Islamism; Anti-communism
- Religion: Sunni Islam
- International affiliation: Muslim Brotherhood
- Designated as a terrorist group by: Tajikistan

Party flag

The Islamic Renaissance Party of Tajikistan (Note: Tajik: Ҳизби Наҳзати Исломии Тоҷикистон, romanized: Hizbi Nahzati Islomiyi Tojikiston, Persian alphabet: حزب نهضت اسلامی تاجیکستان, IPA: [ˈhɪzbɪ nɐɦˈzatʰɪ ɪslɔˈmijɪ tʰɔdʒikʰɪsˈtʰɔn]; Russian: Партия исламского возрождения Таджикистана, romanized: Partija islamskogo vozroždenija Tadžikistana) also known as the Islamic Revival Party of Tajikistan, is a banned Islamist political party in Tajikistan. Until 2015, when it was designated a terrorist organisation, it was the only legal Islamist party in Central Asia.

== History ==
The party was established in 1990, and had its founding congress the following year. In 1992, it hosted a conference in Saratov, Russia, attended by Islamists from ex-Soviet central Asia, Tatarstan and Bashkortostan. When Tajikistan became independent, the party was banned in 1993. After the ban of the party, majority of opposition forces fled to neighboring Afghanistan where they established the Movement for Islamic Revival in Tajikistan (MIRT), headed by Said Abdullo Nuri. It fought with the United Tajik Opposition and the Garmi people against the government during the Tajik Civil War but was legalised following peace accords in 1998. In 1999 it was the second largest party in Tajikistan.

The party's long-running leader, Said Abdullo Nuri, died in August 2006 of cancer. The party boycotted the 2006 presidential election.

At the legislative elections held 27 February and 13 March 2005 the party won 8% of the popular vote and 2 out of 63 seats.

At the elections held on 1 March 2015 the Party failed to surpass the 5% vote barrier, losing its only 2 seats in Parliament.

The party was deregistered by Tajikistan's interior ministry in 2015 and then banned a month later, after being designated as a terrorist organisation by the country's Supreme Court. Two of the party's leaders were subsequently sentenced to life in prison by the Supreme Court, after being accused of being linked to an alleged failed coup d'état attempt led by former deputy Defence Minister Abduhalim Nazarzoda, who was killed alongside several dozen of his supporters while attempting to forcefully take control over a police station. The party denied being linked to Nazarzoda's attack.

A year after its ban, a 2016 Tajik constitutional amendment prohibited the establishment of any political party based on a religious platform, effectively preempting any attempt to reorganise the party.

In a 15 August 2018 Washington Post story, regional expert Paul Stronski, a Senior Fellow in the Russia and Eurasia program at the Carnegie Endowment for International Peace, said a 31 July 2018 attack on seven Western cyclists in Tajikistan was being blamed on members of the party even though Islamic State claimed responsibility for the attack. Other news reports noted that the five attackers appeared in a video released by Daesh after the attack pledging allegiance to the group and its leader Abu Bakr al-Baghdadi.

In 2018, the IRPT, whose leaders were by then based largely out of Poland, became one of the founding organisations of National Alliance of Tajikistan, an opposition coalition of four Tajik political movements.

== Claims of state pressure ==
In April 2014, the party denounced official harassment and alleged government attempts to undermine their credibility and electoral chances, as parliamentary elections were scheduled in 2015. In the runup to 1 March 2015 legislative elections, a wide-ranging government-induced campaign, to demonise the party and bar its candidates from entering the contest, was reported.

On 28 August 2015, the government of Tajikistan demanded the party halt its "illegal activities" as it attempted to hold a party congress. The party claimed that the government was attempting to close it down.

== Election results ==
=== Assembly of Representatives elections ===
Election	Leader	Votes	%	Seats	+/–	Position	Result
2000	Sayid Abdulloh Nuri	196,105	7.33%	2 / 63	New	3rd	Opposition
2005	Sayid Abdulloh Nuri			2 / 63	0	3rd	Opposition
2010	Muhiddin Kabiri	268,596	8.22%	2 / 63	0	▲2nd	Opposition
2015	Muhiddin Kabiri	63,161	1.67%	0 / 63	▼2	▼7th	Extra-parliamentary

== See also ==
- Muhammad Sharif Himmatzoda
- List of Islamic political parties
