= Assembly of Representatives (Tajikistan) =

Lower house of the Tajik legislature

Coordinates: 38.5739°N 68.7878°E

Assembly of Representatives Маҷлиси намояндагон Палата представителей

Type
- Type: Lower house of the Supreme Assembly of Tajikistan

History
- Founded: 6 November 1994

Leadership
- Chairman of the Assembly of Representatives: Fayzali Idizoda, PDPT since 19 March 2025

Structure
- Seats: 63
- Political groups: Government (49): People's Democratic Party (49); Others (14): Agrarian Party (7); Party of Economic Reforms (5); Socialist Party (1); Democratic Party (1)
- Length of term: 5 years

Elections
- Voting system: Mixed member majoritarian: Two-round system: 41 seats; Proportional representation with 5% electoral threshold: 22 seats
- First election: 26 February 1995
- Last election: 2 March 2025

Meeting place
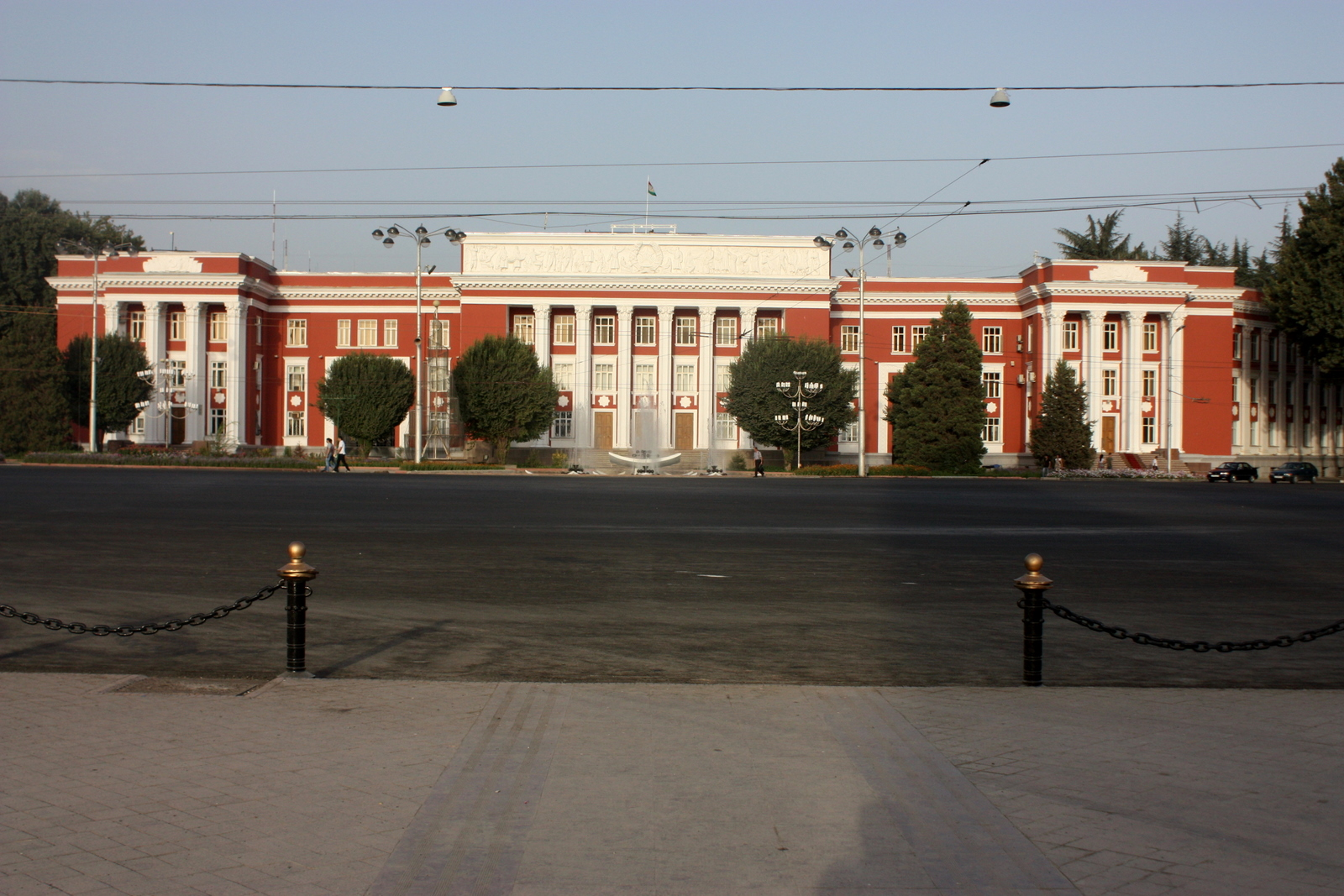
- Parliament Building; Dousti Square, Dushanbe, Tajikistan

Website
- www.parlament.tj

The Assembly of Representatives (Tajik: Маҷлиси намояндагон, romanized: Majlisi namoyandagon; Russian: Пала́та представи́телей, romanized: Palata predstaviteley) is the lower house of the bicameral Supreme Assembly of Tajikistan. The People's Democratic Party of Tajikistan has been the dominant party in the legislature since 2000.

== Membership, and qualifications ==
=== Electoral system ===
Members of the Assembly of Representatives are elected by two methods; 41 members are elected in single-member constituencies using the two-round system, whilst 22 are elected by proportional representation in a single nationwide constituency, with an electoral threshold of 5%.

== Structure ==
=== Council of the Assembly of Representatives ===
Name	Title
Fayzali Idizoda	Chairman
Shermuhammad Shohiyon	First Deputy Chairman
Muini Mavsuma Muinzoda	Deputy Chairman
Giyozoda Aziz Qodir	Deputy Chairman
Shohmurod Rustam	Chairman of the Committee on Legislation and Human Rights
Nasrullo Mahmudzoda	Chairman of the Committee on Law and Order, Defense and Security
Ghiyosiddin Ashurzoda	Chairman of the Committee on Economics and Finance
Rustam Latifzoda	Chairman of the Committee on Agrarian Issues, Water and Land Resources
Mahmadshoh Gulzoda	Chairman of the Committee on International Affairs, Public Associations and Information
Barno Saidvalizoda	Chairman of the Committee on Science, Education, Culture and Youth Policy
Mujibakhon Javhari	Chairman of the Committee on Social Issues, Family and Health Protection
Ilhom Kamolzoda	Chairman of the Committee on State Structure and Self Government
Muhamadullo Sheralizoda	Chairman of the Committee on Energy, Industry, Construction and Communications
Orif Amirzoda	Chairman of the Ecology Commission
Shuhrat Ghanizoda	Chairman of the Commission on Control of Guidelines and Organization of Work

=== Committees and factions ===
==== Committees ====
- Committee on Legislation and Human Rights
- Committee on Law and Order, Defense and Security
- Committee on Economy and Finance
- Committee on Agrarian Issues, Water and Land Resources
- Committee on International Affairs, Public Associations, and Information
- Committee on Science, Education, Culture and Youth Policy
- Committee on Social Issues, Family, and Health Protection
- Committee on Energy, Industry, Construction, and Communications
- Committee on State Structure and Local Self-Government
- Ecology Commission
- Commission on the Ethics of Deputies
- Commission on Control of Guidelines and Organization of Work

==== Factions and Parliamentary Groups ====
- Faction of the People’s Democratic Party of Tajikistan
- Faction of the Agrarian Party of Tajikistan
- Faction of the Party of Economic Reforms of Tajikistan
- Group of Independent Deputies

=== Support services ===
- Assembly of Representatives Office
  - Department of Record Keeping, Control and Reception of Citizens
  - Law Department
  - Translation and Editing Department
  - Department of International and Inter-Parliamentary Relations, Protocol and Organization of Work
  - Department of Information and Communication Technologies
  - Economic and Service Department
  - Press Division
  - Organizational Division
  - Financial Department
  - Sector for Supporting the Activities of Committees and Commissions
- Secretariat of the Leadership
- Personnel and Special Affairs Division

== Chairmen ==
President	Took office	Left office
Saidullo Khairullaev	27 March 2000	16 March 2010
Shukurjon Zuhurov	16 March 2010	17 March 2020
Mahmadtohir Zokirzoda	17 March 2020	19 March 2025
Fayzali Idizoda	19 March 2025	Incumbent

== 2025 Tajik parliamentary election ==
Party	Votes	%	Seats			
Party	Votes	%	Constituency	Party list	Total	+/–
People's Democratic Party	2,435,541	52.45	37	12	49	+2
Agrarian Party of Tajikistan	986,887	21.25	2	5	7	0
Party of Economic Reforms	595,281	12.82	2	3	5	0
Socialist Party of Tajikistan	248,064	5.34	0	1	1	0
Democratic Party of Tajikistan	237,536	5.11	0	1	1	0
Communist Party of Tajikistan	89,738	1.93	0	0	0	–2
Against all	50,895	1.10	–	–	–	–
Total	4,643,942	100.00	41	22	63	0
Valid votes	4,643,942	98.54				
Invalid/blank votes	69,025	1.46				
Total votes	4,712,967	100.00				
Registered voters/turnout	5,522,038	85.35				
Source: The Times of Central Asia, Interfax
