= Communist Party of Tajikistan =

Political party in Tajikistan

Communist Party of Tajikistan Ҳизби коммунистии Тоҷикистон (Tajik) Коммунистическая партия Таджикистана (Russian)
- Abbreviation: CPT (English); HKT (Tajik); KPT (Russian)
- Leader: Central Committee
- Founded: 6 December 1924 (101 years, 341 days)
- Headquarters: Fatekh Niyazi 37, Dushanbe 734002
- Membership (2025): 50,000
- Ideology: Communism; Marxism–Leninism; Left-conservatism; Soviet patriotism
- Political position: Left-wing
- National affiliation: Communist Party of the Soviet Union (until 1991)
- Regional affiliation: UCP–CPSU
- Colours: Red
- Slogan: "Workers of the world, unite!"
- Anthem: "The Internationale"
- Assembly of Representatives: 0 / 63

The Communist Party of Tajikistan (Note: Tajik: Ҳизби Коммунистии Тоҷикистон, romanized: Hizbi Kommunistiyi Tojikiston, [ˈhɪzbɪ kəmʊˈnʲistɪjɪ tʰɔdʒikʰɪsˈtʰɔn]; Russian: Коммунистическая партия Таджикистана, romanized: Kommunističeskaja partija Tadžikistana) is the oldest political party in Tajikistan. The party was founded on 6 December 1924 and was the ruling party of the Tajik Autonomous Soviet Socialist Republic from 1924 to 1929 and the Tajik Soviet Socialist Republic from 1929 to 1990. It was the Tajik branch of the Communist Party of the Soviet Union until the Soviet Union dissolved in 1991. At present, the party is affiliated with the Union of Communist Parties – Communist Party of the Soviet Union.

The CPT is a based on the concept of democratic centralism, a principle conceived by Russian Marxist Vladimir Lenin, that entails democratic and open discussion of policy issues within the party followed by the requirement of total unity in upholding the agreed policies. The highest institution of the party was the Party Congress, which elects the Central Committee. In between party congresses, the Central Committee is the highest decision-making organ regarding party affairs. After a party congress, the Central Committee elects the Politburo and Secretariat, as well as the First Secretary, the highest party officer.

The party is committed to communism and participates in the International Meeting of Communist and Workers' Parties, an annual international forum of communist parties. According to the party statute, the party adheres to Marxism–Leninism, based on the writings of Vladimir Lenin and Karl Marx, and formalized under Joseph Stalin. The party had pursued state socialism, under which all industries were nationalized and a command economy was introduced. Prior to the adoption of central planning in 1929, Lenin had introduced a mixed economy, commonly referred to as the New Economic Policy, in the 1920s, which allowed to introduce certain capitalist elements in the Soviet economy. This changed upon the ascension of Mikhail Gorbachev in 1985 when he and his allies envisioned the introduction of an economy similar to Lenin's earlier New Economic Policy through a program of "perestroika", or restructuring. However, the reforms lead to the unraveling of the CPT amid the 1990 Dushanbe riots, as well as the brief banning of the party and the dissolution of the Soviet Union in 1991.

The party managed to remain in power until the 2000 Tajik parliamentary election, when it was overtaken by the People's Democratic Party of Tajikistan. However, the party improved when it won 13.97% of the popular vote and 4 out of 63 seats in the 2005 election.

== History ==
=== Soviet era ===
The first social democratic groups arose in Tajikistan during the 1905 Russian Revolution and by late 1917 and early 1918, Bolshevik organizations were created in Khodjent, Ura-Tyube, Penjikent, and Shurab. On 6 December 1924, the government formed the Organizing Bureau of the Central Committee of the Communist Party of Uzbekistan in the Tajik Autonomous Soviet Socialist Republic. The first Tajik party conference was held between 21 and 27 October 1927. On 25 November 1929, by the decision of the Politburo of the CPSU, the CPT was formed by separation from the CPU. In 1975, the CPT had more than 94,000 members.

==== Regional and city committees ====
- Dushanbe City Committee
- Garm Regional Committee
- Gorno-Badakhshan Regional Committee *Kulyab Regional Committee
- Kurgan-Tyubinsk Regional Committee *Stalinabad Regional Committee
- Ura-Tyuba Regional Committee

=== Post-independence ===
After Tajikistan became independent, the party voted to rename itself the Socialist Party of Tajikistan to circumvent the ban placed on it. However, by December 1991, the ban on the activities of the Communist Party had been lifted. During the Tajikistani Civil War, the CPT supported the government and the Popular Front of Tajikistan. At present, the Communist Party of Tajikistan supports the government of Emomali Rahmon. Beginning in the 2000s, the CPT lost the majority of its electorate, with today's electorate of the party being made up mainly of people of retirement age.

== Leaders ==
=== First Secretary of the Communist Party of Tajikistan (1924–1991) ===
No.	Picture	Name (Birth–Death)	Took office	Left office	Political party
First Secretary
1		Chinor Emomov (1898–1939)	1924	1927	CPSU
2		Mumin Khojaev (?–?)	1927	1928	CPSU
3		Ali Shervoni (?–?)	1928	1929	CPSU
4		Shirinsho Shotemur (1899–1937)	1929	1930	CPSU
5		Mirza Huseynov (1894–1938)	1930	1933	CPSU
6		Grigory Broydo (1883–1956)	1933	1934	CPSU
7		Suren Shadunts (1898–1938)	1934	1936	CPSU
8		Urunboi Ashurov (1903–1938)	1936	1937	CPSU
9		Dmitri Protopopov (1897–1986)	1937	1946	CPSU
10		Bobojon Ghafurov (1908–1977)	1946	1956	CPSU
11		Tursun Uljabayev (1916–1988)	1956	1961	CPSU
12		Dzhabar Rasulov (1913–1982)	1961	1982	CPSU
13		Rahmon Nabiyev (1930–1993)	1982	1985	CPSU
14		Qahhor Mahkamov (1932–2016)	1985	1991	CPSU

=== Second Secretaries ===
- Shirinsho Shotemur (1930–1932)
- Ibrahim Ismailov (1932–1934)
- Saifullo Abdulloev (1936–1937)
- Petru Lucinschi (1986–1989)

=== Chairman of the Communist Party of Tajikistan (1991–present) ===
No.	Picture	Name (Birth–Death)	Took office	Left office
Chairman
1		Shodi Shabdolov (1943–2023)	4 September 1991	2 July 2016
2		Ismoil Talbakov (1955–2016)	2 July 2016	17 December 2016
3		Mirzoazim Nasimov (?–?)	17 December 2016	22 April 2017
4		Miroj Abdulloyev (1948–2026)	22 April 2017	7 April 2026

== Election results ==
=== Presidential elections ===
Year	Party candidate	Votes	%	Result
1991	Rahmon Nabiyev	1,321,189	60.4%	Elected ✓
2006	Ismoil Talbakov	159,493	5.2%	Lost ✗
2013	Ismoil Talbakov	181,675	5.04%	Lost ✗
2020	Miroj Abdulloyev	49,535	1.18%	Lost ✗

=== Assembly of Representatives elections ===
Year	Leader	Votes	%	Seats	+/–	Position	Outcome
1995	Shodi Shabdolov		33.1%	60 / 181	New	▲1st	Plurality
2000	Shodi Shabdolov	547,076	20.39%	13 / 63	▼47	▼2nd	Opposition
2005	Shodi Shabdolov	533,066	20.63%	4 / 63	▼9	2nd	Opposition
2010	Shodi Shabdolov	229,080	7.01%	2 / 63	▼2	▼3rd	Opposition
2015	Shodi Shabdolov	86,060	2.32%	2 / 63	0	▼5th	Opposition
2020	Miroj Abdulloyev	132,049	3.11%	2 / 63	0	▼6th	Opposition
2025	Miroj Abdulloyev	89,738	1.93%	0 / 63	▼2	6th	Extra-parliamentary

== See also ==
- First Secretary of the Communist Party of Tajikistan
