= People's Democratic Party of Tajikistan =

People's Democratic Party of Tajikistan Ҳизби халқии демократии Тоҷикистон
- Abbreviation: PDPT (English); HXDT (Tajik); NDPT (Russian)
- Leader: Emomali Rahmon
- Founder: Abdulmajid Dostiyev
- Founded: 10 December 1994 (31 years, 241 days)
- Headquarters: Kohi Vahdat, Dushanbe
- Newspaper: Minbari Khalq (People's Tribune)
- Youth wing: Sozandagoni Vatan (Creators of the Motherland)
- Ideology: Tajik nationalism Statism
- Political position: Centre-right
- International affiliation: For the Freedom of Nations!
- Colours: Red White Green; Orange
- Assembly of Representatives: 49 / 63

Website
- hkhdt.tj

The People's Democratic Party of Tajikistan (PDPT; Tajik: Ҳизби халқии демократии Тоҷикистон, romanized: Hizbi xalqii demokratii Tojikiston) has been the dominant and ruling party of Tajikistan since 2000. Founded in 1994 by Abdulmajid Dostiev as the People's Party of Tajikistan, the seat of the party is located in the Palace of Unity in Dushanbe, the capital of Tajikistan. Since April 1998, the leader of the party has been the President of Tajikistan, Emomali Rahmon.

A centre-right party, its stated aims are creating a "sovereign, democratic, secular, socially-oriented and unitary state with a stable economy". The statute also refers to "hopes for improving the well-being of society, protecting the interests of citizens, regardless of their social status, nationality or religious preferences". The party is authoritarian.

== International cooperation ==
The Palace of Unity, the headquarters of the People's Democratic Party of Tajikistan

The People's Democratic Party of Tajikistan has bilateral cooperation with foreign political parties including the Russia's ruling party United Russia, with the ruling Amanat in Kazakhstan, with the ruling New Azerbaijan Party, and with the Chinese Communist Party.

== Party newspaper ==
The party newspaper of the PDPT is Minbari Khalq (People's Tribune), published in Tajik, Russian and Uzbek languages twice a week, with a circulation of approximately 30,000 copies. Additionally, the party publishes socio-political magazines, including Mehvar and other magazines.

== Election results ==
=== Presidential elections ===
Election	Party candidate	Votes	%	Result
1994	Emomali Rahmon	1,434,437	59.5%	Elected ✓
1999	Emomali Rahmon	2,749,908	97.6%	Elected ✓
2006	Emomali Rahmon	2,419,192	79.3%	Elected ✓
2013	Emomali Rahmon	3,023,754	83.92%	Elected ✓
2020	Emomali Rahmon	3,837,927	92.07%	Elected ✓

=== Assembly of Representatives elections ===
Election	Leader	Votes	%	Seats	+/–	Position	Result
1995	Emomali Rahmon			5 / 181	New	2nd	Opposition
2000	Emomali Rahmon	1,741,540	65.1%	36 / 63	▲31	▲1st	Majority government
2005	Emomali Rahmon	1,666,909	58.9%	52 / 63	▲16	1st	Supermajority government
2010	Emomali Rahmon	2,321,436	71.0%	54 / 63	▲2	1st	Supermajority government
2015	Emomali Rahmon	2,472,262	62.5%	51 / 63	▼3	1st	Supermajority government
2020	Emomali Rahmon	2,139,741	51.2%	47 / 63	▼4	1st	Supermajority government
2025	Emomali Rahmon	2,435,541	52.5%	49 / 63	▲2	1st	Supermajority government
