= Terrorism in Tajikistan =

Terrorism in Tajikistan stems largely from the forces of the political opposition who opposed the comprehensive peace agreement that ended the civil war in 1997. President Emomali Rahmonov and UTO leader Said Abdullah Nuri signed the agreement on 27 June, believing it would bring an end to hostilities. However, dissident Islamist militants led by Tohir Yo‘ldosh and Juma Namangani formed the Islamic Movement of Uzbekistan in 1998, allying with Al-Qaeda and vowing to unite Central Asia as an Islamic state. The latest terror attacks took place in the Qabodiyon District on November 6, 2019, when a policeman and a border guard were killed by several Islamic State militants. 15 terrorists were also killed.

== Banned terrorist organizations ==
Prosecutor-General Bobojon Bobokhonov announced on 15 January 2007 that the Tajik Supreme Court added ten entities to the Tajik government's list of banned terrorist organizations at the end of 2006. Groups the Supreme Court added include the Islamic Party of Turkestan, Khaar Dimna and Tochikistoni Ozod.

=== Islamic Movement of Uzbekistan ===
Six members of the Islamic Movement of Uzbekistan and Hizb ut-Tahrir allegedly attacked Kyrgyz and Tajik border posts in Batken on 12 May 2005, killing several border guards. Their hearings on 29 August 2006 were brief because lawyers for two of the defendants and some witnesses did not go to court. One of the defendants is a woman and one is a Tajik citizen.

On 12 May 2006, the anniversary of the 2005 border attack and the Andijan massacre in Uzbekistan, several militants attacked Tajik border guards before passing into Kyrgyzstan, killing three Tajik guards and a Kyrgyz customs official. More than 200 Kyrgyz security forces tracked down the militants, killing four and camen. Khunoynazar Assozadeh, a spokesman for the Tajik Interior Ministry, gave an initial statement saying that more than six militants of an unknown organization "attacked a border post near the village of Lakkon, which is in the Isfarah district of Tajikistan's Soghd province, from Kyrgyz territory. They shot and killed two of [our] border guards and wounded another. They also seized 19 automatic rifles and one heavy-caliber machine gun before [returning to] Kyrgyzstan and heading toward [Kyrgyzstan's] Batken region." Sadyrbek Dubanayev, deputy commander of Kyrgyz border forces, disagreed with Assozadeh's account, saying, "Right now [12 p.m., Bishkek time] fighting between those criminals and [our] border guards is continuing. One criminal was killed, and the rest of the group– three or four individuals– are trying to escape toward the mountains." Dubanayev also said militants had attacked Uzbek border guards the night before. The Tajik and Kyrgyz governments later said the militants were members of the Islamic Movement of Uzbekistan.

Tohir Abdujabbor, an expert based in the Khujand, said Kyrgyz President Kurmanbek Bakiyev's shakeup of the government possibly led to the attack. He also said criminal groups had divided the area between each other and may have taken advantage of the situation. Tashtemir Eshaliyev, head of security in the Batken Province, said the militants were from Kanibadam, Sogdh Province whose actions were tied to the anniversary of the Andijan massacre and said they were members of Hizb ut-Tahrir. Qosimshoh Iskandarov, chairman of the Center for the Study and Prevention of Conflicts, a Tajik think tank, said, "Today's attacks could be the work of either Islamic groupings or criminal gangs involved in drug-smuggling operations. I know some people– many, in fact– are suggesting that those events may be the work of secret services or governments in the region. But I don't think government structures are involved."

Tajik Interior Minister Humdin Sharifov told journalists during a press conference in Dushanbe on 17 July that police had arrested 10 IMU members so far that year. Sharifov attributed two bombings in Dushanbe in January and June 2005, an attack on an Interior Ministry building in Qayroqqum in January, and the assassination of a Defense Ministry official to IMU members who trained in Afghanistan and entered Tajikistan through Uzbekistan. He had earlier stated on 17 April that four IMU members were arrested and two more suspects were wanted in connection with the 2005 bombings which killed one person.

Police arrested four suspected IMU members in Soghd Province on 14 July. Security forces raided their homes, finding "laptops with files containing texts of a religious and extremist nature calling for jihad, a DVD with a call for 'holy war,' and extremist literature in the Uzbek language." When seven convicted IMU members were sentenced on 22 May, Sughd prosecutor Abdughaffor Qalandarov said the cell had planned to attack sites in Tajikistan and had links to the late IMU leader Juma Namangani. The seven maintained their innocence and said they were tortured to make them confess.

Mahmadsaid Juraqulov, head of the anti-organized crime department in the Interior Ministry of Tajikistan, told reporters in Dushanbe on 16 October 2006 that the "[Islamic Movement of Turkmenistan] is the Islamic Movement of Uzbekistan," and that Uzbek secret services manufactured the change in name. Juraqulov also said that the IMT is not a major security threat to Tajikistan or Kyrgyzstan. "Everyone knows that it is in Uzbekistan that [the IMU] wants to create problems. For them, Tajikistan and Kyrgyzstan are just regrouping bases they're trying to reach."

==== 2010 bombing ====
The government blamed the IMU for a suicide car bombing of a police station in Khujand on September 3, 2010. Two policemen were killed and 25 were injured.

=== Hizb ut-Tahrir ===
Hizb ut-Tahrir activity is primarily in northern Tajikistan near the Fergana Valley. The Tajik government arrested 99 members of Hizb ut-Tahrir in 2005, sixteen of whom were women, and 58 members in 2006. Out of the 92 extremist suspects detained in 2006, 63% were suspected of membership in Hizb ut-Tahrir. The government detained 10% more extremists in 2006 than in 2005.

==== 2006 ====
The Khujand city court sentenced ten men, who had called for the government to be overthrown, to jail terms ranging from 9 to 16 years for membership in HuT on 19 May 2006. Two members of HuT in Khujand were sentenced on 7 June to 10 and 13 years in prison and were barred from engaging in public religious activities for five years following their release. Makhmadsaid Jurakulov, Chief of Police in Soghd, announced on 31 July 2006 that police had detained Moghadam Madaliyeva, the suspected leader of Hizb ut-Tahrir's female organization in the north. Tajik police arrested 92 terrorists in 2006, 58 of whom were members of HuT. Russia's Federal Security Service arrested Rustam Muminov, a member of Hizb ut-Tahrir who fought against the Tajik government in the civil war, on 17 October 2006. The FSB deported Muminov to Tashkent, Uzbekistan on 27 October. The FSB said Muminov "participated in military operations and punitive expeditions against supporters of the Tajik president and took part in the smuggling of weapons, narcotics, and gold into Tajikistan from Afghanistan" during the civil war. The Uzbek government wanted him extradited for his alleged involvement in the 2005 civil unrest in Uzbekistan.

==== 2007 ====
On 26 January 2007 a Tajik court found HuT member Makhmudzhon Shokirov guilty of "publicly calling for violent change of the constitutional order in Tajikistan" and "inciting ethnic, racial, and religious enmity," sentencing him to ten and a half years imprisonment. Iso Tavakkalov, judge of the Chkalovsk court in northern Tajikistan, told journalists on 5 April that 31-year-old Akmal Akbarov had been found guilty of violating Articles 307, 187, and 189 of the criminal code for his membership in Hizb ut-Tahrir. The court sentenced him to nine years and nine months of imprisonment and ordered the state to confiscate his property. Tavakkalov said the court considered Akbarov's apology and his three children when sentencing.

=== Sughd bunkers ===
In late 2006 Tajik police found an underground bunker used by militants in the Sughd Region. The police found banned terrorist literature, audio and video tapes advocating terrorism, instructions on bomb manufacture, instructions on the use of Kalashnikov and other arms, and a map of Sughd. Tajik security forces found another bunker, 15 meters long, along with explosives near Isfara, on 29 January 2007. The Sughd region's Prosecutor General office said it believed Militant members of the HT, the IMU, and possibly other terrorist organizations targeting the governments of Tajikistan and Uzbekistan used the bunker.The Police are interrogating suspects.

=== Islamic State of Iraq and the Levant ===
Two Americans, a Swiss and a Dutch national were killed and two others injured in a terrorist attack in the Danghara district. A car hit the cyclists and then the occupants of the vehicle got out and stabbed them. Four terrorists involved in the attack were later killed by police officers, who were also attacked and injured with knives by the attackers, while another was injured and arrested.The Islamic State claimed responsibility for the attack and released a video of the five attackers who pledged allegiance to the terror group.

== Cooperation with NATO member states ==
The governments of Tajikistan and the United States plan to hold their first joint counter-terrorism drill from 28 January to 9 March 2007 at the military range in Fakhrabad military training center.The United States Marines will train Tajik border guards and Special Forces in counter-terrorism operations.

== Cooperation with SCO member states ==
=== Marzbon-2006 ===
Border guards and officials from the defense, interior, and emergencies ministries, migration officials, and counternarcotics officials of the governments of Kyrgyzstan, Tajikistan, Kazakhstan, Uzbekistan, and Russia held joint counterterrorism and counternarcotics exercises entitled "Marzbon-2006" on 7–8 August 2006.

=== Xinjiang terror threat ===
The Chinese and Kyrgyz governments increased security along their borders with each other and Tajikistan on 11 January 2007 after Chinese government officials expressed concern that "international terrorists" were traveling through Xinjiang and Central Asia to carry out attacks. The warning followed a high-profile raid on a training camp in Akto County, Xinjiang run by East Turkestan Islamic Movement members. General Sadyrbek Dubanayev, deputy chief of Kyrgyzstan's border guards, said, "After the announcement of the special operation by the Chinese side, we briefed everyone [security authorities on the Kyrgyz side] and then Kyrgyzstan and China decided to increase security along the border."

President Rahmonov addressed representatives of SCO member states in St. Petersburg, Russia on 7 June 2002. He warned that the three evils were still a danger to Afghanistan's security and that they are fueled by "hunger, misery and poverty" in addition to drug trafficking. He urged SCO members to support the Afghan government to deter terrorism. He also expressed his support for the establishment of the Regional Anti-Terrorism Structure force.

The Tajik Defense Ministry held their first joint counterterrorism drill with China, entitled "Cooperation-2006," from 21–23 September 2006 on the Mumirak training grounds, in the Khatlon region, Tajikistan. Defense Ministry spokesman Faridun Muhammadaliev said Chinese special forces worked with Tajik air and land forces with the Tajik army "contributing ground forces artillery, one special forces company of its rapid-reaction-force brigade, and one air forces company." The drill took place under the auspices of the Shanghai Cooperation Organisation.

== Legislation ==
Several articles of Tajikistan's Criminal Code bar terrorism and other actions connected to revolutionary activities. Article 307 of the code bans "public calls for overthrow of the constitutional regime of the Republic of Tajikistan." Article 187 forbids "organizing a criminal organization." Article 189 prohibits "inciting ethnic, communal or religious hatred."

== See also ==
- List of journalists killed in Tajikistan
