= Juma Namangani =

Uzbek Islamist militant (1969–2001)

- Born: Jumaboe Ahmadjonovich Khodjiyev; 12 June 1969; Namangan, Uzbek SSR, Soviet Union
- Died: 9 November 2001 (aged 32); Afghanistan
- Military career
- Allegiance: Soviet Union (1987–1988); Mujahideen (1988–1992); Islamic Renaissance Party (1992–1997); Islamic Movement of Uzbekistan (1998–2001)
- Nicknames: Jumma Hakim, Jumma Kasimov, Tojiboy
- Wars: Soviet–Afghan War; Tajikistani Civil War; War in Afghanistan †

Jumaboi Ahmadjonovich Khodjiyev (12 June 1969 – 9 November 2001), better known by the nom de guerre Juma Namangani, was an Uzbek Islamist militant with a substantial following who co-founded and led the Islamic Movement of Uzbekistan (IMU) with Tohir Yo'ldosh. The IMU received substantial Taliban patronage, and was allowed to operate freely in northern Afghanistan.

== Biography ==
Namangani was born in Namangan, located in the Fergana Valley, on 12 June 1969. He fought in the Soviet–Afghan War as a paratrooper in the Soviet Army, into which he had been conscripted in the late 1980s. Following the war, he returned to Namangan. There, he associated with local Islamists of the Islamic Renaissance Party (IRP) and the local Islamic revolutionary party Adolat (English: Justice), including Tohir Yoʻldosh, a mullah who sought the imposition of Sharia (Islamic law) in Uzbekistan. Together with Yoʻldosh, he helped found the Islamic organization Tovba (English: Generation).

=== Tajikistani Civil War ===
Namangani fled to southern Tajikistan in 1992, following a crackdown on Adolat by the government of Islam Karimov, with a group that included roughly thirty Uzbek fighters and a few Arab intermediaries between Adolat and Saudi Arabian financiers. There, he recruited Uzbeks fleeing the crackdown, commanding about two hundred within a few months, as well as Arabs disillusioned with the infighting among Mujahideen forces in Afghanistan.

With support from the IRP, which supplied Tajik fighters, Namangani's group established a base of operations in the Tavildara Valley and fought in the Tajikistani Civil War in support of the United Tajik Opposition (UTO), temporarily occupying the town of Tavildara on two occasions. Namangani opposed the peace agreement signed between the UTO and the government of Emomali Rahmon in June 1997, but eventually demobilized most of his fighters while sustaining a core group of supporters in his Tavildara Valley stronghold. He bought and operated a farm in the village of Hoit and also owned lorries that transported goods to the Tajik capital, Dushanbe; he is also alleged to have trafficked heroin from Afghanistan through Tajikistan to European markets.

During the Civil War, Namangani was an effective commander due to his first-hand knowledge of both Soviet Army and Afghan Mujahideen tactics, which were practised by the Tajikistani military and Russian forces based in the country. According to various IRP leaders, Namangani was "a tough disciplinarian and good speaker who could mobilize people" and held the loyalty of his fighters; however, he was also described to be "erratic, temperamental, and authoritarian", and frequently ignored orders from the party's political leadership.

He is essentially a guerrilla leader, not an Islamic scholar. He is a good person but not a deep person or intellectual in any way, and he has been shaped by his own military and political experiences rather than by Islamic ideology, but he hates the Uzbek government—that is what motivates him above all. In a way, he is a leader by default, because no other leader is willing to take such risks to oppose Karimov.

— Moheyuddin Kabir, Islamic Renaissance Party

=== Islamic Movement of Uzbekistan ===
In August 1998, Namangani and Yoʻldosh founded the Islamic Movement of Uzbekistan (IMU) with the aim of creating a militant Islamic opposition to Karimov in Uzbekistan. Yoʻldosh traveled to Afghanistan to establish contacts with the Taliban and al-Qaeda but Namangani remained in Tajikistan. In the summer of 1999, the IMU infiltrated southern Kyrgyzstan, near Osh and later Batken, and seized Kyrgyz and foreign hostages, including a major general and four Japanese geologists, sparking clashes with the Kyrgyz Army. As winter approached, the IMU retreated to the Tavildara Valley. Uyghurs, Chechens, Uzbeks, Tajiks, Kyrgyz, Kazakhs and other ethnic groups flocked to serve under IMU leader Juma Namangani.

These raids had a major impact in Central Asia, and resulted in considerable international pressure on Tajikistan, not least from Karimov, to expel the IMU from its base in the Tavildara Valley. The IRP persuaded their former ally Namangani to leave in late 1999, and in November approximately three hundred IMU fighters, and their families, were escorted by Russian troops to the border with Afghanistan, where they were welcomed by the Taliban and lodged in Mazar-i-Sharif. In return for sanctuary and freedom to operate against Uzbekistan, the IMU supported the Taliban against the Northern Alliance. Namangani and Yoʻldosh frequently visited Kandahar to meet Osama bin Laden and Mullah Omar "to plan strategy and negotiate for arms, ammunition, and money". Namangani reportedly raised more than US$20 million from bin Laden in early 2000, and another US$15 million from foreign financiers, with which he equipped and trained his forces. The IMU also funded itself through the opium trade—according to Interpol's Ralf Mutschke, 60 percent of exports of opium produced in Afghanistan transited through Central Asia, and Namangani's group may have controlled 70 percent of that trade.

In July 2000, Namangani returned to the Tavildara Valley with several hundred fighters, and from there covertly deployed his fighters into Uzbekistan and Kyrgyzstan. In Uzbekistan, heavy fighting took place in the southeastern Surxondaryo Region for a month before the military forced the IMU's fighters to retreat from their mountain strongholds to Tajikistan. In Kyrgyzstan, Namangani's fighters kidnapped ten mountain climbers, including four Americans, who were freed following clashes with the military. These incursions prompted the United States to designate the IMU a Foreign Terrorist Organization on 25 September. Also in late 2000, Namangani was sentenced to death, along with Yoʻldosh, by Uzbekistan following a trial in absentia for involvement in the 1999 Tashkent bombings. According to the United States Department of State, the trial "failed to conform to international standards for the protection of the human rights of the defendants", and specifically the International Covenant on Civil and Political Rights.

Namangani withdrew to the IMU's base in Mazar-i-Sharif in October 2000. At the time, he commanded a capable, multinational force of 2,000 Kyrgyz, Tajik, Uzbek, Chechen and Uyghur fighters—the latter from the Xinjiang autonomous region of China. In December, Namangani led some three hundred fighters into Tajikistan, and to Tavildara, once more. However, following intense pressure from Karimov and the international community, members of the Tajikistani government once again convinced him to return to Afghanistan, which he did again in January 2001—this time through an airlift conducted by Russian transport helicopters. Before his departure, he married his second wife, a Tajik widow of a fighter killed during the Tajikistani Civil War and mother of two sons.

The IMU resumed offensive operations in the summer of 2001, with locally based sleeper cells attacking two military posts on the Kyrgyzstan–Tajikistan border and a Kyrgyz television transmitter in late July. The attacks suggested that Namangani wielded "a new, independent command structure that could operate without his presence". By late 2001, Namangani led a force of 3,000–5,000 fighters, who trained with and fought alongside the Taliban against local and foreign anti-Taliban forces during the invasion of Afghanistan by the United States.

== Death ==
Namangani was reportedly killed in an airstrike in Afghanistan in November 2001. Rumors of his death started in mid-November 2001 but were inconsistent about the circumstances, location and timing. General Abdul Rashid (Abdurashid) Dustum of the Northern Alliance claimed Namangani died during fighting for the city of Kunduz. The Taliban, however, claimed he died in an airstrike in or near Kabul, the Afghan capital, and was buried secretly in Logar Province. Pakistani journalist Hamid Mir reported that Namangani died on 6 November 2001 in Mazar-i-Sharif and was eulogized, together with Mohammed Atef, in a speech by Osama bin Laden on 8 November 2001.

In late December, in a joint press conference with Karimov, Rahmon claimed having "accurate and reliable information" of Namangani's death. General Tommy Franks, who led the American invasion of Afghanistan, stated in a press conference in Tashkent on 24 January 2002 that "the information that I have reflects that Namangani is dead", and in a later conference (again in Tashkent) on 23 August 2002 expressed that "the information that ... we've had for some time indicates that he probably is not still alive". However, a report by the National Security Council of Kyrgyzstan in July 2002 stated that Namangani "had recovered from wounds sustained the previous winter and was gathering forces in the Badakhshan region of Afghanistan".
