= Islamic Movement of Tajikistan =

Militant Islamist organization in Tajikistan

The Islamic Movement of Tajikistan (Tajik: Ҳаракати исломии Тоҷикистон) or Harakati Islami Tajikistan is the branch of the Islamic Movement of Central Asia and an Islamist militant organization, that operates in Tajikistan. The IMCA, and by extension the IMT, is affiliated with Al Qaeda.

Intelligence analysts in the United States Guantanamo Bay detainment camp say it is linked to terrorism.

The now deceased leader of the Islamic Movement of Tajikistan, Tohir Yo‘ldosh, also had led Islamic Movement of Uzbekistan.

== History of The Islamic Movement of Tajikistan ==
The terrorist organization known as The Islamic Movement of Tajikistan was founded in 2009. The group was founded by its parent organization, The Islamic Movement of Central Asia. The organization was founded in the borders of Tajikistan. Upon founding, Tohir Yo'ldosh was appointed the leader. After the founding of the group the organization took roots and set up a base of operations in Afghanistan.

== Organization leaders ==
Tohir Yo'ldosh is the only known and documented leader of The Islamic Movement of Tajikistan. Tohir Yo'ldosh is also documented as being the leader of another terrorist organization known as The Islamic Movement of Uzbekistan.

== Claimed attacks ==
The Islamic Movement of Tajikistan has claimed responsibility for one attack. The attack was carried out in 2009 and targeted the police force of Central Asia. In the planned attack, the organization used a bomb as their weapon. In the attack, there were between 11–50 civilian casualties. And one Central Asia police officer was killed. About 50 people were injured as a result of the attack.

== Organization Member Activity / Convictions ==
During the Tajikistan civil war in the early 1990s, the Islamic Movement of Tajikistan (IMT) became a notable military group. The conflict involved government forces and their supporters fighting against a group of opposition parties, including the United Tajik Opposition (UTO), which included both secular nationalist and Islamist groups. The IMT allied itself with the UTO during the war.

The war was marked by brutal violence and atrocities committed by both sides, including massacres of civilians, torture, and extrajudicial killings. The conflict came to an end in 1997 with the signing of a peace agreement between the government and the UTO, which paved the way for a power-sharing arrangement between the two sides.

In 2004 authorities of Tajikistan arrested a radical Islamic activists in the northern territories of Tajikistan. The terrorist organization member was accused of propagating radical and militant Islamic ideas, he was also accused of recruiting members into the terrorist organization. In 2004, the courts of Tajikistan convicted several Islamic extremist organization members on the grounds of anti-constitutional activities as well as, attempts to topple the government.

In 2010 there was an attack against Tajik security forces in eastern Tajikistan. The Islamic Movement of Tajikistan and The Islamic Movement of Uzbekistan were thought to be responsible. However, no official connection between the attack and the Islamic Movement of Tajikistan or its allegiances could be made.

== Allegiances ==
The Islamic Movement of Tajikistan can be linked to other terrorist organizations such as The Islamic Movement of Central Asia, The Islamic Movement of Uzbekistan, and Al-Qaida. The commonality between The Islamic Movement of Tajikistan's known alliances are that they are Islamic extremist groups that operate within the Middle East. The terrorist organizations have been known to share resources and assist one another in carrying out attacks.

== Culpability for attacks ==
The Islamic Movement of Tajikistan has been accused of one attack, aside from their one claimed attack on the police force of Central Asia. Subject matter experts do believe that the Islamic Movement of Tajikistan is connected to the attacks that are known to have been carried out by partner organizations. The organization is believed to be connected to attacks carried out by the Islamic Movement of Central Asia, as well as, the Islamic Movement of Uzbekistan.
