= Islamic Movement =

Islamic Movement can refer to Islam or Islamism in general, or to any of several religious or political organizations:

- Islamic Movement of Afghanistan
- National Islamic Movement of Afghanistan
- Students Islamic Movement of India
- Movement of 15 Khordad, AKA Islamic Movement of Iran
- Islamic Movement in Israel
- Islamic Movement of Bangladesh
- Islamic Movement of Kurdistan
- Islamic Movement (Nigeria)
- Islamic Movement of Tajikistan
- East Turkestan Islamic Movement
- Islamic Movement of Uzbekistan
- Islamic State of Iraq and the Levant
- "Global Islamic Movement", see Institute of Contemporary Islamic Thought
