= United Nations Mission of Observers in Tajikistan =

United Nations peacekeeping operation in Tajikistan from 1994 to 2000

The United Nations Mission of Observers in Tajikistan (UNMOT) was a peacekeeping mission established by the United Nations Security Council in December 1994, and its mandate expired in May 2000. Its purpose was to monitor peace agreements during and after the Tajikistan Civil War. The observers were first deployed in the wake of the ceasefire, in 1994, between the ruling government of Tajikistan, led by Emomali Rahmonov, and the United Tajik Opposition. After the UN-sponsored armistice ended the war in 1997, the UN expanded the mission's original mandate to monitor the peace and demobilization. The mission was headquartered in Dushanbe, Tajikistan.

== Development of United Nations involvement ==
Tajikistan was in a state of political turmoil for months after the Tajik Soviet Socialist Republic declared independence from the Soviet Union in September 1991. The United Tajik Opposition, an alliance of democratic, liberal and Islamic forces were able to take power in mid-1992 for a short time, after which Emomali Sharipani Ramona's government forces were able to regain control militarily. According to the United Nations, "by mid-1993, in a country of under 6 million, an estimated 50,000 people, mostly civilians, had been killed, some 600,000 had been displaced internally, and an additional 60,000 had crossed the border into northern Afghanistan." Although most organized hostilities had ended by the end of 1993, UTO insurgents continued to fight Tajik government forces and their Russian Federation allies along the Tajik-Afghan border. The first peacekeeping forces, the Commonwealth of Independent States Collective Peacekeeping Forces in Tajikistan, were organized in late 1993, with forces contributed by Kazakhstan, Kyrgyzstan, the Russian Federation, Tajikistan and Uzbekistan.

There were a number of regional attempts at peace in 1992 and 1993, none of which were particularly successful. After a direct appeal by Uzbekistan president Islam Karimov, United Nations Secretary-General Boutros Boutros-Ghali sent missions to the area for fact-finding and observation of the humanitarian situation. Subsequently, Boutros-Ghali authorized a Special Envoy for Tajikistan to seek an immediate ceasefire and negotiations between the two sides and neighboring nations. In September 1994, after talks in Moscow and Tehran, the Tehran Agreement (or the Agreement on a Temporary Ceasefire and the Cessation of Other Hostile Acts on the Tajik-Afghan Border and within the Country for the Duration of the Talks) was signed, with the stipulation that the ceasefire would be enacted as soon as UN peacekeeping observers were deployed. It went into effect 20 October 1994, after the first 15 observers arrived. The United Nations Security Council then began considering deployment of a peacekeeping mission to the area to investigate and report of ceasefire violations. Resolution 968 (1994) of 16 December 1994 formally established the United Nations Mission of Observers in Tajikistan.

Initially, UNMOT was planned to exist for only six months when it was established, however it was extended several times to observe the progress of peace. In July 1995, the opposition forces began to return to central Tajikistan from Afghanistan, and fierce clashes erupted thereafter until December 1996, when a general ceasefire was once again in place. In 1997, the secretary-general recommended that UNMOT should be strengthened. UNMOT extended several times until May 2000, constrained by the progress of peace.

== Personnel ==
UNMOT personnel consisted of military observers and both international and local civilian staff, as well as two civilian police officers after July 1998. The military observers came from 15 foreign countries, Austria, Bangladesh, Bulgaria, Czech Republic, Denmark, Ghana, Hungary, Indonesia, Jordan, Nepal, Nigeria, Poland, Switzerland, Ukraine, and Uruguay. Though it began with an initial deployment of only 40 military observers (excluding civilian staff and police), the number was increased to its highest strength of 81 after the armistice, and reached its lowest strength of 17 at the time of UNMOT's withdrawal.

== Fatalities ==
The mission suffered 7 fatalities, 3 military and 4 civilian. The most noted incident was on July 20, 1998, when four UNMOT members, Major Ryszard Szewczyk from Poland; Major Adolfo Scharpegge from Uruguay; Yutaka Akino from Japan; and Jourajon Mahramov from Tajikistan, were murdered near the city of Garm in central Tajikistan. The same day the entire UN system, as well as many international NGO's suspended operations and withdrew personnel from Tajikistan.
