= Haji Akbar Turajanzade =

Tajikistani politician (born 1954)

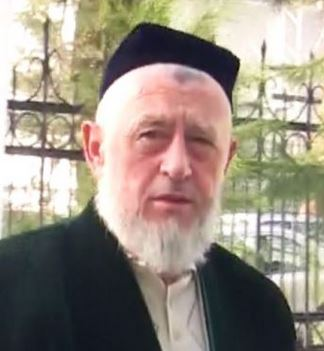
Image of Haji Akbar Turajanzade

Haji Akbar Turajanzade (Tajik: Ҳоҷӣ Акбар Тураҷонзода; born Akbar Turaevich Qahhorov Tajik: Акбар Тӯраевич Қаҳҳоров in 1954) is a Senator in the National Assembly of Tajikistan. He served as the Qazi Qalon, the highest Muslim authority in Tajikistan, from 1988 to 1991. He served as the second-in-command of the Islamic Renaissance Party of Tajikistan and the United Tajik Opposition from 1993 until his expulsion from the party in 1999. He served as the First Deputy Prime Minister in the Tajik government after the civil war.

== Biography ==
Turajonzoda was born in the Kofarnihon District near Dushanbe in the Tajik SSR, in a family of Sufi dignitaries. He studied in Bukhara, Tashkent and Amman, Jordan. He served in the Department of International Relations in the Spiritual Administration of Muslims in Central Asia in Tashkent, Uzbek SSR from 1985 to 1987. He left Tajikistan in 1992 when the civil war began, visiting Iran, the Arab world, the United States, Europe, Russia, and Uzbekistan. UTO leader Said Abdullah Nuri and Turajonzoda led the UTO from Afghanistan and Iran during the civil war, returning to Tajikistan in February 1998.

== Comments on Hizb ut-Tahrir ==
He has called Hizb ut-Tahrir, an international Islamist organization, a threat to Tajikistan's stability. He claimed HT is Western-sponsored and that it wants to "remak[e] Central Asia... A more detailed analysis of HT's programmatic and ideological views and concrete examples of its activities suggests that it was created by anti-Islamic forces. One proof of this is the comfortable existence this organization enjoys in a number of Western countries, where it has large centers and offices that develop its concept of an Islamic caliphate."

Turajonzoda praised Nuri following his death, saying, "Mentor Nuri had a very unique nature. He did a lot of good things during his short life. He was one of those personalities who, firstly, strived to prevent the civil war in 1992, and then tried to return [the country to] peace and stability. After the war was imposed on us, and we had not other choice, we tried together with him to reach a fair peace deal so that our refugees could return from Afghanistan to Tajikistan with honor."

== Call for amnesty ==
On 12 March 2007 he called on the Rahmonov administration to grant a general amnesty for all involved in the civil war on the 10th anniversary of the signing of the Comprehensive Peace Agreement. "Originally [the amnesty] was Nuri's idea... The talk was of an amnesty for those people who are still in jail. I proposed to him that there should be a full amnesty, and he accepted this wholeheartedly but added that we should also include the liquidation of those criminal cases still pending against all leaders of the opposition." He criticized war-time convictions, saying the evidence often did not prove the charges.

Shodi Shabdolov, the leader of the Communist Party, and Abduqayum Yusufov, the chairman of Tajikistan's Independent Lawyers' Association, support the amnesty proposal.
