= IMCA =

IMCA may refer to:

- Independent Mental Capacity Advocate, a service defined in the Mental Capacity Act 2005
- International Marine Contractors Association, a trade association for offshore, marine and underwater engineering companies
- International Management Centres Association, an unaccredited institution of higher education based in Buckingham, UK
- International Motor Contest Association, a United States racing sanctioning body
- Investment Management Consultants Association (IMCA), the organization that confers the financial certifications of Certified Investment Management Analyst (CIMA) and Certified Private Wealth Advisor (CPWA)
- Islamic Movement of Central Asia, a guerrilla organization
