= Otakhon Latifi =

Tajik journalist and politician

- Отахон Латифӣ
- Born: March 18, 1936; Panjakent, Tajik SSR, USSR
- Died: September 22, 1998 (62 years old); Dushanbe, Tajikistan

Otakhon Latifi (Tajik:Отахон Латифи) (March 18, 1936 – September 22, 1998) was a noted journalist and politician from Tajikistan.

== Early life ==
He was born in the town of Pendjikent. Under the Soviet Union, he was both Pravda and Izvestiya's correspondent in Tajikistan at various times. He also served as head of the Union of Journalists of Tajikistan.

== Career ==
Latifi branched into politics in 1989, becoming deputy chairman of the Tajik Council of Ministers. He became involved in the peace process that followed the country's bloody post-independence civil war. In 1992, he became Deputy Prime Minister, as part of Tajikistan's national reconciliation government.

Over time, Latifi became a prominent opposition figure, as a senior member in the United Tajik Opposition. This led to a period in exile in Tehran and Moscow between 1992 and 1997 during the Tajikistani civil war. While in Moscow, on August 4, 1994, Latifi was badly beaten outside his Moscow apartment, and key documents relating to the peace process were stolen.

On his return to Tajikistan in September 1997, he chaired the panel for legal issues under the National Reconciliation Commission, a role which he continued until his death.

== Death ==
On September 22, 1998, at around 8am, Latifi was shot at point blank range outside his apartment in Dushanbe.

== Legacy ==
His murder sparked condemnation from both the government and opposition, United Nations Secretary-General Kofi Annan and the non-government organization Human Rights Watch. His death was also mentioned in Time Magazine.

The murder, which all parties to the conflict agreed was politically motivated, also resulted in the UTO's eventual suspension of their role in the government, temporarily bringing the peace process to the point of collapse.

There is still some speculation as to who killed Latifi. Crime figure Abdullo Tursunov was tried and found guilty in June 2000. However, two years before, in January 1998, another man, Ravshan Gafurov was captured by police, and promptly confessed. Gafurov was later killed by police after attempting to escape custody. Tajik police had also claimed that the murder, and several other similar killings, were linked to Islamic Renaissance Party Chairman Said Abdullo Nuri.
