= Islamic Movement of Central Asia =

Islamist organization in Central Asia

The Islamic Movement of Central Asia (IMCA) is an Islamist organization affiliated with Al Qaeda, which was headed by Tohir Yo‘ldosh, that has operated in Central Asia since its formation on 16 September 2002. Its objective is to create a pan-Central Asian Islamist theocracy.

IMCA members include Kyrgyz, Tajik, Uzbek, Chechen, and Uyghur militants.

Kyrgyz Defense Minister Esen Topoyev said there were several hundred Islamic militants and terrorist bases in Badakhshan Province, Afghanistan, and 1,500 terrorists in Paktia Province, as recently as September 2002.

Tohir Yo‘ldosh was also the leader of the Islamic Movement of Uzbekistan, the Uzbek division of the IMCA.

== See also ==
- Terrorism in Kazakhstan
- Islamic Movement of Tajikistan
- Islamic Movement of Uzbekistan
