= United Nations Security Council Resolution 968 =

UN Security Council Resolution 968
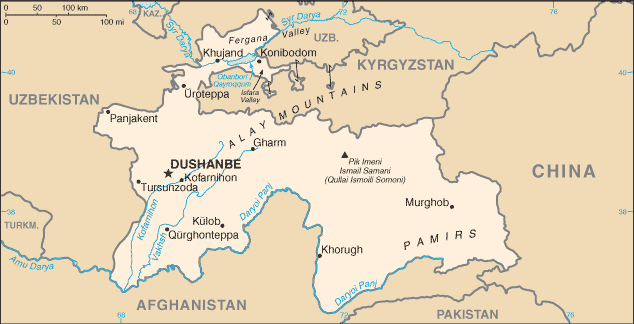
- Tajikistan (pre-2011 borders)
- Date: 16 December 1994
- Meeting no.: 3,482
- Code: S/RES/968 (Document)
- Subject: Tajikistan
- Voting summary: 15 voted for; None voted against; None abstained
- Result: Adopted

Security Council composition
- Permanent members: China; France; Russia; United Kingdom; United States
- Non-permanent members: Argentina; Brazil; Czech Republic; Djibouti; New Zealand; Nigeria; Oman; Pakistan; Rwanda; Spain

United Nations Security Council resolution 968, adopted unanimously on 16 December 1994, after noting statements by the president of the security council and reports by the Secretary-General Boutros Boutros-Ghali on the situation in Tajikistan, the council established the United Nations Mission of Observers in Tajikistan (UNMOT) and addressed the process of national reconciliation in the country.

== Background ==
Tensions began in the spring of 1992 after opposition members took to the streets in demonstrations against the results of the 1991 presidential election. Ethnic groups from the Garm and Gorno-Badakhshan regions, which were underrepresented in the ruling elite, rose up against the national government of President Rahmon Nabiyev, in which people from the Leninabad and Kulyab regions dominated. The opposition fought under the banner of the United Tajik Opposition, which turned to rebels in Afghanistan for military aid.

== Resolution ==
=== Observations ===
There were talks underway between the government and opposition in Tajikistan. There was a temporary ceasefire in force and an extension of the talks were agreed in agreements signed in Islamabad, Pakistan and Tehran, Iran. There was a protocol signed on a Joint Commission to implement the agreements. The primary responsibility of the Tajik parties was to resolve their differences and that the provision of international assistance must be linked to the process of national reconciliation which included free and fair elections and confidence-building measures. The commitment of both parties to resolve the conflict was welcomed. Peacekeepers from the Commonwealth of Independent States would co-operate with the United Nations peacekeeping force in monitoring the ceasefire.

=== Acts ===
The Security Council then established UNMOT, consisting of 40 military observers, and 18 international and 26 local staff, with the following mandate:

(a) to assist the Joint Commission in the implementation of the political agreements;
(b) to investigate and report on ceasefire violations;
(c) to mediate with the Tajik parties and peacekeeping forces in the country;
(d) to support the efforts of the Secretary-General's Special Envoy;
(e) to co-operate in the distribution of humanitarian assistance.

The mission was established for an initial period of six months but would only be extended beyond 6 February 1995 when the parties extended agreements on a durable ceasefire, reconciliation and the promotion of democracy. Tajikistan was called upon to enter into a Status of Mission Agreement with the United Nations. The Government of Tajikistan and United Tajik Opposition had to reach a political agreement as soon as possible.

The release of prisoners of war on 12 November 1994 in Khorugh was welcomed and further confidence-building measures were called for. Unhindered access from the International Committee of the Red Cross to the prisoners of war was urged. All countries were asked to co-operate in the reconciliation process in Tajikistan and to provide humanitarian assistance. The Secretary-General Boutros Boutros-Ghali was asked to set up a fund to which voluntary contributions could be made.

== See also ==
- History of Tajikistan
- List of United Nations Security Council Resolutions 901 to 1000 (1994–1995)
