= Hizb ut-Tahrir (Bangladesh) =

Bangladeshi chapter of the international pan-Islamist terror organisation Hizb ut-Tahrir

Hizb ut-Tahrir (Bangladesh) حزب التحرير
- Leader: Global leader, Ata Abu Rashta
- Founder: Global founder, Taqiuddin al-Nabhani
- Banned: October 22, 2009; 17 years ago
- Ideology: Pan-Islamism; Islamism; Caliphalism; Salafism; Anti-secularism; Anti-Western sentiment Anti-democracy
- Religion: Sunni Islam
- International affiliation: Hizb ut-Tahrir
- Slogan: "মুক্তির এক পথ, খিলাফত! খিলাফত।" (translation: One way to Liberation, Caliphate! Caliphate!)

Flag

Website
- ht-bangladesh.info

Hizb ut-Tahrir (Arabic: حزب التحرير, lit. 'Party of Liberation'; Bengali: হিযবুত তাহরীর, romanized: Hijbut tāharīr bānlādēś) is a global pan-Islamist and fundamentalist organization which was established in Bangladesh in 2001. The organization was banned by the government of Bangladesh under the Anti-Terrorism Act. It is affiliated with its international counterpart, Hizb ut-Tahrir, and the regional branch, Hizb ut-Tahrir Central Asia.

== Founding and growth ==
The Bangladeshi branch of Hizb ut-Tahrir (HTB) was founded on November 17, 2001, by Syed Golam Mowla, a professor of management at the University of Dhaka (DU). He first encountered the parent organization in 1993 while in London for his doctoral studies, as two of its members were holding an open discussion in Regent's Park. By 1997 he returned to Bangladesh and joined DU where he began to recruit other faculty members. In 2000, his colleagues from London returned to Bangladesh and together they set up the first HTB office in Dhaka.

One of the early members was Mohiuddin Ahmed, a fellow IBA professor. Ahmed was among those who after the founding, presided over the first seminar, which was attended by 30-50 people. The first leadership committee comprised 13 members and was formed in 2004.

The organization recruited primarily from university students, claiming about 5000 members by February 2006. HTB became known for engaging in student politics, holding seminars and study circles to spread its message. Along with its base in DU, the organization also spread to private universities such as North South University (NSU) and Independent University, Bangladesh (IUB). Leaflet campaigns and study groups based out of prayer rooms occurred.

== Arrests and banning ==
On September 19, 2008, Mowla and nine other members (four teachers, including Mowla, and six students) were arrested by the Rajshahi Metropolitan Police for distributing leaflets calling for a rebellion to overthrow the government in favor of the caliphate. They arrived to hold a press conference at a local press club but found the police waiting for them. While in custody, Mowla denied accusations of militancy, stating that the group wished to establish Islamic rule democratically, also stating that "speaking against any ruler or their system of ruling is a democratic right of every citizen." Ahmed, who was by then the chief coordinator of HTB, denounced the "puppet" caretaker government and threatened to instigate more political agitation at universities if the men were not released in 48 hours. The state sought to charge them with sedition, but the HTB members petitioned the courts for their release, and they were granted bail on September 30.

In March 2009 at least 27 members of HTB — mostly university students — were charged with handing out leaflets encouraging sedition among military personnel, thus helping to instigate the Bangladesh Rifles revolt a few weeks earlier. The whole organization was banned by the Awami League-led government on October 22, 2009, for posing "a threat to public security", as well as allegations of "anti-state, anti-government, anti-people and anti-democratic activities". However, the organization has never been implicated in any terrorist acts.

Ahmed condemned the ban, claiming that the organization rejected terrorism and accusing the government of trying to silence them for exposing the government's "pro-imperialist stance". The next day, on October 23rd, he attempted to hold a press conference at his home only for the police to arrive and disperse it. He was placed on compulsory leave from DU on October 25th. Authorities arrested him and Mowla in April 2010, though Ahmed was released on bail in 2012 and worked to regain his position at DU, claiming to have broken ties with HTB. On February 9, 2013, he and 5 other men faced multiple charges under the Anti-Terrorism Act, including allegedly threatening public security and sovereignty. At the end of the trial in March 2019, he was acquitted of all charges along with 3 others.

== Post-ban activities ==
Despite its banned status, the group has been linked to various violent incidents and radical activities. It has continued recruitment operations through methods such as online propaganda, leaflet distribution, and the infiltration of university campuses. HTB has also been alleged to maintain ties with certain government officials, security personnel, and academic figures who facilitate its recruitment efforts, particularly among educated youth and students at institutions such as the University of Dhaka.

The group supported certain members of the Bangladesh Army during a coup attempt in 2011. In October 2014, members of the group clashed with police after an improvised bomb was allegedly thrown in Muhammadpur, Dhaka. On June 15, 2016, Golam Faizullah Fahim, a member of the group, was arrested following an attempted assassination of a Hindu college professor in Madaripur. Golam later died in police custody in what authorities described as a "gunfight with police." The group has pledged legal aid to members captured by law enforcement agencies and offered support to their families should they sacrifice their lives in terrorist attacks. As of 2016, 650 members of the group had been arrested, 400 of whom were later released on bail. The group frequently conducts protests outside mosques and maintains a well-established online presence.

In January 2016, six members of HTB were expelled from Dhaka University. Around the same time, a resurgence in recruitment was reported. In October 2016, HTB urged members of the Bangladesh Army to engage in military action against Myanmar in response to the Rohingya crisis. Several students and professors at North South University (NSU) have been arrested for alleged ties to the group. The university was placed under government monitoring following the arrest of seven students for the murder of blogger Ahmed Rajib Haider. In 2015, literature associated with the group was discovered in the NSU library. Furthermore, Pro-Vice Chancellor Gias Uddin Ahsan was arrested on charges of providing shelter to individuals involved in the July 2016 Dhaka attack.

Shafiur Rahman Farabi, reportedly a leader associated with HTB, was charged in connection with the 2015 murder of secular blogger Ananta Bijoy Das. While acquitted in that case due to a lack of evidence in March 2017, he was convicted and sentenced to life imprisonment for the murder of blogger Avijit Roy. Farabi was released on bail on July 30, 2025.

Following the fall of the Sheikh Hasina government in 2024, reports indicated that the group has resumed public activities.

== March for Khilafat program ==
2025 Baitul Mukarram South clashes
- Date: 7th March, 2025
- Location: Baitul Mukarram
- Methods: Demonstration; Rally; Assembly
- Result: Protests suppressed

Parties
Government of Bangladesh: Bangladesh Army; Bangladesh Police; Rapid Action Battalion	Hizb ut-Tahrir: Hizb ut-Tahrir Wilayah Bangladesh

Casualties and losses
None	Over 10 injured, 36 arrested

In March 2025, the Counter Terrorism and Transnational Crime (CTTC) unit of Dhaka arrested three members of Hizb ut-Tahrir in Uttara, Dhaka, who were secretly planning a rally called the "March for Khilafat" near the Baitul Mukarram Mosque. Despite many arrests, the organization proceeded with the rally after Jummah prayer at the mosque's south gate. As the protesters moved toward Paltan and Bijoynagar, police set up a blockade. Clashes erupted when law enforcement intervened, prompting protesters to hurl bricks and stones. In response, police used sound grenades and tear gas to disperse the crowd. The situation escalated, resulting in the arrest of several more members of Hizb ut-Tahrir.

=== Rallies and gatherings ===
Hizb ut-Tahrir supporters started gathering in Baitul Mukarram South after Friday Jummah prayer. The government had already deployed security forces in that zone. Protests came out in the whole town at one point. Hizb ut-Tahrir supporters were chanting "Muktir ek poth Khilafot! Khilafot!" (Translation: One way to Liberation, Caliphate! Caliphate!!).

=== Violent clashes ===
Clashes broke out between government forces and protesters after police started throwing sound grenades and tear gas shells at the protesters. It resulted in 10 injured (including 2 journalists) and 36 Hizb ut-Tahrir members including the key figures in the organization getting arrested.
