= Abdullah Nuri =

Abdullah Nuri may refer to:

- Abdollah Nouri, Iranian politician
- Abdullo Nuri, Tajik politician
