= Shafiur Rahman Farabi =

Bangladeshi Islamist blogger, activist and writer

- শাফিউর রহমান ফারাবী
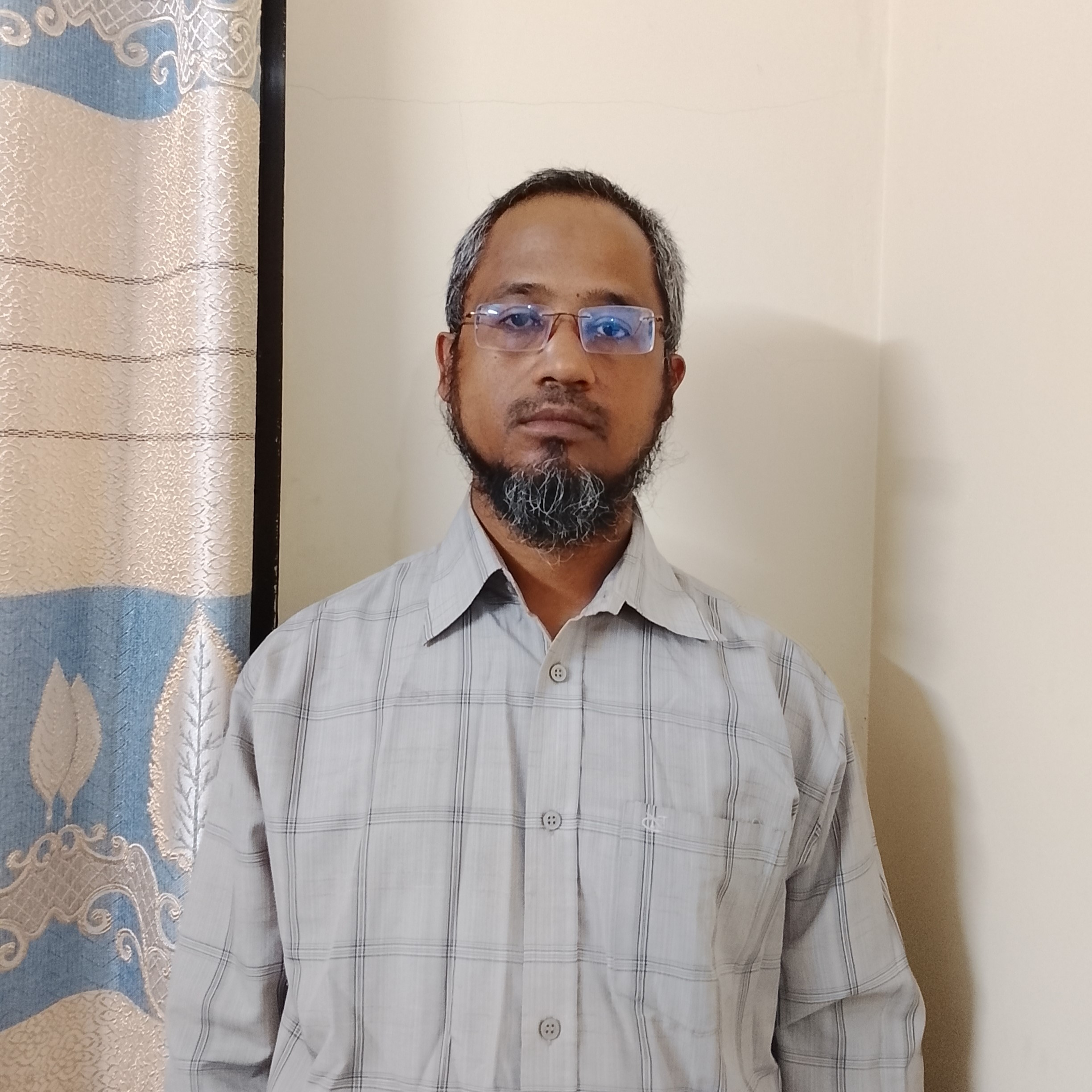
- Farabi in 2025
- Born: May 29, 1986 (age 40); Brahmanbaria District, Bangladesh
- Other name: Farabi Shafiur Rahman
- Occupations: Blogger, writer
- Known for: Islamist activism, controversial writings
- Spouse: Nazmun Nahar Eva
- Parents: Ferdousur Rahman (father); Umme Salma Sheli (mother)
- Website: https://farabiblog.com/

Shafiur Rahman Farabi (Bengali: শাফিউর রহমান ফারাবী; born in 1986) is a Bangladeshi Islamist blogger, activist, and writer. He is an alleged member of Hizb ut-Tahrir Bangladesh. He has used his online presence to write counter-blogs, criticizing and refuting the claims of individuals accused of blasphemy against Islam and criticizing Islam.

== Early life ==
Farabi was born in 1986 in Borovila Kumarshil More, Kalishreepara village, Sadar Upazila, Brahmanbaria District. His father is Ferdousur Rahman and his mother is Umme Salma Sheli. He completed his primary education from Railway Government Primary School in Kishoreganj District in 1996, SSC from Kendua Joyhari Sprite Government High School in 2001, and HSC from Notre Dame College, Dhaka in 2005. His studies were disrupted for two years due to mental health problems. He was admitted to the Physics Department of Chittagong University in the 2005–2006 academic year. At the time of his arrest in 2015, he was a fourth-year student.

== Blogging and activism ==
While studying at Chittagong University, Farabi became involved in student activism. In 2010, along with 24 other students, he was arrested during protests against fee hikes and spent a month in jail before being released on bail. He became known for provocative online posts targeting secular and atheist bloggers. During interrogation, he admitted to authorities that he had gained a significant following by writing about his interpretation of Islamic ideology and actively opposing bloggers whose views he considered atheist and anti-Islam. His online targets included Thaba Baba (blogger Ahmed Rajib Haider), Asif Mohiuddin, Avijit Roy, Taslima Nasrin and others.

He described then former Prime Minister Sheikh Hasina as an atheist in 2012.

== Personal life ==
Farabi married Nazmun Nahar Eva on September 18, 2025.

== Books ==
After being released from imprisonment, Farabi published the following books:

Title	ISBN	Reference
Farabi Rochona Shomogro 1st Part	9789849056683	
Farabi Rochona Shomogro 2nd Part	9789849056690	

== Arrests and imprisonment ==
Farabi was arrested for posting celebratory and provocative comments on Facebook after the murder of blogger Ahmed Rajib Haider.

Farabi was arrested on March 2, 2015, as the main suspect in instigating the murder of writer-blogger Avijit Roy, which occurred on February 26, 2015. Before his arrest, he had threatened Roy in numerous Facebook posts, one of which stated, "Avijit lives in America. It is not possible to kill him now. But he will be killed if he returns to the country." He publicly posted a picture of Roy with his wife and daughter on Facebook. He also ran a campaign against online bookstore Rokomari.com for selling Roy's books and threatened the company until the books were removed from the website.

On February 16, 2021, a special anti-terrorism tribunal sentenced five militants to death and Farabi to life imprisonment for his role in instigating the murder of Avijit Roy. He was also accused in the murder of another blogger, Ananta Bijoy Das, but was acquitted of those charges in March 2022. On January 30, 2023, he was sentenced to a separate 7-year prison term under the Information and Communication Technology (ICT) Act for making threats.

=== Support and release ===
After the change of government in Bangladesh in August 2024, various Islamist groups and student movements began demanding the release of Farabi and others they considered political prisoners. Protests demanding his release were held in December 2024 and May 2025.

Prominent Islamic scholar Sheikh Ahmadullah argued that imprisoning Farabi for threats was unjust, especially when Avijit Roy, whom he had threatened, allegedly used offensive language against Islamic figures. In April 2025, interim government's law advisor Asif Nazrul stated that after requests from Hefazat-e-Islam Bangladesh leaders, the government was working to ensure justice for individuals like Farabi. On July 31, 2025, the High Court granted him bail in the Avijit Roy murder case. The state appealed against this decision, but on August 10, 2025, the Appellate Division's Chamber Judge issued a "no order" and upheld the bail.

Farabi was released from Kashimpur Central Jail on August 22, 2025, after almost a decade of imprisonment.

== See also ==
- Pinaki Bhattacharya
- Bangladesh Awami League's staged drama of Islamic militancy
- 2013 Shapla Chattar protests
