= Tajikistani Civil War =

Armed conflict in Tajikistan from 1992 to 1997

- Part of the post-Soviet conflicts and spillover of the Afghan Civil War (1992–1996)
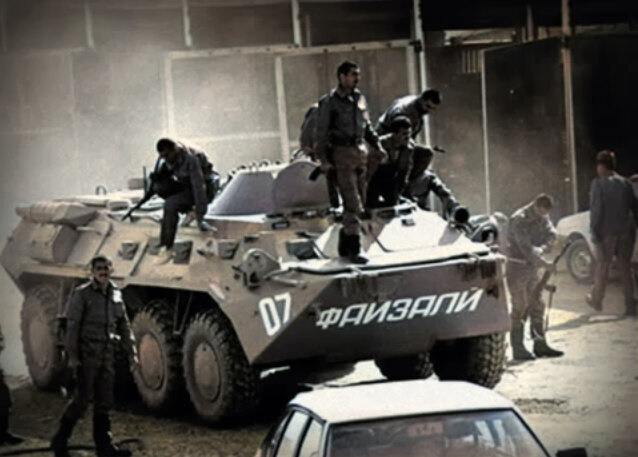
- Spetsnaz soldiers of the 15th Independent Special Forces Brigade during the Civil War
| Date | 5 May 1992 – 27 June 1997 (5 years, 1 month, 3 weeks and 1 day) |
| Location | Tajikistan |
| Result | Armistice |

Belligerents
| Tajikistan; Popular Front of Tajikistan; Communist Party of Tajikistan; Socialist Party of Tajikistan; Russia; Uzbekistan; Kazakhstan; Kyrgyzstan; Supported by: Belarus (weapons supplies); UNMOT: Austria; Bangladesh; Bulgaria; Czech Republic; Denmark; Ghana; Hungary; Indonesia; Jordan; Nepal; Nigeria; Poland; Switzerland; Ukraine; Uruguay | United Tajik Opposition; Islamic Renaissance Party; Democratic Party; Party of People's Unity; Rastokhez; Lali Badakhshan; Supported by: Afghanistan (until 1996); Jamiat-e Islami; Islamic Emirate of Afghanistan (from 1996); Taliban; al-Qaeda; (al-Qaeda) Islamic Movement of Uzbekistan; Iran |

Commanders and leaders
| (Tajikistan) Rahmon Nabiyev (Tajikistan) Akbarsho Iskandrov (Tajikistan) Emomali Rahmon (Uzbekistan) Islam Karimov (Russia) Boris Yeltsin (Kazakhstan) Nursultan Nazarbayev (Kyrgyzstan) Askar Akayev (United Nations) (Jordan) Hassan Abaza | Sayid Abdulloh Nuri (UTO); Mohammed Sharif Himmatzade (IRP); Shadman Youssof (Democratic Party) |

Strength
| Tajikistan: 42,000–45,000; Russia: 5,000–15,000 border troops Uzbekistan: 20,600; Kazakhstan: 10,300; Kyrgyzstan: 278; Total strength: 78,178–91,178 | Estimated: around 50,000–70,000 |

Casualties and losses
| Russia: 302 killed, 1,583 wounded | Unknown |
- 50,000–100,000 killed 1.2 million displaced

The Tajikistani Civil War (Note: Tajik: Ҷанги шаҳрвандии Тоҷикистон, romanized: Jangi shahrvandiyi Tojikiston, IPA: [ˈdʒaŋɡɪ ʃɐɦɾʋɐnˈdijɪ tʰɔdʒikʰɪsˈtʰɔn]; Russian: Гражданская война в Таджикистане, romanized: Graždanskaja vojna v Tadžikistane, IPA: [ɡrɐʐˈdanskəjə vɐjˈna f‿tədʐ(ː)ɨkʲɪˈstanʲe]; Also known as Tajik Civil War) was an armed conflict in Tajikistan that began in May 1992 and ended in June 1997. Regional groups from the Garm and Gorno-Badakhshan regions of Tajikistan rose up against the newly formed government of President Rahmon Nabiyev, which was dominated by people from the Khujand and Kulob regions. The rebel groups were led by a combination of liberal democratic reformers and Islamists, who would later organize under the banner of the United Tajik Opposition. The government was supported by Russian military and border guards.

The main zone of conflict was in the country's south, although disturbances occurred nationwide. The civil war was at its peak during its first year and continued for five years, devastating the country. An estimated 20,000 to 150,000 people were killed in the conflict, and about 10 to 20 percent of the population of Tajikistan were internally displaced. On 27 June 1997, Tajikistan president Emomali Rahmon, United Tajik Opposition (UTO) leader Sayid Abdulloh Nuri and Special Representative of the United Nations Secretary-General Gerd Merrem signed the General Agreement on the Establishment of Peace and National Accord in Tajikistan and the Moscow Protocol in Moscow, Russia, ending the war.

== History ==
=== Background ===
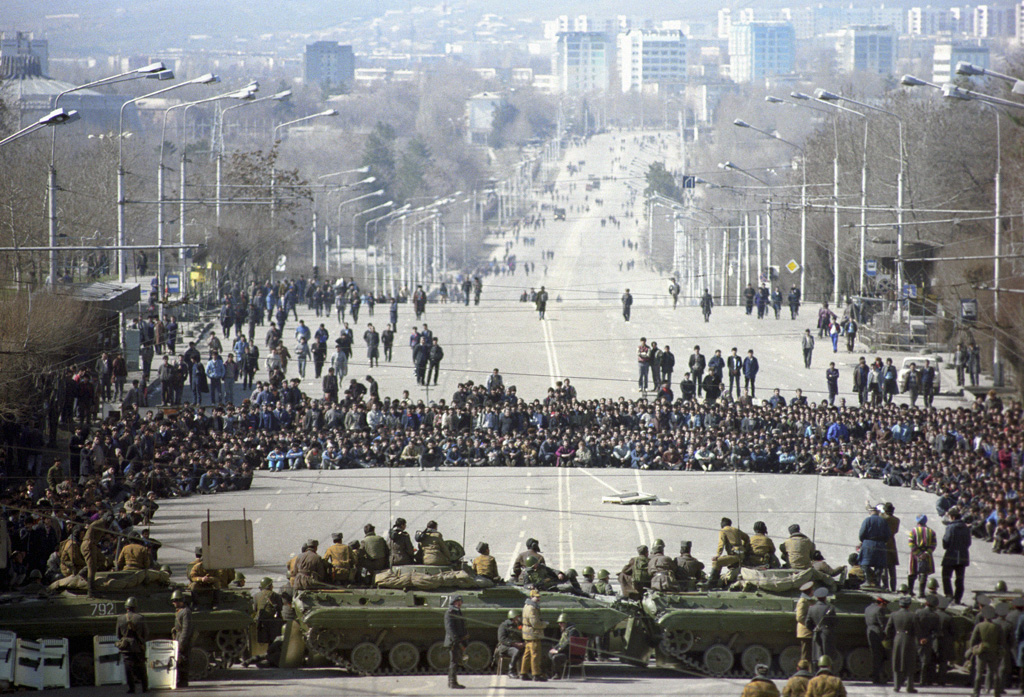
1990 Dushanbe riots

There were numerous causes of the civil war in Tajikistan, such as economic hardship, communal way of life of Tajiki people and their high religiosity. Under Soviet president Mikhail Gorbachev's perestroika policies, an Islamic-democratic movement began to emerge in the Tajik SSR. The backbone of opposition were the Party of Tajikistan Muslim Resurrection, the Democratic Party of Tajikistan, and some other movements. The fight between the former communist elite and opposition shifted from the political sphere to an ethnic and clan-based one.

Tensions rose in the spring of 1992 after opposition members took to the streets in demonstrations against the results of the 1991 presidential election. President Rahmon Nabiyev and the speaker of the Supreme Soviet, Safarali Kenjayev, orchestrated the distribution of weapons to pro-government militias, while the opposition turned to the mujahideen in Afghanistan for military aid.

=== Conflict (1992–1993) ===
Fighting broke out on 5 May 1992 between old-guard supporters of the government and a loosely organized opposition composed of ethnic and regional groups from the Gharm and Gorno-Badakhshan areas (the latter were also known as Pamiris). Ideologically, the opposition included democratic liberal reformists and Islamists. The government, on the other hand, was dominated by people from the Leninabadi region, which had also made up most of the ruling elite during the entire Soviet period. It was also supported by people from the Kulob and Regar (Tursunzoda) region, who had held high posts in the Ministry of Internal Affairs in Soviet times. After many clashes, the Leninabadis were forced to accept a compromise and a new coalition government was formed, incorporating members of the opposition and eventually dominated by them. On 7 September 1992, Nabiyev was captured by opposition protesters and forced at gunpoint to resign his presidency. Chaos and fighting between the opposing factions reigned outside of the capital Dushanbe.

With the aid of the Russian military and Uzbekistan, the Regari-Kulobi Popular Front forces routed the opposition in early and late 1992. The coalition government in the capital was forced to resign. On 12 December 1992 the Supreme Soviet (parliament), where the coalition faction between Khujand and Kulob had held the majority of seats all along, convened and elected a new government under the leadership of Emomali Rahmon, representing a shift in power from the old power based in Leninabad to the militias from Kulob, from which Rahmon came.

The height of hostilities occurred from 1992 to 1993 and pitted Kulobi militias against an array of groups, including militants from the Islamic Renaissance Party of Tajikistan (IRPT) and ethnic minority Pamiris from Gorno-Badakhshan. In large part due to the foreign support they received, the Regari-Kulobi militias were able to soundly defeat opposition forces and went on what has been described by Human Rights Watch as an ethnic cleansing campaign against Pamiris and Garmis. The campaign was concentrated in areas south of the capital and included the murder of prominent individuals, mass killings, the burning of villages and the expulsion of the Pamiri and Garmi population into Afghanistan. The violence was particularly concentrated in Qurghonteppa, the power base of the IRP and home to many Garmis. Tens of thousands were killed or fled to Afghanistan.

Ibodullo Boimatov and his units in coalition with Kulobi forces also played a crucial, decisive role to the victory against the opposition. Starting off with a few hundred men in Regar with support from Uzbekistan against the local oppositional juntas - who were discriminatively targeting Uzbeks of the region, too soon Boimatovs militia grew to few thousand units and aided heavily the Kulobi coalition against the opposition. His men seized the control of capital Dushanbe twice during the course of war from the opposition forces.

=== Continued conflict (1993–1997) ===
In Afghanistan, the opposition reorganized and rearmed with the aid of the Jamiat-i-Islami. The group's leader Ahmad Shah Masoud became a benefactor of the Tajik opposition. Later in the war the opposition organized under an umbrella group called the United Tajik Opposition, or UTO. Elements of the UTO, especially in the Tavildara region, became the Islamic Movement of Uzbekistan, while the leadership of the UTO was opposed to the formation of the organization.

Other combatants and armed bands that flourished in this civil chaos simply reflected the breakdown of central authority rather than loyalty to a political faction. In response to the violence the United Nations Mission of Observers in Tajikistan was deployed. Most fighting in the early part of the war occurred in the southern part of the country, but by 1996 the rebels were battling Russian troops in the capital city of Dushanbe.

=== Armistice and aftermath ===
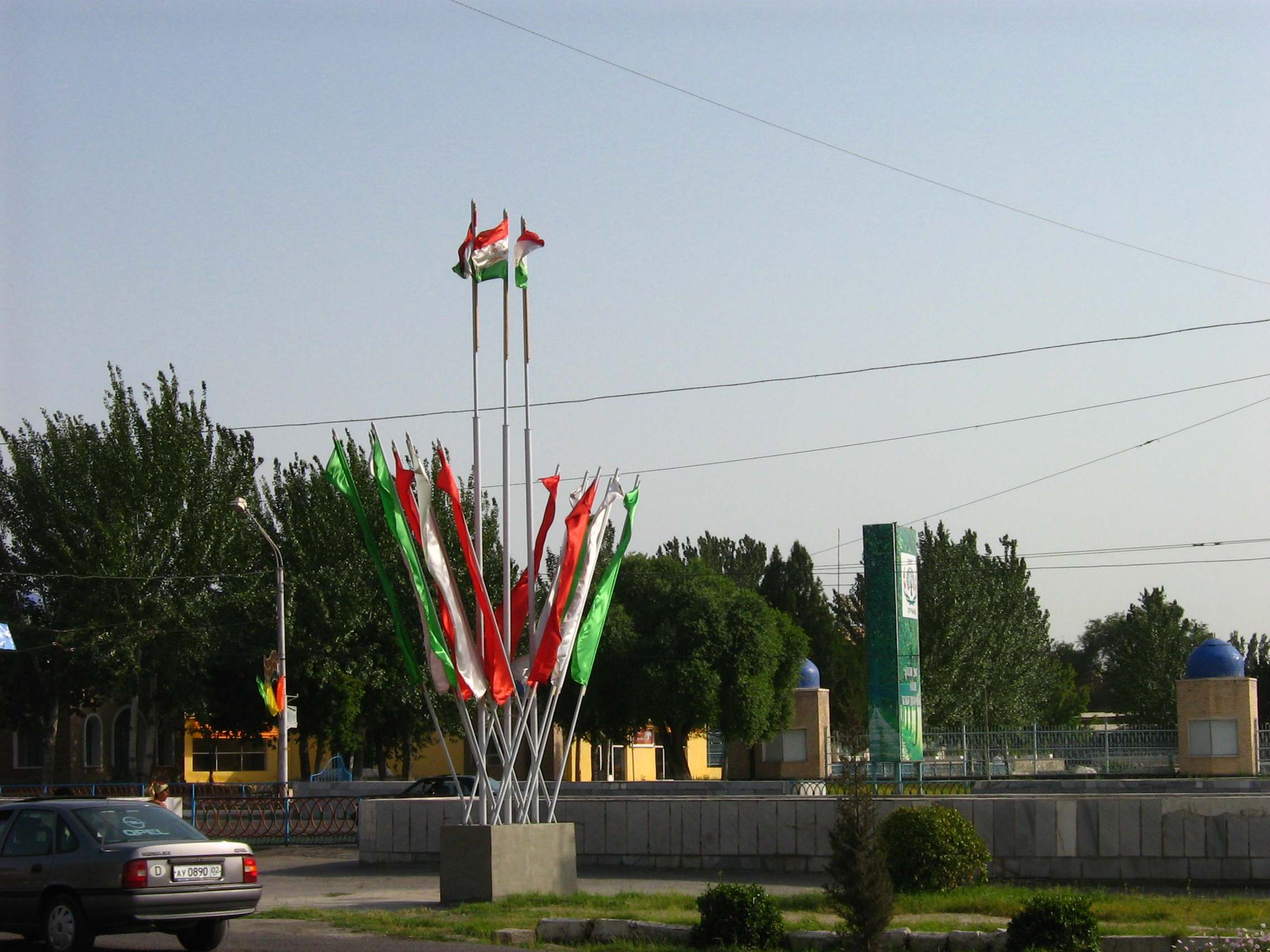
Holiday flags in Khujand in 2007 in honour of 'Day of National Unity', declared a work-free holiday in 1998.

A United Nations-sponsored armistice finally ended the war in 1997. This was in part fostered by the Inter-Tajik Dialogue, a Track II diplomacy initiative in which the main players were brought together by international actors, namely the United States and Russia. The peace agreement eliminated the Leninabad region (Khujand) from power. Presidential elections were held on 6 November 1999.

The UTO warned in letters to United Nations Secretary General Kofi Annan and Tajik President Emomali Rahmon on 23 June 1997 that it would not sign the proposed peace agreement on 27 June if prisoner exchanges and the allocation of jobs in the coalition government were not outlined in the agreement. Akbar Turajonzoda, second-in-command of the UTO, repeated this warning on 26 June, but said both sides were negotiating. President Rahmon, UTO leader Sayid Abdulloh Nuri and Russian president Boris Yeltsin met in the Kremlin in Moscow on 26 June to finish negotiating the peace agreement. The Tajik government had previously pushed for settling these issues after the two sides signed the agreement, with the posts in the coalition government decided by a joint commission for national reconciliation and prisoner exchanges by a future set of negotiations. Russian foreign minister Yevgeny Primakov met with the foreign ministers of Iran, Kazakhstan and Turkmenistan to discuss the proposed peace accord.

By the end of the war, Tajikistan was in a state of complete devastation. Around 1.2 million people were refugees inside and outside the country. Tajikistan's physical infrastructure, government services and economy were in disarray and much of the population was surviving on subsistence handouts from international aid organizations. The United Nations established a Mission of Observers in December 1994, maintaining peace negotiations until the warring sides signed a comprehensive peace agreement in 1997.

== Targeting of journalists ==
Journalists were particularly targeted for assassination and at least 40 Tajik journalists were killed. Many more fled the country, leading to a brain drain. Notable individuals murdered include journalist and politician Otakhon Latifi, journalist and Jewish leader Meirkhaim Gavrielov, politician Safarali Kenjayev and four members of the United Nations Mission of Observers in Tajikistan: Yutaka Akino, a noted Japanese scholar of Central Asian history; Maj. Ryszard Szewczyk from Poland; Maj. Adolfo Scharpegge from Uruguay; and Jourajon Mahramov from Tajikistan; and documentary filmmaker Arcady Ruderman, from Belarus.

== Gallery ==
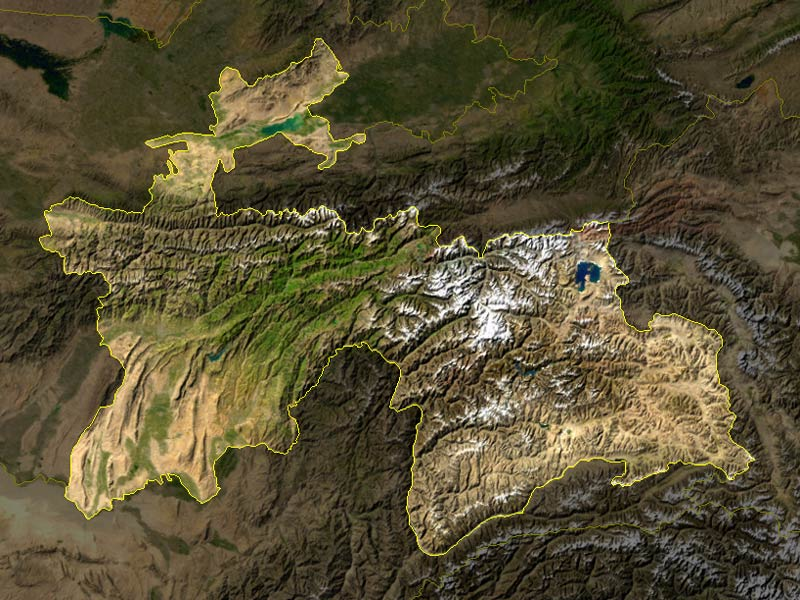
Satellite photograph of Tajikistan

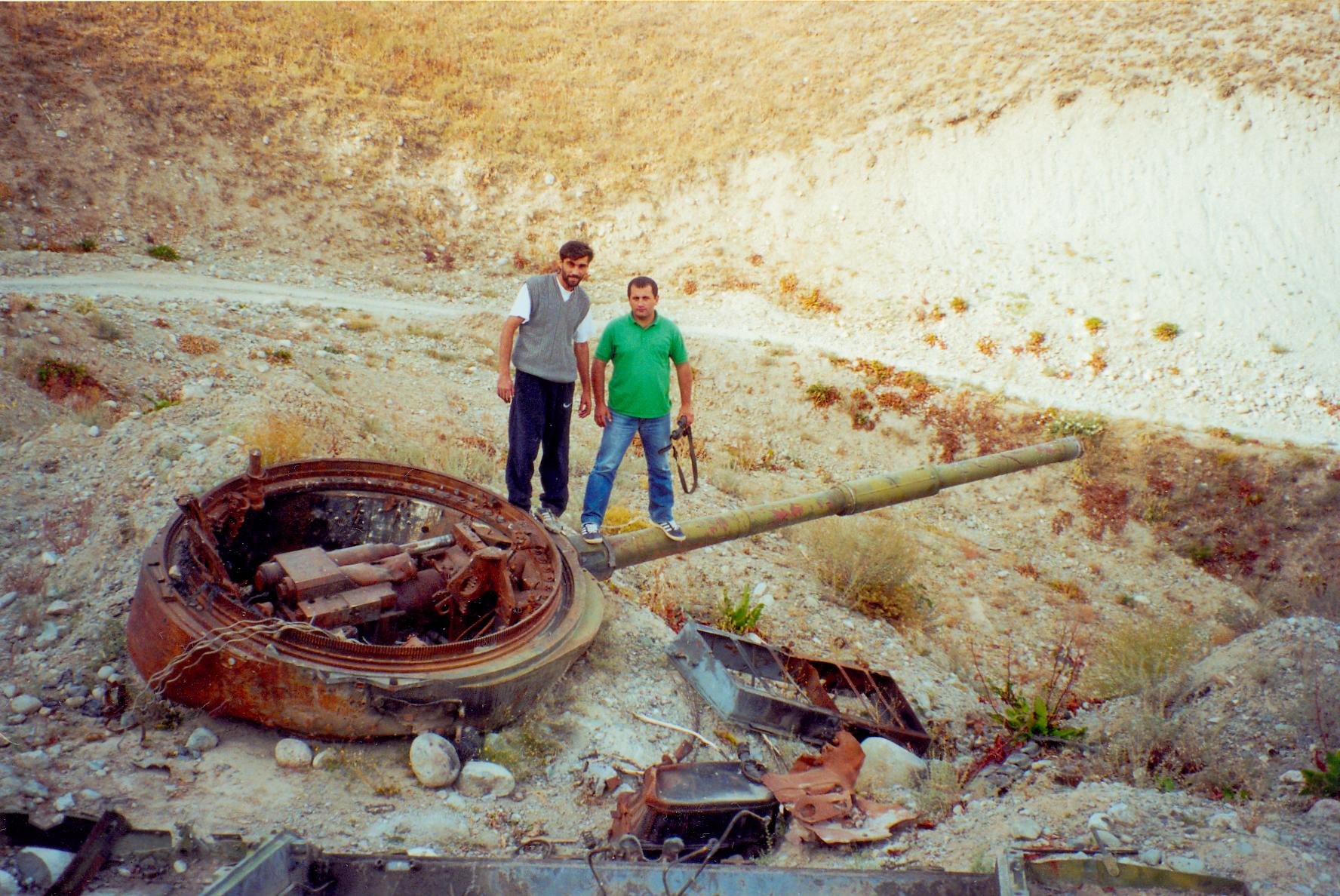
Destroyed turret of a T-72

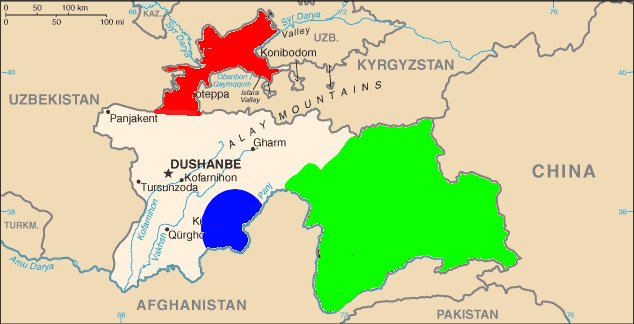
Tajikistan factions in civil war: Leading clans: Northern Sughd Region (red), Southern Khatlon Region (blue), Pamir (Gorno-Badakhshan) (green)

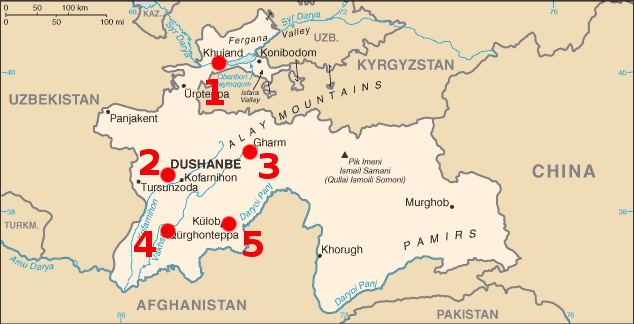
The most important cities involved in the conflict. 1) Khujand 2) Dushanbe 3) Gharm 4) Qurghonteppa 5) Kulob

== See also ==
- Tajikistan-Uzbekistan relations
- United Nations Mission of Observers in Tajikistan
- 1992 Tajikistan protests
- Post-Soviet conflicts
- List of civil wars
