= Alhaj Mutalib Baig =

Afghan politician

Member of the House of the People
- In office Unknown–2011
- Constituency: Takhar Province

Police Chief of Takhar
- In office 2004–Unknown

Police Chief of Kunduz
- In office 2006–Unknown

Personal details
- Died: December 25, 2011 Taloqan, Takhar Province, Afghanistan
- Party: Jamiat-e-Islami
- Profession: Politician, Military Commander
- Known for: Political leadership, opposition to Taliban, death in 2011 suicide bombing

Military service
- Allegiance: Northern Alliance
- Rank: Commander
Alhaj Mutalib Baig
- Allegiance: Northern Alliance
- Conflicts: Afghan Civil War

Alhaj Mutalib Baig (died 25 December 2011) was an Afghan politician. A former commander of the Northern Alliance, and member of the Jamiat-e-Islami party, he represented Takhar Province in the House of the People. Baig was an ethnic Uzbek, and a former commander of the Jamiat-e-Islami party. The party was part of the Northern Alliance, an Afghan faction that opposed the Taliban. Baig was the former police chief in Takhar in 2004 and Kunduz in 2006.

Baig was one of 19 people killed in a suicide bombing in Taloqan in December 2011. The attack occurred as people gathered in Taloqan for the funeral of a government official, and was reported to have been carried out by a member of the Islamic Movement of Uzbekistan. Abdul Jabar Taqwa, the Governor of Takhar, had also been invited to the funeral, but did not attend. He later claimed that the target of the bombing was himself or Baig.

Baig had been accused by the local populace of illegal land grabs in Taloqan, as well as involvement in drug-trafficking in Takhar.
