= Akino Memorial Research Fellowship =

Fellowship of the United Nations University

The UNU Akino Memorial Research Fellowship is awarded for studies in the fields of human security and sustainable development in Central Asia and neighboring regions. It was instituted in 1999 in memory of Dr. Yutaka Akino, who was killed in July 1998 while on active service as a Civil Affairs Officer of the United Nations Mission of Observers in Tajikistan (UNMOT).

The fellowship links the UNU-Akino Memorial Research Project on Central Asia and neighboring regions where Akino had an academic and professional interest. On an exceptional basis, fellowships can be awarded to nationals of Central Asian countries who study at a Japanese university.

In 1999 the UNU received a ¥100 million donation from the Japanese government in memory of Akino. Half of the donation is being used to fund the five-year Akino Memorial Research Project.

== See also ==
- List of environmental awards
