= Lali Badakhshan =

Lal'i Badakhshan Лаъли Бадахшон Лали Бадахшан
- Leader: Atobek Amirbekov
- Founded: 4 March 1991
- Dissolved: 1999
- Ideology: Pamiri minority politics Badakhshani nationalism Regionalism; Traditionalism
- Political position: Syncretic
- Religion: Islam (Naqshbandi, Nizari Isma'ilism)

Party flag

Lali Badakhshan (/ˈlæli bəˈdɑːkʃɑːn/; Russian: Лали Бадахшан [ˈɫalʲɪ bədɐxˈʂan]; Tajik: Лаъли Бадахшон [ˈlaʔlɪ bədɐχˈʃɔn]), translated as Rubies of Badakhshan and named after the writings of Sufi pirs, was an opposition political party in Tajikistan. The party was formed by Pamiri people for the purpose of protecting the rights of Pamiris and promoting the autonomy of the Gorno-Badakhshan Autonomous Province.

== History ==
The party formed on 4 March 1991 during the last months before the demise of the Soviet Union and Atobek Amirbekov was appointed as the party head.

In the November 1991 Tajik presidential election that took place after Tajikistan gained independence the party supported the candidacy of opposition candidate Davlat Khudonazarov. During the Civil War in Tajikistan members of Lali Badakhshan supported the opposition and in 1993 Lali Badakhshan officially joined the United Tajik Opposition (UTO).

Between 1994 and 1997 the party participated in Inter-Tajik Peace Talks. In 1999 the party left the UTO.
