= Abu Dhar Azzam =

Rohingya Islamist

- أبو ذر عزام
- Title: Cleric
- Other name: Abu Dhar al-Burmi

Religious life
- Religion: Islam

Abu Dhar Azzam (Arabic: أبو ذر عزام), also known as Abu Dhar al-Burmi (Arabic: أبو ذر البورمي) and Abu Dhar al Bakistani (أبو ذر الباكستاني), is a Rohingya Islamist cleric and a member of the Islamic Movement of Uzbekistan (IMU).

== Biography ==
Abu Dhar worked in Jamiah Farooqia, Karachi in 2004, before he joined the insurgency movement in Pakistan's tribal areas (FATA). He has been a prominent member of the Turkistan Islamic Party, the Pakistani Taliban and the Islamic Movement of Uzbekistan.

He was a former spokesperson for the IMU and a former member of the Islamic State of Iraq and the Levant (ISIL).

Azzam is sympathetic to the Rohingyas and supported them during the 2012 Rakhine State riots. He also congratulated the Tsarnaev brothers for carrying out the Boston Marathon bombing.

== See also ==
- Rohingya conflict
