= 1999 Tashkent bombings =

Six terrorist car bombings in Uzbekistan

- Location: Tashkent, Uzbekistan
- Date: 16 February 1999; 10:50 (GMT+5)
- Attack type: Car bombing
- Weapon: Car bombs
- Deaths: 16
- Injuries: >120

The 1999 Tashkent bombings occurred on 16 February when six car bombs exploded in Tashkent, the capital of Uzbekistan. The bombs exploded over the course of an hour and a half, and targeted multiple government buildings. It is possible that five of the explosions were a distraction from the sixth, which appeared to be an attempt to assassinate President Islam Karimov. 16 were killed, and over 120 injured.

Although the government blamed Islamic rebels – the Islamic Movement of Uzbekistan (IMU) – critics have cast doubt on this assessment.

Because of the tight media control in the country, the sequence of events of the attacks is not totally clear.

== The attacks ==
According to the official version of the attacks, four to five men drove a car full of explosives up to the main entrance to the Cabinet of Ministers building a few minutes before Karimov was due to speak there. The attackers left the scene. A separate car explosion and gunfight occurred a few hundred meters away, distracting the guards. The attackers fled the scene.

== Investigation ==
According to the Russian Federal Security Service, the bombings utilized a mechanical mixture of aluminium powder and ammonium nitrate as the explosive. The terrorists have received instruction in training centers run by Khattab and Basayev in Chechnya.

== Government response ==
Two hours after the explosion, President Karimov and the heads of the Uzbek security forces declared that Islamic militants were responsible. Many individuals were arrested, with estimates ranging from the hundreds to up to 5,000. Human rights groups have criticized the detentions as illegitimate. They have also accused the government of planting evidence and getting confessions through torture.

In January 2000, on the eve of the Muslim holiday of Ramadan, the government announced the execution of several of the alleged participants in the attacks.

The Uzbek government also accused Tajikistan of being complicit in the attacks, and temporarily closed its border with the country in response.

== Possible perpetrators ==
Although the government has blamed the Islamic Movement of Uzbekistan (IMU), an Islamist terrorist organization, for the attacks, critics have doubted this. Some have cast blame on Russia, although others have called this unlikely. Another possibility is that forces in the majority-Muslim Tajikistan government were retaliating for Uzbek support for Tajik opposition groups. Tajik terrorist groups have been suggested as well, especially the United Tajik Opposition (UTO).

Others have even suggested that the government itself was responsible, or that competing "clans", whose share of power in the government had recently been cut, were behind the attacks. In particular it has been suggested that the National Security Service, allegedly controlled by the Tashkent clan, was involved.

== Aftermath ==
Critics have said that the Karimov regime used the attacks as an excuse to crack down on religious and, to a lesser extent, secular dissent. The attacks also showed how vulnerable the country was to terrorism and instability. Jaslyk Prison was opened in 1999 to hold thousands arrested following the bombings.

== Bibliography ==
- Polat, Abdumannob; Nickolai Butkevich (March 1999), Unraveling the Mystery of the Tashkent Bombings : Theories and Implications (PDF), Turkistan ENewsletter, archived from the original (PDF) on 4 May 2018
- Jonson, Lena (2004). Vladimir Putin and Central Asia: the shaping of Russian foreign policy. I.B.Tauris. ISBN 978-1-85043-628-7.
