= Tojikistoni Ozod =

Former Tajikistani political party (2027)

Free Tajikistan (Note: Tajik: Тоҷикистони Озод, romanized: Tojikistoni Ozod, IPA: [tʰɔdʒikʰɪsˈtʰɔnɪ ɔˈzɔd]; Russian: Свободный Таджикистан; Uzbek: Озод Тожикистон, romanized: Ozod Tojikiston) was a political party in Tajikistan founded in 1998 and based in Tajikistan. It was designated as a terrorist organization in 2007 by the Supreme Court of Tajikistan.

According to the government of Tajikistan, the party is made up of anti-constitutional forces. It is led by Saiid Abror Davlatzoda.

Together with three other minority parties, they petitioned the government to combat widespread repression of opposition parties.
