= Yutaka Akino =

Japanese political scientist (1950–1998)

- 秋野豊
- Born: 1 July 1950; Otaru, Hokkaido, Japan
- Died: 20 July 1998 (aged 48); Darband, Tajikistan
- Cause of death: Gunshot wounds
- Education: Waseda University (BA); Hokkaido University (BA) (JD)
- Occupations: Political scientist; Researcher; University professor
- Years active: 1981–1998

Yutaka Akino (秋野豊, Akino Yutaka; 1 July 1950 – 20 July 1998) was a Japanese political scientist, researcher and University professor who specialized in Russian diplomacy and Central Asian geopolitics. Akino, alongside 3 others were killed by unknown assailants in Darband, a district east of Dushanbe, Tajikistan in 1998 while serving as a United Nations peacekeeper for the United Nations Mission of Observers in Tajikistan (UNMOT).

== Biography ==
Akino was born in Otaru, Hokkaido. After graduating from Hokkaido Otaru Shioryo High School, he entered Waseda University and Hokkaido University. He graduated from both Universities in 1974 and 1976 respectively with a Bachelor of Arts degree. He then entered Postgraduate education in Hokkaido University's School of Law, obtaining a Master's degree in 1978 and a Doctorate degree in 1983, studying British-Soviet relations during the Second World War.

After working as an assistant at Hokkaido University and a researcher at the Japanese Embassy in Moscow, Akino began teaching as a lecturer for the University of Tsukuba in 1986, where he was promoted to associate professor in 1988.

In 1998, Akino resigned from the University of Tsukuba and began working for Japan's Ministry of Foreign Affairs. Akino was sent to Tajikistan in April of the same year to work as a civil affairs officer under the assistance of the United Nations Mission of Observers in Tajikistan (UNMOT) peace-keeping mission.

== Death ==
On 20 July 1998, Akino was patrolling a mountainous area east of Dushanbe named Darband, in what is today Nurobod District, alongside fellow UN peacekeepers Polish Major Ryszard Szewczyk and Uruguayan Major Adolfo Scharpegge, and Tajik interpreter Jourajon Mahramov. The group were ambushed by unknown assailants while in their UN vehicle. Akino, along with the rest of the team, were shot and killed. 5 days later on July 25, Akino's body was brought to his home in Sapporo and a private funeral, in accordance with his family's wishes, was held the following day.

On 24 October 2015, Japanese Prime Minister Shinzo Abe laid a wreath at the site of Akino's death during his visit to Tajikistan.

On 3 July 2018, a symposium was held to commemorate the 20th anniversary of Akino's death with Foreign Minister Taro Kono attending in person to pay tribute.

== Legacy ==
Akino is widely regarded as the architect of the development of diplomatic relations between Japan and Tajikistan, as highlighted by Foreign Minister Kono, and several other high-ranking Japanese and Tajik officials during their speeches in the 20th anniversary of Akino's death.

The Yutaka Akino Eurasia Fund was established in accordance to Akino's will. The United Nations Development Program Tajikistan office in Dushanbe erected a memorial monument for the victims of the attack, including Akino.

The Akino Memorial Research Fellowship was instituted in 1999 by the United Nations University for studies in the fields of human security and sustainable development in Central Asia and neighboring regions.

== Publications ==
=== Individual Author ===
- 『世界は大転回する』（Kodansha, 1990）
- 『欧州新地図を読む』（Jiji Press, 1990）
- 『ミハイル・ゴルバチョフ|ゴルバチョフの2500日』（Kodansha Gendai Shinsho, 1992）
- 『偽りの同盟――チャーチルとスターリンの間』（Keiso Shobo, 1998）、on demand version published in 2005
- 『ユーラシアの世紀――民族の争乱と新たな国際システムの出現』（Nikkei, Inc., 2000）

=== Translations ===
- ヴォイチェフ・マストニー著『冷戦とは何だったのか――戦後政治史とスターリン』（Kashiwashobo Publishing Co., Ltd, 2000）ISBN 978-4760118908
