= Muhammad Sharif Himmatzoda =

Tajikistan politician (1950s – 2010)

Muhammadsharif Himmatzoda
- Муҳаммадшариф Ҳимматзода

Member of the Assembly of Representatives of Tajikistan
- In office 2000–2009

Personal details
- Born: 6 July 1951 Tavildara, Tajik SSR
- Died: 17 March 2010 (aged 58) Dushanbe, Tajikistan
- Party: Islamic Renaissance Party of Tajikistan
- Education: University of Peshawar
- Profession: Politician, Theologian

Muhammad Sharif Himmatzoda (6 July 1951 – 17 March 2010) was a Tajikistani politician who served as the spiritual guide of the Islamic Renaissance Party of Tajikistan (IRPT).

== Background ==
Himmatzoda was chosen as the inaugural leader of the party in 1991, following its official recognition. However, the onset of the civil war in 1992 led Himmatzoda to depart from Tajikistan and align himself with the United Tajik Opposition (UTO) while in exile. Subsequently, he was appointed as the deputy leader of the organization.
