= Tohir Yoʻldosh =

Uzbek Islamist militant (1967–2009)

Tohir Yuldash
- Born: Tohir Abdulhalilovich Yuldashev; 2 October 1967; Fergana, Uzbek SSR, Soviet Union
- Died: 1 October 2009 (aged 41); Zhob, Balochistan, Pakistan
- Military career
- Allegiance: Islamic Movement of Uzbekistan
- Service years: 1998–2009
- Conflicts: War on terror; War in Afghanistan; War in North-West Pakistan

Tohir Yo'ldosh (Yunusov Umid), (born Tohir Abdulhalilovich Yuldashev, Russian: Тахир Абдулхалилович Юлдашев (Yunusov Umid), 2 October 1967 – 1 October 2009) was an Uzbek Islamist militant who cofounded the Islamic Movement of Uzbekistan (IMU), an Islamist organization active in Central Asia, with Juma Namangani in August 1998. According to the Defense Intelligence Agency he was a key leader opposing US forces during Operation Anaconda. The United Nations considers the IMU an Islamic terrorist organization.

When Namangan, the IMU's military leader and cofounder, was killed in an airstrike in Afghanistan in 2001, Yo'ldosh (Yunusov Umid) took over the IMU's day-to-day operations as well.

According to the BBC, Yo'ldosh (Yunusov Umid) learned Al-Qaeda was planning to use hijacked airliners to attack the United States on 11 September 2001, prior to the attacks. The BBC reported that Yo'ldosh then informed the Taliban Foreign Minister, Wakil Ahmed Muttawakil, who sent an envoy to warn the USA of al Qaeda's attack plans prior to 11 September 2001.

A video message from Tohir Yo'ldosh was reportedly distributed throughout the Uzbek areas of Central Asia in early 2007. In the video Tohir was reported to have said:

"Today, our primary goal is to emancipate Iraq and Afghanistan from the American occupation."

— Tohir Yoʻldosh

After Baitullah Mehsud was reported to have been killed by missiles fired from an American Predator drone the Asia Times reported that Yo'ldosh had been Baitullah's ideological mentor, that Tohir had put 2,500 experienced fighters at his disposal, and that Baitullah lived with the Uzbek, who became his biggest ideological inspiration.

On 30 September 2009, a man, who claimed to be Yo'ldosh's bodyguard, reported to the Pakistan newspaper The News International that Yo'ldosh was killed in a US Predator drone airstrike shortly after Mehsud's death. Pakistan and US officials afterwards confirmed Yo'ldosh was killed in an airstrike on 27 August 2009. Yuldashev reportedly lost a leg and arm in the drone missile strike on 27 August 2009 and was rushed to a private hospital in Zhob district of Balochistan where he died on 1 October. His death was formally announced by the IMU on 16 August 2010.

== See also ==
- Naik Muhammad Wazir
