= Sayid Abdulloh Nuri =

Tajikistani politician and military commander (1947–2006)

Sayid Abdulloh Nuri (Note: Tajik: Сайид Абдуллоҳи Нурӣ, سید عبدالله نوری) (born Abdullah Nuriddinovich Saidov; (Note: Tajik: Абдулло Нуриддинович Саидов) 15 March 1947 – 9 August 2006) was a Tajikistani politician and military commander who led the Islamic Renaissance Party of Tajikistan from 1993 until his death in 2006. During the Tajik Civil War, he led the United Tajik Opposition. Nuri and President of Tajikistan Emomali Rakhmonov ended the civil war by signing the Tajik National Peace Accord in 1997.

== Biography ==
Nuri was born in Sangvor, Qarateghin Valley, Tajik SSR. In 1974 he founded Nahzat-i Islomi, an Islamic education organization. Soviet police arrested him in 1986 for spreading 'religious propaganda', imprisoning him until 1988.

== Niyazov meeting ==
Nuri met with Turkmen President Saparmurat Niyazov in Tehran, Iran on 24 January 1996. Niyazov told Nuri that a CIS summit in Moscow, Russia agreed to renew the mandate of CIS peacekeepers in Tajikistan.

== Islamic state ==
Nuri advocated making Tajikistan an Islamic state. Unlike other militant organizations, after 1997 Nuri embraced a peaceful, gradual change in Tajik laws, telling Radio Free Europe, "Yes, creating an Islamic state is our dream and our hope. But we understand that it can be achieved only stage by stage and in accordance with the wishes of the people of Tajikistan. We want to build a state that will be within the framework of the constitution."

Nuri criticized the Tajik government's expulsion of the Islamic Movement of Uzbekistan, a militant Uzbek Islamic organization, from Tajikistan. He offered to act as a mediator between the IMU and Central Asian governments.

According to an article in The New York Times, declassified United States government documents show that in July 1996 Nuri contacted Iranian foreign intelligence officials in Taloqan, Afghanistan in an attempt to forge an alliance between the Government of Iran, Nuri's followers, and Al-Qaeda leader Osama bin Laden to attack the United States. While Iranian officials offered to meet with Nuri and bin Laden, bin Laden, in Jalalabad, Afghanistan at the time, refused on the grounds that the security risk was too high.

== Murder allegations ==
On 12 September 2003 the website of Khovar Information Agency news reported that Nuri ordered assassination of Sobirjon Begajanov, chairman of the Jabor Rasul District of the Sughd Region. Officials for Khovar said they never approved the article and police never filed charges against Nuri. Nuri said, "I believe the name of the [Khovar] correspondent is fictitious, and he does not exist. That this material was offered by security services about me, the person who convinced 100,000 heavy military opposition groups to lay down arms. I would never [order Begajanov's murder]." IRP member Shams Sayedov called the report a "provocation connected with the forthcoming elections.

== Funeral ==
Nuri's funeral took place in Dushanbe, Tajikistan, with thousands in attendance. IRP Deputy Chairman Muhiddin Kabiri called Nuri an "irreplaceable personality. He led his own school [of thought] in Tajikistan and in the region, which consisted of creating peace, unity, and forgiveness and forgetting [grievances]. The community of Tajikistan did not have this before -- the country had not experienced this sort of thing before. But it showed that Islam is a peace-loving and forgiving religion, and I hope that this is his legacy in Tajikistan." Dodajon Ataullo, editor-in-chief of Charoghi Ruz newspaper, "His death is very heavy on me, very painful for me. During his illness, I was always with him [in spirit]. I remember his face, his features, his soulful eyes. I recognize him not only as one of the biggest politicians, but [also] as one of the major personalities and most beloved figures in Tajikistan's history in the 20th century. That is how I view him." Mahmadsaid Ubaidulloyev, Chairman of the Tajik Parliament, said, "His personal qualities and political charisma raised his authority among the citizens of Tajikistan and the members of the Islamic Renaissance Party. The president of the republic highly values [Nuri's] role, his activities, and appreciates and calls attention to his deeds. Today we say goodbye to a famous politician, and we respect his role in establishing peace and unity in Tajikistan. We remember his great and historic part and his spiritual deeds."
