= Islamic Movement of Uzbekistan =

Islamist Uzbek militant group in Asia

- Jihadist flags used by the IMU and after allegiance to ISIS
- Founders: Tohir Yoʻldosh †; Juma Namangani †
- Leaders: Tohir Yoʻldosh †; Juma Namangani †; Abu Usman Adil †; Usman Ghazi †; Samatov Mamasoli (noms de guerre: Abu Ali) (POW)
- Founded: 1998
- Dates active: 1 August 1998 – 6 August 2015 13 June 2016 – 2023 (split factions)
- Dissolved: 2023
- Allegiance: Taliban (until 2014); Islamic State (since 2015 by some factions); Al-Qaeda (2016–2023 by some factions)
- Headquarters: Afghanistan (until 2023)
- Active regions: Federally Administered Tribal Areas of Pakistan; Northern Afghanistan; Xinjiang region in China
- Ideology: Islamism; Pan-Islamism; Salafi Jihadism; Anti-Zionism; Historical: Anti-Islam Karimov
- Status: Dissolved by the Taliban
- Size: 300 (after 2015, reportedly 700 plus family members post 2016); ~3,000 (2013); 500–1,000 (2004)
- Wars: Civil war in Afghanistan (1996–2001); War in North-West Pakistan; War in Afghanistan (2001–2021), and the War on Terror

The Islamic Movement of Uzbekistan (IMU; Uzbek: Ўзбекистон исломий ҳаракати, Oʻzbekiston islomiy harakati; Russian: Исламское движение Узбекистана, romanized: Islamskoye dvizheniye Uzbekistana) was a militant Islamist group formed in 1998 by Islamic ideologue Tahir Yuldashev and former Soviet paratrooper Juma Namangani; both ethnic Uzbeks from the Fergana Valley. Its original objective was to overthrow President Islam Karimov of Uzbekistan and create an Islamic state under Sharia; however, in subsequent years, it reinvented itself as an ally of Al-Qaeda. The group also maintained relations with Afghan Taliban in the 1990s. However, later on, relations between the Afghan Taliban and the IMU started declining.

Operating out of bases in Tajikistan and Taliban-controlled areas of northern Afghanistan, the IMU launched a series of raids into southern Kyrgyzstan in the years 1999 and 2000. The IMU suffered heavy casualties in 2001–02 during the American-led invasion of Afghanistan. Namangani was killed, while Yuldeshev and many of the IMU's remaining fighters escaped with remnants of the Taliban to Waziristan, in the Federally Administered Tribal Areas of Pakistan. The IMU then focused on fighting the Pakistani military in the Tribal Areas, and NATO and Afghan forces in northern Afghanistan.

In mid-2015, its leadership publicly pledged allegiance to the Islamic State of Iraq and the Levant (ISIS) and announced that the IMU was part of the group's regional branch. In 2016, it was reported that a new faction of Islamic Movement of Uzbekistan emerged after the group became part of ISIS. The new faction retained the group's name and was independent of ISIS. It has also indicated that it is loyal to al-Qaeda and the Taliban and shared their views against ISIS.

== Background ==
During the Soviet era, Islam in Central Asia was officially suppressed – mosques were closed, and all contact with the wider Muslim world was severed. This isolation ended with the Soviet–Afghan War (1979–1989), when thousands of conscripts from Soviet Central Asia were sent to fight the Afghan mujahedin. Many of these conscripts returned home impressed by the Islamic zeal of their opponents, and newly aware of the religious, cultural and linguistic characteristics they shared with their neighbours in the South; and which distinguished them from their rulers in Moscow.

=== Adolat (1991–1992) ===
One such soldier sent to fight in Afghanistan was the Uzbek paratrooper Juma Namangani (born 1969). Following the war, Khojayev returned to his hometown of Namangan in Uzbekistan's Fergana Valley radicalized by his experiences, and became associated with a local Islamic ideologue, Tohir Yuldashev (born 1967). In the period of initial instability that followed Uzbekistan's sudden independence in 1991, Yuldeshev and Khojayev (now adopting the nom de guerre Juma Namangani) established a radical Salafi Islamist group in Namangan which they called Adolat (Justice).

Adolat assumed civil authority in Namangan and quickly established a degree of order and security through the imposition of Sharia Law, which was ruthlessly enforced by Adolat's vigilante cadres. Initially tolerated by the newly installed President Karimov, Adolat became increasingly assertive, culminating in a demand that Karimov impose Sharia throughout Uzbekistan. However, by 1992 Karimov had successfully cemented his authority in Tashkent, and was strong enough to outlaw Adolat and re-establish central control over the Fergana Valley region – traditionally one of the most Islamic regions in Central Asia.

=== Tajik civil war (1992–1997) ===
Evading arrest, Yuldashev and Namagani fled to Tajikistan, where civil war was raging following a bloody but successful coup led by Emomali Rahmonov earlier in 1992. The civil war pitted Rahmonov's neo-communist forces against a loose coalition of democrats and Islamists known as the United Tajik Opposition (UTO). The UTO was led by the widely popular and highly respected Islamist Said Abdullah Nuri, whose Islamic Renaissance Party of Tajikistan (IRPT) advocated a moderate and democratic brand of Islamism.

Namangani's combat experience in Afghanistan saw him entrusted by the IRPT with the command of active units in the field, based out of the remote, mountainous Tavildara Valley region. He enjoyed considerable success in this role. Meanwhile, Yuldashev left Tajikistan on a tour of Afghanistan, Turkey and the Middle East, during which time he developed contacts with numerous Islamist groups. From 1995 to 1998, Yuldashev was based in Peshawar in Pakistan, where he established relations with Osama bin Laden and the Afghan Arabs based there at the time.

=== IMU formation (1998) ===
In 1997 Rahmonov and Nuri signed a peace agreement which saw Rahmonov agree to sharing power with the IRPT. Disillusioned with the political concessions made by the Tajik Islamists, Yuldeshev and Namangani formed the IMU in 1998 with the aim of creating a militant Islamic opposition to Karimov in Uzbekistan. The IMU began moving towards the Afghan Taliban and away from their former and more moderate IRPT allies, who were in turn partially backing the ethnic-Tajik Ahmad Shah Massoud and his Northern Alliance against the Taliban.

Nevertheless, Namangani maintained his base in Tajikistan's Tavildara Valley, and was able to recruit large numbers of disaffected youth from the Fergana Valley, where economic hardship and religious persecution were continuing under Karimov's authoritarian rule.

== History ==
=== Initial operations in Central Asia ===
In 1999 a series of explosions in the capital Tashkent were orchestrated in an unsuccessful attempt on Karimov's life. Karimov placed the blame on the Islamists and the IMU in particular; however this attribution remains disputed, and it is possible the assassination attempt was the work of rival political and regional elites. Irrespective of who was responsible, the result was an escalation in Karimov's suppression of Islam, particularly in the traditionally observant Fergana Valley – a move which only increased the number of those fleeing Uzbekistan to join up with Namangani and the IMU in the Tavildara Valley.

Later that year, the IMU conducted its first verifiable operations, with an incursion into the Batken region of southern Kyrgyzstan, a region populated mainly by ethnic Uzbeks that is between Tavildara in Tajikistan and the Fergana Valley in Uzbekistan. Insurgents seized the Mayor of Osh (the regional capital) and successfully extorted a ransom from the ill-prepared Kyrgyz government in Bishkek, as well as a helicopter to transport them to Afghanistan. Further incursions into Batken followed, with one raid resulted in a number of Japanese geologists kidnapped. Although denied by Japan, their subsequent release was reported to have followed the payment of a significant ransom.

These raids had a major impact in Central Asia, and resulted in considerable international pressure on Tajikistan, not least from Karimov, to expel the IMU from its base in the Tavildara Valley. The IRPT persuaded their former ally Namangani to abandon Tavildara in late 1999. Controversially, Namangani and his fighters were then flown from Tajikistan to northern Afghanistan in Russian military helicopters, a move which enraged Karimov who claimed the Russians were aiding the IMU in an attempt to undermine Uzbekistan.

=== Expansion into Taliban-ruled Afghanistan ===
In Afghanistan Yuldeshev was able to exploit the contacts he had made on his earlier travels to negotiate freedom of operation from the Taliban, in return for providing them with assistance in their battle with Massoud's Northern Alliance.

The IMU established offices and training camps, and began expanding their recruitment of disaffected Uzbeks. It is estimated in 2000 that the IMU was approximately 2000 strong, and in the spring they contributed around 600 fighters to the Taliban's offensive against Massoud, participating in the successful siege of Taloqan, where they fought alongside Bin Laden's 055 Brigade. The IMU also provided the Taliban with a useful degree of deniability, under pressure from China to expel Uighur militants the Taliban simply sent them north to the IMU's camps.

By the summer of 2000, Western and CIS intelligence sources claim the IMU were equipped with more advanced weaponry such as sniper rifles and night-vision goggles, and had been supplied with a pair of heavy transport helicopters by Bin Laden. Namangani led IMU fighters back to the Tavildara Valley in Tajikistan, and from there launched multipronged attacks into Batken in Kyrgyzstan, and also into northern Uzbekistan, close to Tashkent.

In August 2000, the IMU also kidnapped four U.S. mountain-climbers (Tommy Caldwell, Beth Rodden, Jason "Singer" Smith, and John Dickey) in the Kara-Su Valley of Kyrgyzstan, holding them hostage until they escaped on 12 August. In response, the United States classified the IMU as a Foreign Terrorist Organization.

Once again the raids were followed by a strategic retreat to Tavildara, and once again international pressure on the Tajik government saw Namangani agree to him and his men being flown by the Russians back to Afghanistan, where they arrived in January 2001.

By 2001, the connections between the IMU and the Taliban had become more overt, with media reports of Namangani had been appointed Deputy Defence Minister in the Taliban government, which the Taliban did not deny. In the spring the IMU again supplied the Taliban with 600 fighters for a renewed campaign against Massoud, while in Batken in Kyrgyzstan a number of sleepers armed the previous year executed a series of attacks. Uzbek government maintained contacts with Afghan Talibans during the final months of Taliban rule over Afghanistan. The contacts were aimed at convincing Talibans to hand over militants belonging to Islamic Movement of Uzbekistan.

=== Overthrow of Taliban rule ===
Following the attacks of September 11, 2001 and the American-led invasion of Afghanistan, the IMU was largely destroyed while fighting alongside the Taliban, with Namangani being killed in November 2001 by a U.S. airstrike in northern Afghanistan. In March 2002, Yuldashev and many IMU members are believed to have fought against Coalition forces during Operation Anaconda in Afghanistan's Shahi Kot Valley, suffering heavy casualties before retreating to the Tribal Areas of Pakistan.

Members of the IMU began settling down in the region, with some starting families and becoming involved in local business. The group developed close ties with members of the Taliban and al-Qaeda who had also taken refuge in the region, often serving as bodyguards for senior commanders. Tensions grew with some locals however, with the Uzbeks accused by local Taliban leader Maulvi Nazir of disrespecting local customs, killing tribesmen, and involving themselves in local feuds. In early 2007, fighting broke out between Nazir's fighters and the Uzbeks, which resulted in hundreds of casualties on both sides and the expulsion of the IMU from much of South Waziristan.

Many of the retreating IMU members were sheltered by the local militant commander Baitullah Mehsud, and when Mehsud turned against the Pakistani state and formed the Tehrik-i-Taliban Pakistan (TTP) in 2007, the IMU cooperated closely with him. The alliance between the two groups continued after Hakimullah Mehsud succeeded Baitullah as TTP leader in 2009, the IMU and the Tehrik-i-Taliban Pakistan carried out joint attacks on the Pakistani State and eventually formed a combined unit called Ansar al-Aseer, with the goal of freeing militant Islamist prisoners held in Pakistani prisons. Close ties were also formed with the militant Haqqani Network following the August 2009 killing of Yuldashev in a US drone strike, as the IMU's new leadership relocated the group to the Haqqani strongholds of Mir Ali and Miranshah in North Waziristan.

=== Return to Afghanistan and later events ===
The IMU became increasingly active in Afghanistan and was regularly cited as a terrorist threat by governments within and outside of the region. IMU fighters first started to become active in Afghanistan in 2007, fighting in the Taliban insurgency against Afghan and ISAF troops. From 2010 the IMU began to expand its presence into northern Afghanistan, particularly in ethnic Uzbek areas in and around Takhar Province. IMU commanders in northern Afghanistan integrated into the Taliban's shadow government, exercising governance in areas where the Afghan government's presence was weak.

Haji Seyit Dawud, director of the Afghan media-resources center in Kabul, claimed that the move to Afghanistan was natural as Islamic Movement of Uzbekistan was much more likely to find support in Afghanistan than in Pakistan. In Pakistan they were declared as foreign terrorist and Pakistan Army was killing them.

In June 2014, the Pakistan Armed Forces began a major military campaign against militant groups in North Waziristan, in the wake of the IMU and TTP's attack on Jinnah International Airport. There were media reports in the following months that many IMU fighters and their families fled these military operations and moved to Afghanistan.

After a period of declining relations between Afghan Talibans and Islamic Movement of Uzbekistan (IMU), the group pledged its allegiance Islamic State (IS).

IMU leader Usman Ghazi declared the group's support for the Islamic State of Iraq and the Levant (ISIS) in September 2014, however it continued to cooperate closely with the Taliban in Afghanistan, according to Afghan government sources.

In March 2015, a group of IMU militants in northern Afghanistan, led by Sadulla Urgenji, released a video in which they stated they no longer view the Taliban's Mullah Omar as leader and pledged allegiance to ISIS's Abu Bakr al-Baghdadi. This was followed by another video in July 2015, in which Sheikh Muhammad Ali, identified as the IMU's spiritual leader, swears allegiance to ISIS. In August 2015, a video was released by the group in which its leader, Usman Ghazi, leads IMU fighters in taking an oath of allegiance to ISIS and Abu Bakr al-Baghdadi. Ghazi also stated that the group should now be considered as fighters for ISIS's Afghanistan branch, Wilayat Khorasan. Following the pledge of allegiance, the Taliban launched an offensive against the IMU and forces loyal to dissident Taliban commander Mansoor Dadullah in Zabul Province, inflicting heavy casualties and effectively wiping out the group's presence in the province.

In June 2016, a new faction of the IMU announced itself, denouncing ISIS and expressing its loyalty to the Taliban and al Qaeda.

== Organization and leadership ==
=== Membership ===
While IMU was originally an ethnic Uzbek movement, its recruitment base expanded to include Central Asians (Afghans, Tajiks, Uyghurs and Turkmens) and as well as Arabs, Chechens and Westerners.

Hizb ut-Tahrir and the Islamic Movement of Uzbekistan received Uyghur recruits from the diaspora in Kyrgyzstan and Uzbekistan. The movement's goal is the takeover of Xinjiang and Central Asia. Uyghurs, Chechens, Uzbeks, Tajiks, Kyrgyz, Kazakhs and other ethnic groups flocked to serve under IMU leader Juma Namangani, who died in November 2001.

A number of the IMU's senior leaders and ideologues have been non-Uzbeks, including its Kyrgyz former military commander, Abbas Mansur, and its Mufti (religious authority), Abu Zar al-Burmi, a Pakistani national of Burmese Rohingya descent. In 2011, of the 87 "martyrs" that the IMU listed on its website, only four were Uzbeks from Uzbekistan, while 64 were from Afghanistan, 10 from Tajikistan, six from Kyrgyzstan, and one each from Tatarstan, Germany and Pakistan.

One of the mouthpieces of IMU was Abu Dher al Barmi. He was IMU's mufti, joining and then leaving ISIS in a video called (Arabic: المفتي ابو ذر عزام يتبرأ من تأييد تنظيم الدولة, romanized: Muftiy Abu Zar Azzom Davla jamoatidan bezor buldi).

Afghan troops liquidated Ammar Sahib. Usman Ghazi, Abu Usman Adil, Tahir Yuldashev, and Juma Namangani were among the commanders of the IMU.

=== Leadership ===
On 30 September 2009, a man claiming to be a bodyguard of Tahir Yuldashev reported that Yuldashev had been killed in a US missile airstrike that occurred shortly after the death of Pakistan Taliban chief Baitullah Mehsud. The next day, Pakistan and US officials confirmed this report. Almost a year later, the IMU website confirmed that Yuldashev had been killed on 27 August 2009 by a US Predator drone strike in South Waziristan, and described him as a Shaheed, or martyr.

On 17 August 2010, the IMU announced that Yuldashev's long-serving deputy, Abu Usman Adil, had been appointed the group's new leader. In his first statement, Adil called on his followers to wage jihad in the southern portion of Kyrgyzstan, in the wake of ethnic violence against the Uzbek minority. Adil was killed in an April 2012 US drone strike in Pakistan. In August 2012 the group announced that Adil's deputy, Usman Ghazi, was their new leader.

=== Funding ===
The IMU is alleged by the magazine Eurasia Critic to be involved in organized criminal activities such as controlling and facilitating drug smuggling. The IMU is alleged by the United States of America to receive funding from the Taliban and Al-Qaeda.

=== Media ===
The IMU's media arm is known as Jundallah Studio. It produces high-quality videos, publishes audio and written statements, and has released newsletters in Uzbek, Russian, Persian, Arabic, German, Burmese, Urdu and Pashto. The group also ran an Uzbek-language website called Furqon, which is no longer accessible.

== Claimed and alleged attacks ==
The Government of Uzbekistan accused the IMU of being involved in the 2004 Tashkent bombings, which left 33 militants, 10 policemen, and four civilian dead; however, an IMU splinter group called the Islamic Jihad Union later claimed responsibility.

The Tajik government announced that it was seeking 23 suspected IMU members who Tajik authorities say attacked supporters of Tajik President Imomali Rakhmonov on 28 September 2006, wounding two people.

In 2008, a number of men were arrested in eastern France, the Netherlands and Germany, for allegedly raising funds for the IMU between 2003 and 2008. Nine out of the ten men were convicted on 8 January 2013 in a Paris court.

The IMU and Taliban were blamed for the 28 May 2011 bombing in Taloqan, Afghanistan, that killed a top Afghan National Police commander, General Mohammed Daud Daud, and wounded the governor of Takhar Province and a German general.

An IMU suicide bomber was responsible for the December 2011 attack on the funeral of an Afghan government official in Takhar, killing 19 people, including Alhaj Mutalib Baig, an ethnic Uzbek Member of Parliament and former Tahkar Chief of Police.

=== IMU attacks on Pakistan ===
In April 2012, an estimated 150 IMU and TTP fighters launched a successful attack on Bannu Prison in Pakistan's Khyber Pakhtunkhwa Province, freeing nearly 400 prisoners, including Adnan Rashid, who was convicted of involvement in a 2003 assassination attempt against then-Pakistani President Pervez Musharraf.

The BBC reported that members of the IMU took part in the 15 December 2012 Peshawar airport attack, resulting in the deaths of 4 civilians and all 5 attackers.

In June 2014, the IMU claimed responsibility for an attack on Pakistan's Jinnah International Airport. At least 39 people were killed in the attack, including all 10 attackers.

A video released by the IMU in April 2015 showed members of the group beheading a Hazara man, one of 31 people kidnapped from a bus in Afghanistan in February 2015. The men threatened to kill more hostages unless their comrades are released from Afghan jails.

== Analysis ==
In September 2002, an aide to Wakil Ahmad Muttawakil, the Foreign Minister of the Taliban, claimed he had been sent prior to 9/11 to warn the U.S. government of an impending attack and to persuade them to take military action against Al Qaeda's presence in Afghanistan. The aide claimed advance knowledge of the attack came from Yuldashev, which if true would indicate a high degree of cooperation between Al-Qaeda and the IMU.

In his book Terror and Consent, Philip Bobbitt noted that Sultan Bashiruddin Mahmood, a scientist of the Pakistan Atomic Energy Commission, had met Osama bin Laden in Kabul in August 2001. Mahmood is said to have disclosed that bin Laden "insisted that he already had sufficient fissile material to build a [nuclear] bomb, having obtained it from former Soviet stockpiles through the Islamic Movement of Uzbekistan."

In 2003, A. Elizabeth Jones, the U.S. assistant secretary of state for Europe and Eurasia, testified on the threat of terrorism in Central Asia before the U.S. House of Representatives' subcommittee on the Middle East and Central Asia, arguing that the greatest threats were the IMU, and Hizb ut-Tahrir. Jones said that despite the death of Namangani, the "IMU is still active in the region -- particularly in Kyrgyzstan, Tajikistan, Uzbekistan, and Kazakhstan -- and it represents a serious threat to the region and therefore to our interests."

Mahmadsaid Juraqulov, head of the anti-organized crime department in the Interior Ministry of Tajikistan, told reporters in Dushanbe on 16 October 2006 that the "Islamic Movement of Turkestan is the Islamic Movement of Uzbekistan," and that Uzbek secret services manufactured the change in name. Juraqulov also said that the IMT was not a major security threat to Tajikistan or Kyrgyzstan. "Everyone knows that it is in Uzbekistan that [the IMU] wants to create problems. For them, Tajikistan and Kyrgyzstan are just regrouping bases they're trying to reach."

== Designation as a terrorist organization ==
Countries and organizations below have officially listed the Islamic Movement of Uzbekistan as a terrorist organization.

| Country | Date | References |
| Australia | April 2003 | |
| Canada | April 2003 | |
| Russia | February 2003 | |
| United Kingdom | 1 November 2002 | |
| European Union | 27 May 2002 | |
| United States | 25 September 2000 | |
| Pakistan | 15 March 2013 | |
| United Arab Emirates | | |

== See also ==
- 2014 Jinnah International Airport attack
