= United Tajik Opposition =

1993–1997 Tajikistani political alliance

- Tajik: Оппозицияи муттаҳидаи тоҷик Russian: Объединённая таджикская оппозиция
- Leader: Sayid Abdulloh Nuri
- Dates active: 1993–1997
- Ideology: Big tent: Islamist faction; Islamism; Pan-Islamism; Social conservatism; Democratic faction; Tajik nationalism; Liberal democracy; Secularism; Pamir Independence faction; Pamiri nationalism; Localism with Separation of powers; Liberal conservatism; Anti-communism
- Political position: Right-wing (Islamists and Pamiris); Centre-right (Democrats)
- Wars: the Civil war in Tajikistan

The United Tajik Opposition (Note: Tajik: Оппозицияи муттаҳидаи тоҷик, romanized: Oppozitsiyayi muttahidayi tojik, IPA: [ɐpɐˈzʲitsɨjəɪ mʊʔtʰɐhɪˈdaɪ tʰɔˈdʒik]; Russian: Объединённая таджикская оппозиция, romanized: Ob’jedinjonnaja tadžikskaja oppozicija, IPA: [ɐbjɪdʲɪˈnʲɵnːəjə tɐˈdʐ(ː)ɨkskəjə ɐpɐˈzʲitsɨjə]) (UTO) (Note: Tajik: ОМТ; Russian: ОТО) was an alliance of liberal, nationalist and Islamist forces that officially banded together in 1993, after the most violent phase of the Tajikistani Civil War. The UTO fought against the pro-communist and Khujandi government forces led by Emomali Rahmon, then Emomali Rakhmonov.

The UTO opposition consisted of the Islamic Renaissance Party (IRP), Rastokhez (Rebirth), the Democratic Party of Tajikistan (DPT), and Lali Badakhshan (Ruby of Badakshan). The UTO made successful advances against the Rakhmon government, pushing the leader to begin negotiations. In 1997, a peace treaty was concluded between the Rakhmon government and the UTO.

Following the treaty, several units of the Opposition became part of the Tajik National Army, becoming some of its most experienced units.

== Political leaders ==
- Sayid Abdulloh Nuri (chairman)
- Haji Akbar Turajanzade
- Mohammadsharif Khimmatzoda
- Davlat Khudonazarov
- Oinikhol Bobonazarova
- Juma Niyazov
- Abdunabi Sattorzoda
- Otakhon Latifi
- Kiemiddin Goziev
- Faiziddin Imomov
- Habibullo Sanginov
- Abdurakhim Karimov
- Atobek Amirbekov
- Muhammadali Faizmuhammad
- Mansur Jalilzoda
- Mirzomuhammadi Mirzokhodiev
