= List of wars involving Russia =

This is a list of wars and armed conflicts involving Russia and its predecessors in chronological order, from the 9th to the 21st century.

The Russian military and troops of its predecessor states in Russia took part in a large number of wars and armed clashes in various parts of the world: starting from the princely squads, opposing the raids of nomads, and fighting for the expansion of the territory of Kievan Rus'. Following the disintegration of Kievan Rus', the emergence of the Principality of Moscow and then the centralized Russian state saw a period of significant territorial growth of the state centred in Moscow and then St. Petersburg during the 15th to 20th centuries, marked by wars of conquest in Eastern Europe, the Caucasus, the Volga region, Siberia, Central Asia and the Far East, the world wars of the early 20th century, the proxy wars of the Cold War, and today.

The list includes:

- external wars
- foreign intervention in domestic conflicts
- anti-colonial uprisings of the peoples conquered during the Russian expansion
- princely feuds
- peasant uprisings
- revolutions

Legend of results:

Victory
Defeat
Another result; for example, a treaty or peace without a clear result, status quo ante bellum, indecisive, civil or internal conflict, or result unknown
Ongoing conflict

== Kievan Rus' ==
Date	Conflict	Location	Rus and its allies	Opponent(s)	Result
830s	Paphlagonian expedition of the Rusʹ		Rus' Khaganate	Byzantine Empire	Victory (Note: The veracity of this conflict is in doubt.)
860	Siege of Constantinople (860)		Rus' Khaganate	Byzantine Empire	Victory
907	Rus'–Byzantine War (907)		Kievan Rus'	Byzantine Empire	Victory
920–1036	Rus'–Pecheneg campaigns		Kievan Rus'	Pechenegs	Various results; eventually victory
941	Rus'–Byzantine War (941)		Kievan Rus'	Byzantine Empire	Defeat
944/945	Rus'-Byzantine War (944/945)		Kievan Rus'	Byzantine Empire	Victory
964–965	Sviatoslav's campaign against Khazars		Kievan Rus'	Khazar Khaganate	Victory: Destruction of the Khazar Khaganate
967/968–971	Sviatoslav's invasion of Bulgaria		Kievan Rus'	Byzantine Empire	Defeat
981	Vladimir the Great's campaign on Cherven Cities		Kievan Rus'	Duchy of Poland	Victory
985	Vladimir the Great's campaign against Volga Bulgaria		Kievan Rus'	Volga Bulgaria	Military victory, then agreement
987	Rus'–Byzantine War (987)		Kievan Rus'	Byzantine Empire	Military victory and agreement: Baptism of Vladimir and further Christianization of Kievan Rus'
1022	Yaroslav the Wise's attack on Brest		Kievan Rus'	Duchy of Poland	Defeat
1024	Rus'–Byzantine War (1024)		Kievan Rus'	Byzantine Empire	Defeat
1030	Yaroslav the Wise's campaign against Chud		Kievan Rus'	Chud	Victory: Estonian tribes start to pay tribute to Rus'
1030–1031	Yaroslav the Wise's campaign on Cherven Cities		Kievan Rus'	Duchy of Poland	Victory
1042–1228	Finnish–Novgorodian wars		Kievan Rus' (until 1136): Novgorod Republic	Baltic Finnic peoples of Fennoscandia (Yem people)	Various results, mostly victories: The wars' effect on the Finns' society contributed to the eventual Swedish conquest of western Finland circa 1249
1043	Rus'–Byzantine War (1043)		Kievan Rus'	Byzantine Empire	Defeat
1055–1223	Rus'–Cuman campaigns		Kievan Rus'	Cumans	Various results, mostly victories
1061	Sosols raid against Pskov		Kievan Rus'	Sosols	Defeat: Yaroslav the Wise's conquests in Estonia are lost
1132–1445	Swedish–Novgorodian Wars		Kievan Rus' (until 1136): Novgorod Republic	Kingdom of Sweden Kingdom of Norway (from 1319)	Stalemate after the Black Death
1147	Bolesław IV the Curly's raid on Old Prussians		Bolesław IV the Curly Kievan Rus'	Old Prussians	Victory
1203–1234	Campaigns of Rus princes against the Order of the Sword (see also Livonian Crusade)		Kievan Rus'; Vladimir-Suzdal; Principality of Polotsk; Principality of Smolensk; Novgorod Republic; Grand Duchy of Lithuania; Baltic peoples; Baltic Finnic peoples	Livonian Brothers of the Sword: Baltic Germans	Defeat: The crusaders capture Baltic lands up to the borders of Kievan Rus' and Lithuania
1223–1240	Mongol invasion of Rus'(see also List of Tatar and Mongol raids against Rus')		Vladimir-Suzdal; Kiev; Galicia-Volhynia; Novgorod Republic; Smolensk; Turov and Pinsk; Rostov; Chernigov; Ryazan; Pereyaslavl	Mongol Empire	Decisive defeat: The principalities of the Kievan Rus' became vassals of the Mongol Empire
1240–1242	Livonian campaign against Rus' (see also Northern Crusades)		Kievan Rus': Vladimir-Suzdal; Pskov Republic; Novgorod Republic	Teutonic Order; Livonian Order; Kingdom of Sweden: Kingdom of Denmark; Duchy of Estonia	Victory: Defeat of the Germans; Peace with Prince Alexander Nevsky; The waiving of claims on northern Rus'
1245	Alexandr Nevsky Lithuanian campaign		Kievan Rus': Vladimir-Suzdal; Pskov Republic; Novgorod Republic	Grand Duchy of Lithuania	Victory
1268	Battle of Wesenberg		Novgorod Republic; Vladimir-Suzdal Pskov Republic	Denmark: Duchy of Estonia; Teutonic Order: Livonian Order	Both sides claim victory

== Principality of Moscow (1263–1547) ==
Date	Conflict	Combatant 1	Combatant 2	Result
1281–1293/4	Vladimir-Suzdal war of succession (1281–1293): Casus belli: death of Alexander Nevsky (1263).; Duden's campaign (summer–autumn 1293) (part of the Tokhta–Nogai war)	Nogai forces Dmitry of Pereslavl; Mikhail of Tver; Daniel of Moscow	Tode Mongke (1281–1287); Tokhta forces Andrey of Gorodets; Theodore the Black; Rostov princes	Tokhta victory: Vladimir, Moscow and Tver sacked, countryside devastated; Dmitry of Pereslavl fled, died in 1294; Andrey of Gorodets became indisputed Grand Prince of Vladimir
1296/8–1302	Struggle for Pereslavl-Zalessky	Daniel of Moscow; Mikhail of Tver Tokhta	Andrey of Gorodets; Theodore the Black; Konstantin of Ryazan	Muscovite–Tverian victory: Moscow sacked (1298); Moscow temporarily acquired Pereslavl-Zalessky (lost in 1340/1)
1305–1485	Muscovite–Tverian wars (series of short wars, mixed with other conflicts)	Principality of Moscow	Principality of Tver	Victory: Tver annexed by Moscow (1485)
1327	Tver Uprising of 1327 (part of the Muscovite–Tverian wars)	Golden Horde; Ivan I Kalita of Moscow; Alexander of Suzdal	Principality of Tver; Grand Principality of Vladimir (Note: The title 'Grand Prince of Vladimir' was mostly titular by the early 14th century.)	Golden Horde victory: Aleksandr of Tver stripped of land holdings and later executed
1368–1372	Lithuanian–Muscovite War (1368–72) (part of the Great Troubles and the Muscovite–Tverian wars)	Principality of Moscow	Grand Duchy of Lithuania Principality of Tver	Inconclusive: Treaty of Lyubutsk
1376	Muscovite–Volga Bulgars war (part of the Great Troubles)	Principality of Moscow	Volga Bulgaria	Victory
1377	Battle on Pyana River (part of the Great Troubles)	Principality of Moscow	Golden Horde	Defeat
1378	Battle of the Vozha River (part of the Great Troubles)	Principality of Moscow	Golden Horde	Victory
1380	Battle of Kulikovo (part of the Great Troubles)	Rus' principalities: Principality of Moscow (Dmitri Donskoy); Principality of Beloozero; Principality of Yaroslavl; Principality of Rostov; Principality of Starodub; Principality of Mologa; Principality of Kashin; Princes from Vyazma and Dorogobuzh; Part of Upper Oka Principalities; Lithuanian princes of Polotsk and Bryansk in exile	Western part of the Golden Horde: European mercenaries	Victory for the Rus' principalities coalition: Moscow replaced Tver as the most prominent of the northeastern Rus' principalities
1382	Siege of Moscow (part of the aftermath of the Great Troubles)	Principality of Moscow	Golden Horde	Defeat: Dmitri Donskoy forced to reaffirm allegiance to the Golden Horde, and resumed paying the tribute
1406–1408	Lithuanian–Muscovite War (1406–1408) (part of the Muscovite–Lithuanian Wars)	Principality of Moscow	Grand Duchy of Lithuania	Hungarian Treaty (1 September 1408): Lithuania receives Principality of Smolensk and Upper Oka Principalities; Muscovy receives the cities of Kozelsk, Lyubutsk and Peremyshl
1425–1453	Muscovite War of Succession	Younger Donskoy line Vasily II Vasilyevich; Dmitry II Shemyaka (1434–9); Boris of Tver (c. 1438); Mäxmüd of Kazan (1445–8); Qasim Khan (1452–3)	Older Donskoy line Yury Dmitrievich (1425–34); Vasily Kosoy (1434–6); Ulugh of Kazan (1437–45); Dmitry II Shemyaka (1439; 1445–53); Ivan of Mozhaysk (1447–53)	Vasily II victory: Younger lineage of Dmitry Donskoy gained the Muscovite throne
1437–1445	Ulugh Muhammad's campaign (first Russo-Kazan war) (from Battle of Belyov to Battle of Suzdal) (connected with the Muscovite War of Succession)	Younger Donskoy line Vasily II Vasilyevich; Dmitry II Shemyaka (1437–9)	Older Donskoy line Ulugh of Kazan; Dmitry II Shemyaka (1439)	Ulugh victory: Ulugh captured Vasily II Vasilyevich (1445); Ulugh's successor Mäxmüd made Vasily II his vassal; Dmitry Shemyaka seized Moscow in Vasily II's absence
1467–1469	Qasim War	Grand Principality of Moscow: Qasim Khanate	Khanate of Kazan	Victory: Kazan released all ethnic Christian Russians enslaved in the preceding four decades
1471	Battle of Shelon	Grand Principality of Moscow	Novgorod Republic	Victory: Novgorod Republic annexed by the Grand Principality of Moscow in 1478
1478	Siege of Kazan	Grand Principality of Moscow	Khanate of Kazan	Victory: The Kazan Khan imprisoned and replaced by his half-brother
1480	Great Stand on the Ugra River	Grand Principality of Moscow	Golden Horde	Debated: Traditional Russian historiography: Muscovite victory, and the end of the Mongol-Tatar yoke in Russia; Modern Western scholarly historiography: Insignificant non-battle, embellished in later accounts; Moscow retained formal relations with Tatar khanates and continued paying tribute to the Crimean Khanate for decades
1480–1481	Russian-Livonian War (1480-1481)	Russia	Livonian Confederation	Victory
1485	Capture of Tver (1485) (part of the Muscovite–Tverian wars)	Grand Principality of Moscow	Principality of Tver	Victory: Principality of Tver annexed by the Grand Principality of Moscow
1487–1494	First Muscovite-Lithuanian War	Grand Principality of Moscow	Grand Duchy of Lithuania	Victory
1495–1497	Russo-Swedish War	Grand Principality of Moscow	Sweden	Inconclusive
1500–1503	Second Muscovite–Lithuanian War	Grand Principality of Moscow	Grand Duchy of Lithuania Livonian Order	Victory
1505–1507	Russo-Kazan War	Grand Principality of Moscow	Khanate of Kazan	Inconclusive
1507–1508	Third Muscovite–Lithuanian War	Grand Principality of Moscow	Grand Duchy of Lithuania Crimean Khanate	Inconclusive
1512–1522	Fourth Muscovite–Lithuanian War	Grand Principality of Moscow Livonian Order	Grand Duchy of Lithuania: Kingdom of Poland; Crimean Khanate	Victory
1534–1537	Fifth Muscovite–Lithuanian War	Grand Principality of Moscow	Grand Duchy of Lithuania: Kingdom of Poland; Crimean Khanate	Inconclusive

== Tsardom of Russia (1547–1721) ==
Date	Conflict	Location	Russia and its allies	Opponent(s)	Result
1552	Siege of Kazan	Tatarstan	Russia	Khanate of Kazan	Victory: The annexation of Kazan into Russia
1552–1556	Tatar Rebellion	Tatarstan	Russia	Tatar rebels	Victory: The rebellion is crushed
1554–1557	Ivan the Terrible's Swedish War	Karelia	Russia	Sweden	Inconclusive: Treaty of Novgorod
1556	Russian conquest of Astrakhan	Astrakhan	Russia	Astrakhan Khanate	Victory: The annexation of Astrakhan into Russia
1558–1562	Ivan the Terrible's Livonian Campaign	Livonia	Russia	Livonian Confederation	Victory: Destruction of the Livonian state; Truce with Poland and Lithuania
1562–1570	Russo-Lithuanian War	Northern Europe	Russia	Polish–Lithuanian union	Victory
1558–1583	Livonian War	Northern Europe	Russia; Livonia	Livonian Confederation; Denmark–Norway; Sweden; Polish–Lithuanian union (after 1569, Poland-Lithuania	Defeat: Truce of Jam Zapolski; Treaty of Plussa
1568–1570	Astrakhan Expedition	Astrakhan and Azov	Russia	Ottoman Empire; Crimean Khanate	Victory: Treaty of Constantinople (1570)
1570–1572	Ivan the Terrible's Crimean War	European Russia	Russia	Crimean Khanate	Victory: The Crimean Tatars burn Moscow in 1571; The Russians defeat the Crimean Tatars at the Battle of Molodi in 1572; The independence of Russia and its conquests in the Volga region preserved
1580–1762	Russian conquest of Siberia	Siberia	Russia: Cossacks; Pro-Russian native Siberians	Khanate of Sibir (until 1598) Native Siberians	Victory: The start of Russian annexation of Siberia
1590–1595	Boris Godunov's Swedish War	Northern Europe	Russia	Sweden	Inconclusive: Treaty of Teusina; Мutual territorial concessions
1605–1618	Polish invasions of Russia	Russia	Russia; Sweden (1609–1610)	Poland–Lithuania	Defeat
1606–1607	Bolotnikov Rebellion	Russia	Russia	Rebels under Ivan Bolotnikov	Victory: The rebellion is crushed
1610–1617	Ingrian War	Russia	Russia	Sweden	Defeat: Treaty of Stolbovo
1632–1634	Smolensk War	Smolensk	Russia	Poland–Lithuania	Defeat: Treaty of Polyanovka
1651–1653	Alexis I's Persian War	North Caucasus	Russia	Persia	Defeat
1652–1689	Sino–Russian border conflicts	Heilongjiang and Amur	Russia; Cossacks	(Qing dynasty) China; (Joseon) Korea	Defeat: Treaty of Nerchinsk
1654–1667	First Northern War	Eastern Europe	Russia: Cossack Hetmanate	Poland-Lithuania; Crimean Khanate	Victory: Truce of Andrusovo
1656–1658	Second Northern War	Northern Europe	Russia	Sweden	Inconclusive: Treaty of Valiesar; Treaty of Cardis
1662–1664	First Bashkir Rebellion	Bashkortostan	Russia	Bashkir rebels	Inconclusive; political defeat: The Russian government was forced to accept Bashkir demands
1665–1720	Dzungar–Russian conflicts	Southern Siberia	Tsardom of Russia	Dzungar Khanate	Defeat
1665–1667	Dzungar conquest of Yenisei	Yenisei, Siberia	Tsardom of Russia Altan Khanate	Dzungar Khanate	Defeat
1670–1671	Razin's Rebellion	Russia	Russia	Cossacks under Stepan Razin	Victory: The rebellion is crushed
1676–1681	Feodor III's Turkish War	Ukraine	Russia	Ottoman Empire; Crimean Khanate	Indecisive: Treaty of Bakhchisarai
1683–1700	Great Turkish War	Eastern Europe	Russia (from 1686); Austria; Poland–Lithuania; Cossack Hetmanate	Ottoman Empire; Crimean Khanate	Victory: Treaty of Constantinople; Russia stops paying regular tribute to Crimea
1700–1721	Great Northern War	Europe	Russia; Denmark–Norway (except 1700–1709); Saxony (except 1706–1709); Poland–Lithuania (except 1704–1709); Cossack Hetmanate (until 1708); Prussia (from 1715); (Province of Hanover) Hanover (from 1715); Great Britain (1717–1719)	Sweden; Holstein-Gottorp; Poland-Lithuania (1704–1709); Ottoman Empire (1710–1714); Cossack Hetmanate (1708–09); Great Britain (1700, 1719–1921)	Victory against Sweden: Treaty of Nystad
1700–1721	Great Northern War	Europe	Russia; Denmark–Norway (except 1700–1709); Saxony (except 1706–1709); Poland–Lithuania (except 1704–1709); Cossack Hetmanate (until 1708); Prussia (from 1715); (Province of Hanover) Hanover (from 1715); Great Britain (1717–1719)	Sweden; Holstein-Gottorp; Poland-Lithuania (1704–1709); Ottoman Empire (1710–1714); Cossack Hetmanate (1708–09); Great Britain (1700, 1719–1921)	Defeat by Ottoman Empire: Treaty of the Pruth
1704–1711	Third Bashkir Rebellion	Bashkortostan and Tatarstan	Russia	Bashkir rebels	Military victory, political defeat: Russian government forced to accept some Bashkir demands
1707–1708	Bulavin Rebellion	Southern Russia	Russia	Don Cossack rebels	Victory: The rebellion is crushed
1716	Buccholz's expedition	Irtysh, Kazakhstan	Tsardom of Russia	Dzungar Khanate	Defeat
1717	Peter the Great's Khivan War	Khanate of Khiva	Russia	Khanate of Khiva	Defeat: Russian invasion repelled
1719–1720	Likharev's expedition	Lake Zaysan, Kazakhstan	Tsardom of Russia	Dzungar Khanate	Defeat

== Russian Empire (1721–1917) ==
Date	Conflict	Location	Russia and its allies	Opponent(s)	Result
1722–1723	Persian Expedition of Peter the Great	Caucasus and northern Iran	Russia; Cossack Hetmanate; Armenia; Georgia	Persia	Victory: Treaty of Saint Petersburg
1723–1726	Kazakh–Kalmyk War (1723–1726)	Volga–Yaik interfluve, Northern Caspian region	Russian Empire: Kalmyk Khanate	Kazakh Khanate	Peaceful agreement
1725–1778	Russian conquest of Chukotka	Chukotka	Russia; Chuvans; Koryaks; Yukagirs	Chukchi people	Inconclusive: Attempts to impose a tribute failed in the long run.; The Chukchi accepted the agreement on submission, while maintaining a high degree of autonomy.
1733–1738	War of the Polish Succession Rhineland	Poland	Poland under Augustus III; Russia; Austria; Saxony; Prussia	Poland–Lithuania under Stanisław Leszczyński; France; Spain; Sardinia	Indecisive: Treaty of Vienna
1735–1739	Russo-Austro-Turkish War	Eastern Europe	Russia: Cossack Hetmanate; (Habsburg monarchy) Austria	Ottoman Empire: (Autonomous Republic of Crimea) Crimea	Victory: Russian victory; Austrian defeat; Treaty of Niš
1735–1740	Fourth Bashkir Rebellion	Bashkortostan	Russia: (Russian Empire) pro-Russian Bashkirs	Bashkir rebels	Victory: The rebellion is crushed; Establishment of Orenburg
1739–1741	Kazakh–Dzungar War (1739–1741)	Ishim, Syr Darya, Kazakhstan	Kazakh Khanate; Russian Empire	Dzungar Khanate	Defeat
1740–1748	War of the Austrian Succession	Europe	Austria; Great Britain; (Province of Hanover) Hanover; Russia (1741–1743, 1748); Dutch Republic; Saxony (1743–1745); Sardinia	Prussia (1740–1742, 1744–45); Spain (1740–1746); France; Bavaria (1741–1745); Saxony (1741–42); (Kingdom of the Two Sicilies) Naples; Genoa; Sweden (1741–1743)	Inconclusive: Treaty of Aix-la-Chapelle
1741–1743	Russo-Swedish War (1741–1743)	Northern Europe	Russia	Sweden	Victory: Treaty of Åbo
1743–1744, 1746–1747	Abul Khair–Neplyuyev conflict	Modern-day Kazakhstan and Russia	Russian Empire: Kalmyk Khanate	Kazakh Khanate	Defeat
1756–1763	Seven Years' War	Europe and North America	France; Austria; Spain; Sweden; Russia (1756–1762); Saxony	Prussia; Britain; (Province of Hanover) Hanover; Brunswick-Wolfenbüttel; Portugal; Hesse-Kassel; Schaumburg-Lippe; Iroquois Confederacy	White peace: Treaty of Saint Petersburg; Defeat of Russia's former allies
1768–1769	Koliivshchyna Rebellion	Ukraine	Russia Poland-Lithuania	Haidamaky	Victory: The rebellion is crushed
1768–1772	War of the Bar Confederation	Poland	Russia	(Kingdom of France) France; (Poland) Bar Confederation	Victory: Treaty of Kuçuk Kainarji; First Partition of Poland
1768–1774	Catherine the Great's First Turkish War	Eastern Europe, Caucasus and Mediterranean	Russia	Ottoman Empire: (Autonomous Republic of Crimea) Crimea	Victory: Treaty of Küçük Kaynarca
1771	1771 Torghut migration	Volga river, Emba river, Yaik river, Or, Sagyz rivers, Aktobe Region, Turgai River, Karaganda Region, Lake Balkhash, Russia and Kazakhstan	Russian Empire: Kazakh Khanate	Kalmyk Khanate	Inconclusive
1773–1775	Pugachev's Rebellion	Russia	Russia	Rebels under Yemelyan Pugachev; Ottoman Empire	Victory: The rebellion is crushed
1787–1792	Catherine the Great's Second Turkish War	Eastern Europe	Russia	Ottoman Empire	Victory: Treaty of Jassy
1783–1797	Syrym Datuly's rebellion	Kazakhstan	Russia	Kazakhs	Victory
1788–1790	Catherine the Great's Swedish War	Finland, western Sweden, and the Baltic Sea	Russia	Sweden	Inconclusive
1792	Catherine the Great's Polish War	Poland	Russia Targowica Confederation	Poland–Lithuania	Victory: Second Partition of Poland
1794	Kościuszko Uprising	Poland	Russia; (Kingdom of Prussia) Prussia	Poland–Lithuania	Victory: The uprising is crushed; Third Partition of Poland; Poland ceases to exist as an independent country
1796	Persian Expedition of Catherine the Great	North Caucasus and South Caucasus	Russia	Persia	Victory
1799–1802	War of the Second Coalition	Europe	Austria; Holy Roman Empire; Great Britain (United Kingdom from 1801); Russia (until 1799); (Kingdom of France) French Royalists; Portugal; Two Sicilies; Ottoman Empire	(France) French First Republic; Spain; Denmark–Norway; (Poland) Polish Legions; French client states	Withdrawal in 1799: French victory in 1802
1803–1806	War of the Third Coalition	Europe	Austria; Russia; United Kingdom; (Kingdom of the Two Sicilies) Sicily; (Kingdom of the Two Sicilies) Naples; Portugal; Sweden	France; French client states	Defeat: Peace of Pressburg
1804–1813	Alexander I's Persian War	North Caucasus, South Caucasus and northern Iran	Russia	Persia	Victory: Treaty of Gulistan
1806–1807	War of the Fourth Coalition	Eastern and Central Europe	Prussia; United Kingdom; Saxony; Sweden; Russia; Naples	France; French client states; Spain; Confederation of the Rhine; Bavaria; Württemberg; (Kingdom of Italy (Napoleonic)) Italy; (Kingdom of Naples) Naples; Polish Legions	Defeat: Treaties of Tilsit
1806–1812	Alexander I's Turkish War	Romania, Moldova, Caucasus and Black Sea	Russia	Ottoman Empire	Victory: Treaty of Bucharest
1807–1812	Anglo-Russian War	Baltic Sea and Barents Sea	Russia	United Kingdom	Inconclusive: Treaty of Orebro
1808–1809	Finnish War	Finland and Sweden	Russia	Sweden	Victory: Treaty of Fredrikshamn
1809	War of the Fifth Coalition	Central Europe	France; Confederation of the Rhine; (Kingdom of Italy (Napoleonic)) Italy; Spain; Duchy of Warsaw; Russia	Austria; United Kingdom; Naples; Sardinia	Victory (limited involvement): Treaty of Schönbrunn
1812	French invasion of Russia	Russia	Russia	France; French client states	Victory: The French invasion is repelled; Napoleon's Grand Army is destroyed and forced to retreat
1813–1814	War of the Sixth Coalition	Europe	Austria; Prussia; United Kingdom; Sweden; Russia; Spain; Portugal; (Kingdom of the Two Sicilies) Naples; Sardinia	France; French client states	Victory: Treaty of Fontainebleau; Treaty of Paris
1815	War of the Seventh Coalition	Europe	Austria; Prussia; United Kingdom; Russia; (Province of Hanover) Hanover; Nassau; Brunswick; Sweden; United Netherlands; Spain; Portugal; Sardinia; (Kingdom of the Two Sicilies) Two Sicilies; Tuscany; Switzerland; (Kingdom of France) French Royalists	(France) First French Empire; (Kingdom of the Two Sicilies) Naples	Victory: Treaty of Paris
1817–1864	Caucasian War	Caucasus	Russia; Mingrelia; Guria	Caucasian Imamate; Circassia; Big Kabarda (until 1825); Abkhazian insurgents; Kazi-Kumukh; Dagestan free people; Avaria (1829–1859); Svaneti	Victory: Annexation of North Caucasus into Russia; Surrender of Imam Shamil
1825	Decembrist revolt	Saint Petersburg	Russia	Decembrist rebels	Victory: The revolt is crushed
1826–1836	Uprising of Sarzhan Kasimov	Kazakhstan	Russia	Kazakhs	Victory
1826–1828	Nicholas I's Persian War	South Caucasus and northern Iran	Russia	Persia	Victory: Treaty of Turkmenchay
1827	Greek War of Independence	Greece	United Kingdom; France; Russia	Ottoman Empire	Victory
1828–1829	Nicholas I's Turkish War	Balkans and Caucasus	Russia	Ottoman Empire	Victory: Treaty of Adrianople
1830–1831	November uprising	Poland	Russia	Poland	Victory: The uprising is crushed
1836–1838	Bukey Horde uprising	Kazakhstan	Russia	Kazakhs	Victory
1837–1847	Kenesary's Rebellion	Kazakhstan	Russia	Kazakhs	Victory: Fall of Kazakh Khanate
1839–1841	Second Turko-Egyptian War	Syria and Lebanon	United Kingdom; (Austrian Empire) Austria; (Russian Empire) Russia; Ottoman Empire	Egypt; France; Spain	Victory: Egypt renounces its claim to Syria
1839–1840	Khivan campaign of 1839	Central Asia	Russia	Khanate of Khiva	Defeat
1841	Gurian rebellion	Georgia	Russia	Gurian rebels	Victory: The rebellion is crushed
1842	Shoorcha rebellion	Tatarstan and Ulyanovsk	Russia	Tatar, Mari and Chuvash peasants	Victory: The rebellion is crushed
1842–1868	Russian conquest of Bukhara	Central Asia	Russia	Emirate of Bukhara	Victory
1848–1849	Hungarian Revolution of 1848	Hungary	(Austrian Empire) Austria: Croatia; Serbian Vojvodina; Serbian volunteers; Pro-Habsburg Hungarians; Slovak National Council; Transylvanian Romanians; Chief Rus' Council; Czech volunteers; Bohemian and Moravian volunteers; Transylvanian Saxons; Russia	Hungary; Hungarian Slovenes; Pro-Hungarian Slovaks; Rusyns; Zipser Germans; Hungarian Germans; Croats from Western Hungary and Međimurje; Šokac and Bunjevac people; Banat Bulgarians; Polish legions; German legion; Viennese legion; Italian legion	Victory: The revolution is crushed
1850–1868	Russian conquest of Kokand Khanate	Central Asia	Russia	Khanate of Kokand	Victory
1853–1856	Crimean War	Crimea, Balkans, Caucasus, Black Sea, Baltic Sea, White Sea and Far East	Russia	France; Ottoman Empire; United Kingdom; Sardinia	Defeat: Treaty of Paris
1858	Mahtra Rebellion	Estonia	Russia	Estonian peasants	Victory: The rebellion is crushed
1861	Bezdna Revolt	Tatarstan	Russia	Peasants	Victory: The revolt is crushed
1863–1864	January Uprising	Poland	Russia	Polish, Lithuanian and Ukrainian insurgents	Victory: The uprising is crushed
1866	Polish rebellion in Siberia	Siberia	Russia	Polish political exiles	Victory: The rebellion is crushed
1868–1869	Uprising in the Ural and Turgai Oblasts	Kazakhstan	Russia	Kazakhs	Victory
1870	Adai Rebellion	Kazakhstan	Russia	Kazakhs	Victory
1873	Khivan campaign of 1873	Central Asia	Russia	Khanate of Khiva	Victory
1877–1878	Russo-Turkish War	Balkans and Caucasus	Russia; Romania; Bulgarian volunteers; Serbia; Montenegro	Ottoman Empire	Victory: Treaty of San Stefano; Treaty of Berlin; Reestablishment of the Bulgarian state; De jure independence of Romania, Serbia and Montenegro from the Ottoman Empire; The annexation of Kars and Batum into Russia
1890	Kukunian Expedition	Unknown	Ottoman Empire Kurdish troops Russian Empire	Armenian Revolutionary Federation	Victory: The defeat of Kukunyan against the Ottoman and Kurdish forces; Kukunyan and his army were captured and arrested by the Russian Empire and exiled to Siberia.
1897–1898	Cretan Revolt (1897–1898)	Crete	Cretan revolutionaries; Greece; United Kingdom; France; (Kingdom of Italy) Italy; (Russian Empire) Russia; Austria–Hungary (until 12 April 1898); German Empire (until 16 March 1898)	Ottoman Empire	Victory: Establishment of the Cretan State; Withdrawal of Ottoman forces from Crete
1899–1901	Boxer Rebellion	China	Eight-Nation Alliance British Empire Russia Japan France Germany United States Italy Austria-Hungary: Netherlands; Spain; Belgium; (Qing dynasty) Mutual Defence Pact of Southeast China (after 1900)	Boxer movement; Qing dynasty (after 1900)	Eight-Nation Alliance victory
1902–1906	Rebellion in Guria	Georgia	Russia	Gurian Republic	Victory: The rebellion is crushed
1904–1905	Russo-Japanese War	Manchuria, Korean Peninsula and Yellow Sea	Russia	Japan	Defeat: Treaty of Portsmouth
1905–1907	Russian Revolution of 1905	Russia	Russia	Revolutionaries Supported by: Saint Petersburg Soviet; Moscow City Duma; Chita Republic; Party of Socialist Revolutionaries; Russian Social Democratic Labour Party; Kagal	Victory: Revolutionaries defeated; Nicholas II retains the throne; October Manifesto; Constitution enacted; Establishment of the State Duma
1905–1911	Persian Constitutional Revolution	Iran	Persia; Russia (from 1906)	Iranian constitutionalists	Victory: Russian occupation of Northern Iran until 1917
1911	Mongolian Revolution of 1911	Mongol heartland	Mongolian nationalists Supported by:Russia	China	Victory: Establishment of Bogd Khanate of Mongolia as independent of China.; Tuva becomes a Russian protectorated called Uryankhay Krai
1914–1917	World War I	Europe and Asia	Allied Powers (see list)	Central Powers: Germany; Austria-Hungary; Ottoman Empire; Bulgaria	Defeat, later allied victory: Separate peace at Treaty of Brest-Litovsk; Russian Civil War; Paris Peace Conference
1917	February Revolution	Petrograd, Russian Empire	Government: Petrograd Police; Gendarmes; Ministry of Internal Affairs; Petrograd Garrison; Monarchists: Russian Assembly; Monarchist Union; Union of the Russian Nation	Socialists: Socialist Revolutionary Party; Russian Social Democratic Labour Party; Bolsheviks; Mensheviks; Dashnaks; Liberals: Kadets; Octobrists; Progressive Party	Revolutionary victory: End of the monarchy; Period of dual power between the Provisional Government and the Petrograd Soviet; Proclamation of the Republic; October Revolution and start of the Russian Civil War

== Russian Republic (1917) ==
Date	Conflict	Location	Russia and its allies	Opponent(s)	Result
1917	October Revolution	Russia	Russia	Bolsheviks; Petrograd Soviet; Left SRs; Red Guards	Revolution succeeds: Dissolution of the Russian Provisional Government; The Second All-Russian Congress of Soviets proclaims itself the supreme governing body in the country; Constituent Assembly election held under heavy Bolshevik pressure; Beginning of the Russian Civil War

== Russian SFSR (1917–1922) ==
Date	Conflict	Location	Russia and its allies	Opponent(s)	Result
1917–1922	Russian Civil War	Eastern Europe to Central Asia and Far East	Russian SFSR; Far Eastern Republic; Mongolian Communists; Makhnovshchina; Left SR; Green armies	(Russia) White Movement; Mountain Republic; Makhnovshchina; Left SR; Green armies; Britain; Japan; Czechoslovakia; Greece; United States; France; Serbia; Romania; Italy; China; Mongolia	Victory of Bolshevik forces in Russia, Ukraine, Belarus, South Caucasus, Central Asia, Tuva, and Mongolia; incorporation of those territories into the Soviet Union; Victory for independence movements in Finland, Estonia, Latvia, Lithuania, and Poland; expulsion of Bolshevik forces from those territories; Allied intervention in the Russian Civil War withdraw from 1920 to 1925.
1917–1921	Ukrainian-Soviet War (Ukrainian War of Independence)	Ukraine and Eastern Poland	Russian SFSR; Ukrainian SSR; Makhnovshchina	Ukrainian People's Republic; West Ukrainian People's Republic; German Empire (1918); Poland (1920–1921); Hetmanate of Ukraine; White Movement; German Empire (1917–1918); Romania (1918); Poland (1918–1919); France (1919); Greece (1919)	Victory: Formation of the Ukrainian SSR and its incorporation into the Soviet Union; Destruction of the Ukrainian People's Republic
1917–1920	Central Powers intervention in the Russian Civil War: Operation Faustschlag; Crimea Operation (1918); German Caucasus expedition; Armenian–Azerbaijani war (1918–1920)	Eastern Europe and Caucasus	Bolsheviks: Russian SFSR; Finnish Socialist Workers' Republic; Commune of Estonia; Lithuanian SSR; Latvia; Iskolat (Note: 1917–1918); Latvian SSR (Note: 1918–1920); Ukrainian Soviet Republics: * Taurida SSR (Note: 1918); Crimean SSR (Note: 1919); Odessa SR; DK SR; Ukrainian SR; Rumcherod; Baku Commune; Makhnovshchina	Central Powers: In support of: White movement Don Republic (Belarusian Democratic Republic) Belarus German Empire; Finland; Georgia; Crimea; Austria-Hungary; Ottoman Empire; Azerbaijan; Ukrainian State Mountainous Republic of the Northern Caucasus; Landeswehr; Freikorps (Note: 1918–19); Bermontians Non-aligned Separatists: Estonia Latvia Lithuania Directorate of Ukraine Czechoslovak Legion Transcaucasian Republic Supported by: Allied Powers: United Kingdom; France and others	Pyrrhic Victory: Treaty of Brest-Litovsk is annulled, putting an end to German Mitteleuropa and Lebensraum, and Ottoman Pan-Turkist aspirations, against Russian economic independence.; Planned German client states, such as the United Baltic Duchy, Duchy of Courland and Semigallia, Kingdom of Lithuania and Kingdom of Poland, still fight for their independence and join the Allies.; Start of Finnish Civil War and Allied intervention in the Russian Civil War
1917–1920	Allied intervention in the Russian Civil War: North Russia intervention; British campaign in the Baltic (1918–1919); Southern Russia intervention; Siberian intervention; Chinese occupation of Mongolia; North Persia Force campaign; Malleson mission	Northwest Russia, Southern Russia, Russian Central Asia and Siberia	Bolsheviks: Soviet Russia; Far Eastern Republic (1920–1922); Latvian SSR (1918–1920); Ukrainian SSR (1922–1925); Mongolian People's Party; Persian Socialist Soviet Republic; Central Powers (until 1918): Germany Austria-Hungary Ottoman Empire Bulgaria	Allied Powers: White movement; Czechoslovak Legion (1918–1919); Belgium (1918–1919); United Kingdom (1918–1920); Canada (1918–1919); Australia (1918–1919); India; South Africa; United States (1918–1920); France (1918–1920); Japan (1918–1922); China (1919–1921); Poland; Greece; Estonia; Latvia; Serbia; Italy; Romania; Ukrainian People's Republic (1918–1921); Mongolia; (Iran) Qajar Persia (1918–1920)	Stalemate: Allied victory against Central Powers, taking advantage of former German and Ottoman Puppet states.; Bolshevik pyrrhic victory against Allied Powers incursions to support the White movement and some separatists movements, although losing territories of former Russian Empire.; Japanese war in Siberia continues alone until 1922.
1917–1918	Belarusian-Soviet conflict	Belarus	Russian SFSR; (Russian Soviet Federative Socialist Republic) Belarusian communists	(Belarusian Democratic Republic) Belarus; German Empire; Poland	Temporary defeat: After German retreat, Soviet reconquest of Belarus and Polish–Soviet War.
1917–1920	Kazakhstan Campaign	Kazakhstan	Russian SFSR	Alash Autonomy (Russia) White Movement	Victory: Overthrow of the Alash Autonomy; incorporation of Kazakhstan into the Soviet Union
1918	Romanian intervention in Bessarabia	Moldavia and Bessarabia	Rumcherod (19–30 January) Odessa SR (30 January–8 March) Romanian Revolutionary Military Committee (Feb.) Moldavian Democratic Republic (pro-Bolshevik factions) Supported by: Soviet Russia Soviet Ukraine Odessa Committee for the Salvation of Bessarabia	Kingdom of Romania: (Romania) Transylvanians-Bukovinians; Moldavian Democratic Republic (anti-Bolshevik factions) Russian Republic Ukrainian People's Republic German Empire Austria-Hungary	Defeat: Start of Bessarabian question after Union of Bessarabia with Romania.
1918	Finnish Civil War	Finland	Russian SSR; Red Guard	White Guard; (German Empire) Germany	Defeat: Victory of the White Guard in Finland; expulsion of Bolshevik forces and Finnish independence
1918–1929	Heimosodat	Finland, Karelia, Estonia and Northern Russia	Russian SFSR; Finnish Red Guards; Commune of Estonia; United Kingdom; (Viena expedition and Petsamo expeditions)	Finnish White Guard; Estonia; (Republic of Uhtua) Uhtua; (Republic of Uhtua) Forest Guerrillas; North Ingria; United Kingdom (Estonian War of Independence)	Stalemate: Finnish victory in Estonia and Petsamo Province; Soviet victory in East Karelia and Northern Russia.
1918–1920	Armenian–Azerbaijani war	Caucasus	Russian SFSR: (Azerbaijan Soviet Socialist Republic) Azerbaijani communists; (Armenian Soviet Socialist Republic) Armenian communists; (Ottoman Empire) Turkish revolutionaries	(First Republic of Armenia) Armenia: (Azerbaijan Democratic Republic) Azerbaijan; Ottoman Empire; Republic of Aras (1918–1919)	Stalemate: Start of Soviet invasion of Armenia and of Azerbaijan, along Turkish–Armenian War.; End of Russo-Turkish wars in Caucassus.
1918	German Caucasus expedition	Caucasus	Russian SFSRBaku Commune Centrocaspian Dictatorship: Armenian Revolutionary Federation; United Kingdom	German Empire: (Georgia (country)) Georgia; Ottoman Empire: Azerbaijan	Inconclusive due to the end of the Caucasus campaign.
1918–1919	Sochi conflict	Georgia–Russia border	Russian SFSR; Armed Forces of South Russia; Ottoman Empire	(Georgia (country)) Georgia	Indecisive: Sochi and Tuapse transferred to the Russian SFSR; Gagra transferred to Georgia
1918–1919	German revolution of 1918–1919	Germany and Eastern Europe	Soviet Republics [Communists]: People's State of Bavaria; Bavarian Soviet Republic; Bremen Soviet Republic; Würzburg Soviet Republic; Alsace–Lorraine Soviet Republic; Supported by: Russian SFSR; Revolutionaries [Socialdemocrats]: SPD (until 9 Nov. 1918); USPD (from 9 Nov. 1918); Spartacus League; KPD (from 30 Dec. 1918); IKD; Revolutionary Stewards; FVdG	1918: German Empire: Imperial Army; 1918–1919: Weimar Republic: Freikorps; Reichswehr; Der Stahlhelm; SPD	Defeat: Russian Bolsheviks did not reach Germany after the Soviet westward offensive of 1918–1919 and the intervention on Hungarian Revolution of 1919.; Victory of non-communists in Germany.
1918–1919	Soviet westward offensive of 1918–1919	Baltic region, East Slavic states, Southeast Europe and Central Europe	Russian SFSR Soviet Estonia Soviet Latvia Lithuanian-Byelorussian SSR Provisional Polish Revolutionary Committee Ukrainian SSR Finnish Red Guards	White Movement Estonia Latvia Lithuania Belarus Ukraine (Second Polish Republic) Poland Romania France United Kingdom Ober Ost Finnish, Danish, and Swedish volunteers	Stalemate: Soviet victory in Belarus and occupation of the Baltic states (start of Wars of Independence in Baltic States).; Soviet defeat in Romania and Finland.; Soviet inconclusive tie in Poland and Ukraine (start of the Polish–Soviet War and 2nd phase of the Ukrainian–Soviet War)
1918–1920	Latvian War of Independence	Latvia	Russian SFSR; Latvian SSR	Latvian Army; Estonia; (Russia) Lieven; Poland; Lithuania; Supported by the Allied Powers (German Empire) VI Reserve Corps: Baltische Landeswehr; Freikorps; merged into the West Russian Volunteer Army in September 1919	Defeat: Expulsion of Bolshevik forces from Latvia; Latvian independence
1918–1920	Estonian War of Independence	Estonia	Russian SFSR; Commune of Estonia	Estonia; Latvia; United Kingdom; (Russia) White Movement Finnish, Danish, and Swedish volunteers; Baltische Landeswehr	Defeat: Expulsion of Bolshevik forces from Estonia; Estonian independence; Treaty of Tartu
1918–1919	Lithuanian–Soviet War	Lithuania	Russian SFSR; Lithuanian–Belorussian SSR	Republic of Lithuania; Saxon volunteers	Defeat: Expulsion of Bolshevik forces from Lithuania; Lithuanian independence
1918–1920	Georgian-Ossetian Conflict	Georgia	Russian SFSR; Ossetian rebels	Transcaucasian Federation; Georgia	Defeat: The Ossetian rebellion is crushed
1918–1922	Siberian intervention	Siberia, Sakhalin and Northern China	Russian SFSR: Far Eastern Republic; Mongolian Communists Supported by: Provisional Government of the Republic of Korea	Russian State; Zelenyi Klyn; Allied Powers: Japan; Czechoslovakia; Poland; United States; Italy; United Kingdom: Canada; China; France; Mongolia	Victory: Bolshevik forces consolidate control over the Russian Far East.; Soviet–Japanese Basic Convention
1918–20	Revolutions and interventions in Hungary	Hungary, Slovakia, Romania and Croatia	Hungarian Republic (Hungarian Soviet Republic) Hungarian SR; Slovak SR Supported by: Soviet Russia	Kingdom of Hungary Czechoslovakia (Kingdom of Romania) Romania; State of Slovenes, Croats and Serbs; Kingdom of Serbs, Croats and Slovenes; Republic of Prekmurje; Hutsul Republic Supported by:France	Defeat: Victory of Counter-Revolutionaries in Hungary. Fall of Hungarian Soviet Republic; Victory of Anti-Hungarian separatists. Cordon sanitaire backed by France is stablished against Bolshevik Russia and Weimar Germany.
1918–19	Hungarian–Romanian War	Transylvania and Bessarabia	Kingdom of Hungary (13 November 1918 – 16 November 1918); Hungarian Republic (16 November 1918 – 21 March 1919); Soviet Hungary (from 21 March 1919); Supported by: Soviet Russia	Romania; Supported by: France	Defeat: Union of Bessarabia with Romania is consolidated; Union of Transylvania with Romania is consolidated.
1918–19	Hungarian–Czechoslovak War	Hungary–Slovakia border	Hungarian Republic (until 21 March 1919); Soviet Hungary (from 21 March 1919); Slovak SR; Supported by: Soviet Russia; Bessarabian SSR	Czechoslovakia Hungarian anti-communists Supported by: France; Romania	Defeat: Dissolution of the short-lived Slovak Soviet Republic
1919	Khotyn Uprising	Bessarabia	(Russian Empire) Committee for the Salvation of Bessarabia: (Ukrainian People's Republic) Ukrainian and Moldovan insurgents; Ukrainian SSR; Red Guard	Romania Ukraine	Defeat
1919	Bender Uprising	Bessarabia	Ukrainian SSR; Red Guard	Romania; France	Defeat
1919–1921	Polish–Soviet War	Poland, Vilnius, Western Belorussia and Ukraine	Russian SFSR; Ukrainian SSR; Byelorussian SSR; Polrewkom	Poland; Ukrainian nationalists; Belarusian nationalists; Latvia	Defeat: Bolshevik forces expelled from Poland; Peace of Riga; Destruction of the Ukrainian People's Republic
1919–1923	Turkish War of Independence	Turkey and Caucasus	Turkey; Russian SFSR	Greece; United Kingdom; Armenia	Victory: Overthrow of the Ottoman sultanate; Establishment of the Republic of Turkey
1920	Invasion of Azerbaijan	Azerbaijan	Russian SFSR; Azerbaijan SSR	Azerbaijan	Victory: Overthrow of the Azerbaijan Democratic Republic government; incorporation of Azerbaijan into the Soviet Union
1920	Invasion of Armenia	Armenia	Russian SFSR	Armenia	Victory: Overthrow of the First Republic of Armenia; incorporation of Armenia into the Soviet Union
1915–1921	Jungle Movement insurrection on Gilan: Anzali Operation	Iran	Persian SSR: Jungle revolutionaries; Supported by: Soviet Russia (since 1920)	Qajar Iran: Persian Cossack Brigade; Russian Empire (1915–1917): White movement (since 1920); British Empire	Defeat: Anglo-Soviet Trade Agreement forces the retreat of Bolsheviks and Soviet Caspian Flotilla from northern Iran.
1921	Invasion of Georgia	Georgia	Russian SFSR; Azerbaijan SSR; Turkey	Georgia	Victory: Overthrow of the Democratic Republic of Georgia; incorporation of Georgia into the Soviet Union
1921	Red army incursion on Altay	Xinjiang (Chinese Turkestan)	Russian SFSR; Mongolian People's Party; China	(Russia) White Movement: Orenburg Cossacks	Victory: Andrei Bakich anti-bolshevik resistance fled to Mongolia, starting Soviet intervention in Mongolia.
1921	Soviet intervention in Mongolia	Mongolia, Tuva and Northern China	Russian SFSR; Mongolian People's Party	Mongolia Supported by: (Russia) White Movement: Asiatic Cavalry Division; China: Anhui clique; Supported by: Japan	Victory: Mongolian Revolution of 1921 success in overthrown the Bogd Khan.; Provisional People's Republic of Mongolia established as a protectorate. End of the Chinese occupation of Mongolia.
1921	Free City Incident	Russian Far East	Russian SFSR: Far Eastern Republic; Korean Revolutionary Military Government Council: Irkutsk Faction (Korean Communist Party)	Provisional Government of the Republic of Korea: Shanghai Faction (Korean Communist Party)	Victory: Korean Independence Army is dismantled due to Japanese pression
1921	1921 Persian coup d'état	Iran	Jangalis Simko Kurdish rebels Colonel Pesian's forces Supported by: Russian SFSR	Qajar Iran Persian Cossack Brigade Supported by: United Kingdom	Defeat: Suppression of Colonel Pessian's revolt and dissolution of the Autonomous Government of Khorasan; Dissolution of the Republic of Gilan after Mirza Kuchik Khan lost support from Vladimir Lenin.; Russo-Persian Treaty of Friendship (1921); White Russian counter-revolutionary forces who fled to Iran, along Communist Party of Persia, are repressed by Persian Monarchy
1921–1922	East Karelian Uprising	East Karelia	Russian SFSR	Forest Guerrillas; (Finland) Finnish volunteers	Victory: The uprising is crushed

== Russia and the Soviet Union (1916–1934) ==
Date	Conflict	Location	Russia and its allies	Opponent(s)	Result
1916–1934	Central Asian Revolt	Russian Turkestan	Russian Republic (1917): Russian SFSR; Turkestan ASSR; Kirghiz ASSR; Khorezm PSR; Bukharan PSR; Soviet Union (from 30 December 1922); In cooperation with: (Kingdom of Afghanistan) Amanullah loyalists (1929); Afghanistan (1930)	Basmachi movement; Khanate of Khiva (1918–20); (Russia) White Army; Alash Autonomy (1919–20); Emirate of Bukhara (1920); Supported by: Afghanistan (until mid-1922); (Emirate of Afghanistan (1929)) Saqqawists (1929); Emirate of Afghanistan (1929)	Soviet-Afghan victory: Turkestan incorporated into the Soviet Union

== Soviet Union (1922–1991) ==
Date	Conflict	Location	Combatant 1	Combatant 2	Result
1916–1934	Central Asian Revolt	Central Asia	Russian Empire (until 1917) Russian SFSR: Turkestan ASSR; Kirghiz ASSR; Soviet Union (from 1922)	Basmachi Khiva; Bukhara; Afghanistan	Victory: The revolt is suppressed
1924	August Uprising		Soviet Union	Damkom	Victory: The uprising is suppressed; Consolidation of Soviet rule in the Georgian SSR
1925–1926	Urtatagai conflict		Soviet Union	Emirate of Afghanistan	Defeat: Peace Treaty; Urtatagui is seized back to Afghanistan; Afghanistan agreement to restrain Basmachi border raids
1929	Sino-Soviet conflict		Soviet Union	China	Victory: The provisions of the 1924 agreement are upheld
1929	Red Army intervention in Afghanistan (1929); Part of the Afghan Civil War (1928–1929)		Soviet Union; Kingdom of Afghanistan	Emirate of Afghanistan; Saqqawists; Basmachi	Defeat: The Soviet Union failed to change the situation in the country; Red Army withdrawal from Afghanistan back to the USSR; Civil war in Afghanistan continues
1930	Red Army intervention in Afghanistan (1930)		Soviet Union	Basmachi	Victory
1932	Chechen uprising of 1932		Soviet Union	Chechen rebels	Victory: The uprising is suppressed
1932–1941	Soviet–Japanese border conflicts		Soviet Union; Mongolia	Japan; Manchukuo	Victory: Soviet–Japanese Neutrality Pact
1934	Soviet invasion of Xinjiang		Soviet Union; Xinjiang clique (Russian Empire) White Movement; Torgut Mongols	China	Stalemate: Xinjiang divided in two
1936–1939	Spanish Civil War	Spain	Spain: People's Army; Popular Front; UGT; CNT-FAI; Generalitat de Catalunya; Euzko Gudarostea; Supported by: Soviet Union; Mexico Volunteers International Brigades	Nationalist faction: FET y de las JONS (Note: The only party under Francisco Franco from 1937 onward, a merger of the other factions on the Nationalist side.); FE de las JONS (Note: 1936–1937, then merged into FET y de las JONS); Requetés/CT; CEDA; Renovación Española; Army of Africa; Supported by: (Kingdom of Italy) Italy (Nazi Germany) Germany; Portugal	Defeat: Nationalist faction victory; Fall of the Second Spanish Republic; Beginning of Franco's regime
1937	Islamic Rebellion in Xinjiang		Xinjiang Soviet Union (Russian Empire) White Movement	China	Victory: Rebellion is suppressed; Establishment of the rule of Sheng Shicai's Soviet puppet regime over the whole territory of Xinjiang province
1939	Soviet invasion of Poland (Part of World War II)		Germany Soviet Union; Slovakia	Poland	Victory: Occupation of Polish territory by Nazi Germany, Soviet Union and Slovakia; Annexation of Soviet-occupied territory into the Byelorussian SSR and the Ukrainian SSR (except for part of the Vilnius Region)
1939–1940	Winter War (Part of World War II)		Soviet Union	Finland	Inconclusive: Soviet invasion of Finland repelled and the planned conquest of Finland fails; Moscow Peace Treaty; Cession of the Gulf of Finland islands, Karelian Isthmus, Ladoga Karelia, Salla, and Rybachy Peninsula, and lease of Hanko to the Soviet Union; Expulsion of the Soviet Union from the League of Nations
1940	Occupation and annexation of the Baltic states (Part of World War II)		Soviet Union	Estonia; Latvia; Lithuania	Victory: Occupation and annexation of the Baltic states into the Soviet Union
1940	Soviet occupation of Bessarabia and Northern Bukovina (part of World War II)		Soviet Union	Romania	Victory: Bessarabia, Northern Bukovina and the Hertsa region annexed into the Soviet Union; formation of the Moldavian SSR
1941–1945	World War II		Allied Powers: Soviet Union; United States; United Kingdom; China; France; Poland; Canada; Australia; New Zealand; India; South Africa (Kingdom of Yugoslavia) (Democratic Federal Yugoslavia) Yugoslavia; Greece; Denmark; Norway; Netherlands; Belgium; Luxembourg; Czechoslovakia; Brazil; Mexico	Axis powers: Germany; Japan; Italy; Hungary; Romania; Bulgaria; Slovakia; Croatia; Thailand; Manchukuo; Mengjiang; Wang Jingwei regime	Victory: Debellation of the Third Reich; Fall of Japanese and Italian Empires; Creation of the United Nations; Emergence of the United States and the Soviet Union as rival superpowers; Beginning of the Cold War
1944–1960s	Anti-communist insurgencies in Central and Eastern Europe: Anti-communist resistance in Poland (1944–1953); Guerrilla war in Ukraine (Part of World War II from 1944 to 1945); Guerrilla war in the Baltic states; Hungarian Revolution of 1956; Uprising of 1953 in East Germany		Soviet Union; East Germany; Polish People's Republic; Czechoslovak Socialist Republic; Hungarian People's Republic; Socialist Republic of Romania; People's Republic of Bulgaria; Socialist Federal Republic of Yugoslavia	Ukrainian insurgents Polish insurgents (Estonia) Estonian insurgents (Latvia) Latvian insurgents (Lithuania) Lithuanian insurgents (Bulgaria) Bulgarian insurgents Serbian insurgents Croatian insurgents Romanian insurgents (Germany) German insurgents Hungarian insurgents	Victory: The insurgencies are suppressed; Soviet hegemony in Eastern Europe preserved
1945	Soviet–Japanese War (Part of World War II)		Soviet Union; Mongolia	Japan; Manchukuo	Victory: Karafuto Prefecture annexed into the Soviet Union and incorporated into the Sakhalin Oblast of the Russian SFSR; The Kuril Islands annexed into the Soviet Union and incorporated into the Russian SFSR; The liberation of Manchuria, Inner Mongolia, and northern Korea, and the collapse of the Japanese puppet states therein; The partition of the Korean Peninsula; the Soviet Union occupies North Korea; Manchuria and Inner Mongolia returned to China
1946–1954	First Indochina War		France; State of Vietnam; Kingdom of Laos; Cambodia	Viet Minh; Khmer Issarak; Pathet Lao; Japan Japanese holdout Supported by: Soviet Union; China	Victory: Withdrawal of French forces from Indochina; Democratic Republic of Vietnam independence recognized; State of Vietnam, Kingdom of Laos and Kingdom of Cambodia achieve independence; Vietnam was partitioned between North (controlled by the Việt Minh) and South (controlled by the State of Vietnam)
1950–1953	Korean War		North Korea China; Soviet Union	United Nations South Korea; United States; United Kingdom; Australia; Belgium; Canada; France; Philippines; Colombia; Ethiopia; Greece; Luxembourg; Netherlands; New Zealand; South Africa; Thailand; Turkey	Ceasefire: Establishment of the Korean DMZ; Minor territorial changes
1955–1975	Vietnam War		North Vietnam; Viet Cong and PRG; Pathet Lao; GRUNK (1970–1975); Khmer Rouge; China; Soviet Union; North Korea	South Vietnam; United States; South Korea; Australia; New Zealand; Laos; Cambodia (1967–1970); Khmer Republic (1970–1975); Thailand; Philippines	Victory: Withdrawal of American forces from Indochina; North Vietnamese victory over South Vietnam; Dissolution of the Republic of Vietnam; South Vietnam annexed by North Vietnam; Soviet-aligned communist governments take power in South Vietnam, Laos and Cambodia
1968	Invasion of Czechoslovakia		Soviet Union; Bulgaria; East Germany; Hungary; Poland	Czechoslovakia	Victory: The Prague Spring is suppressed; Moscow Protocol; Soviet military presence in Czechoslovakia until 1991
1969	Sino-Soviet border conflict		Soviet Union	China	Victory (status quo ante bellum): Tactical Soviet victory; Strategic Soviet victory: ceasefire agreement signed; 1991 Sino-Soviet Border Agreement
1967–1970	War of Attrition		Egypt; Soviet Union; Kuwait; PLO; Jordan; Syria; Cuba	Israel	Inconclusive
1975–1991	Angolan Civil War		MPLA; Cuba; Soviet Union; SWAPO; MK	South Africa; UNITA; FNLA; FLEC	Victory: Three Powers Accord; Withdrawal of all foreign forces from Angola; Independence of Namibia
1977–1978	Ethio-Somali War		Ethiopia; Cuba; South Yemen; Soviet Union	Somalia; WSLF	Victory: Somalia breaks all ties with the Soviet Bloc
1979–1989	Soviet–Afghan War		Soviet Union; Democratic Republic of Afghanistan	Afghan Mujahideen	Defeat: Failure to suppress the Afghan mujahideen insurgency; Geneva Accords of 1988; Soviet withdrawal from Afghanistan; Beginning of the Afghan Civil War

== Russian Federation (1991–present) ==
Date	Conflict	Location	Russia and its allies	Opponent(s)	Result for Russia
1991–1993	Georgian Civil War	Georgia (mainly in Tbilisi and Western Georgia)	(Georgia (country)) Pro-Shevardnadze forces: 22 December 1991 – 6 January 1992 (Georgia (country)) Rebel factions of the National Guard Mkhedrioni Tetri Artsivi Merab Kostava Society Union of Afghans; 2 January 1992 – 10 March 1992 (Georgia (country)) Military Council; Interim Government; 10 March 1992 – October 1992 (Georgia (country)) State Council; Interim Government; October 1992 – 31 December 1993 (Georgia (country)) Government of Georgia; Georgian Armed Forces; Internal Troops of Georgia; National Guard of Georgia; Supported by: Russia	(Georgia (country)) Pro-Gamsakhurdia forces: 22 December 1991 – 6 January 1992 (Georgia (country)) Government of Georgia; National Guard of Georgia 6 January 1992 – March 1992 (Georgia (country)) National Disobedience Committee March 1992 – September 1993 (Georgia (country)) Gamsakhurdia's government-in-exile; Partisans; Units of the National Guard 2 September 1993 – 6 November 1993 (Georgia (country)) Zugdidi-based government 6 November 1993 – 31 December 1993 (Georgia (country)) Partisans; Supported by: Chechen Republic of Ichkeria	Pro-Shevardnadzist victory: Exile and death of the first President of Georgia, Zviad Gamsakhurdia; Georgia joins the Commonwealth of Independent States
1991–1992	South Ossetian War	Tskhinvali Region, Georgia	South Ossetia; Russia (1992)	Georgia	South Ossetian victory, see aftermath: Division of South Ossetia into zones controlled by Georgians and Ossetians
1992–1993 (Note: Ceasefire agreement was signed on 1 December 1993, although fighting continued during 1994.)	War in Abkhazia	Abkhazia, Western Georgia	Abkhazia; Confederation of Mountain Peoples of the Caucasus; Supported by: Russia (Note: See Russia's role in the conflict section for more details)	Georgia	Russian and Abkhaz victory: Ethnic cleansing of Georgians in Abkhazia; Abkhazia becomes a de-facto independent republic
1990–1992	Transnistria War	Transnistria, Moldova	Transnistria; Russia; Supported by: Ukraine	/Moldova (Note: Soviet Socialist Republic of Moldova until 23 May 1991. Constituent republic of the Soviet Union until 27 August 1991.) Supported by: Romania	Russian–Transnistrian victory: Transnistria is a de facto independent state, but remains internationally recognized as part of Moldova
1992–1997	Tajikistani Civil War	Tajikistan	/Tajikistan; Popular Front of Tajikistan; Communist Party of Tajikistan; Socialist Party of Tajikistan; /Russia; Uzbekistan /Kazakhstan /Kyrgyzstan Supported by: Belarus (weapons supplies); UNMOT; Austria; Bangladesh; Bulgaria; Czech Republic; Denmark; Ghana; Hungary; Indonesia; Jordan; Nepal; Nigeria; Poland; Switzerland; Ukraine; Uruguay	United Tajik Opposition; Islamic Renaissance Party; Tajik Democratic Party; Party of People's Unity; Rastokhez Popular Movement; Lali Badakhshan; Afghanistan (until 1996); Jamiat-e Islami (until 1996); Supported by: Al-Qaeda; (al-Qaeda) Islamic Movement of Uzbekistan; Taliban; Iran (alleged, denied by Iran)	Armistice
1994–1996	First Chechen War	Chechnya and parts of Ingushetia, Stavropol Krai and Dagestan	Russia: Loyalist opposition	Chechen Republic of Ichkeria; Chechen Mujahideen	Defeat: Chechen Republic of Ichkeria becomes an independent state
1999	War of Dagestan	Dagestan, Russia	Russia: Armed Forces; Army; Navy; Air Force; VDV; Spetsnaz GRU; FSB; MVD; Militsiya; Internal Troops; OMON; Dagestan; (Dagestan) Dagestani police and local militia	Islamic Djamaat of Dagestan: CPID; Chechnya: IIPB; SPIR; Religious Police	Russian victory
1999–2009	Second Chechen War	North Caucasus, mainly Chechnya, Dagestan and Ingushetia; Spillovers in Georgia, North Ossetia, Kabardino-Balkaria, and Karachay-Cherkessia; Suicide attacks in Russia	Russia: Provisional Council (until 2000); Chechen Republic (from 2000)	Chechen Republic of Ichkeria (1999–2007): Caucasian Front (2005–2007); Caucasus Emirate (2007–2009): North Caucasian volunteers; Mujahideen Grey Wolves	Russian victory: Fall and exile of the Chechen Republic of Ichkeria; Establishment of the Chechen Republic; Beginning of the insurgency in the North Caucasus; Chechnya reincorporated into Russia
2008	Russo-Georgian War	Georgia	Russia: South Ossetia (Note: South Ossetia's status is disputed. It considers itself to be an independent state, but this is recognised by only a few other countries. The Georgian government and most of the world's other states consider South Ossetia de jure a part of Georgia's territory.); Abkhazia (Note: The political status of Abkhazia is disputed. Having unilaterally declared independence from Georgia in 1992, Abkhazia is formally recognised as an independent state by 4 UN member states (three other states previously recognised it but then withdrew their recognition), while the remainder of the international community recognizes it as de jure Georgian territory. Georgia continues to claim the area as its own territory, designating it as Russian-occupied territory.)	Georgia	Russian, South Ossetian and Abkhaz victory: Ethnic cleansing of Georgians from South Ossetia and the Kodori Gorge in Abkhazia; Recognition of South Ossetia and Abkhazia by Russia; Russian military bases established in Abkhazia and South Ossetia; Severance of Georgia–Russia relations; Georgia loses control of Kodori Valley in Abkhazia, as well as Akhalgori Municipality and parts of the Tskhinvali District in South Ossetia.
2009–2017	Insurgency in the North Caucasus	North Caucasian Federal District	Russia List: * Astrakhan Oblast; Bashkortostan; Chechnya; Dagestan; Ingushetia; Kabardino-Balkaria; Karachay-Cherkessia; Moscow; North Ossetia–Alania; Novgorod Oblast; Saint Petersburg; Stavropol Krai; Volgograd Oblast; (Chechnya) Kadyrovtsy; Other loyalists	Caucasus Emirate (2009–16) List: * Vilayat Dagestan; Riyad-us Saliheen Brigade; Turkish Mujahideen; Vilayat Iriston (2009); Arab Mujahideen (2009–12); Vilayat KBK (2009–15); Vilayat Nokhchicho (2009-15); Vilayat Galgayche (2009-2015); Al-Qaeda; Imam Shamil Battalion (2017-2019); Islamic State; Islamic State – Caucasus Province	Russian Victory: The Caucasus Emirate is dissolved, but the conflict evolves into an Islamic State insurgency.
2014–present	Russo-Ukrainian War	Ukraine, Russia, and Black Sea (spillover into Romania, Poland, Moldova, and Belarus)	Russia; Donetsk PR (Note: The Donetsk People's Republic and the Luhansk People's Republic were Russian puppet states that declared their independence from Ukraine in May 2014. In 2022, they received international recognition from each other, Russia, Syria and North Korea, and some other partially recognised states. On 30 September 2022, Russia declared that it had formally annexed both entities. They continue to exist as republics of Russia.); Luhansk PR; North Korea; Belarus (Note: In 2022, Belarus allowed Russia to use its territory to launch the invasion and to launch missiles into Ukraine.); Supplied by: For details, see Russian military suppliers	Ukraine; Supplied by: For details, see military aid to Ukraine	Ongoing: Russian annexation of Crimea and parts of four southeast Ukrainian oblasts in 2014 and 2022, respectively; Russian occupation of more than 18% of Ukrainian territory as of March 2024; Ukrainian occupation of parts of Russia's Kursk Oblast since 2024
2015–present	Islamic State insurgency in the North Caucasus	North Caucasus (with spillover in other Russian territories), northern Azerbaijan and Georgia	Russia; Chechnya; Dagestan; Ingushetia; Kabardino-Balkaria; Kalmykia; Karachay-Cherkessia; North Ossetia–Alania; Adygea; Krasnodar Krai; Rostov Oblast; Stavropol Krai; Volgograd Oblast; Moscow Oblast; Moscow; Nizhny Novgorod Oblast; Bashkortostan; Azerbaijan; Qusar District; Georgia; Adjara; Tbilisi	Islamic State: (no border) Caucasus Province; (no border) Khorasan Province; (no border) Azerbaijan Province; al-Qaeda: Imam Shamil Battalion (2017-2019); (no border) Other Islamist groups and lone wolves	Ongoing as a hit-and-run campaign
2015–2024	Russian military intervention in the Syrian Civil War	Syria	Russia; Iran; Syrian Arab Republic; Humanitarian support: Armenia Syrian Democratic Forces (2016–2017)	Syrian opposition: Syrian Salvation Government; Tahrir al-Sham (2017–2025); (Syrian opposition) Syrian Interim Government; (Syrian opposition) Free Syrian Army; (Syrian opposition) Syrian National Army; Supported by: Turkey Qatar Ukraine United States (2015–2017); Syrian Democratic Forces (2017–present) Islamic State Al-Qaeda: Al-Nusra Front (2013–2016); Jabhat Fath al-Sham (2016–2017); Jund al-Aqsa (2017–2018); Guardians of Religion (2018–2025)	Syrian opposition victory: Russian forces fail to prevent the fall of the Assad regime; Russian forces begin withdrawal after the 2024 opposition offensives; Continued Russian presence at Khmeimim Air Base; Islamic State loses all territory in Syria
2018–present	Central African Republic Civil War	Central African Republic (with possible spillover into East Region, Cameroon, Democratic Republic of the Congo, and South Sudan)	Central African Republic; Central African Armed Forces; MINUSCA; EUTM-RCA Rwanda (since 2020); Russia (since 2018); Wagner Group; Russian Imperial Movement; Black Russians; Azande Ani Kpi Gbe; Formerly: France (2013–2021)	Coalition of Patriots for Change (since 2020): Anti-balaka; FPRC; MPC elements (Note: Despite Mahamat al-Khatim's November 2023 announcement to leave CPC, some members of the group chose to stay in the coalition.); MPC; PRNC; CMSPR (since 2024) Support: Chad (alleged); RSF; Defunct groups: RJ (until 2018); MNLC (until–2019); MLCJ (until 2022); RPRC (until 2022); UPC (until 2025); 3R (until 2025)	Ongoing: Fighting between Ex-Séléka factions FPRC and UPC.; Ex-president Bozizé merges all rebel groups and forms the Coalition of Patriots for Change.; Elections in 2021 with Touadéra being re-elected as president.; As of July 2021 the government controls more territory than at any point since the war began.
2021–present	Mali War	Mali	Russia; Mali	Al-Qaeda; Islamic State	Ongoing
2024–present	Jihadist insurgency in Burkina Faso	Burkina Faso	Burkina Faso: Armed Forces; Volunteers for the Defense of the Homeland; Koglweogos (civilian militias); Russia (since 2024): Wagner Group; Supported by: Mali; United States	Al-Qaeda; JNIM; Ansar ul Islam; Islamic State; Sahel Province	Ongoing: Around 40% of the country controlled by Jihadist forces

== See also ==
- Armed Forces of the Russian Federation – Military forces of the Russian Federation
- History of Russia
- Military history of Russia
- List of wars – Overview of and topical guide to war (Category:Lists of wars)
- List of wars between Russia and Sweden
- List of wars involving Armenia
- List of wars involving Azerbaijan
- List of wars involving Belarus
- List of wars involving Estonia
- List of wars involving Finland
- List of wars and battles involving Galicia–Volhynia
- List of wars involving Georgia (country)
- List of wars involving Kazakhstan
- List of wars involving Kyrgyzstan
- List of wars involving Latvia
- List of wars involving Lithuania
- List of wars involving Moldova
- List of wars involving the Novgorod Republic
- List of wars involving Poland
  - List of armed conflicts involving Poland against Russia
- List of wars involving Tajikistan
- List of wars involving Turkey
- List of wars involving Ukraine
- List of wars involving Uzbekistan
- Russo-Turkish wars
- Russo-Persian Wars
- Russo-Caucasian conflict
- Chechen–Russian conflict
- Post-Soviet conflicts

== Sources ==
- Terentyev, M. (2022). История завоевания Средней Азии [The history of the conquest of Central Asia] (in Russian). Volume 1. ISBN 978-5-4481-1327-7.
- Виталий, Пенской (2020). Ливонская война: Забытые победы Ивана Грозного 1558-1561 гг. Moscow: Москва. ISBN 978-5-00155-260-4.
- Гумилев, Лев (2023). От Руси к России. Moscow: Москва. ISBN 978-5-17-153845-3.
- Alef, Gustave (1983). "The Battle of Suzdal' in 1445. An Episode in the Muscovite War of Succession (1978)". Rulers and nobles in fifteenth century Muscovy. Part II. London: Variorum Reprints. pp. 11–20. ISBN 9780860781202. (first published in Forschungen zur osteuropäischen Geschichte 25 (1978) Berlin.)
- Halperin, Charles J. (1987). Russia and the Golden Horde: The Mongol Impact on Medieval Russian History. Indiana University. p. 222. ISBN 9781850430575. (e-book).
- Katchanovski, Ivan; Kohut, Zenon E.; Nesebio, Bohdan Y.; Yurkevich, Myroslav (2013). Historical Dictionary of Ukraine. Lanham, Maryland; Toronto; Plymouth: Scarecrow Press. p. 992. ISBN 9780810878471.
- Kohn, George Childs (2013). Dictionary of Wars. Revised Edition. Londen/New York: Routledge. ISBN 9781135954949.
- Logan, F. Donald (2005). The Vikings in History. New York: Routledge (Taylor & Francis). p. 205. ISBN 9780415327565. Archived from the original on 23 April 2023. (third edition)
- Martin, Janet (1995). Medieval Russia: 980–1584. New York: Cambridge University Press. ISBN 0521362768.
- Martin, Janet (2007). Medieval Russia: 980–1584 (E-book) (Second ed.). Cambridge: Cambridge University Press. ISBN 978-0-511-36800-4.
- Martin, Janet (2009b). "From Kiev to Muscovy: The Beginnings to 1450". In Freeze, Gregory (ed.). Russia: A History. Oxford: Oxford University Press. pp. 1–30. ISBN 978-0-19-150121-0. Archived from the original on 27 January 2023. (third edition)
- Ostrowski, Donald (1993). "Why did the Metropolitan Move from Kiev to Vladimir in the Thirteenth Century". Christianity and the Eastern Slavs. Volume I: Slavic Cultures in the Middle Ages. Berkeley: University of California Press. pp. 83–101. ISBN 9780520360198. doi:10.1525/9780520313606-009
- Shaikhutdinov, Marat (23 November 2021). "3.4 Invasion of Tokhtamysh". Between East and West: The Formation of the Moscow State. Academic Studies Press. pp. 104–107. ISBN 9781644697153.
