= Kazakh–Dzungar War (1739–1741) =

Part of the Kazakh-Dzungar Wars

- Part of the Kazakh–Dzungar Wars
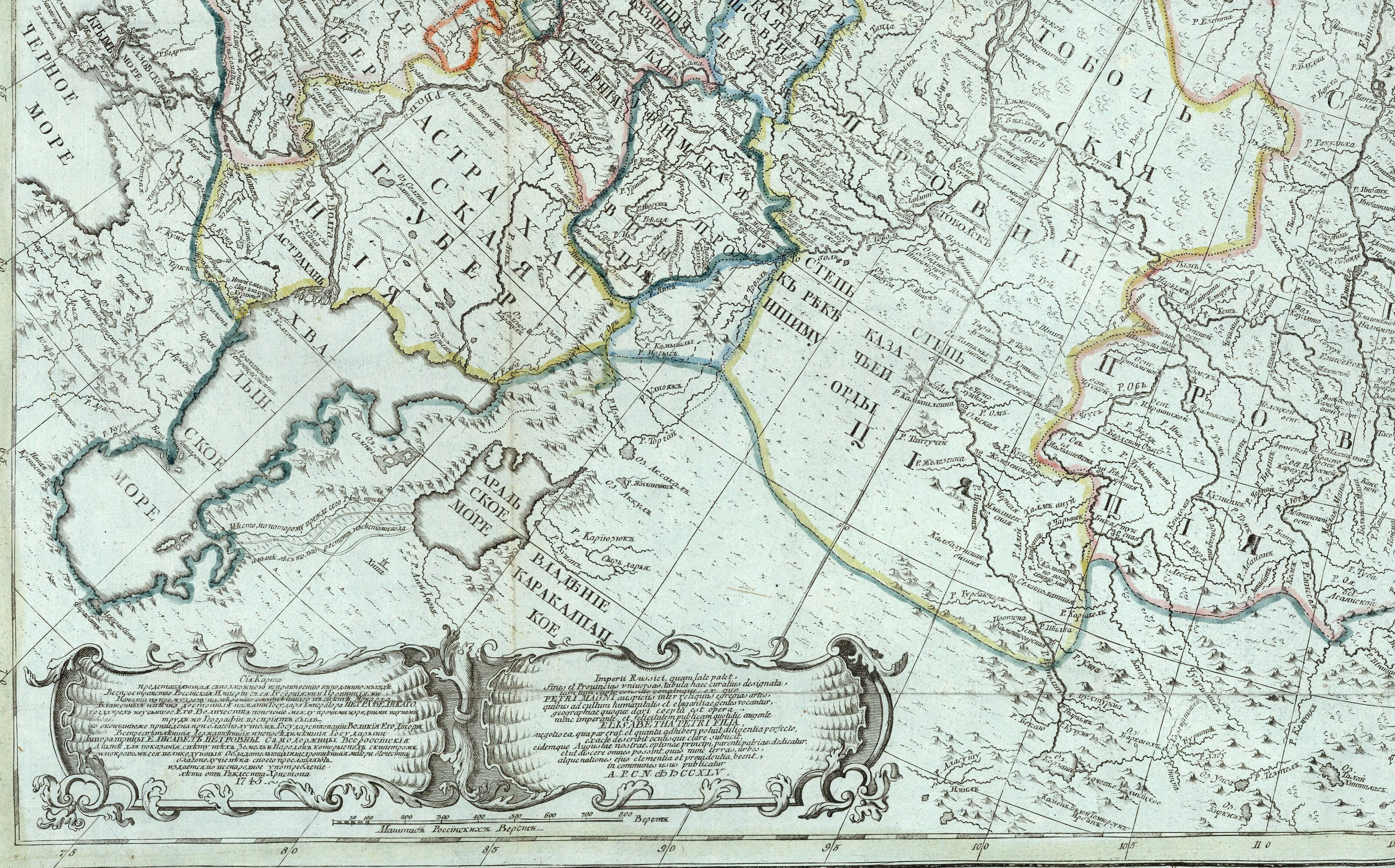
- Fragment of the map of the Russian Empire (1745), showing the territories of the Kazakh Jüzes.
Date	1739–1741
Location	Ishim, Syr Darya, Tobol, Yaik Kazakhstan
Result	Dzungar victory

Belligerents
Kazakh Khanate: (Kazakh Khanate) Middle jüz; (Kazakh Khanate) Junior jüz; Supported by: (Russian Empire) Orenburg government (Bashkortostan) Bashkir rebels	Dzungar Khanate

Commanders and leaders
(Kazakh Khanate) Abilmambet Khan (Kazakh Khanate) Ablai Sultan (POW) (Kazakh Khanate) Bogenbay Batyr (Kazakh Khanate) Oljabay Batyr (Kazakh Khanate) Abul Khair Khan (Bashkortostan) Karasakal (Russian Empire) Ivan Neplyuyev (Russian Empire) Karl Miller (Russian Empire) Vasily Urusov	(Dzungar Khanate) Galdan Tseren (Dzungar Khanate) Lama Dorji (Dzungar Khanate) Septen Noion (Dzungar Khanate) Tseren-Donduba (Dzungar Khanate) Sary-Manji

Strength
	1739: 24,000; 1740: 30,000-35,000; 1741: 30,000

Casualties and losses
(Kazakh Khanate) Significant	

The Kazakh–Dzungar War of 1739–1741 was the penultimate one major Dzungar invasion of the Kazakh Khanate, escalating a century-long rivalry into an existential "total war." Triggered by Dzungar dynastic instability and the emergence of political pretenders, the campaign aimed to subjugate the Middle jüz and isolate it from Russian influence. A strategic stalemate eventually shifted the conflict toward multi-lateral diplomacy involving the Russian Empire. The war effectively halted Dzungar eastward expansion and reshaped the political landscape of the Great Steppe.

Following the war, the Khan of the Middle jüz, Abulmambet, and the Sultans Ablai, Abulfeiz, and Niyaz were also forced to send hostages to Dzungaria. Russian Lieutenant D. Gladyshev, who returned from a visit to Abulkhair in Orenburg in the spring of 1742, reported on a meeting of the nobility of the Little jüz, at which a decision was made to recognize the allegiance of the Dzungar khuntaiji. Soon after, the Khan of the Little Zhuz, Abulkhair, also sent his son to Dzungaria.

In 1743, through a delegation sent by Abilmambet Khan, both sides reached an agreement and established peace; this treaty remained in effect until the death of Galdan Tseren in 1745, marking the beginning of a new phase in regional power dynamics.

== Background ==
The geopolitical landscape of the late 1730s was defined by a significant shift in the Dzungar Khanate's foreign policy. Following the death of the Yongzheng Emperor in 1735, Galdan Tseren concluded a peace treaty with the Qing dynasty, which secured his eastern frontiers and allowed for a massive military redirection toward the Kazakh Khanate. By the summer of 1735, Dzungar forces had already re-established dominance over the Senior jüz and key southern urban centers, including Tashkent and Turkestan. Furthermore, Galdan Tseren attempted to introduce Lamaism among the local Muslim population, though this effort ultimately failed.

During 1737–1738, the Dzungars engaged in complex diplomatic maneuvers; while Galdan Tseren sent envoys to Abul Khair Khan promising "friendship," he was simultaneously massing an invasion force of 20,000 to 24,000 troops along the Irtysh and Karasu lines. He justified the impending assault to Russian authorities as "just revenge" for Kazakh raids on Dzungar cattle and territory. Despite the growing threat, the Kazakh Khan remained profoundly fragmented. The Middle Jüz and Junior Jüz were preoccupied with internal power struggles and external conflicts. This lack of strategic unity left the Kazakh borders vulnerable when the Dzungar offensive finally commenced in the spring of 1739.

== First Campaign ==
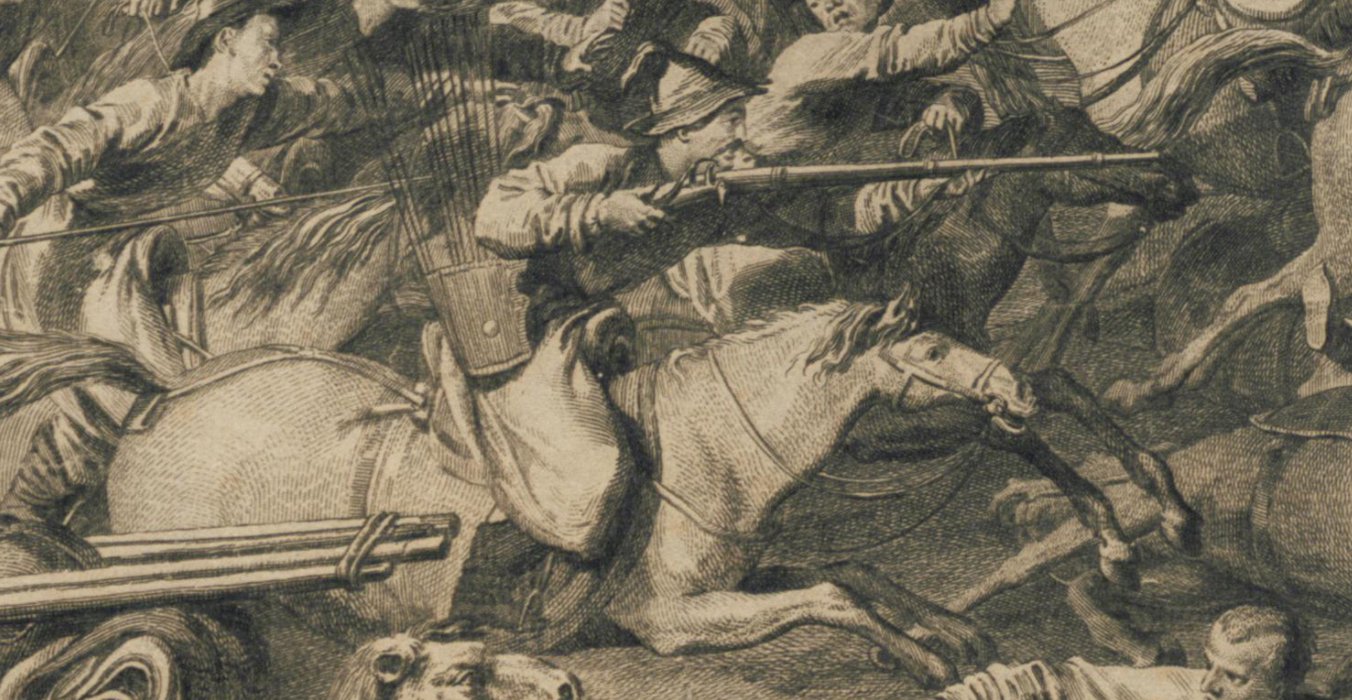
Dzungar cavalry.

In the spring of 1739, Dzungar troops numbering 24 thousand men under the command of Tseren- Dondoba invaded the territory of the Middle Jüz in two strike columns. According to the Orenburg Commissar Bashkir Urusov, who escaped from Kazakh

“ Kontaishin Khan Galdan-Chirin, together with the Kalmyks, gathered a large army of 24 thousand men, divided it into 5 Kyrgyz-Kaysak divisions:Kanzygalinskaya, Karagulskaya, Yatamanlimaiskaya, Uvatskaya, Kerenskaya and drove away 50,000 sheep.”

Quite numerous detachments from the Dzungar army located along the southern part of the Irtysh line, under the command of Noion Septen began to carry out separate raids on the nomadic camps of the Middle Jüz with the aim of robbery and clarification of the situation.

== Second Campaign ==
In the winter of 1739–1740, the Dzungars resumed their offensives into Kazakh territories. The Dzungar army, totaling between 30,000 and 35,000 troops, was divided into two main groups: the first group, led by Septen, advanced towards Saryarka and the Ishim, while the second group, under the command of Sary-Manji, moved towards the Syr Darya and Jetisu. The strategic goal of these Dzungar commanders was to cut off the Kazakhs from the south across the Syr Darya and from the Russian fortified lines to the north. The tribes of the Middle Jüz along the Tobol and Ishim rivers suffered significant losses. According to the plan of Dzungarian Noions, the Kazakhs were to be sige in a semicircle and surrendered, but a harsh winter put an end to this plan against Middle Jüz On January 25, 1740, the Kazan provincial chancery reported to the senate office in Moscow. In January 1740, a force of approximately 15,000 Dzungar troops launched an offensive against the Kazakh nomadic tribes of Uaq and Kerei tribes, also Abulmamet, and Barak Sultan along the Irtysh and Ishim rivers. Facing a superior force, the Kazakh tribes were compelled to abandon their livestock and possessions, retreating toward the Yaik River before eventually resettling near the Syr Darya. Difficult natural conditions, a lack of sufficient horses, and the uncertainty of the Russian government's intentions forced the Dzungar commanders to withdraw its troops from Kazakhstan and deploy them along the Irtysh. Since the Kazakh side suffered significant losses, in order to compensate for the losses.

== Russian diplomatic involvement ==
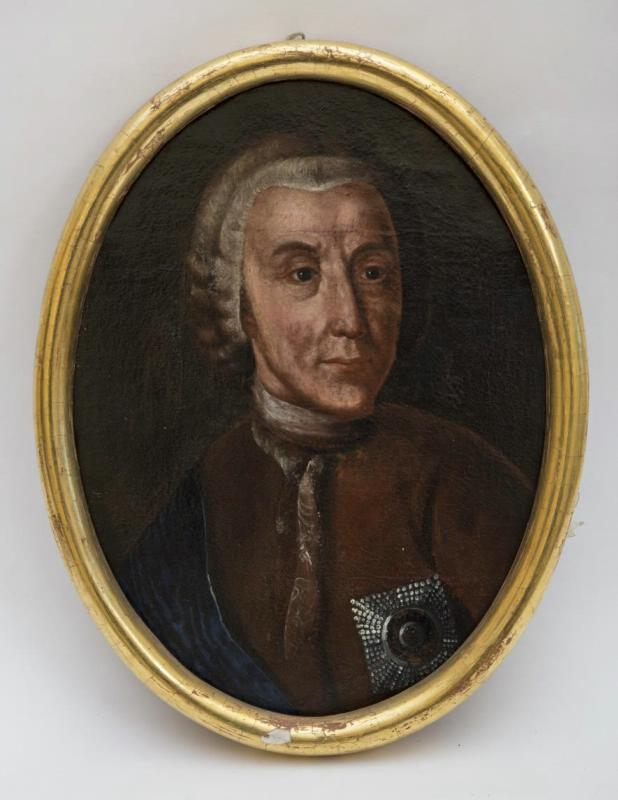
Ivan Ivanovich Neplyuev, Governor of Orenburg Province

Following the devastating Dzungar campaigns of 1739, the leadership of the Middle Zhuz, headed by Abilmambet Khan and Ablai Sultan, adopted a dual-track policy to ensure the state's integrity in the face of Dzungar aggression. On August 28, 1740, the Kazakh elite arrived at the Or River in Orsk (Note: the initial site of Orenburg) for a pivotal meeting with Prince Vasily Urusov, the head of the Orenburg Commission. During these negotiations, they formally accepted the protectorate of the Russian Empire and reaffirmed their oath of allegiance to Empress Anna Ioannovna. This strategic move was intended to leverage Russian diplomatic weight against the Dzungars. According to historian Vasily Bartold, such protectorates were often viewed by Central Asian rulers as a "beneficial deal," providing the prestige and nominal protection of a stronger power without imposing actual subordinative obligations.

In response to Kazakh requests, the Russian administration issued formal decrees (ukaz) and diplomatic notes to the Dzungar headquarters, demanding an end to their incursions into Kazakh territories. However, the intervention remained largely symbolic. The Russian Empire was highly reluctant to provide direct military support, preferring to maintain a buffer zone without committing regular troops to a full-scale war with the Dzungar Khanate. This strategy of "paper protection" failed to deter the Dzungars. The diplomatic deadlock was further exacerbated by Russia's simultaneous demands for the extradition of Bashkir refugees hiding in the Kazakh Steppe. Russia's refusal to provide tangible military aid, coupled with their internal security priorities regarding the Bashkir rebels, ultimately proved ineffective in preventing the massive Dzungar offensive of 1741.

== Bashkir Intervention ==
=== Origin ===
The Bashkir rebel Karasakal, identified as Mendykhul Yulaev in Bashkir sources, also used the names Nogai Sultan-Kerei and Karakalpak Sultan Baibolat. By claiming to be the Dzungar prince Shuno-Lozan, (Note: also known as Shuno-Dabo) he provided Galdan Tseren with a pretext to intervene in the region, leading to the escalation of the Kazakh–Dzungar War. Shuno Dabo had fled to the Volga in 1727 and died in exile in 1732, but Karasakal utilized his identity for political purposes.

=== Political destabilization ===
Kazakh authorities, including Abilmambet Khan, Kabanbai Batyr, Kazbek Bi, and Ablai Sultan, refused to extradite Karasakal, viewing him as an asset to incite internal strife within the Dzungar Khanate. Karasakal portrayed himself as the legitimate rival to Galdan Tseren and, supported by Oirat dissidents such as Taisha Barghai, conducted raids on Dzungar borderlands.

Despite pressure from the Russian Empire and the Dzungar Khanate, the Kazakh leadership provided Karasakal with livestock and protection. They aimed to use him to destabilize the Dzungar state by potentially installing him on the Oirat throne.

In 1742–1743, Galdan Tseren demanded Karasakal's extradition in exchange for the release of Ablai Sultan and other captives. Despite a Russian reward for his capture, no Kazakh ruler complied. Karasakal's influence led to a conflict with Sultan Barak in 1744, after the latter attempted to capture him to secure his own son's release. Karasakal avoided the trap and fled to the protection of Kazybek Bi and Kabanbay Batyr.

== Third Campaign ==
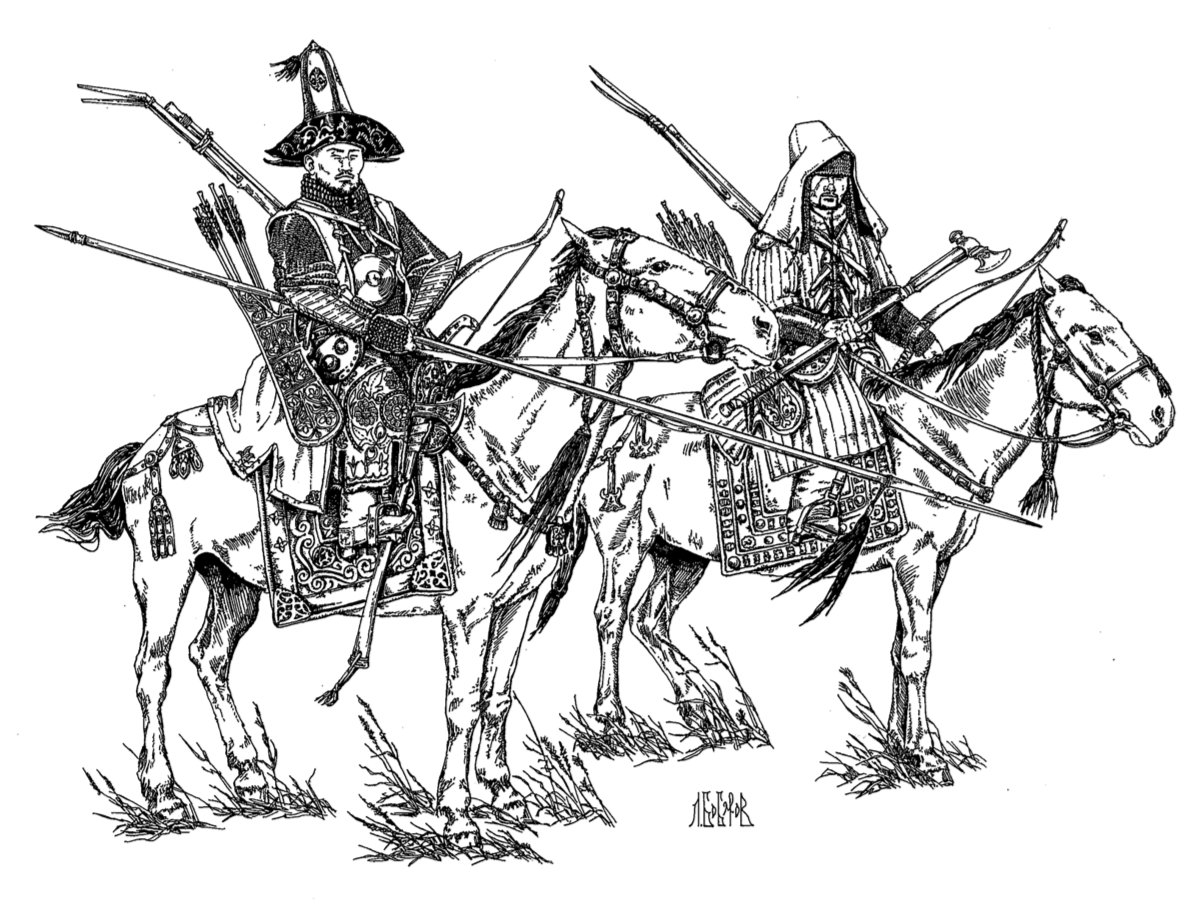
A Kazakh sultan and his warrior

In the second half(autumn) of the 1740, Dzungars resumed their campaign. According to information from Abyz Baibolat to the chancellor Iamyshev, Galdan Tseren began to destroy the Kazakh nomadic camps. Abilmambet Khan urgently formed a detachment of 2,000 and launched counteroffensive on the Dzungars.The Kazakhs, having been prepared in advance, offered a courageous and organized resistance to Dzungars. The battles continued until the beginning of 1741. According to historian Ilya Zlatkin, between 1741 and 1745, Galdan Tseren made several diplomatic attempts to resolve territorial and political disputes in his favor, but these efforts were unsuccessful. Consequently, the Dzungar nobility launched a renewed offensive with even greater zeal against the Kazakhs, who were persistently fighting to reclaim Semirechye and expel the Oirat forces from the region. During the campaigns of 1741, the Dzungars tried to cut off the Kazakhs from the Russian fortified lines and the road to the Baraba Steppe. In one of his conversations with Lieutenant Proskuryakov, the Dzungar commander-in-chief declared that he would send two thousand Kalmyks directly to Baraba to search for the enemies of the Kassack Horde, since Kalmyks had heard that there were many Kassacks there at Baraba. Noyon Septen, having arrived at the Yamyshev fortress, confirmed this message, adding that the Dzungar troops intend to go down the Irtysh to the local Yamyshev side to Om to destroy the Kassack Horde and that is why they are now going to gather a council. The Dzungar offensive of early 1741 exploited Kazakh disunity. Abulkhair Khan of the Junior Jüz secretly negotiated with Galdan Tseren, offering submission and a political hostage (amanat) in exchange for control over Turkestan and Tashkent.

=== Dzungar–Russian negotiations (1740–1741) ===
In January 1741, a Dzungar embassy led by Lama-Dashi and Nauruz Kazy engaged in negotiations with the Siberian Governor, P. Buturlin. The envoys primarily sought to determine which Kazakh groups were officially under Russian protection and their exact locations. Buturlin replied that he was only aware of Abulkhair Khan of the Junior Jüz and his people being Russian subjects. Crucially, Buturlin failed to acknowledge that a significant portion of the Middle Jüz, led by Abilmambet Khan and Ablai Sultan, had recently accepted Russian citizenship. Assured by this response, the Dzungar ambassadors promised not to attack Russian subjects but declared their intent to wage war against independent Kazakhs, requesting that Russian forces not interfere.

Although the embassy's formal pretext was to congratulate Empress Anna Ioannovna (who had died in 1740), their true objective was diplomatic preparation for the invasion of the Kazakh steppes. The envoys actively gathered intelligence from Russian officials regarding the population sizes and nomadic routes of various Kazakh tribes. Furthermore, they explicitly requested that Kazakh nomads not be allowed to cross into Russian territory. Buturlin not only agreed to this but informed the ambassadors that strict orders had already been dispatched to all fortresses to maintain tight security and treat any approaching Kazakhs as "hostile" forces.

Emboldened by the success of these negotiations, the Dzungar envoys boldly announced that their offensive against the Kazakhs would begin on February 15. When Russian border authorities expressed concern over Dzungar troop movements near their fortresses and the crossing of the left bank of the Irtysh River, the envoys explained it was a forced maneuver because the Kazakhs had burned the pastures in the originally planned staging areas. Ultimately, the political and military environment was highly favorable for the Dzungars. Siberian authorities essentially gave Galdan Tseren a free hand to attack the Middle Jüz. Meanwhile, the Qing dynasty posed no threat to Dzungaria, and the Kazakh leadership remained deeply divided, with many prominent figures—including Abilmambet, Barak Sultan, and several notable batyrs—distracted by ongoing conflicts with the Volga Kalmyks.

The immediate pretext for this renewed Dzungar offensive was the series of incursions into Dzungaria led by Barak Sultan and an adventurer known as Karasakal. Karasakal, having fled from Bashkiria, presented himself as Shono Louzan—the deceased son of the former Dzungar ruler Tsewang Rabtan. He managed to convince many Kazakh feudal lords to support his claim to the Dzungar throne, promising to be a "friendly neighbor" once in power. According to historians, the Kazakhs, being long-standing rivals of the Dzungar, "eagerly gathered around the glorious leader" in hopes of establishing a favorable regime in the Urga. This provocation gave Galdan Tseren a definitive reason to launch a massive punitive operation against the Kazakhs.

== Dzungar Invasion of 1741 ==
=== Offensive directions ===
In late February 1741, a massive Dzungar army of 30,000 troops, commanded by Septen and Lama Dorji, launched a full-scale invasion of the Middle Jüz territories. The offensive was strategically executed from three different directions to maximize the devastation. According to reports from Fyodor Naydenov, a Russian Cossack sent to locate Abilmambet Khan, the Dzungar forces were split into three primary columns: one division advanced along the Ishim River, while the other two moved from the south, originating from the areas of Tashkent and Turkistan. These coordinated strikes aimed to bypass Kazakh defenses and systematically raid their settlements. Naydenov noted that the Dzungars were "devastating the Kirghiz-Kaisaks [Kazakhs] everywhere" they encountered them.

=== Northwestern Front offensive ===
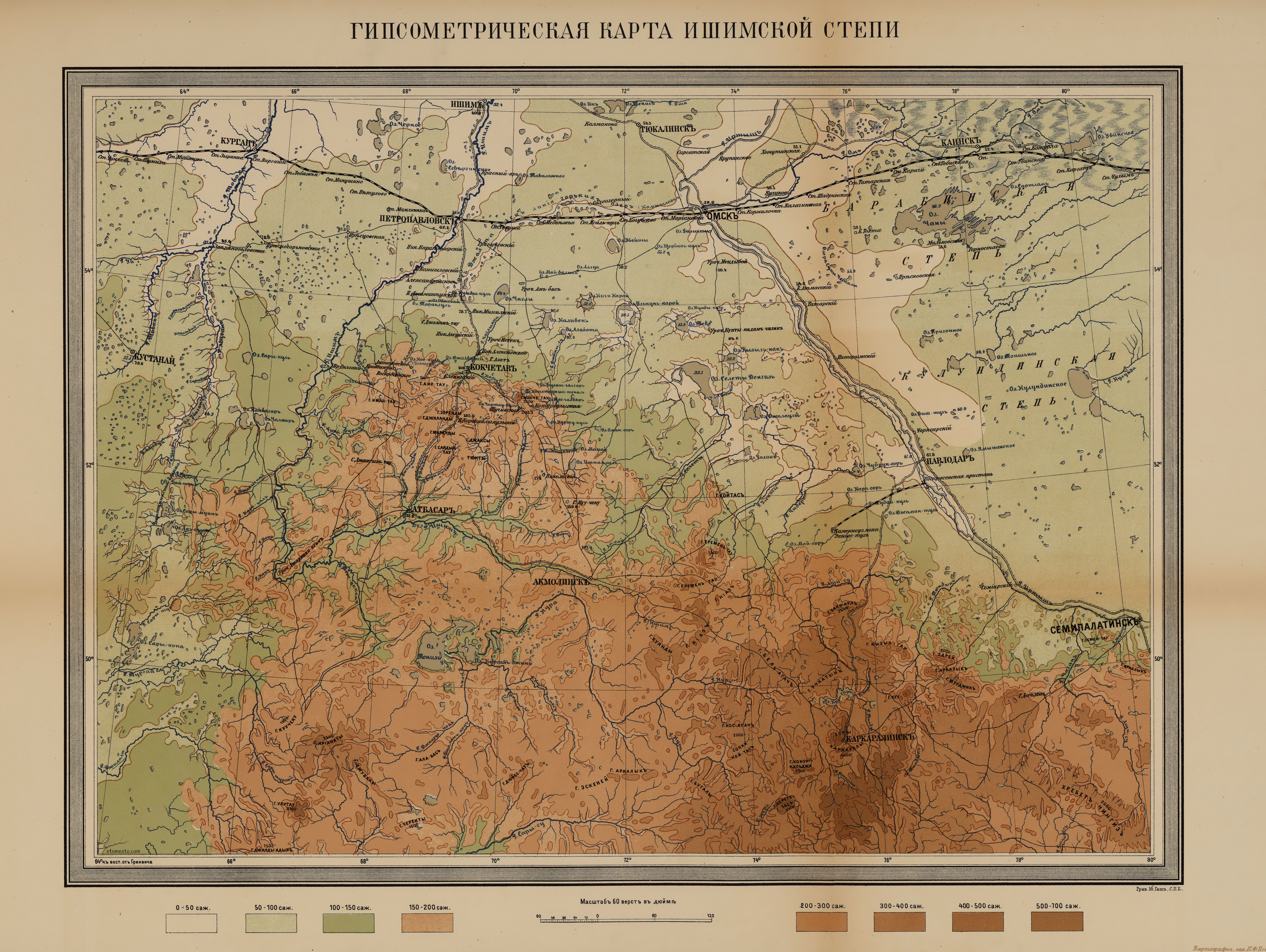
Ishim steppe

By the spring of 1741, the Dzungar offensive forced Abilmambet Khan to initiate a large-scale evacuation of his subjects from their traditional grazing lands, directing the withdrawal westward. Under his leadership, the clans crossed the Or River and moved toward the Orenburg line, pursued by a "multitude of Oirats." Abilmambet sought to secure the remaining population along the Ilek and Yaik rivers within the territories of the Junior Jüz, though Dzungar detachments continued their relentless pursuit. A report from the Cossack Fyodor Naydenov detailed a significant encounter near the headwaters of the Ilek, where a Dzungar force captured over 3,000 Kazakhs. The Dzungars "defeated the Kirghiz-Kaisaks [Kazakhs]... killing many and taking others captive," while seizing all their livestock. Following this blow, Abilmambet Khan continued to direct the withdrawal further down the Yaik with a remaining retinue of 30 kibitkas. Simultaneously, Abulkhair Khan expressed grave concern to the Russian authorities, stating in March 1741 that the Dzungars had "surrounded us from all sides." Fearing an imminent invasion of the Junior Jüz, Abulkhair and his representatives, including Kutyr Batyr and Baybek, petitioned the Russian government to construct a new fortress on the Syr Darya river. This request was intended to create a defensive buffer against both the Dzungars and potential threats from the Persian Empire.

While the Septen army was marching along the Shiderty River, they were attacked by 200 Kazakh hordes. The Kazakhs were defeated and Abylai himself was captured. Shortly thereafter, Dzungar forces secured the surrender of another group, leading to the capture of Barak Sultan, Durgun Sultan, and several prominent leaders like Kobu Tygan Batyr, all of whom were subsequently sent to the Dzungar heartland under heavy guard.

Many Kazakh nomadic camps were completely destroyed, and their livestock and people were driven off to Dzungaria. According to the report of the Oirat envoy Galzat, Septen's army returned with three thousand prisoners, among whom was Sultan Abylai with two hundred warriors. Sultans and batyrs were also captured.

Despite these successes, the Dzungars failed to achieve their main goal—to defeat the main forces of the Middle Zhuz and devastate its population. The bulk of the Kazakh uluses migrated beyond the Tobol, after which the enemy sent a guide from among the captives. He deliberately led them through frost and snow, resulting in many freezing to death. The enraged Dzungars burned him and, abandoning their further advance, returned. About 15,000 warriors returned with Septen, while the other detachments continued to operate in disarray, "behind the rocks and close to Kyrgyz dwellings."

=== Southern Front offensive ===
The Dzungar command's offensive against the Kazakhs from the south was unsuccessful. According to the June 10, 1741 testimony of Kyichik Chuganov, a Yenisei Kyrgyz who had escaped from Dzungar captivity to Kuznetsk, a military confrontation took place in February 1741. (Note: known in the Oirat calendar as the month of Chegan Tsara) Chuganov reported that during this battle, the Kazakh forces overpowered the Dzungar army, inflicting casualties and destroying the Dzungar right wing.

Prior to this battle in the south, Kazakh detachments had penetrated enemy lines and eliminated the ulus (headquarters and encampment) of Septen Noion. Batyr Oljabai was prominent during these military operations. Due to his role in disrupting Dzungar logistics and leading counterattacks, Kazakh oral traditions and historical songs describe Oljabai as the vanquisher of Galdan Tseren.

== Conclusion of 1741's Campaign ==
By May 1741, the military phase of the conflict, which had lasted over three years, drew to a close. Despite successful local counterattacks by Kazakh detachments, the Dzungar Khanate maintained a strategic advantage. Historian I. A. Popov attributed this to the centralized, autocratic power of Galdan Tseren, who commanded a modernized army of up to 80,000 troops equipped with firearms. In contrast, the Kazakh khans' authority was significantly limited by the tribal nobility (starshina), who prevented the concentration of power and resources. Geopolitical factors also contributed to the outcome, specifically the 1740 peace treaty between Dzungaria and the Qing Dynasty, which allowed Galdan Tseren to focus his entire military might on the Kazakh steppe. Furthermore, the passivity of the Russian colonial administration left the Kazakhs without effective diplomatic or military support from the north. Following these setbacks, the Dzungar Khuntaiji attempted to force the sultans of Middle Jüz to formally recognize Dzungar suzerainty. While I.A. Popov and I.V. Moiseev emphasize the structural superiority of the Dzungar state, some military historians, such as A. Kushkumbayev, argue that the campaign was a strategic failure for Galdan Tseren. Despite the capture of Sultan Ablai, the Dzungars failed to achieve their ultimate goal of annihilating the Kazakh military forces or establishing permanent control over the Middle Jüz territories.

In late spring 1741, Septen returned to Dzungaria with a rich booty: a large quantity of livestock and 3,000 captives, mostly young men. According to historian Sh. B. Chimitdorzhiev, the Dzungars turned back in response to Russian demands to cease attacks on the Kazakhs, who were subjects of Russia.

In May 1741, the last Kazakh-Dzungar war ended. Despite some victories for the Kazakhs, who were also fighting the Volga Kalmyks at the time, they suffered defeat.

== Steppe Crisis ==
=== Peace negotiations ===
In the summer of 1741, Middle and Junior Jüz councils opted for peace over continued conflict, dispatching a mission led by Akchura Batyr to Galdan Tseren. This diplomacy was confirmed by the 1741 testimony of a captive named Urazay and 1742 reports from Bashkir travelers, who observed the Kazakh delegation returning accompanied by Dzungar envoys.

Galdan Tseren countered the peace proposal with stringent demands: the delivery of ten high-ranking deposit, including the children of Barak Sultan and Shakshak Janibek, and the immediate extradition of the Bashkir rebel Karasakal. The Kazakh leaderships employed a stalling tactic, informing the envoys that a final decision required a collective council, which was delayed as the clans were currently dispersed and migrating toward Orenburg.

=== Persian Factor ===
While the 1741 Dzungar offensive intensified from the east, the Junior Jüz faced an emerging threat from the south. Following his conquest of the Khanate of Khiva, the Persian ruler Nader Shah harbored ambitions to advance Kazakh Khanate along the Syr Darya to seize Turkestan and Tashkent. This forced Abul Khair Khan into a complex diplomatic maneuver, Abulkhair tried to play a diplomatic game between Afsharid Iran and the Russian Empire. The perceived Persian threat was further magnified by intelligence gathered from the southern borders. According to the surveyor Ivan Muravin, Persian officers confirmed that following the fall of Khiva, Nader Shah intended to advance along the Syr Darya to seize Turkestan and Tashkent. This atmosphere of uncertainty was exacerbated by reports from Bashkir rebels who had fled to the Kazakh Steppe alongside Karasakal. In 1742, these refugees informed the Cossack Fyodor Naidenov that the Persian army had allegedly already captured Turkestan and all surrounding Muslim settlements. While these reports were based on exaggerated rumors rather than direct military occupation, they played a critical role in the "Steppe Crisis," intensifying the diplomatic pressure on both the Kazakh leadership and Galdan Tseren to secure their respective interests in Central Asia.

=== The Dzungar Ultimatum of 1742 ===
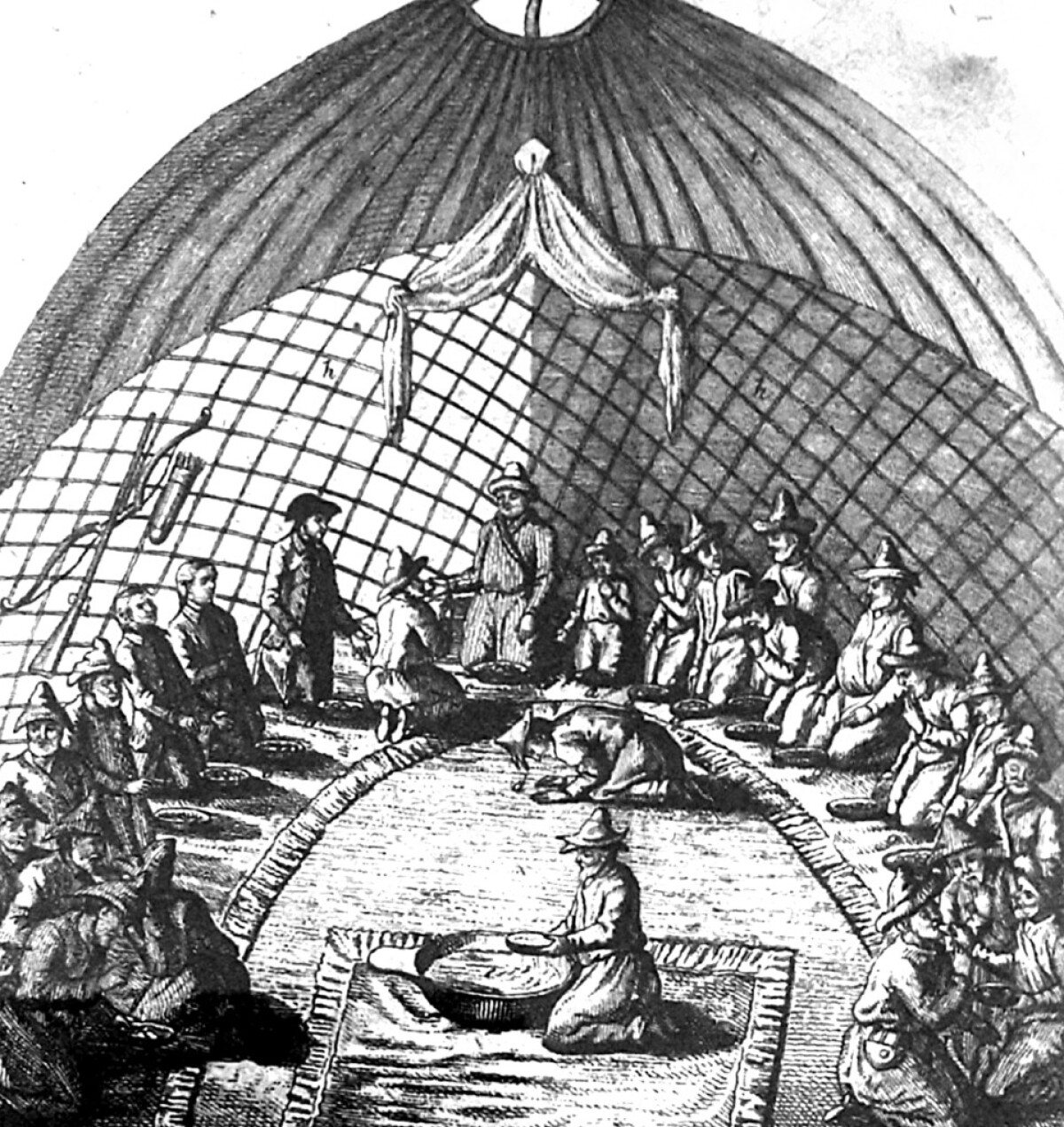
Horde of Abul Khair Khan

In April 1742, amid geopolitical pressure from both Dzungaria and Persia, Galdan Tseren issued a series of ultimatums to the Kazakh leadership. According to reports from the English merchant Hock and Russian officer Dmitry Gladyshev, the Dzungar ruler demanded that Abilmambet Khan and other high-ranking elders relocate to Turkestan to establish it as an administrative center under Dzungar oversight. The terms included a yearly tribute of one corsac fox skin per household from the Middle and Junior Jüz, unhindered passage for trade caravans, and a cessation of raids on Dzungar territories. Failure to comply carried a threat of total devastation by two Dzungar armies. These demands exposed the complex diplomatic maneuvers of the era; Gladyshev revealed that in 1740, Abul Khair Khan had secretly offered submission to Galdan Tseren and promised his son as an amanat (hostage) in exchange for control over Turkestan and Tashkent. Such actions highlighted the desperate competition between Kazakh factions to recover ancestral territories amidst the escalating Dzungar threat. In June 1742, Galdan Tseren sent an ultimatum to Abul Khair Khan demanding the submission of the Lesser Jüz. The conditions required the Khan to send his son, Aichuvak Sultan, to the Dzungar court as an amanat (hostage) with a wife and white yurts. Additionally, the sons of nine influential starshinas were to be surrendered, and a tribute of one corsac fox skin per hundred households was imposed. Galdan Tseren also demanded the extradition of Karasakal and unhindered passage for Dzungar caravans. On June 18, 1742, Abul Khair forwarded this letter to Governor Ivan Neplyuyev, leading to Russian diplomatic intervention to prevent Dzungar control over the Lesser Jüz and Middle Jüz. In the Lesser Jüz, an assembly of 1,500 people debated the Dzungar terms; biys urged reconciliation due to overcrowded pastures, though Abul Khair Khan deferred his decision to consult Ivan Neplyuyev. Moiseev emphasizes that accepting these terms signified the recognition of Dzungar suzerainty rather than total submission. The Middle Jüz nobility was divided: Barak Sultan prioritized the Russian alliance for stability, whereas Abulmambet Khan and Abulfeiz Sultan accepted the Dzungar terms to recover Southern Kazakh territories and Tashkent trade routes, sending their sons as hostages to Galdan Tseren.

=== Diplomatic Maneuvers ===
In March 1742, Abul Khair Khan reported to Empress Elizabeth Petrovna that Abulmambet Khan, Barak Sultan, and others had decided to submit to the Dzungars, though historians view this as an attempt to discredit his rivals. On May 20, 1742, the Russian Senate decreed to reinforce border fortifications to secure trade routes to Central Asia. Simultaneously, Galdan Tseren issued a final ultimatum for total Kazakh submission, threatening a large-scale invasion.

On September 2, 1742, Ivan Nepluyev formally demanded an end to Dzungar interference and the release of Sultan Ablai. Despite Russian military precautions, Galdan Tseren ignored these demands, exposing the limits of Russian protection. The crisis was exacerbated by mutual distrust between Abul Khair and Abulmambet, hindering a coordinated response.

By late 1742, Abulmambet Khan sent his son, as an amanat (hostage) to Galdan Tseren in exchange for control over Turkestan. When the Dzungar ruler demanded hostages from every Kazakh, successfully challenged this demand by comparing it to Russian policy, forcing Galdan Tseren to withdraw the additional terms. Soon the khan of the Younger Zhuz, Abulkhair, sent his son to Dzungaria.

To weaken Kazakh-Russian ties, Galdan Tseren used the release of captives, primarily Sultan Ablai, as leverage. During an embassy visit, Ablai was briefly kept in chains to demonstrate Dzungar dominance. However, he was later granted relative freedom under surveillance in a private yurt as negotiations for the release of all captives continued.

== Treaty of Urga (1743) ==
=== Diplomatic Context and the Miller Mission ===
While traditional Soviet historiography linked Ablai Sultan's release to the Russian diplomatic mission led by Major Miller, modern analysis shows this mission yielded no practical results. The Dzungars detained Miller's embassy for several months, and Galdan Tseren ultimately refused to receive them, dismissing the envoys without negotiation. The primary reason for the settlement was Galdan Tseren's realization of the strategic error in launching a sudden attack on the Kazakhs while facing escalating tensions with the Qing dynasty, the Russian Empire, and internal dissent. Recognizing Ablai's authority and ability to influence Kazakh-Dzungar negotiations, the Dzungar ruler sought to turn him into a key political ally.

=== Treaty Terms and Hostage Exchange ===
The peace process was initiated in March 1743 at the Dzungar headquarters (Urga) along the Ili River. Following the arrival of hostages (amanats) from Abulmambet Khan, Barak Sultan, and other Kazakh leaders, the formal terms of the treaty were established. The agreement stipulated the maintenance of peaceful, neighborly relations, the cessation of all hostilities, and mutual military assistance if necessary. With the treaty secured, Ablai and his son were officially freed to return home on June 7, 1743. However, in accordance with the agreement, Ablai was required to send his other sons to Dzungaria as replacements. According to Russian reports by Ivan Neplyuyev and Savva Sobolev, Galdan Tseren treated these royal hostages with great favor to win their loyalty; the Kazakh princes lived in comfortable yurts and socialized freely with Galdan Tseren's own children. After a months-long journey from the Ili River, Ablai Sultan finally returned to his homeland along the Ishim River on September 5, 1743. Russian border officials noted that Ablai returned from the Dzungars with substantial spoils. He was accompanied by 35 Sultans who had been in captivity with him, including Jolbars Sultan. Ablai's release was marked by high honors rather than the status of a former prisoner. Galdan Tseren bestowed upon him lavish personal gifts, including a gold-embroidered tent (palatka), a gold-covered fur coat, a folding iron tent, and gilded armor, as well as a Dzungar bride (who reportedly became the mother of Kasym Sultan). Furthermore, every single one of Ablai's captive companions was gifted a gold-plated sword and a silver-woven belt. Although Kazakh rulers sent hostages to maneuver between Russia and Dzungaria, but commoners disapproved of this tactic. Galdan Tseren urged an anti-Russian alliance, emphasizing their shared nomadic heritage. Facing Russian inaction and Dzungar pressure, rulers like Ablai and Abulmambet engaged in active cooperation. However, this was a diplomatic strategy driven by personal interests, not an acknowledgment of Dzungar depence. Meanwhile, an influential faction led by Abulkhair firmly resisted Dzungar domination.

== Aftermath ==
The normalization of relations was so profound that by early 1745, Russian Lieutenant F. Ablyazov reported seeing Kazakhs peacefully migrating and grazing their herds along the "Tsar-Gurbanu" river, deep within recognized Dzungar territory.

== Bibliography ==
- Tarak, Änuar. (2014). Abylai khan (in Kazakh). Almaty: Qazaqstan. p. 494. ISBN 978-9965-10-127-4.
- Erofeeva, Irina. V. (2007). Хан Абулхаир: полководец, правитель, политик (in Russian). International Abulkhair Khan Foundation (3rd, revised and expanded ed.). Almaty: Daik-Press; Kazakh Research Institute for Cultural Heritage of Nomads. p. 456. ISBN 9965-798-64-8.
- Igisin, Qusman. (2002). Uly dala: Tarihi-ghibrattyq shezhire [The Great Steppe: A historical and educational chronicle] (in Kazakh). Astana: Foliant. ISBN 9965-612-49-8.
- Kasymbaev, Zh. K. (1999). Государственные деятели казахских ханств (XVIII в.) [State figures of the Kazakh khanates (18th century)] (in Russian). Almaty: Bilim. ISBN 5-7667-2307-5.
- Zlatkin, I. Ya (1983). История Джунгарского ханства, 1635-1758 [History of the Dzungar Khanate, 1635-1758] (in Russian) (2nd ed.). Moscow: Nauka.
- Kozybayev, M. K.; Aldazhumanov, K. S.; Asylbekov, M. Kh.; Kasymbayev, Zh. K. (2002). Қазақстан тарихы (көне заманнан бүгінге дейін). Бес томдық [History of Kazakhstan (from ancient times to the present day). In five volumes.] (in Kazakh). Vol. 3. Almaty: Atamura. ISBN 9965-05-545-9.
- Aqqoshqarov, E. (1997). Қазақ тарихынан [From Kazakh history] (in Kazakh). Almaty: Zhalyn. ISBN 5-610-01274-0.
- Abuev, K. (1994). Қазақстан тарихының «ақтаңдақ» беттерінен [From the "blank" pages of the history of Kazakhstan] (in Kazakh). Almaty: Kazakhstan. ISBN 5-615-01456-3.
- Kushkumbaev, Aibolat (2001). The Military Affairs of the Kazakhs in the 17th–18th Centuries (in Russian). Almaty: Daik-Press. p. 182. ISBN 9965-441-44-8.
- Moiseev, Vladimir (1991). Pishchulina, Klavdiya (ed.). The Dzungar Khanate and the Kazakhs (17th–18th Centuries) (PDF) (in Russian). Almaty: Gylym; Institute of Uighur Studies, Academy of Sciences of the Kazakh SSR. p. 238.
- Kadyrbaev, Alexander (2023). "On the History of Relations between the Volga Kalmyks and the Oirats of Dzungaria with the Nogais, Turkmens, and Kazakhs in the 17th–18th Centuries". Bulletin of Kalmyk University (in Russian). 3 (59). doi:10.53315/1995-0713-2023-59-3-6-16.
- Barthold, V. V. (1962). Four Studies on the History of Central Asia. Vol. 1. Brill. p. 162. ISBN 978-90-04-00149-7.
- Adle, Chahryar (2003). History of Civilizations of Central Asia (5th ed.). UNESCO, Adle Chahrayar. p. 934. ISBN 978-8120820463.
