= Abul Khair–Neplyuyev conflict =

Series of military conflicts between the Kazakh Khanate and the Russian Empire

- Part of the Abul Khair–Barak conflicts
Date	1743–1744; 1746–1747
Location	Modern-day Kazakhstan and Russia
Result	Kazakh victory: Russo-Kazakh and Russo-Asian trade were almost completely paralyzed

Belligerents
Kazakh Khanate: Junior Jüz	Russian Empire; Kalmyk Khanate

Commanders and leaders
Kazakh Khanate Abul Khair Khan	(Russian Empire) Ivan Neplyuyev; Supported by: Kazakh Khanate Barak Sultan

Strength
In 1743: Kazakh Khanate 1,000–2,000; In 1746: Kazakh Khanate 1,500; In 1747: Kazakh Khanate 500	In 1747: (Russian Empire) 3,000

Casualties and losses
50 killed	(Russian Empire) (Kalmyk Khanate) 1,172–1,249 killed and captured

Abul Khair–Neplyuyev conflict — the actions of Abul Khair Khan were directed against the Russian Empire, specifically against the Orenburg governor Ivan Neplyuyev. The conflict arose because Neplyuyev supported and maintained a friendship with Abul Khair's opponent, Barak Sultan.

== Background ==
The reason for the armed conflict between Abulkhair Khan and the governor of Orenburg was that the governor Ivan Neplyuyev supported and maintained a close friendship with Abul Khair's enemy, Barak Sultan. Abul Khair himself well understood the true essence of this "famous" friendship, but he mistakenly considered the main reason for the rapprochement between the Orenburg governor and his ill-wisher to be the intrigues of Barak himself.

Subtly playing for several years on Abul Khair's heightened pride, political ambitions and temper, Ivan Neplyuyev demonstratively showed signs of attention to his main opponent, calling him his "buddy and friend" in his personal letters, sending him gifts from Orenburg and giving the Sultan praise on various occasions and reasons (issued both on behalf of Empress Elizabeth and personally on behalf of himself).

== Military conflict ==
=== Conflict of 1743–1744 ===
Soon, detachments of Kazakhs, numbering between 1,000 and 2,000 people, according to various sources, launched attacks on the vicinity of the Ilyinskaya fortress and the Chestny Krest Redoubt, capturing about a hundred prisoners and driving off a large number of cattle. The Kazakhs also raided the Kalmyk Ulus, capturing 300 Kalmyks and driving off a large number of livestock. One of the detachments attempted to break through to the Sorochinsk fortress, where the Abul Khair's son Qoja-Akhmed was situated, but the attempt was unsuccessful. To prevent further such actions, Russian officials first transferred Qoja-Akmed to St. Petersburg, and then to a Tatar Sloboda near Kazan, where he resided until the summer of 1748.

After the unsuccessful raid, Abul Khair reportedly told the interpreters from the Orenburg commission who had come to his camp, "I will kill you here, like dogs."

From 1743 to 1744, he organized several major raids on the border fortifications and settlements of the Yaik Cossacks, which culminated in "the defeat and capture of several Cherkas and Russian people." Additionally, he made several incursions into the Volga Kalmyks' nomadic lands, looted Russian and Central Asian caravans within his territories, and captured Russian residents, sending them to the auls of his subordinate sergeants and batyrs.

=== Conflict of 1746–1747 ===
During the period from 1746 to 1747, Abul Khair carried out a series of daring raids on the Orenburg Line and in the inner governorates of Russia.

On February 13, 1746, two large detachments of Kazakhs, totaling up to 1,500 people under the leadership of Abul Khair, bypassed the fortifications of the Yaik Line below Guryev, crossing the ice to the right bank of the river in the area of the town of Krasny Yar on the Zakamskaya border line. They attacked and looted the Volga Kalmyk Ulus, driving large herds of horses into the steppe. In addition to this devastating attack on the Kalmyks, the Kazakhs also raided Russian fishing stations, where they killed 75 Kalmyks, "plundered and took with them 638 Russian and Kalmyk people." Abul Khair intended to use this attack as a show of force against Governor Neplyuyev, with the aim of securing the release of his son Qoja-Akhmed and satisfying his main demand.

In January 1747, at Abul Khair's initiative, a large detachment of 500 Kazakhs from the Junior Jüz, bypassing the Yaik fortifications, once again crossed the ice through Yaik River past Guryev, and then traversed the steppe to the Volga, attacking the Kalmyk Uluses and settled agricultural settlements from which they drove off a large number of livestock. On their way back, the Kazakhs fell into an ambush set by the Yaik Cossacks. As a result of the fighting, the Kazakhs lost 50 people and retreated back into the steppe.
