= Alexander Nevsky's Lithuanian campaign =

Military campaign against the Grand Duchy of Lithuania in 1245

Lithuanian campaign of Alexander Nevsky
- Part of Russo-Lithuanian wars
Date	1245
Location	Lithuania
Result	Novgorodian victory

Belligerents
Novgorod republic	Grand Duchy of Lithuania

Commanders and leaders
Alexander Nevsky	Unknown

The Lithuanian campaign of Alexander Nevsky was the successful actions of the Pereslavl and Novgorod troops led by Alexander Nevsky against the Grand Duchy of Lithuania in 1245.

== Background ==
Since 1219, Lithuania had regularly raided Russian lands. As J. Fennel noted, the collapse of the Principality of Polotsk made it possible for the Lithuanians to launch raids on nearby lands, including Novgorod and Pskov.

== The campaign ==
The Russian prince decided to go on a campaign after the Lithuanians attacked the border area and robbed many locals. Alexander Nevsky caught the raiders and pursued them to Lithuania, where most Lithuania soldiers fled but some were surrounded and defeated. Nevsky then freed all the prisoners and defeated the Lithuanians at Lake Zizicekoe. On the way back, the Lithuanians tried to take revenge, but were destroyed again.
