= List of wars involving Uzbekistan =

This is a list of wars involving the Republic of Uzbekistan and its predecessors.

Victory Defeat Stalemate

Conflict	Combatant 1	Combatant 2	Results	Casualties
Tajikistani Civil War (1992–1997)	Tajikistan: Popular Front; Russia Uzbekistan Kazakhstan Kyrgyzstan China India (United Nations) UNMOT: Austria; Bangladesh; Bulgaria; Czech Republic; Denmark; Ghana; Hungary; Indonesia; Jordan; Nepal; Nigeria; Poland; Switzerland; Ukraine; Uruguay	United Tajik Opposition: IRP; Democratic reformists; Gorno-Badakhshan; Jamiat-e Islami; Islamic State of Afghanistan (Afghanistan) Taliban factions^{1} Supported by: al-Qaeda	stalemate	?

== See also ==
- Muslim conquest of Transoxiana
- Russian conquest of Central Asia
- Bukharan Revolution
- Armed Forces of the Republic of Uzbekistan
