= List of wars involving Tajikistan =

This is a list of wars involving Tajikistan.

== Republic of Tajikistan (1991-present) ==
Wars involving the modern day state of Tajikistan

| Conflict | Combatant I | Combatant II | Result |
|---|---|---|---|
| Tajikistani Civil War (1992–1997) | /Tajikistan; Popular Front of Tajikistan; Communist Party of Tajikistan; Socialist Party of Tajikistan; /Russia; Uzbekistan /Kazakhstan /Kyrgyzstan Supported by: Belarus (weapons supplies); UNMOT: Austria; Bangladesh; Bulgaria; Czech Republic; Denmark; Ghana; Hungary; Indonesia; Jordan; Nepal; Nigeria; Poland; Switzerland; Ukraine; Uruguay | United Tajik Opposition; Islamic Renaissance Party; Tajik Democratic Party; Party of People's Unity; Rastokhez Popular Movement; Lali Badakhshan; Afghanistan (until 1996): Jamiat-e Islami (until 1996); Supported by: al-Qaeda; (al-Qaeda) Islamic Movement of Uzbekistan; Taliban; Iran | Ceasefire: Comprehensive Peace Agreement signed; Rahmon wins the 1999 Tajik presidential election; The UTO is promised 30% of the ministerial positions. |
| Insurgency in Gorno-Badakhshan (2010–2015) | Tajikistan: Armed Forces of the Republic of Tajikistan | United Tajik Opposition: Islamic Movement of Uzbekistan; Islamic Renaissance Party of Tajikistan; Lali Badakhshan; Pamiris | Victory: Surrender of opposition forces with their leader Tolib Ayombekov in August 2012 |
| 2012 Gorno-Badakhshan clashes (24–25 July 2012) | Tajikistan | Tolib Ayombekov's militiamen (including Afghan fighters | Victory |
| Kyrgyz-Tajik border clashes (28 April–1 May 2021) | Tajikistan | Kyrgyz Republic | Ceasefire |
