= List of wars involving Kyrgyzstan =

This is a list of wars involving Kyrgyz Republic, Kyrgyz and the predecessor states of Kyrgyzstan to the present day. It also includes wars fought outside Kyrgyzstan by the Kyrgyz military.

Legends of results: Victory Defeat Inconclusive

== Muslim conquest of Transoxiana ==
- Battle of Talas – 751

== Khanates Age(1514-1854) ==
Date	Conflict	Combatant I	Combatant II	Result
1713-1895	Russian conquest of Central Asia	Tsardom of Russia Russian Empire: Kalmyk Khanate	Kazakh Khanate Emirate of Bukhara Kyrgyzs Khanate of Khiva Khanate of Kokand Turkmens	Defeat
1837-1847	Kenesary's Rebellion	Russian Empire Kara-Kyrgyz Khanate	Kazakh Khanate	Victory

== Soviet Age (1916-1991) ==
With the advent of the Soviet Union, massive repression, rapid industrialization and the struggle against class inequality began. The Kyrgyz Soviet Socialist Republic was established. In 1941, the Great Patriotic War began, to which every third resident of the Kyrgyz SSR was called up.

Date	Conflict	Combatant I	Combatant II	Result
1941-1945	World War II Raising a Flag over the Reichstag, by Yevgeny Khaldei	Allied Powers: Soviet Union; Kyrgyz SSR; USA; United Kingdom; Republic of China; France; Poland; Czechoslovakia; Kingdom of Yugoslavia; Kingdom of Greece; Denmark; Norway; Netherlands; Belgium; Luxemburg; Canada; Australia; New Zealand; India; Union of South Africa	Axis Powers: Nazi Germany; Japanese Empire; Kingdom of Italy	Victory
1979-1989	Soviet–Afghan War	Soviet Union: Kyrgyz SSR; Republic of Afghanistan	Afghan Mujahideen	Defeat

== Kyrgyz Republic (1991-present) ==
After the collapse of the Soviet Union, the Kyrgyz Republic gained independence. the country was admitted to the UN and a number of other international organizations. Due to internal political confrontations, Kyrgyzstan has experienced three revolutions, as well as several major border conflicts.

Batken Conflict (July 30 – September 27, 1999)	Kyrgyz Republic Supported by: Uzbekistan Russia	Islamic Movement of Uzbekistan	Terrorists terminated/expelled; Government of the Kyrgyz Republic regains control over previously occupied settlements
Kyrgyz-Tajik border clashes (2021)	Kyrgyz Republic	Tajikistan	Ceasefire
Kyrgyz–Tajik border clashes (2022)	Kyrgyz Republic	Tajikistan	Status-quo
