= Barak Sultan =

Khan of the Dulat and Khongirad Kazakhs

Barak Sultan Барақ Сұлтан, Baraq Sūltan
- Khan; Sultan

Khan of part of the clans of the Dulat Kazakhs
- Reign: 1749–1750
- Coronation: 1749

Khan of the Khongirad Kazakhs
- Reign: 1750s–1750
- Coronation: 1750s
- Born: Before 1717
- Died: 1750
- Burial: Turkistan, Mausoleum of Khoja Ahmed Yasawi
- Issue: Daiyr Khan, Bökei Khan, Maman, Hanqoja, Hanbaba, Şyğai
- House: House of Borjigin
- Dynasty: Töre; House of Urus Khan
- Father: Tursun Khan
- Religion: Sunni Islam

Barak Sultan (Kazakh: Барақ Сұлтан, Baraq Sūltan; ?–1750) was a descendant of Genghis Khan and a member of the last House of Genghis Khan in the Kazakh Khanate (1221–1847). He was Sultan of the Middle Juz. He is a son of Tursun Khan and great-grandfather of Alikhan Bukeikhanov.

== Biography ==
Barak Sultan was notable for having murdered his rival beheading the first Kazakh Khan in Kazakh history who took citizenship of Russia — Khan of Junior Juz Abulkhair Khan. It was revenge for Abulkhair Khan's pro-Russian policy and the last point was the alleged robbery of a caravan laden with gifts from Barak Sultan to the ruler of the Khanate of Khiva during attacks by Abulkhair Khan against the Karakalpaks, who were also under Barak Sultan's rule. One of his wives was a daughter of Galdan Tseren. During that marriage and until the death of Galdan Tseren in 1745 the war and conflicts between Kazakh Khanate and Dzungar Khanate had been stopped. As a descendant of Genghis Khan Barak wanted to become the ruler of two Turkic-Mongol states — Dzungar Khanate and Kazakh Khanate. Barak Sultan and his eldest son had been poisoned by a pro-Russian agent from Middle Juz in 1750. The death of Barak Sultan opened opportunities to expand Russian Empire over the Kazakh Steppe.
