= Ivan Neplyuyev =

Russian noble (1693–1773)

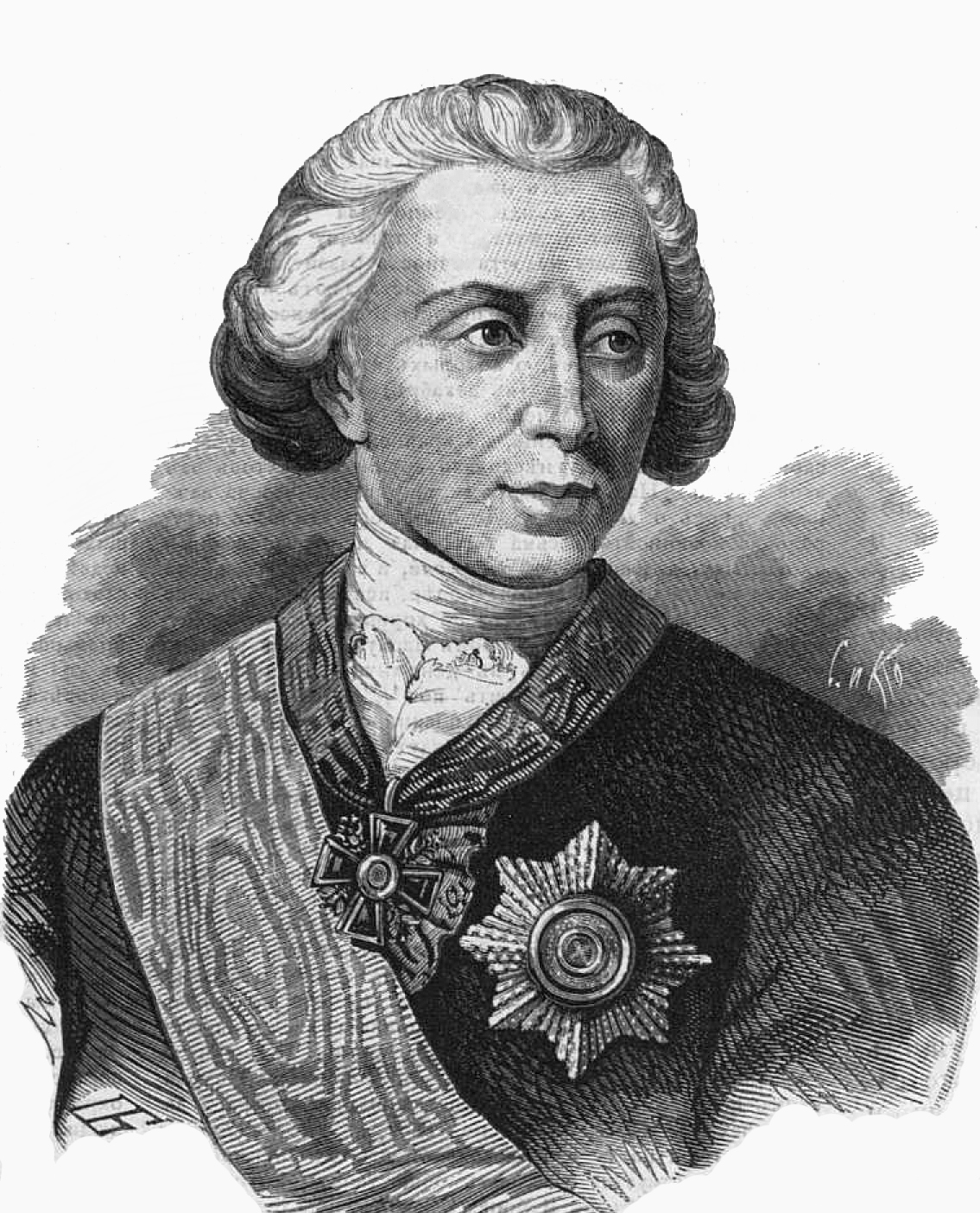
Ivan I. Neplyuyev

Ivan Ivanovich Neplyuyev (Russian: Ива́н Ива́нович Неплю́ев; 15 November 1693 – 22 November 1773) was a Russian diplomat and administrator prominent in the service of Peter the Great and Catherine the Great. His memoirs were published posthumously and his statue may be seen in Orenburg, the city he founded.

== Life ==
Neplyuev was born into an impoverished noble family in Poddubye near Novgorod. He enrolled at the local mathematical school in 1714, transferred to the Petersburg Naval Academy and then furthered his education in the naval service of Venice and Spain. He returned to Russia in 1720, winning accolades from Peter I for his learning and wit. As a reward, he was asked to supervise the wharves of Saint Petersburg.

In 1721, the Tsar dispatched Neplyuev as a secret envoy to Constantinople, where he would remain until 1734. He took part in the abortive Congress of Nemirov in 1737 and in the negotiations leading to the Belgrade Peace Treaty (1739). After Elizaveta Petrovna ascended the throne, Neplyuev was accused of irregularities and fell into disgrace, as many other dignitaries of the previous reign did.

In 1742 Neplyuev gained pardon and was sent to govern the Orenburg krai. During sixteen years of his governance, the city of Orenburg was moved to its present location and some 70 forts were built along the Samara River, Tobol River and other waterways. He founded 13 iron founderies and 28 copper plants and subdued a Bashkir uprising, led by Batarma Aleyev.

In 1760, Neplyuev was recalled to St. Petersburg and appointed a senator. Catherine II prized his experience and competence and left the capital to his administration during her visits to other parts of the country. He remained in charge of the Saint Petersburg Governorate for two years, before settling into retirement in Poddubye.
