= Outline of Tajikistan =

Landlocked country in Central Asia

The Flag of Tajikistan

The Emblem of Tajikistan

The location of Tajikistan

An enlargeable map of Tajikistan

The following outline is provided as an overview of and topical guide to Tajikistan. For a chronological outline see Timeline of Tajikistani history; for further information also see Bibliography of Tajikistani history.

Tajikistan – mountainous, landlocked, sovereign country located in Central Asia. It borders Afghanistan to the south, Uzbekistan to the west, Kyrgyzstan to the north, and China to the east. Most of Tajikistan's population belongs to the Tajik ethnic group, who share culture and history with the Persian peoples and speak the Tajik language, a modern variety of Persian. Once part of the Samanid Empire, Tajikistan became a constituent republic of the Soviet Union in the 20th century, known as the Tajik Soviet Socialist Republic (Tajik SSR).

After independence, Tajikistan suffered from a devastating civil war which lasted from 1992 to 1997. Since the end of the war, newly established political stability and foreign aid have allowed the country's economy to grow. Its natural resources such as cotton and aluminium have contributed greatly to this steady improvement, although observers have characterized the country as having few natural resources besides hydroelectric power and its strategic location.

== General reference ==
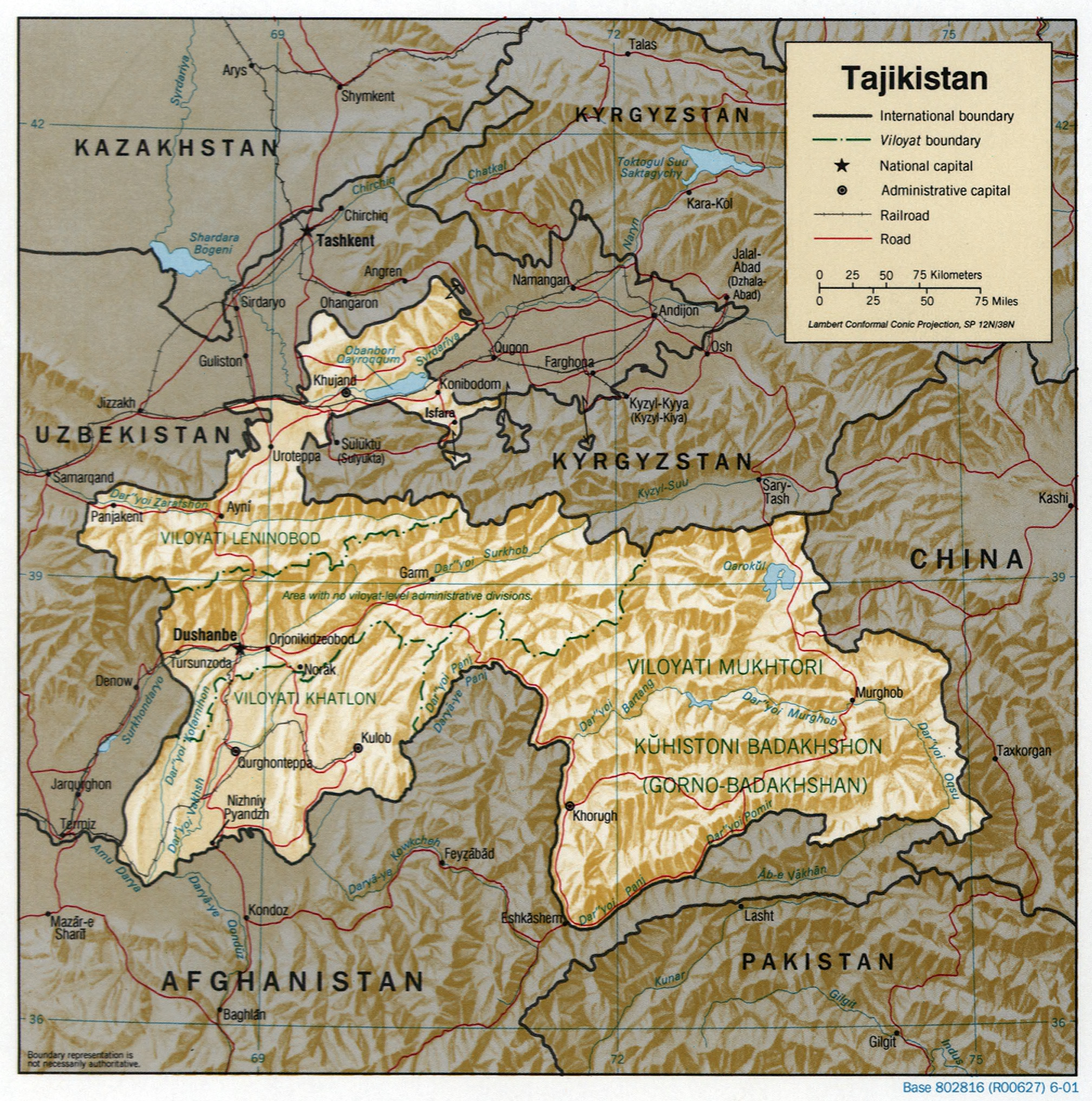
An enlargeable relief map of Tajikistan

- Pronunciation: /təˈdʒiːkɪstæn/
- Common English country name: Tajikistan
- Official English country name: The Republic of Tajikistan
- Common endonym(s): Tojikiston, Тоҷикистон
- Official endonym(s): Jumhurii Tojikiston, Ҷумҳурии Тоҷикистон
- Adjectival(s): Tajikistani
- Demonym(s): Tajikistani, Tajik
- Etymology: Name of Tajikistan
- ISO country codes: TJ, TJK, 762
- ISO region codes: See ISO 3166-2:TJ
- Internet country code top-level domain: .tj

== Geography of Tajikistan ==
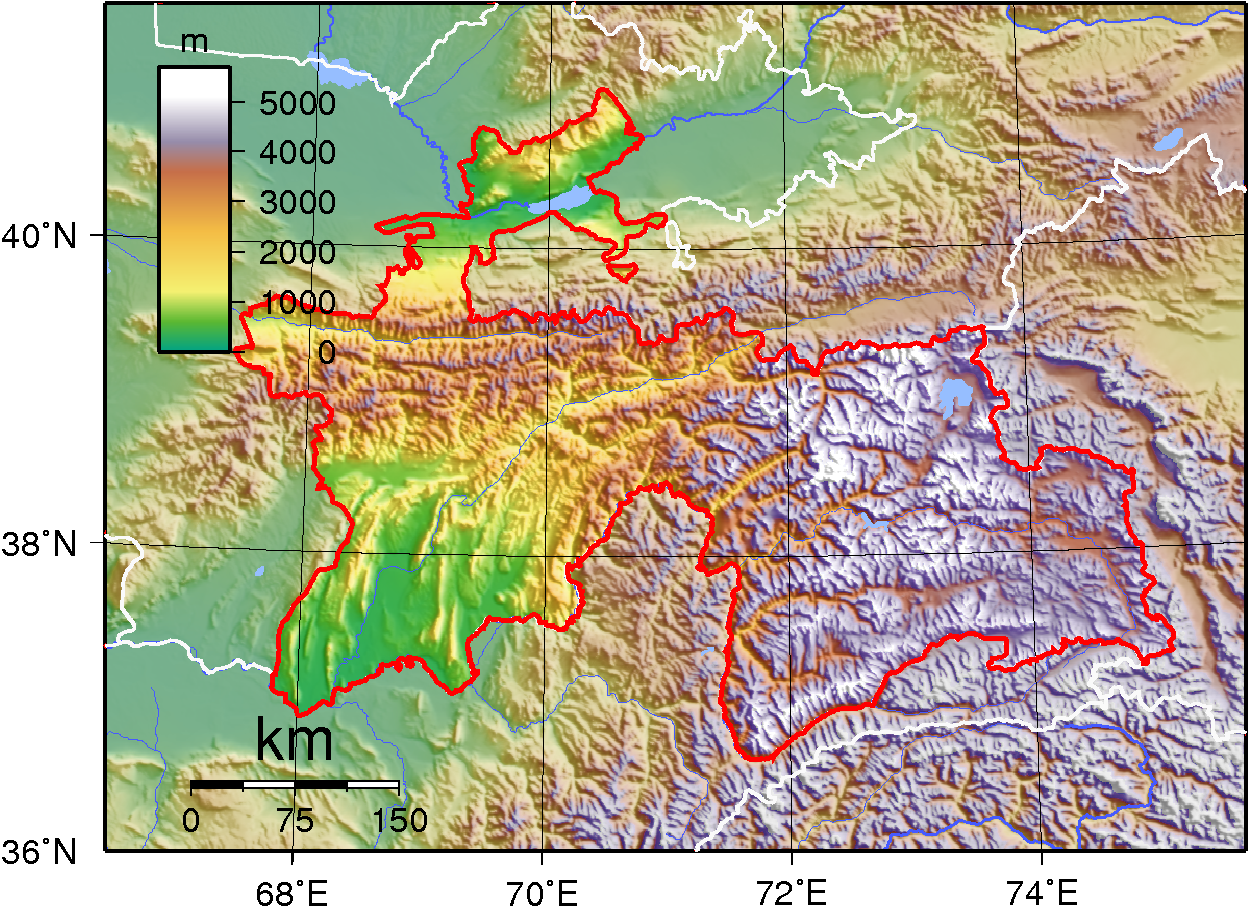
An enlargeable topographic map of Tajikistan

Geography of Tajikistan

- Tajikistan is: a landlocked country
- Location:
  - Northern Hemisphere and Eastern Hemisphere
  - Eurasia
    - Asia
      - Central Asia
  - Time zone: UTC+05
  - Extreme points of Tajikistan
    - High: Ismoil Somoni Peak 7,495 m (24,590 ft)
    - Low: Syr Darya 300 m (984 ft)
  - Land boundaries: 3,651 km

Afghanistan 1,206 km
Uzbekistan 1,161 km
Kyrgyzstan 870 km
China 414 km

- Coastline: none

- Population of Tajikistan: 7,215,700 (Jan. 2008 estimate) – 92nd most populous country
- Area of Tajikistan: 143,100 km^{2} (55,300 sq mi) – 95th in the world
- Atlas of Tajikistan

=== Environment of Tajikistan ===
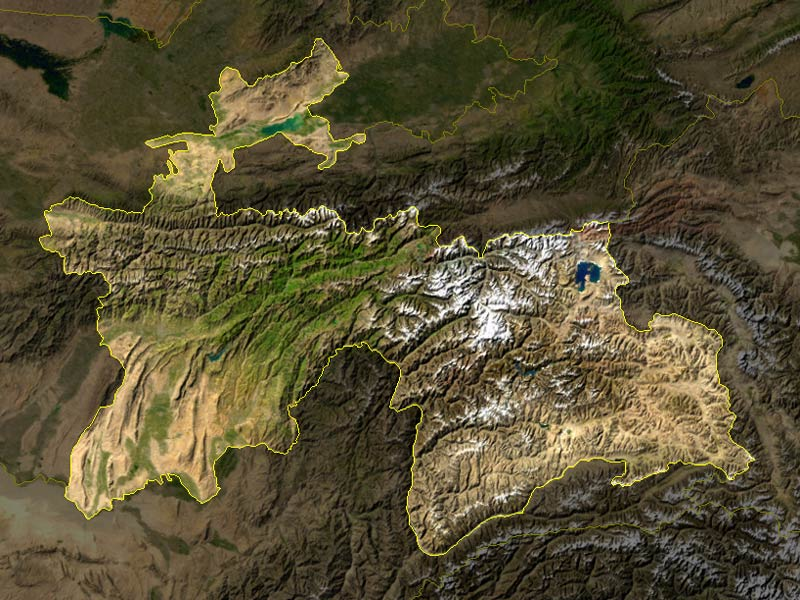
An enlargeable satellite image of Tajikistan

Environment of Tajikistan

- Climate of Tajikistan
- Environmental issues in Tajikistan
- Wildlife of Tajikistan
  - Fauna of Tajikistan
    - Birds of Tajikistan
    - Mammals of Tajikistan

==== Natural geographic features of Tajikistan ====
- Glaciers of Tajikistan
- Islands of Tajikistan: none
- Lakes of Tajikistan
- Mountains of Tajikistan
- Rivers of Tajikistan
- World Heritage Sites in Tajikistan: none

=== Regions of Tajikistan ===
Regions of Tajikistan

==== Administrative divisions of Tajikistan ====
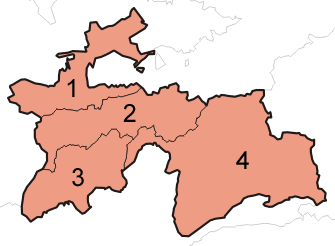

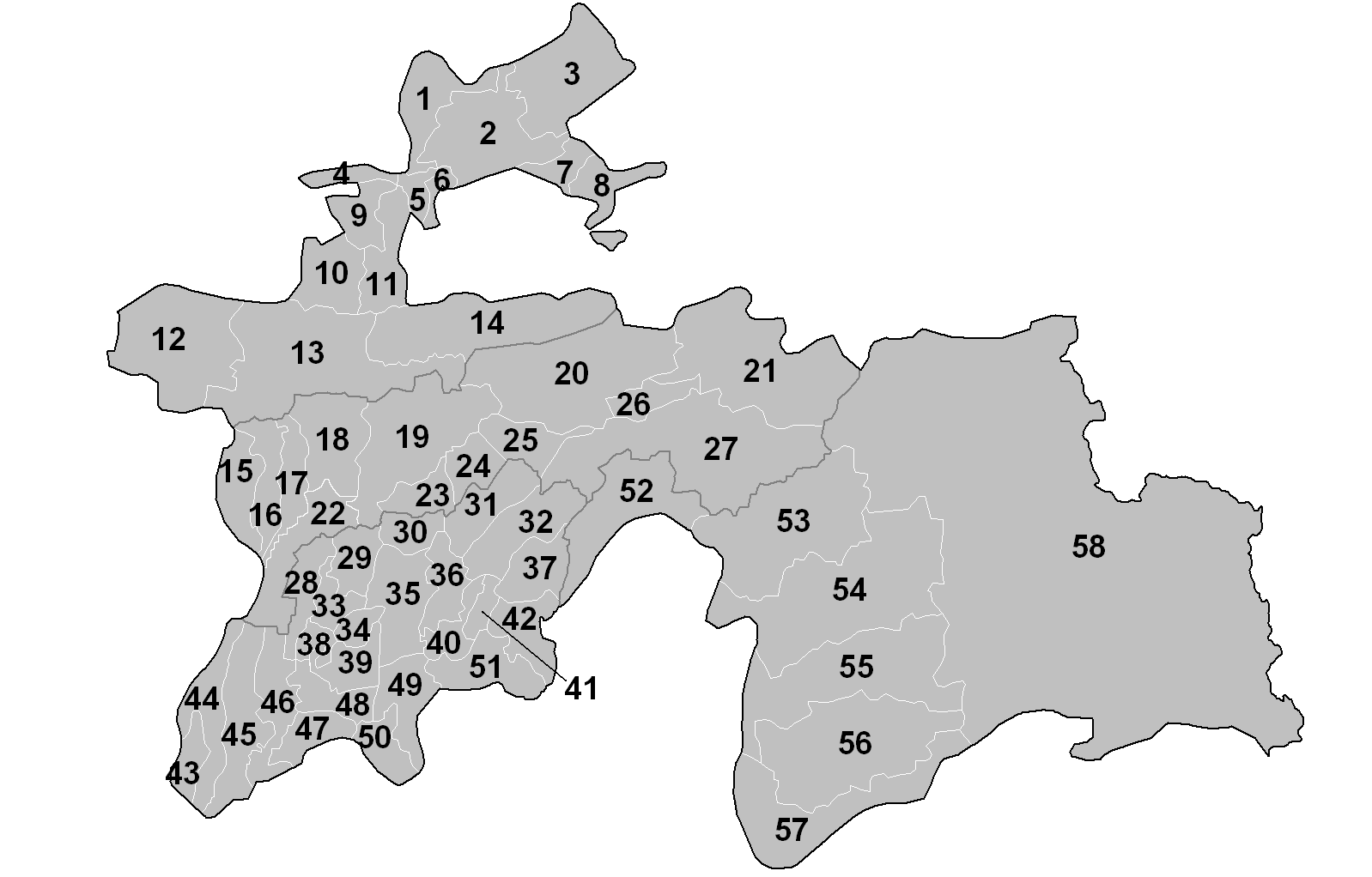
Districts of Tajikistan (keyed to list in Districts of Tajikistan)

.

- Regions of Tajikistan
  - Districts of Tajikistan
    - Municipalities of Tajikistan

===== Provinces of Tajikistan =====
Provinces of Tajikistan

- 1 Sughd
- 2 Region of Republican Subordination
- 3 Khatlon
- 4 Gorno-Badakhshan

===== Districts of Tajikistan =====
Districts of Tajikistan The provinces of Tajikistan are divided into 58 districts (Tajik: ноҳия, nohiya or Russian: район, raion).

===== Municipalities of Tajikistan =====
Municipalities of Tajikistan

- Capital of Tajikistan: Dushanbe
- Cities of Tajikistan

=== Demography of Tajikistan ===
Demographics of Tajikistan

== Government and politics of Tajikistan ==
Politics of Tajikistan

- Form of government: unitary presidential republic
- Capital of Tajikistan: Dushanbe
- Elections in Tajikistan
- Political parties in Tajikistan

=== Branches of the government of Tajikistan ===
Government of Tajikistan

==== Executive branch of the government of Tajikistan ====
- Head of state and head of government: President of Tajikistan, Emomali Rahmon
- Cabinet of Tajikistan
  - Prime Minister of Tajikistan, Kokhir Rasulzoda (since 2013)

==== Legislative branch of the government of Tajikistan ====
- Parliament of Tajikistan (bicameral)
  - Upper house: Senate of Tajikistan
  - Lower house: House of Commons of Tajikistan

==== Judicial branch of the government of Tajikistan ====
Court system of Tajikistan

=== Foreign relations of Tajikistan ===
Foreign relations of Tajikistan

- Diplomatic missions in Tajikistan
- Diplomatic missions of Tajikistan

==== International organization membership ====
International organization membership of Tajikistan The Republic of Tajikistan is a member of:

- Asian Development Bank (ADB)
- Collective Security Treaty Organization (CSTO)
- Commonwealth of Independent States (CIS)
- Economic Cooperation Organization (ECO)
- Eurasian Economic Community (EAEC)
- Euro-Atlantic Partnership Council (EAPC)
- European Bank for Reconstruction and Development (EBRD)
- Food and Agriculture Organization (FAO)
- General Confederation of Trade Unions (GCTU)
- International Atomic Energy Agency (IAEA)
- International Bank for Reconstruction and Development (IBRD)
- International Civil Aviation Organization (ICAO)
- International Criminal Court (ICCt)
- International Criminal Police Organization (Interpol)
- International Development Association (IDA)
- International Federation of Red Cross and Red Crescent Societies (IFRCS)
- International Finance Corporation (IFC)
- International Fund for Agricultural Development (IFAD)
- International Labour Organization (ILO)
- International Monetary Fund (IMF)
- International Olympic Committee (IOC)
- International Organization for Migration (IOM)
- International Organization for Standardization (ISO) (correspondent)
- International Red Cross and Red Crescent Movement (ICRM)
- International Telecommunication Union (ITU)
- International Telecommunications Satellite Organization (ITSO)
- Inter-Parliamentary Union (IPU)
- Islamic Development Bank (IDB)
- Multilateral Investment Guarantee Agency (MIGA)
- Organisation of Islamic Cooperation (OIC)
- Organization for Security and Cooperation in Europe (OSCE)
- Organisation for the Prohibition of Chemical Weapons (OPCW)
- Partnership for Peace (PFP)
- Shanghai Cooperation Organisation (SCO)
- United Nations (UN)
- United Nations Conference on Trade and Development (UNCTAD)
- United Nations Educational, Scientific, and Cultural Organization (UNESCO)
- United Nations Industrial Development Organization (UNIDO)
- Universal Postal Union (UPU)
- World Customs Organization (WCO)
- World Federation of Trade Unions (WFTU)
- World Health Organization (WHO)
- World Intellectual Property Organization (WIPO)
- World Meteorological Organization (WMO)
- World Tourism Organization (UNWTO)
- World Trade Organization (WTO) (observer)

=== Law and order in Tajikistan ===
Law of Tajikistan

- Capital punishment in Tajikistan
- Constitution of Tajikistan
- Human rights in Tajikistan
  - LGBT rights in Tajikistan
  - Freedom of religion in Tajikistan
- Law enforcement in Tajikistan

=== Military of Tajikistan ===
Military of Tajikistan

- Commander-in-chief (President of Tajikistan)
  - Presidential National Guard
  - Ministry of Defence
    - Tajik National Army
    - Tajik Air Force
    - Tajik Mobile Forces
  - Ministry of the Interior
    - Border Troops
    - Internal Troops
- Military history of Tajikistan

=== Local government in Tajikistan ===
Local government in Tajikistan

== History of Tajikistan ==
History of Tajikistan

- Economic history of Tajikistan
- Military history of Tajikistan

== Culture of Tajikistan ==
Culture of Tajikistan

- Cuisine of Tajikistan
- Ethnic minorities in Tajikistan
- Gender equality in Tajikistan
- Languages of Tajikistan
- Media in Tajikistan
- National symbols of Tajikistan
  - Coat of arms of Tajikistan
  - Flag of Tajikistan
  - National anthem of Tajikistan
- People of Tajikistan
- Prostitution in Tajikistan
- Public holidays in Tajikistan
- Religion in Tajikistan
  - Buddhism in Tajikistan
  - Christianity in Tajikistan
  - Islam in Tajikistan
  - Judaism in Tajikistan
  - Sikhism in Tajikistan
- World Heritage Sites in Tajikistan: NONE

=== Art in Tajikistan ===
- Cinema of Tajikistan
- Literature of Tajikistan
- Music of Tajikistan

=== Sports in Tajikistan ===
Sports in Tajikistan

- Football in Tajikistan
- Tajikistan at the Olympics

== Economy and infrastructure of Tajikistan ==
Economy of Tajikistan

- Economic rank, by nominal GDP (2007): 145th (one hundred and forty fifth)
- Agriculture in Tajikistan
- Banking in Tajikistan
  - National Bank of Tajikistan
- Communications in Tajikistan
  - Internet in Tajikistan
- Currency of Tajikistan: Somoni
  - ISO 4217: TJS
- Economic history of Tajikistan
- Energy in Tajikistan
  - Energy policy of Tajikistan
  - Oil industry in Tajikistan
- Health care in Tajikistan
- Mining in Tajikistan
- Tourism in Tajikistan
- Transport in Tajikistan
  - Airports in Tajikistan
  - Rail transport in Tajikistan

== Education in Tajikistan ==
Education in Tajikistan

== Health in Tajikistan ==
Health in Tajikistan

== See also ==
- Timeline of Tajikistani history
- Bibliography of Tajikistani history
- List of international rankings
- List of Tajikistan-related topics
- Member state of the United Nations
- Outline of Asia
