= Adolat Timurovna Kasymova =

Tajikistani politician

Adolat Timurovna Kasymova (born 1938) was a Communist Tajikistani politician during the Soviet years.

She served as Minister of Social Security from the years 1986–1990.

Since 1958, he was engaged in economic, social and political work. In 1958-1990. - Worked in the silk industry in the Tajik SSR, director of the Dushanbe sewing firm "Guliston", minister of domestic services of the Tajik SSR, secretary of the Presidium of the Supreme Soviet of the Tajik SSR, minister of social security of the Tajik SSR.

She was elected as a deputy of the USSR Supreme Soviet of the 6th, 7th, 8th and 9th convocations, the Supreme Soviet of the Tajik SSR of the 10th and 11th convocations.
