= Environmental issues in Tajikistan =

Environmental issues in Tajikistan include concentrations of agricultural chemicals and salts in the soil and groundwater, poor management of water resources, and soil erosion. Additionally, because of inadequate sanitation facilities, untreated industrial waste (particularly from aluminum production) and sewage combine with agricultural runoff to cause water pollution in the Aral Sea Basin. Soviet-Era mining operations in Tajikistan extracted and processed uranium, gold, antimony, tungsten, mercury, and molybdenum, each of which is known to leave toxic waste that also threatens water quality. Pockets of high air pollution caused by industry and motor vehicles have resulted in Tajikistan ranking 133rd in the world in greenhouse gas emissions. Air pollution is a particular problem during times of the year when atmospheric conditions hold industrial and vehicle emissions close to the surface in urban areas. In summer, dust and sand from the deserts of Uzbekistan and Turkmenistan cause air pollution across the entire southwestern lowland region.

Although a destructive civil war, budget shortfalls, poverty, and the dissolution of the Soviet Union reduced industrial and agricultural activity, these issues, as well as the destruction of infrastructure and loss of Soviet programs (such as the Committee on Nature Protection, state-owned agriculture, and region-wide networks of hydro posts) have amplified environmental concerns. Additionally, the Tajik government is hesitant to acknowledge these concerns, which has tensed its regional relationships.

== Water scarcity ==
In 2010, 64% of the Tajik population had access to potable water, 54% in rural areas and 92% in cities. Water shortage first became a threat in Tajikistan under the Soviet Union's pressure to expand cotton cultivation in Central Asia. During this time, minimal regulation on water use was implemented and much of it was allocated towards irrigation. The Tajik government has since expanded limits on water use, however the agencies involved in their application lack the effective judicial and legal systems necessary to implement them.

Agriculture accounts for 90% of Tajikistan's water use, and 33% of Tajikistan's irrigated land is used to cultivate cotton. Much of Tajikistan's irrigation and water treatment systems have not been updated since the end of the Soviet Era, after which a catastrophic civil war ravaged much of the countryside and further damaged already corroding infrastructure. Cotton irrigation uses a majority of Tajikistan's water resources, however the equipment used for irrigation, being outdated, is inefficient and loses a majority of the water it carries. Tajikistan has been slow to update these water systems due to a multitude of political and economic factors, such as a limited budget and mounting debt since the conclusion of the civil war. Additionally, Tajikistan has undergone pressures to cultivate less resource-heavy crops, which have been met by resistance from a politically influential cotton industry.

Climate change is expected to particularly affect Central Asia in terms of water scarcity. By 2030, demand for water sourced from glaciers in Tajikistan is projected to increase by a third, while glacial runoff is expected to decrease by 30%. As a result, Tajikistan's water use has complicated its relationship with its neighbors. Irrigation, in addition to the construction of hydroelectric dams like the Rogun on the Vakhsh, Panj, and Amu rivers without consultation, has resulted in water shortages and public outcry in Uzbekistan and Turkmenistan, as well as contributed to the shrinking of the Aral Sea. At present, projections by the World Bank indicate that annual average temperatures could rise 5.7 °C (42.3 °F) by the year 2085.

== Pollution ==
13% of Tajiks have access to public sewage and 34% are without indoor plumbing or lavatories, resulting in 38% of the population depending on water from potentially contaminated sources and subsequent outbreaks of typhoid and cholera. This lack in infrastructure dates back to the Soviet Era and was exacerbated by poverty and civil war. Other causes of water and air pollution include pesticides (particularly DDT and HCH) and fertilizers in surface runoff (exacerbated by landslides from soil degradation), industrial waste, burning of fossil fuels, and tailings from former Soviet mining operations.

Most polluted rivers in Tajikistan cross into several other Central Asian nations and are therefore a transnational problem; the Navruz experiment in 2000, which involved several Central Asian governments, discovered high levels of metals and radionuclides in the Aral Sea river basin. Otherwise, regional approaches to pollution have been limited. After the dissolution of the USSR, the region-wide network of data collection posts was fragmented, which, in combination with the destruction of hydroposts during the civil war, has restrained Tajikistan's access to information on pollution in its rivers and its subsequent response.

Consequently, Tajikistan's regional relationships have become tense. In 2005 the Uzbek government blamed Tajikistan's industrial pollution for problems in its ecosystems, public health, and agriculture. Uzbekistan has since insisted on operating under a 1994 agreement that required the neighbors to manage transnational environmental problems together, however Tajikistan maintains that its industry has had no impact on the environment and that the operation of its industrial sector is an exercise of sovereignty.

=== Industrial ===
Aluminum is Tajikistan's top export and its production is piloted by TALCO, the state aluminum company and operator of the largest aluminum plant in Central Asia in Tursunzoda. Heavy metals such as antimony, arsenic, copper, and mercury are found in rivers near aluminum plants as well as greenhouse gases and mercury in the air. All heavy metals in water are known to cause health problems when consumed, particularly arsenic, which causes liver damage, dermal lesions, and anemia, as well as mercury, which also pollutes soil and the crops that grow in it. No longer a part of a Soviet-wide supply chain, pressure for TALCO to match Soviet-Era production levels has exacerbated the environmental effects of aluminum manufacturing. The Tajik government has historically denied any ecological or health impacts related to TALCO and made plans in 2017 to partner with China in the construction of a new plant in Tursunzoda.

=== Uranium ===
From 1945 to 1965, the development of the USSR Nuclear Program resulted in the opening of the Andrasman, Chkalovsk, Digmai, and Taboshar uranium mines. Comparatively minimal cleanup efforts by Soviet and Tajik governments since the abandonment of the mines, in conjunction with Tajikistan's steep mountain topography, have caused uranium tailings to be carried by landslides into soil, pastures and public water sources. Studies in Taboshar and Digmai pit lakes and surrounding areas showed Uranium concentrations to be significantly higher than international recommendations in drinking water and local fish used for consumption. In 2008, the Tajik government claimed to have 14% of the world's untapped Uranium reserves within its borders and drew interest from China, Iran, and Russia to partner with in opening new mines.

=== Coal mining ===
Lacking effective environmental controls and regulatory enforcement, along with high levels of corruption, coal mining remains a major polluter in the country. A particular problem is water pollution, which makes the water undrinkable and damages the biodiversity of aquatic ecosystems.

== Land degradation ==
=== Soil erosion ===
The combination of land inequality, water scarcity, deforestation, and overgrazing leads to an estimated 70% of irrigated cropland being affected by soil erosion. Because the majority of rural populations are near landless, stripping steep slopes of water in mountainous areas is common practice, causing landslides and soil degradation. The effects of soil erosion include agricultural inefficiency, ecological destruction, and lower water quality from nitrification and increased pesticide use.

During the Soviet Era, agriculture was state owned and livestock was raised communally, permitting herds to migrate to remote pastures during seasons of extreme heat and cold; entire villages would often be emptied during summers and winters to migrate with livestock. Since the USSR's collapse, livestock numbers have dropped significantly, reducing pressure on grazing lands. However, under the Tajik government, territorial governments are responsible for the allocation of agricultural land, which has resulted in the private ownership of herds and pastures. Because it is less economically viable for an individual to move its herds to remote pastures and because pastures are often privately owned, livestock mobility is limited. Consequently, overgrazing has resulted in pastures without topsoil, vegetation, and ecological diversity.

=== Deforestation ===
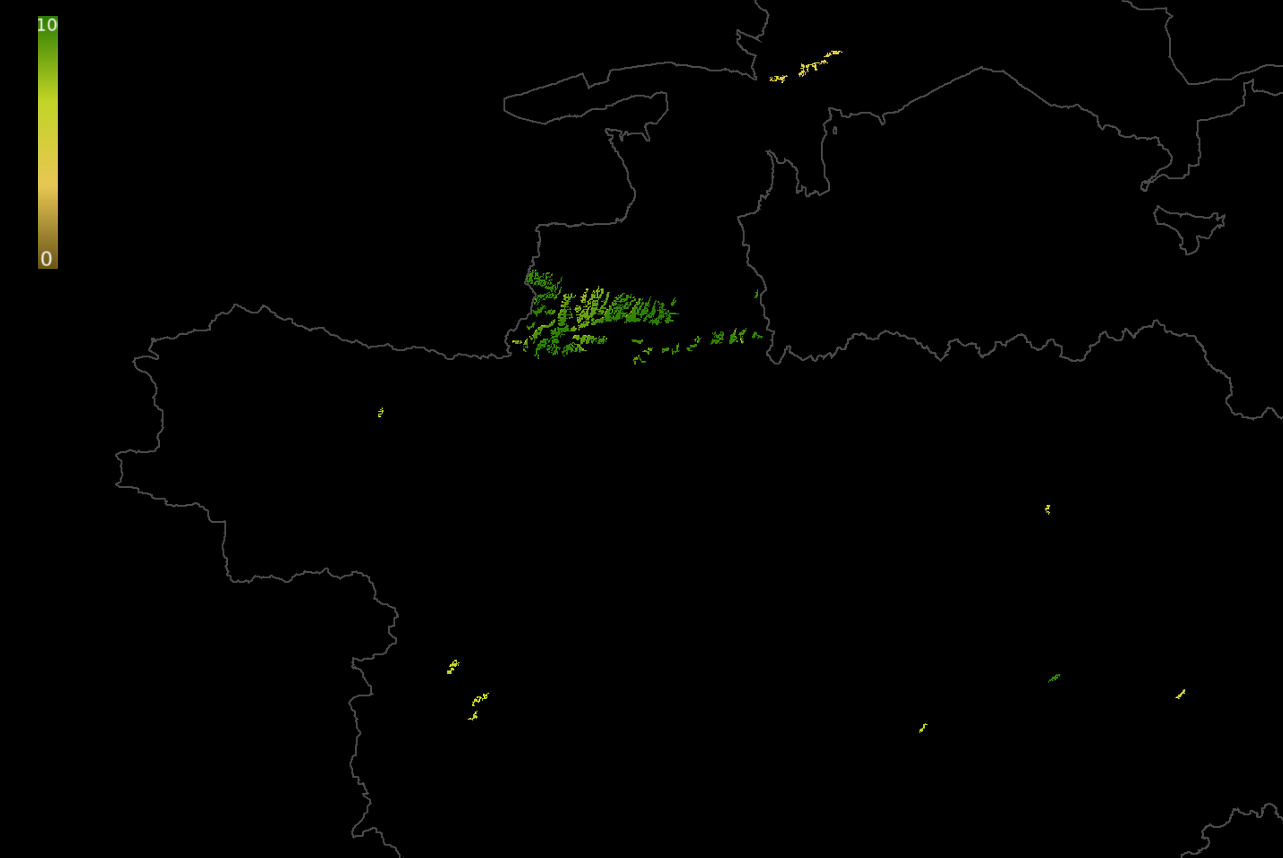
Visualisation of the Forest Landscape Integrity Index for Tajikistan, 2019

2% of Tajikistan's land is occupied by forest, a 23% decrease over the past century, two-thirds of which occurred since Tajik independence. The combination of increased population and poverty in rural areas is the main cause, which results in desertification, reduced watershed protection, and landslides. The rural population in Tajikistan has doubled since 1979, causing competition for arable land and farmers spreading to forested areas. Additionally, high energy prices caused by lacking infrastructure have forced rural populations to turn to illegal logging practices for fuel during the winter.

Tajikistan had a 2018 Forest Landscape Integrity Index mean score of 8.65/10, ranking it 21st globally out of 172 countries.

== Energy ==
Due to high prices and dependence on imports from its Central Asian neighbors, Tajikistan faces significant energy shortages. During the Soviet Era, energy was shared regionally, however, since the dissolution of the USSR and fragmentation of its Central Asian territory, regional energy agreements did not continue, leaving Tajikistan with limited domestic energy resources. The destruction of infrastructure during the civil war and refusal of World Bank funds has also contributed. In 2010, 2% of Tajik households had access to central pipeline heating and 15% to pipeline gas. TALCO, Tajikistan's main aluminum producer, consumes 40% of output from Barqi Tojik, Tajikistan's national power company.

Tajikistan has largely turned to hydropower to meet its energy demands. In 2010, hydropower accounted for 16% of Tajikistan's electric output. This shift included plans to complete the Roghun and Sangtuda dams on the Vakhsh river from the Soviet Era, in addition to expanding the Nurek hydroelectric plant and constructing several smaller dams. In addition to contributing to the shrinking of the Aral Sea and complicating Tajikistan's relationship with its neighbors, these plans have created concerns for siltation, lowering the water table, and changes to the river's ecosystem; accumulation of silt has already reduced the Nurek reservoir's capacity by 17%, and the Tajik government denies the prevalence of other ecological concerns, particularly those voiced by neighboring countries.

In April 2025, the World Bank’s Inspection Panel launched a formal investigation into the Rogun Hydropower Project (HPP) in Tajikistan, following a complaint by Rivers without Boundaries on behalf of communities in Uzbekistan and Turkmenistan. The complaint alleges that the World Bank approved funding based on outdated assessments and failed to consider serious environmental and social risks. Key concerns include reduced water flow to the Amu Darya River, potentially harming the delta’s ecosystems, increasing desertification and salinity, and threatening up to 10 million downstream residents. The Rogun reservoir also endangers the UNESCO-listed Tigrovaya Balka Reserve (2023) and critically endangered species such as the Amu Darya false shovelnose sturgeon. Critics cited lack of regional consultation, limited access to project information, and risks of retaliation against complainants.
