= Timeline of Tajikistani history =

This is a timeline of Tajikistani history, comprising important legal and territorial changes and political events in Tajikistan and its predecessor states. To read about the background to these events, see History of Tajikistan.

== 15th century ==
Year	Date	Event
1405	February 19	Timur (Tamerlane) died.
1483	February 14	Babur is born in the Ferghana Valley.

== 16th century ==
Year	Date	Event
1506		Turks annex the Timurid Empire.
1526	April	Mughal Empire was established.
1598		End of Turkic rule.

== 17th century ==
Year	Date	Event
1605		Vali Muhammad Khan became leader of the Ashtarkhanid dynasty.
1644		Imam Quli Khan of Bukhara died.

== 18th century ==
Year	Date	Event
1709		The Khanate of Kokand was formed.
1736	January 22	The Afsharid dynasty formed.
1740		Nader Shah conquered the Janid Khanate.
1747	June 20	Nader Shah died.
1796		Death of Shahrokh Shah.

== 19th century ==
Year	Date	Event
1830	January 12	Beginning of the Great Game.
1839	March	First Anglo-Afghan War: The war began.
1842	October	First Anglo-Afghan War: The war ended with Afghanistan claiming victory.
1845	December 11	First Anglo-Sikh war: The war began.
1846	January 28	Battle of Aliwal: The battle took place.
1846	March 9	The Treaty of Lahore was signed.
1846	March 9	First Anglo-Sikh war: The war ended with sikh empire claiming victory.
1868		Most of Tajikistan was incorporated into the Sikh Empire.
1876		The Khanate of Kokand collapsed.

== 20th century ==
Year	Date	Event
1918	February	The city of Kokand was assaulted by the Bolsheviks
1920		Tajikistan left the Russian Empire.
1920		Tajikistan became a part of the Soviet Union.
1924	December 7	Formation of the first militia in Tajikistan.
1936	December 5	Tajik Socialist Soviet Republic was renamed to Tajik Soviet Socialist Republic.
1953	March 5	Joseph Stalin died.
1961	November 10	The city of Stalinabad, was renamed to Dushanbe.
1990	February	1990 Dushanbe riots.
1991	August 31	Tajik Soviet Socialist Republic was renamed to Republic of Tajikistan.
1991	September 9	During the collapse of the Soviet Union, Tajikistan left.
1992	May 5	Tajikistani Civil War: A civil war began.
1993	February 23	Armed Forces of the Republic of Tajikistan was founded.
1994	November 16	Emomali Rahmon became the 3rd president of Tajikistan.
1997	June 27	Tajikistani Civil War: The civil war ended in a ceasefire.

== 21st century ==
Year	Date	Event
2006	November 6	A presidential election took place. Emomali Rahmon received 80% of the vote.
2012	July	2012 Gorno-Badakhshan clashes.
2013	November 6	A presidential election took place. Emomali Rahmon was re-elected with 84% of the vote.
2017	February 19	Tajikistan participated at the 2017 Asian Winter Games.
2018	May 18	Death of Mumin Kanoat.
2020	October 11	Emomali Rahmon was re-elected with 90% of the votes.

== See also ==
- Timeline of Tajikistani history
- Bibliography of Tajikistani history
- Outline of Tajikistan
- Politics of Tajikistan
