= Secularism in Tajikistan =

Tajikistan is secular by law. The Constitution states, "religious associations shall be separate from the state and shall not interfere in state affairs."

== Background ==
As of 2020, 97.45% of the population were Muslim (Mainly Sunni), 1.67% had no religion and 0.69% were Christian; the largest non-Muslim groups include Russian Orthodox, Baptists, Roman Catholics, Seventh-day Adventists, Jehovah's Witnesses, Lutherans, Baha'is, Zoroastrians and Jews.

== Regulations on Muslims ==
Recently, the government of Tajikistan has tightened its grip on the religiousity of the majority Muslims. The 2022 report of US government on religious freedom in Tajikistan raised concerns over the restrictions on participation of women and minors in religious services and restrictions on the religious education of youth. In 2024, the Tajik government passed a new law banning hijab declaring it a "foreign clothing"; children's celebrations of Eid festival was also banned.

== See also ==
- Freedom of religion in Tajikistan
