= Gender equality in Tajikistan =

Since their independence in 1991 from the Soviet Union, and suffering through a civil war that lasted from 1992 to 1997, Tajikistan has had a difficult time recovering economically and structurally. This economic strain has affected the family dynamic. It is now common for the men to work abroad in Russia, leaving the women to manage the land and children. Up to 74% of the population live in rural areas and rely heavily on agriculture. These women take on the duties of their husbands and or family members, along with their responsibilities as caretakersf. In some cases the men do not return to their homes and or ask for a divorce, leaving their wife and children in a vulnerable position. Tajikistan's culture is deeply patriarchal, with women not attaining the same rights as men. Domestic violence has been a prevalent issue in Tajikistan. Lack of education, resources, cultural norms, and government enforcement, have been factors in women not reporting these crimes. Another issue is the landscape of Tajikistan: 93% of the region is mountainous. The poor infrastructure and isolated villages is a contribution in the difficulty of changing the ideas surrounding genders. The Tajikistan government, with help through partnerships with organizations like the United Nations and other Non Governmental Organizations have drafted several resolutions throughout the years to ameliorate these issues within their society. However, this issue still needs to be researched more deeply.

== Gender reform laws ==
The first actions towards gender reform was joining CEDAW (Convention on the Elimination of all Forms of Discrimination Against Women) in 1993. This treaty is described as the "International Bill of Rights for Women". It was implemented by the United Nations General Assembly in 1979. The Constitution of Tajikistan was adopted in 1994. Article 17 of their constitution declares that regardless of sex, class, nationality, beliefs, etc. that they are equal citizens in the eyes of the law. In 1998, " National Plan of Action on Promoting of Status and Role of Women", was approved by the Government of Tajikistan. This addresses the issue of sexual violence and domestic violence against women and girls. In 2001, the Millennium Development Goals were introduced. World leaders in the United Nations gathered to global tackle issues such hunger, poverty, and gender inequality. In 2001, "Main Directions of the State Policy to Ensure equal rights and opportunities for men and women in the Republic of Tajikistan", was decreed. This affirmed the rights of men and women to equal access to land. Policies of women's access to microlending, entrepreneurship, and reaffirming their equal rights of were introduced women. In August 2001, a new state program was adopted, State Program titled, "Main Directions of the State Policy on Providing Equal Rights and Opportunities for Men and Women in the Republic of Tajikistan". In October 2003 a project with the Tajikistan government and UNIFEM, "Land rights and Economic Security of Women in Tajikistan", was implemented. This program looked at past and current policies towards land ownership and also promoted the equal access to land to men and women. March 2005, a law was passed by the government regarding guaranteeing equal rights of men and women and the equal practices of exercising those rights. The purpose of this law was to enforce the existing laws to promote gender equality and give opportunities to women in different settings, including posts in the government. In January 2007 the promotion of gender equality chapter was added to the National Development Strategy. In 2010 they adopted a National Strategy on activizing women's role in Tajikistan. One of its main goals is to carry out gender problems training, which was not previously actualized. In 2015, the Sustainable Development Goals were put into effect. The new 17 goals ( including gender inequality and women's access to education) are to be carried out by 2015.

== Gender land reform ==
After their independence from the Soviet Union, Tajikistan's once collective farmlands were now available for distribution. The Law on Land Reform was passed in 1992, giving rural communities an opportunity to own land. The land was not distributed equally among the population and women were in the disadvantaged group. After the civil war, a large portion of households were left without men. One of the requirements to obtain land certificates, was to have a male household member. Tajikistan's culture is patrilineal, women did not inherit or have ownership to land. This adversely affected their economy as they were excluding a huge part of their population in the agrarian sector. Land reform by Tajikistan's government became apparent in the rebuilding of their economy. Dehkan farms is a collective farming practice common within the rural communities. This sector is a big part of their GDP, second to remittances. The first dehkan laws were passed in 1992. In 2002 several amendments were added to the Law on Dehkan farms. Although in this legislation, it states no restrictions in women owning land, women were not aware of these distinctions. The lack of education regarding taxes, paperwork, agriculture, and obtaining land certificates, were obstacles for women to actively take a part in the administration of the farms. In the legislation of Dehkan farms, you are required to register all members and workers. When registered you are entitled to benefits such as state pensions and time off. The men in charge were not registering the women because there was a tax each member had to pay. It was excluding women from receiving pensions and other benefits. Also wage gap was a prevalent issue, women only earning 46% of what men earned. In April 2001, "Main Directions of the State Policy on Providing Equal Rights and Opportunities for Men and Women in the Republic of Tajikistan 2001–2010", was adopted. Its main objective is to provide women's access to land, work opportunities, economic independence, and also decision making practices. UNIFEM's collaboration with the Tajikistan Government, "Land Reform and Women's Rights to Land in Tajikistan"(2003–2005) focused on land legislation and gender views. Its purpose was to promote women's land access to land, resolve food insecurity, entrepreneurship, micro-lending, and awareness of their rights. In June 2006, President Emomali Rahmon decreed women breadwinners and single mothers have the right to own property and get land shares. In 2007, "Improved food security and enhanced livelihoods through Institutional and Gender Sensitive Land Reform", project was implemented with UNIFEM and FAO. Through this initiative, further gender analysis and special gender trainings were implemented. Since most of the men in the households migrate abroad to earn money, women were now the taking the responsibilities of the family. Getting access to primary education, legal resources, and entrepreneurship trainings are very vital to empower women in the community.
