= Freedom of religion in Tajikistan =

Freedom of religion in Tajikistan is provided for in Tajikistan's constitution. The country is secular by law. However, respect for religious freedom has eroded during recent years, creating some areas of concern.

Tajikistan's policies reflect a concern about Islamic extremism, a concern shared by much of the general population. The government actively monitors the activities of religious institutions to keep them from becoming overtly political. A Tajikistan Ministry of Education policy prohibited girls from wearing the hijab at public schools. The government uses the registration process to hinder some organizations' religious activity. Some religious organizations and individuals face harassment, temporary detention, and interrogation by government authorities. The Tajikistan government, including President Emomali Rahmon, continue to enunciate a policy of active secularism.

Some mainstream Muslim leaders occasionally express, through sermons and press articles, their opinion that minority religious groups undermine national unity.

In 2023, the country scored zero out of 4 for religious freedom; minors and most women are banned from attending mosques, and religious groups need to be registered.

In the same year, the country was ranked the 44th worst place in the world to be a Christian; it was noted that less than 1% of citizens are Christians and the Russian Orthodox Church is recognised by the government.

== Religious demography ==
The country of Tajikistan has an area of 143,000 square kilometres (55,300 sq mi) and a population of more than 7 million people, although it is difficult to determine an accurate figure due to absence of birth registrations in some rural areas.

In 2020, 97.45% of the population were Muslim (Mainly Sunni), 1.67% had no religion and 0.69% were Christian; the largest non-Muslim groups include Russian Orthodox, Baptists, Roman Catholics, Seventh-day Adventists, Jehovah's Witnesses, Lutherans, Baha'is, Zoroastrians and Jews.

== Situation in the early 2000s ==
This article is informed by the US State Dept 2007 report. Later reports are available.

The degree of religious observance varies widely. Overall, active observance of Islam appears to be increasing steadily, especially among previously less observant city residents. The majority of Muslim inhabitants (approximately 87% of the population) are of the Hanafi school of Sunni Islam. Approximately 10% of Muslims are Shi'a, the majority of whom are Ismailis. Most Ismailis reside in the remote eastern Gorno-Badakhshan region as well as certain districts of the southern Khatlon region and in Dushanbe, the capital. In 2006 a new unregistered Islamic group of the Salafi sect began worshipping in Friday mosques in Dushanbe, Sughd, and Khatlon. By 2023, the Salafi movement was illegal throughout the country.

=== Legal and policy framework ===
Tajikistan's constitution provides for freedom of religion, and the government generally respects this right in practice; however, the government monitors the activities of religious institutions to keep them from becoming overtly political or espousing "extremist tendencies," and some local administrative offices have interpreted the term "secular state" to require a government bias against religion.

The Law of the Republic of Tajikistan "On Religion and Religious Organizations" was established December 1, 1994, and amended in 1997. The law provides the right of individuals to choose and change their religion and practice their religion of choice. The law also protects the right of individuals to proselytize. The law protects religious freedom, but in practice the government, including the Tajikistan justice system, does not always rigorously enforce the law in a nondiscriminatory fashion.

Although there is no official state religion, Tajikistan recognizes two Islamic holy days, Eid Al Fitr and Idi Qurbon (Eid al-Adha), as state holidays.

According to the Law "On Religion and Religious Organizations," religious communities must be registered by the Department for Religious Affairs. In November 2006 the Government dissolved the State Committee on Religious Affairs (SCRA) and established the Department for Religious Affairs (DRA) within the Ministry of Culture. The former head of the SCRA is now a Deputy Minister at the Ministry of Culture. The official justification for registration is to ensure that religious groups act in accordance with the law; however, some religious groups alleged that the practical purpose is to ensure that they do not become overtly political. To register with the DRA, a national religious group must submit a charter, a list of at least 10 members, and evidence of local government approval of the location of a house of worship, if one exists. Religious groups are not required to have a physical structure in order to register, but they cannot hold regular meetings without one. Individual believers - up to 10 persons - do not have to register with the DRA in order to worship privately.

The DRA and local authorities share responsibility for the registration of neighborhood mosques and must agree on the physical location of a given mosque. The DRA is the primary authority for registration of non-Muslim groups; however, such groups must also register their place of worship with local officials. According to the DRA, local authorities may object to the registration of a place of worship only if the proposed structure does not meet sanitation or building codes, or if it is located on public land or immediately adjacent to government buildings, schools, or other places of worship. If the local government objects to a proposal, the religious community requesting permission must suggest an alternative. In the absence of registration, local authorities can force a place of worship to close, and fine its members.

There were no cases of the DRA permanently denying registration to religious groups in recent years. There were no reports of groups declining to apply for registration out of a belief that it would not be granted; however, the DRA rejected some applications on technical grounds, stalling registration. There were isolated cases of local government refusal to register religious groups in their areas, such as in the city of Tursonzade, where the DRA demanded local registration for a branch of the Jehovah's Witnesses in addition to their national registration.

The country has 2,842 registered mosques for daily prayers. This represents a decline from 2,885 registered mosques in 2006; however, the DRA claimed that it did not officially close any mosques during the reporting period. So-called "Friday mosques" (larger facilities built for weekly Friday prayers) must be registered with the DRA. There are 262 such mosques registered, not including Ismaili places of worship. Only one such mosque is authorized per 15,000 residents in a given geographic area. Many observers contend that this is discriminatory because no such rule exists for other religious groups.

There are 19 madrassahs at the college level, and one Islamic university. Tajikistan permits private religious schools, but they must be registered. In 2022, no madrassahs school-level operated in the country as they were not able to meet the Ministry of Education’s requirements.

The law does not prohibit parents teaching religious beliefs to their own children in the privacy of their homes, but restrictions exist that prohibit home-schooling children outside of the family. In 2022, the law criminalizes providing “unapproved religious education” (including online learning), with fines of up to US$5700 for providers, as well as fines for students. Students must also have government permission to study abroad.

President Rahmon continued to strongly defend "secularism," a politicized term that carries the strong connotation of being "anti-extremist" rather than "nonreligious." In national speeches the President cautioned against outsiders unfairly linking Islam to terrorism. While the vast majority of citizens consider themselves Muslim, there is a significant fear of Islamic extremism, both within the government and among the population at large.

A 1999 constitutional amendment permits religiously based political parties, although a 1998 law specifying that parties may not receive support from religious institutions remains in effect. Two representatives from a religiously oriented party, the Islamic Renaissance Party of Tajikistan (IRPT), were members in the lower house of the national Parliament; this party was then banned as an extremist organization.

An executive decree generally prohibits government publishing houses from publishing anything in Arabic script; however, some have done so in special cases if they presented the material for review prior to printing. They generally do not publish religious literature in general, but have done so on occasion, including producing copies of the Qur'an. There is no legal restriction on the distribution or possession of the Qur'an, the Bible, or other religious works; however, in practice the government restricts distribution of Christian literature. There are no reported restrictions on the religious-oriented press. The IRPT distributes four publications and an Iranian news agency broadcasts a weekly radio program.

The new draft religion law introduced by the SCRA in January 2006 was distributed domestically for review but had not been sent to Parliament. The law entitled "On Freedom of Conscience, on Religious Associations and Other [Religious] Organizations," would replace the current law on religion and add restrictions, such as increasing to 400 the number of petition signatures required to form a religious association; prohibiting religious education in private houses; prohibiting proselytizing; prohibiting religious associations from participating in political activities; and prohibiting political parties from having a religion-based ideology (which would effectively forbid the IRPT). On June 28, 2007 representatives of 22 minority religious groups, including Baháʼís, Catholics, Baptists, Seventh-Day Adventists, Lutherans, Pentecostals and other Protestant denominations, signed an open letter to the President and Parliament expressing concern that the draft law would effectively outlaw minority religious groups in the country.

The Tajikistan government issued a textbook to high schools in 2005 on the history of Islam, and a course on the history of religions is taught in public schools at the 10th grade level. Observers have interpreted such government-imposed instruction as a way of controlling religious indoctrination. President Rahmon also declared that the Islamic University would be funded by the state, and the curriculum would include science and math.

=== Restrictions on religious freedom ===
Each week, the government will approve a subject to be spoken on at Friday mosque services.

All religious organizations must register with the government. In May 2022, the Committee on Religion, Regulation of Traditions, Celebrations, and Ceremonies (CRA) announced that they will no longer register any new Christian churches.

Production and distribution of all religious literature must go through the CRA. In 2022, they approved about 40% of materials submitted to them. Any violation of this law is subject to fines of up to US$6700. Several bookshops were closed down in 2022.

The local government of Tursonzade continued to use administrative barriers to prevent the registration of a place of worship for the Jehovah's Witnesses, in spite of their national registration and DRA efforts on their behalf.

The DRA controls participation in the Hajj and imposes restrictions on pilgrims ("hajjis"). Tajikistan require air travel for the Hajj and controls local tour operators, citing hygiene and safety concerns as reasons for limiting other means of travel. Hajjis are required to register with the DRA and deposit $2,500 (8,625 Tajik Somoni) prior to departure. In 2007, the DRA apparently lifted the previous quota limit of 3,500 citizen hajjis; as a result, 4,622 citizens participated in the Hajj in 2007, compared with 3,450 in 2006 and 4,072 in 2005, out of the overall quota of 6,000 hajjis that the Saudis allocated. Since 2017, citizens must be at least 40 years old to carry out the pilgrimage.

Tajikistan continues to carry out "attestations" of imams, through which it tested all imams on their knowledge of Islamic teachings and religious principles. Imams could be dismissed if they did not pass the test. The government organized a seminar for Imam-Khatibs of Friday mosques in Dushanbe to teach them about the various sects of Islam.

A 2004 Council of Ulamo fatwa prohibiting women from praying in mosques remained in effect in 2023. The fatwa was generally observed; however, some women did pray in small mosques without consequence. The Council of Ulamo, an ostensibly nongovernmental body that monitors and standardizes Islamic teaching, justifies the fatwa by explaining that according to the country's historical tradition, women do not pray in mosques. Some considered the fatwa a political move inspired by the government under the guise of religious law to reduce the access women have to IRPT messages and their ability to pass religious teachings to their children. Some local officials forbade members of the IRPT to speak in local mosques; however, this restriction reflects political rather than religious differences.

In early 2007 the Minister of Education declared that in accordance with a new dress code for all public educational institutions, girls would not be permitted to wear the hijab. The new policy reinforced the Minister's 2005 statement banning the hijab, but the government maintained that this was neither official law nor policy. In practice, many female students and teachers were expelled from school for wearing the hijab; there has been no official government reaction to the ongoing expulsions.

There were no further reports of local government officials prohibiting Muslim women from having their photographs taken for an internal identification document while wearing the hijab. The DRA claimed that this occurred rarely and that it interceded with the identification agencies in each case to make an exception.

Law enforcement officials continue to remove children found attending mosques during the day. This action was taken after government officials declared that children should be studying in schools, not worshipping in mosques. Some citizens protested and in at least one incident stopped the militia from rounding up the children by blocking the police van. However, according to media reports, police were usually successful in rounding up the children.

Missionaries of registered religious groups are not restricted by law, and they continue to proselytize openly. Missionaries are not particularly welcome in some local communities, and some religious groups experience harassment in response to their evangelical activities. There have been no reports of visa restrictions for Muslim missionaries.

On July 13, 2006, Murodullo Davlatov, the former Chairman of the SCRA and now the Deputy Minister of Culture responsible for the DRA, stated publicly that the committee would scrutinize Jehovah's Witnesses actions. He said that Jehovah's Witnesses must receive permission from the committee prior to importing religious literature and provide samples of the literature to the committee. Beginning in April 2007 government authorities prohibited the release of religious literature imported by Jehovah's Witnesses. In a written statement presented to the Jehovah's Witnesses on June 15, 2007, the DRA stated that the literature has a negative impact on the country and recommended that authorities not release the literature.

The "ban" on printing in Arabic script was thought to be an attempt to prevent the publication of extremist literature, such as those of the extremist Islamic political organization Hizb ut-Tahrir.

Authorities in Isfara continue to restrict private Arabic language schools (including those giving private Islamic instruction) based on past reports that one such school was hosting a suspected terrorist. Restrictions on home-based Islamic education remain in place. While these restrictions are primarily due to political concerns, they affect religious instruction.

Unconfirmed reports suggest that the Tajikistan government has attempted to restrict the influence of two popular Islamic scholars by stopping Muslims from outside the scholar's districts from coming to their mosques to worship, barring them from becoming members of the IRPT. and confiscating audio and video cassettes of their sermons from public shops in 2006. The government continues to examine audio and video cassettes for extremist and anti-government material.

Tajikistan does not have a comprehensive strategy regarding refugees. A Christian refugee couple from Iran, an Iranian woman and an Afghan man, remain in Tajikistan while appealing a denial of resettlement. The country did not grant this couple full refugee status according to international standards. International organizations and local NGOs report that harassment of refugees on religious grounds is no longer as prevalent as it once was. Instead, religious refugees face the same problems as political refugees, such as: resolutions that limit areas where refugees can settle to those outside of major cities; prohibitions on the registration of refugees who passed through a third country on their way to Tajikistan; and inability to register their status in country for periods longer than six months

The Dushanbe city government filed charges against the Grace Sun Min Church and ordered a court hearing. The city government alleges that a piece of property owned by the church does not meet architectural standards. In 2001, the city government took the church to court in an attempt to seize the same building, claiming it belonged to the city. The church proved its ownership of the building and retained it.

On April 2, 2007, Dushanbe city government officials shut down a religious celebration of Jehovah's Witnesses that more than 1,000 people attended. The officials prohibited the group from organizing in large numbers without permission from the local government. Later in the same year, their government registration was cancelled.

In 2006, the land dispute over Dushanbe's only synagogue remained unresolved, and the partially destroyed building still functioned as a synagogue. Municipal officials partially tore down the synagogue, along with several mosques and administrative buildings, in February 2006, because it was in the middle of a planned park area. The city and Jewish community leaders were unable to reach a suitable compromise to relocate the synagogue or pursue an alternative solution. The city government offered land for a new synagogue but stated it could not provide compensation for the building, citing "separation of church and state." The synagogue was fully demolished in 2008. A standing building was repurposed as a synagogue and opened in May 2009.

=== Abuses of religious freedom ===
Tajikistan's government reported that 61 persons were detained and convicted as HT members in 2006. HT members can receive a sentence of up to 12 years in prison. Some speculated that the government used the HT label to arrest its opposition, including members of the intelligentsia and teachers.

Tajikistan temporarily detained and questioned members of various Christian denominations on several occasions before 2007. Government officials accused some Tajiks of betraying Islam after converting to Christianity. During the interrogations, government officials verbally harassed and threatened the Christians. On two separate occasions in April and May 2007, government officials allegedly beat a member of the Jehovah's Witnesses they had brought in for questioning.

In 2006, local authorities in Kairokkum from the Ministry of Interior, the prosecutor's office, and the State Committee on National Security temporarily detained and interrogated two Jehovah's Witnesses members for discussing the Bible with local citizens. The authorities verbally abused the members and threatened to rape and kill the members if they continued to preach in Kairokkum. After five hours of questioning the members were released. Authorities from the State Committee on National Security officially told the Jehovah's Witnesses organization that the members were detained because they lacked identification documents and permission from local authorities to preach in Kairokkum.

On December 6, 2006, the Khujand City Court convicted IRPT member Mukhtorjon Shodiev and sentenced him to nine months in prison for inciting violence and calling for an overthrow of the Tajikistan government. Shodiev and the IRPT argued that the charges were false and politically motivated.

On July 26, 2006, the Tursonzade City Court convicted and issued a fine to a member of the Jehovah's Witnesses for conducting religious education without a permit. The witness maintained that she was having a private Bible discussion with another adult in her home. The case rose to the Supreme Court, which upheld the city court's decision on September 13, 2006 and ordered the witness to pay a fine of $29 (100 Tajik Somonis).

On May 4, 2006 IRPT member Sadullo Marupov fell from the third story of a police station in Isfara, a town in the northern Sughd region known for its strong Islamic roots. Officials stated that Marupov had committed suicide; however, IRPT members refuted the official statement and claimed that police killed Marupov, and had tortured him during an earlier detention. Officials alleged Marupov was a member of Bay'at, a group the Government has labeled extremist, although some observers have questioned whether Bay'at even exists. The Government arrested three guards in connection with the case and subsequently released them with an administrative fine.

In contrast to previous years, more recently (up to 2007) there have been no reports of arrests of high-profile Muslims.

=== Improvements and Positive Developments in Respect for Religious Freedom ===
Gradually officials have suspended 2001 prohibitions on the use of loudspeakers by mosques issued by the mayor's office in Dushanbe. The prohibitions apparently were not based on any central directive. Dushanbe city authorities permitted mosques to use loudspeakers, provided the sound was directed towards the interior of the mosque. Mosques in the Sughd and Khatlon regions openly used loudspeakers directed away from the mosque for the daily call to prayer without facing prosecution.

During the reporting period, women were increasingly permitted to be photographed for official identification while wearing the hijab, particularly to participate on the Hajj. Some women were also able to attend mosque without being detained or prosecuted.

Tajikistan also relaxed the "ban" on printing in Arabic script by government publishing houses. The government permitted the printing of materials presented to the director of the publishing house, if submitted for review prior to printing, and deemed to be non-threatening.

=== Societal abuses and discrimination ===
Muslim leaders occasionally express the opinion that minority religious groups undermined national unity and complain that laws and regulations give preference to religious minorities. While most citizens consider themselves Muslim and most of the inhabitants are not anti-Islamic, there is a pervasive fear of Islamic extremism, felt both by the government and the general population. Some citizens, often including Tajikistan's government, interpret a secular state to mean a laical state that should be void of religious practices. Some minority groups reported incidents possibly related to religious discrimination.

On August 18 and September 14, 2006, unknown assailants threw Molotov cocktails at a synagogue in Dushanbe, setting parts of the building on fire. On September 14 the Russian Orthodox Church in Dushanbe also suffered a Molotov cocktail attack. The Ministry of Interior investigated the incidents, but the Government did not prosecute anyone.

The Rabbi of the Dushanbe synagogue reported a break-in at his home in August 2006. Unknown individuals broke into a local church on March 11, 2007. The respective religious groups suspect that the break-ins are related to the groups' religious beliefs, but the motive remains unknown. The Ministry of Interior investigated the case, but no suspects were arrested.

== In 2020s ==
The 2022 report of US government on religious freedom in Tajikistan raised concerns over the restrictions on participation of women and minors in religious services and restrictions on the religious education of youth. In 2024, the Tajik government passed a new law banning hijab declaring it a "foreign clothing"; children's celebrations of Eid al-Fitr and Eid al-Adha were also banned.

== See also ==
- Religion in Tajikistan
- Secularism in Tajikistan
- Human rights in Tajikistan
