= Municipalities of Tajikistan =

Municipalities of Tajikistan are the cities, town, and villages of Tajikistan, most of which are listed in the following pages:

- List of cities in Tajikistan (cities with more than 10,000 people in 2006)
- List of towns and villages in Tajikistan (municipalities with fewer than 10,000 people in 2006)
