= Politics of Tajikistan =

Politics of Tajikistan Сиёсати Тоҷикистон Siyosati Tojikiston
- Emblem of Tajikistan
- Polity type: Unitary presidential constitutional republic
- Constitution: Constitution of Tajikistan

Legislative branch
- Name: Supreme Assembly
- Type: Bicameral
- Meeting place: Dousti Square, Dushanbe
- Upper house
- Name: National Assembly of Tajikistan
- Presiding officer: Rustam Emomali, Chairman of the Majlisi Milli
- Appointer: Indirect elections, appointed by the President of the Republic
- Lower house
- Name: Assembly of Representatives
- Presiding officer: Fayzali Idizoda, Chairman of the Assembly of Representatives

Executive branch
- Head of state
- Title: President
- Currently: Emomali Rahmon
- Appointer: Direct popular vote
- Head of government
- Title: Prime Minister
- Currently: Qohir Rasulzoda
- Appointer: President
- Cabinet
- Name: Government of Tajikistan
- Current cabinet: Qohir Rasulzoda Cabinet
- Leader: Prime Minister
- Appointer: President
- Headquarters: Dousti Square, Dushanbe
- Ministries: 14

Judicial branch
- Name: Judiciary of Tajikistan
- Supreme Court
- Chief judge: Shermuhammad Shokhiyon
- Seat: Namat Karabaev Street, Dushanbe

The politics of Tajikistan nominally takes place in a framework of a presidential republic, whereby the President is both head of state and head of government, and of a multi-party system. (Note: Even though an executive president co-exists with a prime minister, multiple sources have still described Tajikistan as a presidential republic with the president serving as both head of state and head of government.) Legislative power is vested in both the executive branch and the two chambers of parliament.

In practice, Tajikistan is governed by President Emomali Rahmon who has headed an authoritarian regime with elements of a cult of personality since 1994. Political opponents are repressed, violations of human rights and freedoms are severe, elections are not free and fair, and corruption and nepotism are rampant. Various important government positions are occupied by his family members, such as his 37-year-old son Rustam Emomali, who is the chairman of the country's parliament and the mayor of its capital city, Dushanbe.

== Political background ==
The August 1991 putsch widened the rift. Frustrated by daily demonstrations in front of the Supreme Soviet and the erosion of the government's authority, the regime appeared to support the Moscow putschists. Qadriddin Aslonov, then the chairman of the Supreme Soviet of Tajikistan, went on record in defence of the (Soviet) status quo when complaining to a journalist of Izvestia that the country is falling into chaos. This statement encapsulated the feeling of the republican leadership. Support for the putschists exasperated the already galvanised intelligentsia. A flood of demonstrators blocked roads adjacent to the building of the Supreme Soviet and forced Qahhor Mahkamov to resign on 31 August 1991. Demonstrators, encouraged by the opposition parties but not entirely controlled by them, had far-reaching demands: the banning of the Communist party and the nationalization of its assets, the resignation of the entire government, the dissolution of the legislature and new elections.

During this turmoil Tajikistan declared its independence from Soviet Union, on September 9, 1991 and promptly fell into a civil war from 1992–1997 between old-guard regits, and Islamists loosely organized as the United Tajik Opposition (UTO). Other combatants and armed bands that flourished in this civil chaos simply reflected the breakdown of central authority rather than loyalty to a political faction. The height of hostilities occurred between 1992 and 1993. By 1997, the predominantly Kulyabi-led Tajik government and the UTO successfully negotiated a power-sharing peace accord and implemented it by 2000.

Tajikistan is slowly rebuilding itself with an integrated government and continues to permit a Russia military presence to guard their border with Afghanistan and the basing of the Russian 201st Motorized Rifle Division that never left Tajikistan when it became independent. Most of these Russian-led forces, however, are local Tajik non-commissioned officers and soldiers.

Both Tajikistan's presidential and parliamentary elections, in 1999 and 2000, respectively, were widely considered to be flawed and unfair but peaceful. The inclusion of an Islamist party committed to secular government (Islamic Renaissance Party) and several other parties in the Parliamentary elections represented an improvement in the Tajik people's right to choose their government. Tajikistan is the only Central Asian country in which a religiously affiliated political party is represented in Parliament. President Emomali Rahmon, while no longer specifically obliged—as he was under the peace accords—to allocate one-third of government positions to the UTO, has kept some former UTO officials in senior cabinet-level positions. While the government and the now incorporated former opposition continue to distrust each other, they have often found a way to work with each other and are committed to peacefully resolving their differences.

Prior to the overthrow of the Taliban in 2001, the civil war in Afghanistan produced cross-border effects that threatened to destabilize Tajikistan's fragile and hard-won peace. In the summers of 1999 and 2000, the Islamic Movement of Uzbekistan used Tajikistan as a staging ground for an insurgency campaign against the government of Uzbekistan. At the same time, Taliban advances in northern Afghanistan threatened to inundate Tajikistan with thousands of refugees. A constant flow of illegal narcotics continues to transit Tajikistan from Afghanistan on its way to Russian and European markets, leaving widespread violent crime, corruption, increased HIV incidence, and economic distortions in its wake. During 2002, stability in the country continued to increase, and the year was largely free of the assassinations and outbreaks of violence perpetrated by unreformed opposition members that plagued the country in previous years.

== Executive branch ==
The sections that follow incorporate text from the Library of Congress Country Study: Tajikistan Country Profile (January 2007), which is a United States government publication in the public domain.

Main office-holders
Office	Name	Party	Since
President	Emomali Rahmon	People's Democratic Party of Tajikistan	16 November 1994
Prime Minister	Qohir Rasulzoda	People's Democratic Party of Tajikistan	23 November 2013

The president of Tajikistan, who is directly elected, is both the head of state and the head of government. The president appoints the prime minister and all the members of the government, without the need of parliamentary approval. Tajikistan is thus a presidential republic. Tajikistan held a constitutional referendum on 22 June 2003 and the 2003 Constitution, among other amendments, set a limit of two seven-year terms for the president. Emomali Rahmon's election to the office of the president in 2006 counts as his first 7-year term under the 2003 Constitution, and was re-elected for a second term in 2013, remaining in office until 2020. Rahmon holds the title of 'Leader of the Nation' and is therefore exempt from presidential term limits. This title also grants him and his family legal immunity.

In this geographically divided country, the ceremonial position of prime minister traditionally is held by a person from the north to nominally balance President Emomali Rahmon’s southern origin. In 2004 the executive branch fell further under the control of the governing party as appointments by Rahmon left the opposition with only 5 percent of major government positions. This event followed the expiration of the 1997 peace guarantee that the United Tajik Opposition (UTO) would occupy at least 30 percent of top government positions. Prior to the 2006 election, the Government of Tajikistan, which executes the decisions of the president, included two deputy prime ministers, 19 ministers, nine committee heads, and several ex officio members. After the election, Rahmon abolished 10 ministries and five state committees and reappointed Oqil Oqilov as prime minister. Rahmon is said to have accumulated substantial informal power through patronage.

In October 2020, Tajikistan's authoritarian President Emomali Rahmon was reelected for a fifth term with nearly 91 percent of the vote, following a tightly controlled and largely ceremonial election.

== Legislative branch ==
The bicameral Supreme Assembly (Majlisi Oli) includes the 63-seat Assembly of Representatives (Majlisi namoyandagon), which meets year-round (from November through end of June), and the 33-seat National Assembly (Majlisi milli), which meets at least twice per year. The bicameral legislature was introduced in the September 1999 Constitution and prior to that Tajikistan had a unicameral legislature.

The members of the Assembly of Representatives are chosen by direct popular election for a five-year term. Of the 63 members of the Assembly of Representatives, 22 are elected by party, in proportion to the number of votes received by each party gaining at least 5 percent of total votes, and the remaining members are elected from single-member constituencies.

In the National Assembly, three-fourths of the members are chosen by the deputies of the local representative assemblies (majlisi) in the country's four main administrative divisions and in the cities subordinated directly to central government; each of these subnational jurisdictions is entitled to equal representation. The remaining members are appointed directly by the president.

The pro-government People’s Democratic Party continued to control both houses of the parliament after the elections of 2005; that party gained 52 of the 63 seats in the Assembly of Representatives. In 2006, 11 women sat in the Assembly of Representatives, and five sat in the National Assembly. Opposition factions in the Supreme Assembly have clashed with pro-government members over some issues.

== Judicial branch ==
The constitution provides for an independent judiciary. The Supreme Court is the highest court. Other high courts include the Supreme Economic Court and the Constitutional Court, which decides questions of constitutionality. The president appoints the judges of these three courts, with the approval of the legislature. There is also a Military Court. The judges of all courts are appointed to 10-year terms.

Though the judiciary is nominally independent, the executive branch and criminal groups have considerable influence on judicial functions. Bribery of judges, who are poorly paid and poorly trained, is commonplace. The court system has local, district, regional, and national levels, with each higher court serving as an appellate court for the level below. Appeals of court decisions are rare because the populace generally does not trust the judicial system. Constitutional guarantees to the right to an attorney and to a prompt and public trial often are ignored. The Soviet-era presumption of the guilt of the defendant remains in force. The procurator’s office conducts all criminal investigations. Trials are heard by juries except in cases of national security.

The Republic Bar Association (also called the Bar Association of the Republic of Tajikistan) gained its independence in 1995. Yet, according to a source, it was not until 1998 that "the concept of a lawyer-attorney was introduced [in Tajikistan], being defined as a business person providing legal services on the basis of a license issued by the Ministry of Justice." While there is evidence of female lawyers on account of the League of Women Lawyers of Tajikistan's existence, there is no indication as to how women have fared in the legal field once the country declared its independence from the Soviet Union in 1991.

== Administrative divisions ==
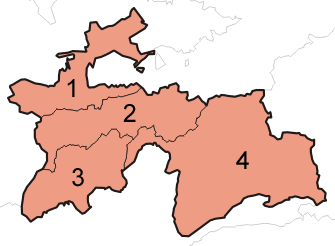

Tajikistan consists of 4 administrative divisions. These are the provinces (viloyat) of Sughd and Khatlon, the autonomous province (viloyati mukhtor) of Gorno-Badakhshan (in Tajik: Viloyati Mukhtori Kuhistoni Badakhshon), and the Region of Republican Subordination (Raiony Respublikanskogo Podchineniya in transliteration from Russian or in Tajik: Ноҳияҳои тобеи ҷумҳурӣ; formerly known as Karotegin Province). The capital of Sughd is Khujand (formerly Leninabad), the capital of Khatlon is Bokhtar (formerly Qurghonteppa), and the capital of Gorno-Badakhshan is Khorugh (formerly Khorog). The national capital Dushanbe is also the administrative center of the Region of Republican Subordination. Each region is divided into several districts (Tajik: ноҳия, nohiya or raion), which in turn are subdivided into jamoats (village-level self-governing units). As of 2008, there were 58 districts and 367 jamoats in Tajikistan. In addition, subregional units included 17 towns and 54 urban-type settlements (Tajik: шаҳрак).

== Provincial and local government ==
Local government is divided into representative and executive branches. The representative branch in provinces, towns, and districts is the assembly (majlis) of people's deputies, who are elected locally for a five-year term. The executive power in provinces, towns, and districts is vested in the head of local administration, who is directly appointed by the President, with the approval of the local majlis.

== Electoral system ==
Suffrage is universal for citizens 18 years of age and older. A new election law passed in 2004 has received international criticism for its restrictive candidate registration requirements. Election requires an absolute majority of votes; if no candidate gains a majority, a second round is held between the top two vote getters. By controlling the Central Election Commission, the Rahmon regime has gained substantial influence over the registration of parties, the holding of referendums, and election procedures. In 1999 and 2003, referendums of dubious fairness made constitutional changes that strengthened Rahmon's hold on power. International observers also found substantial irregularities in the conduct of the 1999 presidential election, in which only one opposition candidate was permitted to register, and the media were censored. Six parties participated in the 2000 and 2005 parliamentary elections, although in both cases observers reported state interference with the process and with opposition candidates' access to the media. Rahmon easily won re-election in November 2006, gaining 79 percent of the vote against four little-known opponents; international monitors again found the election unfair. Three major opposition parties—the Democratic Party, the Islamic Renaissance Party, and the Social Democratic Party—boycotted the election.

== Political parties ==
In the early 2000s, independent political parties continued to exist, but their operations were circumscribed and their influence marginal. The governing People’s Democratic Party (PDP) gained strength as some opposition party leaders joined the government and others were disqualified from participation in elections. The Communist Party of Tajikistan, a nominal opposition party that has supported President Rahmon on most issues, has lost support since 2000. The liberal, pro-market Democratic Party also has lost support. In 1997 Rahmon weakened his chief opposition emerging from the civil war, the United Tajik Opposition (UTO), by naming movement leader Akbar Turajonzoda a deputy prime minister. In the ensuing years, the UTO was eclipsed politically by its main component organization, the Islamic Renaissance Party (IRP). In 2003 the IRP lost its chief opposition issue as the ban on religious parties ended. Nevertheless, in 2006 parties still could not receive aid from religious institutions, and tension remained between the government and Islamic factions. In 2006 the IRP was the most influential opposition party in Tajikistan and the only religiously affiliated party represented in the national legislature of a Central Asian country. After the death of long-time IRP leader Said Abdullo Nuri in 2006, a possible split emerged from the struggle for party leadership. Some antigovernment sentiment has been channeled into radical Islamic organizations such as Hizb ut-Tahrir, which is outlawed as a terrorist organization, rather than into conventional political parties. In 2006 six parties, including one faction of the Democratic Party, were banned, and a total of eight parties were registered. In 2005 Mahmadruzi Iskandarov, head of the Democratic Party, received a long prison term for terrorism after being abducted from exile, and in 2006 his party was replaced on the official list by a government-backed splinter group, Vatan.

== Tajiks in Uzbekistan ==
In recent years, some Tajiks in eastern Uzbekistan (especially Samarkand and Bukhara and the surrounding areas) have called to join Tajikistan. Tajiks are a main minority in Uzbekistan, and historically Tajiks lived in a larger area in Central Asia than now.

== International organization participation ==
AsDB, CCC, CIS, EAPC, EBRD, ECE, ECO, ESCAP, FAO, IBRD, ICAO, ICC, ICRM, IDA, IDB, IFAD, IFC, IFRCS, ILO, IMF, Intelsat, IOC, IOM, ITU, OIC, OPCW, OSCE, UN, UNCTAD, UNESCO, UNIDO, UPU, WFTU, WHO, WIPO, WMO, WTrO (observer)

== See also ==
- Timeline of Tajikistani history
- Bibliography of Tajikistani history
- Outline of Tajikistan
