= List of towns and villages in Tajikistan =

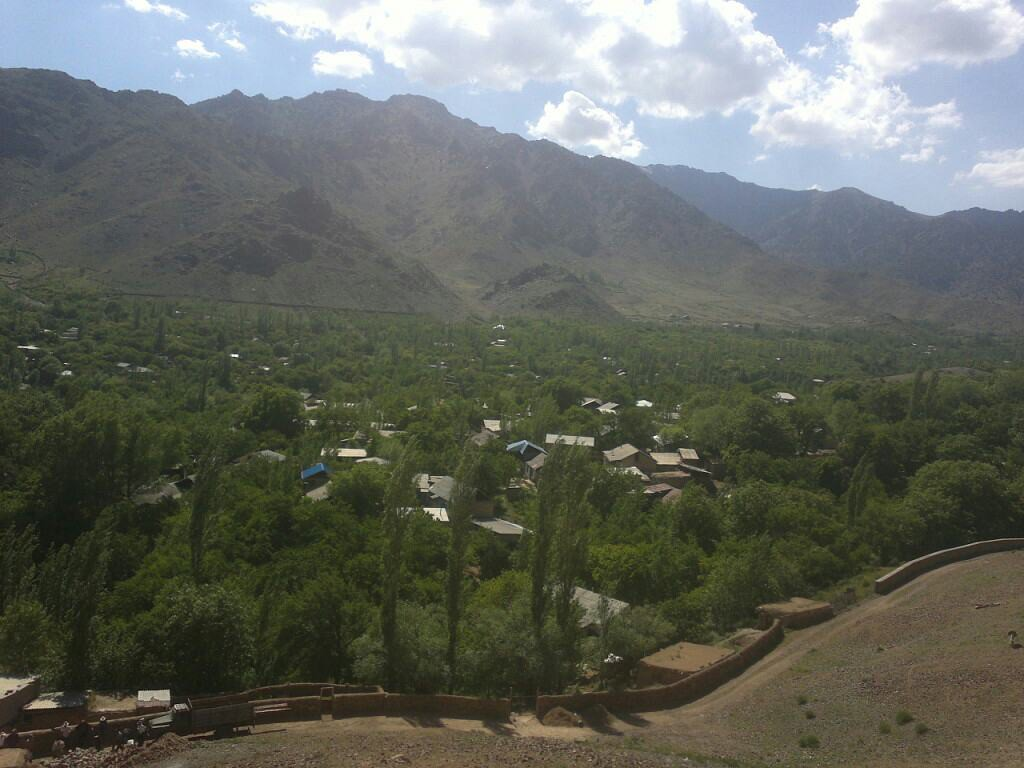
The village of Mullomir, Tajikistan

This is a list of towns and villages in Tajikistan. Cities with a population greater than 10,000 can be found at the list of cities in Tajikistan.

== A ==
- Abdusamad
- Alga
- Alichur
- Alowmayn
- Amondara
- Andarsoy
- Anzob
- Arabkishlak
- Artuch
- Askalon
- Ayni, Ayni District
- Ayni, Varzob District

Top of page

== B ==
- Bahori
- Baljuvon
- Basmanda
- Bedak
- Bidev
- Bobodarkhon
- Bobotago
- Bodomzor
- Boghiston
- Bogikalon
- Bokhtariyon
- Boshtol
- Bostondeh
- Bozorboy Burunov
- Bulok
- Buston
- Bustonqala

Top of page

== C ==
- Chashma
- Chashmasor, Fayzobod District
- Chashmasor, Ghafurov District
- Chashmasor, Shahriston District
- Childara
- Chimqal'a
- Chinor
- Cholota
- Chorbogh
- Chore
- Chorqishloq
- Chorsu, Lakhsh District
- Chorsu, Vahdat
- Choruqdayrron
- Chukkat

Top of page

== D ==
- Dadoboy Kholmatov
- Dahana, Asht District
- Dahana, Yaghnob
- Dahyak
- Dakhkat
- Darband
- Dardar
- Darg
- Darshai
- Dashti Amin
- Dashti-Jum
- Dashtiqozy
- Dehbaland
- Dehhisor
- Dehkalon
- Dehmalik
- Dehmanora
- Dehmoy
- Dehqonariq
- Dizhik
- Dombrachi
- Dulona
- Dumzoy
- Duvana

Top of page

== E ==
- Esizi Poyon

Top of page

== F ==
- Farkhor
- Farkov
- Farob
- Fatmev
- Fatmovut
- Fayzobod
- Filmandar
- Firdavsi
- Fondaryo

Top of page

== G ==
- Galaba
- Ganji Nihon
- Gazantarak
- Gaznich
- Gazza
- Gharm
- Gharmayn
- Ghezani Bolo
- Ghezani-Poyon
- Ghonchi
- Ghulakandoz
- Gizhdarva
- Gudos
- Guliston
- Gulshan
- Gusar
- Guytan
- Guzaribad

Top of page

== H ==
- Hadishahr
- Hakimi
- Hayoti Nav
- Hazora
- Hijborak
- Hoit
- Homid Aliev

Top of page

== I ==
- Iftikhor
- Ishkoshim
- Iskodar
- Ismoili Somoni
- Ismoili Somoni, Sughd
- Ispan
- Istiqlol, Devashtich District
- Istiqlol, Shahriston District
- Izzatullo Halimov

Top of page

== J ==
- Jafr
- Jangal
- Javkandak
- Jilav
- Jilikul
- Jomchashma
- Jomi
- Jura Rahmonov

Top of page

== K ==
- Kalai Surkh
- Kalanak
- Kalon
- Kamar
- Kamar-Tash
- Kanchoch
- Kansi
- Kante
- Kanyshbek
- Kashi
- Kashot
- Kattasarqamish
- Kevron
- Khalifa Hassan
- Khayrobod, Ayni District
- Khayrobod, Kuhistoni Mastchoh District
- Khayronbed
- Khishortob
- Khistevarz
- Khoja Tohir
- Khonabad
- Khovaling
- Khudgifi Bolo
- Khumdon
- Khurmi
- Khurramobod, Tajikistan
- Khurramzamin
- Khushikat
- Kiblai
- Kiryonti
- Kishtudak
- Konsoy
- Korez
- Kuhi
- Kuhsor
- Kuloli
- Kumarg
- Kurush

Top of page

== L ==
- Lakhsh
- Lakkon
- Langarishoh
- Lohur, Danghara District
- Lohuti
- Lolazor, Danghara District
- Lolazor, Devashtich District
- Lolazor, Jabbor Rasulov District
- Luchob

Top of page

== M ==
- Marghtumayn
- Mehnatobod
- Mehrobod, Asht District
- Mehrobod, Fayzobod District
- Mirzo Tursunzoda
- Mujiharf
- Muk
- Muksu
- Mullomir
- Murghob
- Mushtif

Top of page

== N ==
- Navbahor
- Navdi
- Navdonak
- Navkat
- Navobod, Istaravshan
- Navobod, Panjakent
- Navobod, Rasht District
- Nijoni
- Nofaroj
- Nomitkon
- Nurafshon, town
- Nurafshon, village
- Nushor
- Nusratullo Makhsum

Top of page

== O ==
- Obi Mehnat
- Obigarm
- Obikiik
- Oboddara
- Obodi
- Obshoron
- Oftobruy
- Ozodagon

Top of page

== P ==
- Padipast
- Pakhtaobod
- Paldorak
- Panj
- Panji Poyon
- Panjob
- Panjrud
- Petif
- Pildon
- Piniyon
- Piskon
- Ponghoz
- Porshinev
- Pulraut
- Punuk
- Pushing

Top of page

== Q ==
- Qadamjo
- Qadiob
- Qal'acha
- Qalaibaland
- Qalaidasht
- Qal'ai Khumb
- Qalailabiob
- Qal'ai Mirzoboy
- Qaroqazon
- Qubodiyon
- Qul

Top of page

== R ==
- Rabot
- Rahimzoda
- Rarz
- Ravshan
- Revad
- Roghun
- Romit
- Roshorv
- Roshtqal'a
- Rosrovut
- Rudaki
- Rushon

Top of page

== S ==
- Safar Amirshoev
- Safedchashma
- Sangtuda
- Sangvor
- Sarazm
- Sarband
- Sargoy
- Sarikhosor
- Sarvan
- Sarvati Istiqlol
- Sayf Rahim
- Sebiston
- Sebzor
- Seshanbe
- Shahrinav
- Shakhsara
- Shamsobod
- Shamtuch
- Sharora
- Sharshara
- Shaydon
- Shing
- Shirinchashma
- Shogadoev
- Showeta
- Shurab
- Shuroobod
- Sicharogh
- Simich
- Simiganj
- Sirdaryo
- Sohibnazar
- Sokan
- Sokidara
- 10-Solagii Istiqloliyat
- 20-Solagii Istiqloliyati Tojikiston
- Sughdiyona
- Sujina
- Sultonobod
- Surkh
- Surkhob

Top of page

== T ==
- Tagichinor
- Tagob
- Tagoba
- Takhtialif
- Tavildara
- Turdiev
- Tursunzoda

Top of page

== U ==
- Ustanak
- Ustung
- Utkansu
- Utogar

Top of page

== V ==
- Vagashton
- Vahdat, Gorno-Badakhshan
- Vahdat, Shahriston District
- Vakhsh, Jayhun District
- Vanj
- Varsaut
- Varzob
- Varzobqala
- Vashan
- Vashgird
- Ven
- Veshab
- Veshist
- Veshkand
- Vodif
- Vogat
- Voru
- Vota

Top of page

== W ==
- Waghinzoy
- Witikhon

Top of page

== Y ==
- Yakhtan
- Yakkakhona
- Yakkatol
- Yasman
- Yertula
- Yori
- Yova
- Yovon
- Yozghand

Top of page

== Z ==
- Zafar
- Zamchorroha
- Zarafshan
- Zarchasma
- Zarhok
- Zarrinrud
- Zarzamin
- Zasun
- Zavron
- Zebon
- Zerobod
- Zideh
- Zimare
- Zimtut
- Zindakon

Top of page
