= Yaghnob Valley =

Valley of the Yaghnob river in north western Tajikistan

- Дараи Яғноб, Яғнобдара
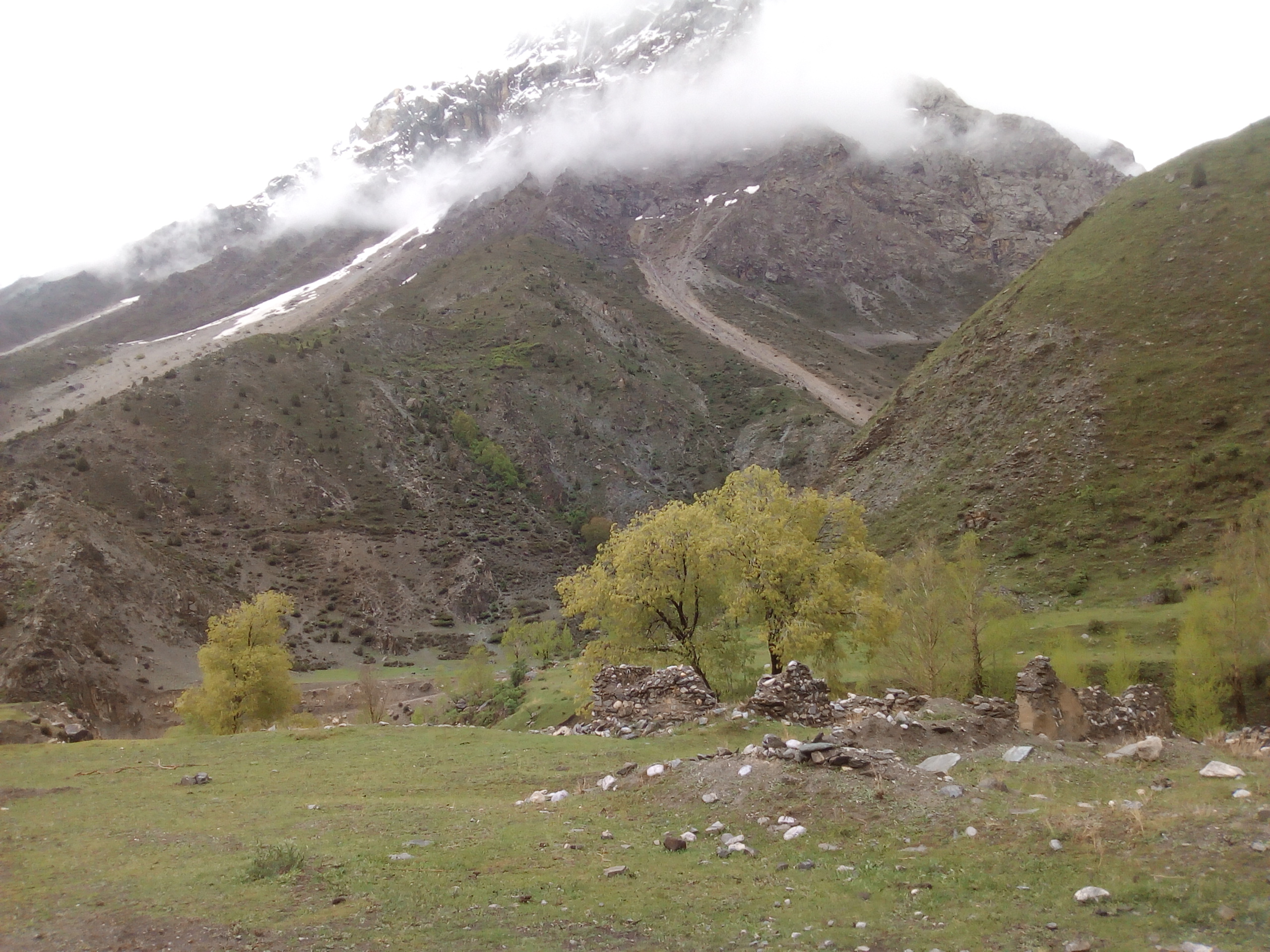

Geography
- Location: Sughd, Tajikistan
- Coordinates: 39.2°N 69.0°E
- Interactive map of Yaghnob Valley

The Yaghnob Valley is a valley in north-west Tajikistan, between the southern slope of the Zarafshan Range and the northern slope of the Gissar Range.

The valley is formed by the Yaghnob River and belongs to the Zarafshan basin. It lies between 2,500 and 3,000 metres above sea level and is virtually inaccessible for six months of the year.

The valley is home to the Yaghnobi people, a people directly descended from the ancient Sogdian civilization of Central Asia. Due to its natural isolation and limited infrastructure access, the people of Yaghnob Valley have been able to preserve their distinct lifestyle, culture and language, Yaghnobi, which is closely related to ancient Sogdian. Pre-Islamic beliefs and customs are still found in the valley today. Currently, the valley comprises approximately ten settlements, each housing between three and eight families.

== Western exploration ==
Topographers and Russian military expeditions have been visiting the Yaghnob Valley since the 1820s. In the 1870s General Abramov of Russia led the first scientific expedition to the Yaghnob Valley. The so-called “Mystery of Yaghnob” was introduced to the world by the German scientist G. Capus in 1883 in his article Yaghnob Valley and its People, published in the European Journal of Geography. The author highlighted the unique nature of this valley, the language of its people and the need for further research.

However, the valley has only really become the focus of public attention in the last 17 years, with a number of expeditions, as well as national and international publications, dedicated to the Yaghnob Valley. In 1990, after the Glasnost reforms, it became possible for the Tajik Cultural Fund to organize expeditions and the historian Oleg Panfilov published articles on the valley.

The subsequent period of Civil war in Tajikistan put further field research by international researchers on hold, though some Russian scientists were still able to continue their research. In the early 90s, the Mountain Geo-system Research Lab of the Institute of Geography at the Russian Academy of Science, with support from the private sector, the Soros Foundation and the Tajik Social and Ecological Union, was actively engaged in field research in the valley. In 2001 Alexei Gunya presented the findings in his book, Yagnob Valley – nature, history, and chances of a mountain community development in Tajikistan, which presented the most complete history of the valley, its agricultural practices and topography.

== History ==
Early history

The valley's first permanent settlements date back to the 8th century. The population was made up of Sogdians, fleeing the armies of the Arab Caliphate, who swept through Central Asia. The ancient Sogdians, and their direct descendants, the Yaghnobi, continued to live for centuries in splendid isolation in their remote valley home, surviving the successive waves of invaders that destroyed the surrounding areas.

The Soviet Years

The Yaghnob Valley faced major challenges in the 1970s, when its entire population was forcibly removed and resettled in the Zafarabad region. However, the links to the valley were not entirely destroyed, as some Yaghnobi farmers continued to graze their herds in the valley, and maintained the cemeteries and sacred places.

Recent history

A slow renaissance of the valley began at the end of the 1980s when some Yaghnobi families returned to their ancestral homes. In 1990, the Leninabad Provincial Executive Committee issued a decree which authorized limited government assistance to the returning Yaghnobis. Some state funds were allocated, and a new road was built between Margib and Khishortob.

During the time of Perestroika, the Yaghnobi people were able to return to their native land. However, since then the government has largely ignored this issue and has made little effort to restore the necessary socio-economic conditions for durable life in the valley or otherwise redress the wrongs inflicted on this community. The government, and other institutions, have sought to uncover the roots of the Tajik people in the Persian Empire and in other ancient civilizations, but have studiously ignored the place of the Yaghnob Valley, its people and its language in the history of this land.

== Current developments ==
The residents of the Yaghnob Valley had to pool their own resources to build a road up to Bedef village. However, this road is deteriorating as there are no more funds available for maintenance work. The valley is still effectively isolated for more than six months of the year and the people have little access to the outside world and, in particular, to emergency health services.

Recently, a brand new road has at last been built, leading to the very heart of the valley. However, as in many similar cases, this has turned out to have mixed blessings. On the one hand, it has indeed improved access to the outside world, but - likewise - it has equally improved the access of the outside world to the valley and increasing numbers of outsiders, with greater financial resources, have been attracted to exploit the economic potential of the valley.

The current population of the valley is about 492 people (82 families) according to 2008 census, but the population fluctuates according to season. Nevertheless, the overall trend appears downwards, as the younger people seem less inclined to remain in the valley, due to the paucity of health and educational facilities available locally.

Proposed Yaghnob Protected Area

In 1989-1992, Anvar J. Buzurukov (as the head of the Protected Areas Department of the Ministry of the Environment) initiated, planned and led scientific feasibility studies towards establishing the first national and natural parks in the Tajik SSR. In 1992, the biggest high mountain park in USSR-Pamir National Park was designated, now called the Tajik National Park, a year before the same team established the first nature reserve in Tajikistan, the Shirkent Nature Park). In addition, Anvar Buzurukov and his team with the first environmental non-governmental organization in Tajikistan, the Tajik Social and Ecological Union (TSEU), formed with support from the Ayni district authorities, in 1991 began the development of a technical proposal towards developing a protected area in the Yaghnob Valley, for both the natural environment and for the indigenous people. Unfortunately, the civil war of 1992-97 put these plans on hold.

In 2007 A.J. Buzurukov, as founder of the TSEU, planned and organized a multidisciplinary expedition to the Yaghnob Valley, with the support of the Ayni Development Committee, the UNDP's Ayni Regional Office and the UK government. Together with independent researchers, the expedition attempted to renew the initiatives to save and protect the valley's natural environment and the lifestyles and the language of its people. They prepared a report entitled, A brief scientific feasibility study, with proposed pre-project activities, for establishing the Yaghnob Natural Ethnography Park (YNEP). (downloadable on www.yagnob.org)

Advocates have long called for a special status to be given to the valley and the Yaghnobi language. One solution would be to create the YNEP, which would be the first such in the northern region of Tajikistan. It would protect the valley from any increase in environmentally-damaging activities, such as overgrazing, but would support sustainable and responsible tourism. Plans for the YNEP were discussed and approved during the first international scientific conference on environmental and developmental issues in the Yaghnob Valley: Ancient Sogdiana: Past, Present and Future, which took place on the 18–19 October 2007 in Dushanbe in Tajikistan.

The conference delegates formulated an appeal to the government and citizens of Tajikistan, and also to international organizations, for support in the establishment of the Yaghnob Natural Ethnography Park and for help in the sustainable and responsible development of the Yaghnob Valley, including improvements in the infrastructure. The conference concluded that the priority was to improve the living conditions of the Yaghnobi people and the quality of their lives. The Yaghnobi community, for its part, needed to play a more active role and become involved in all the subsequent initiatives, learning how to plan and implement the development projects themselves.

== Yaghnobi villages ==
The Yaghnobi villages were divided into 3 districts (or, in Yaghnobi, sada):

Lower District: Khishortob‡, Farkow†, Pushoytamen†, Worsowut†, Quli Worsowut†;

Middle District: Marghtumayn, Mushtif†, Alowmayn†, Waghinzoy, Shakhsara†, Showeta, Dumzoy†, Khisoki Darv†, Nomitkon, Chukkat†, Bidev, Kashi, Pulla Rowut, Tag-i Chanor, Pitip†;

Upper District: Upper Gharmen, Lower Gharmen, Simich†, Sokan, Dahana†, Qul, Piskon, Padipast, Nodmayn†, Dehbaland, Witikhon†, Tagob†, Kansi†, Kiryonti‡, Dehkalon†‡, Navobod†‡.

Note: † indicates an abandoned village, and ‡ indicates a Tajik-speaking village.
