= Yaghnob =

Yaghnob, or Yaghnobi, may refer to:

- Yaghnob (river) in Tajikistan;
- Yaghnob Valley, a valley in Tajikistan where the Yaghnob River flows;
- Yaghnobi language, spoken in Tajikistan;
- Yaghnobi people of Tajikistan.
