= Yaghnobis =

Iranian ethnic group

Yaghnobi
yaγnōbī́t, яғнобиҳо
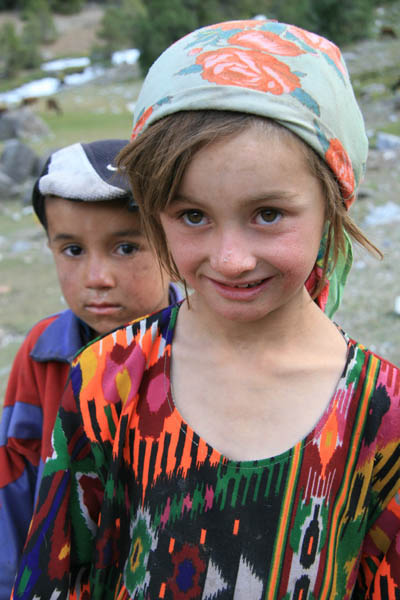
- Yaghnobi children

Total population
- c. 25,000

Regions with significant populations
- Valleys around Yaghnob, Qul and Varzob Rivers, Zafarobod District and elsewhere in Tajikistan

Languages
- Yaghnobi, Tajik (Variety of Persian)

Religion
- Sunni Islam

Related ethnic groups
- Other Iranian peoples

The Yaghnobi (Yaghnobi: yaγnōbī́t or suγdī́t; Tajik: яғнобиҳо, yağnobiho/jaƣnoʙiho) are an Eastern Iranian people residing in Tajikistan's Sughd region, specifically in the valleys of the Yaghnob, Qul, and Varzob rivers.

Yaghnobi is spoken in the upper valley of the Yaghnob River in the Zarafshan area of Tajikistan by the Yaghnobi people, and is also taught in some schools. It is considered to be a direct descendant of Sogdian and has often been called Neo-Sogdian in academic literature. The Yaghnobi are considered to be descendants of the Sogdian-speaking peoples who once inhabited most of Central Asia beyond the Amu Darya River in what was ancient Sogdia.

The 1926 and 1939 census data give the number of Yaghnobi language speakers as approximately 1,800. In 1955, M. Bogolyubov estimated the number of Yaghnobi native speakers as more than 2,000. In 1972, A. Khromov estimated 1,509 native speakers in the Yaghnob valley and about 900 elsewhere. The estimated number of Yaghnobis is approximately 25,000.

== History ==
=== Antiquity ===
Their traditional occupations were in agriculture, growing produce such as barley, wheat, and legumes as well as breeding cattle, oxen and asses. There were traditional handicrafts, such as weaving, which men mostly did. The women worked on moulding earthenware crockery.

The Yaghnobi people originated from the Sogdians, a people dominant in the area until the Muslim conquests in the 8th century. In that period, Yaghnobis settled in the high valleys.

=== Pre-20th century ===
The ancient Sogdians fled to the Yaghnob Valley to escape the Abbasid Caliphate. Their direct descendants, the Yaghnobi, lived there in peaceful isolation until the 1820s.

=== 20th century ===
Until the 20th century, the Yaghnobis lived through their natural economy. Some still do, as the area they originally inhabited is still remote from roads and power transmission lines. The first contact with Soviet Union in the 1930s during the Great Purge led to many Yaghnobis being exiled, but perhaps the most traumatic events were the forced resettlement in 1957 and 1970, from the Yaghnob mountains to the semi-desert lowlands of Tajikistan.

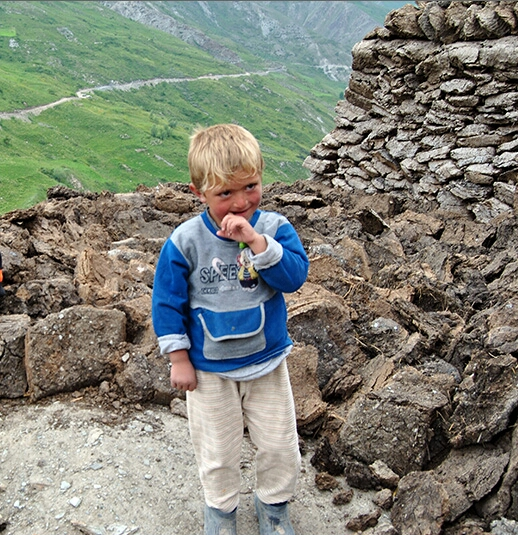
Yaghnobi boy in Ayni, Tajikistan

In the 1970s, Red Army helicopters were sent to valleys to evacuate the population, ostensibly because Yaghnobi kishlaks (villages) were considered at risk from avalanches. Some Yaghnobis reportedly died of shock in helicopters as they were moved to the plains. Many were then forced to work at cotton plantations on the plains. As a result of overwork and the change in environment and lifestyle, several hundred Yaghnobis died of disease. While some Yaghnobis rebelled and returned to the mountains, the Soviet government demolished the empty villages and the largest village on the Yaghnob River, Piskon, was removed from official maps.

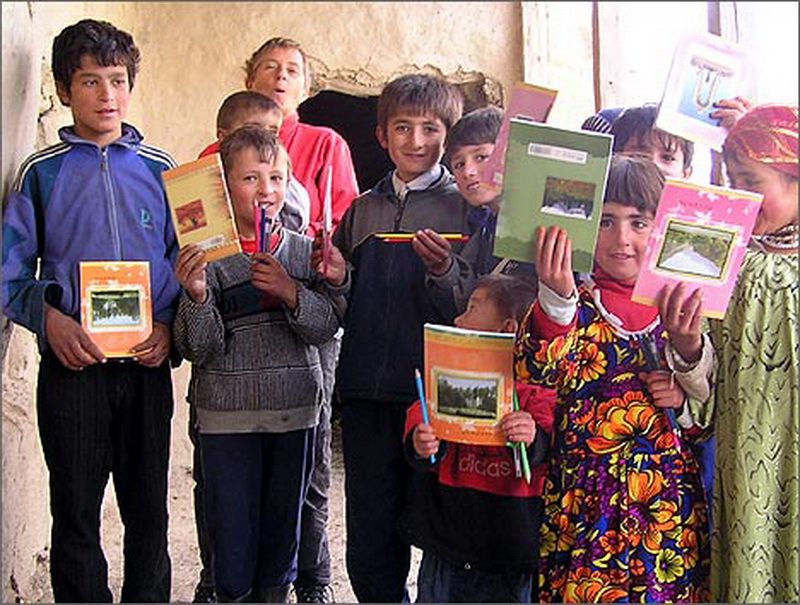
A group of Yaghnobi-speaking schoolchildren from Tajikistan

Since 1983, families have begun to return to the Yaghnob Valley. The majority of those that remain on the plains tend to be assimilated with the Tajiks, as their children study in school in the Tajik language. The returnees live through the natural economy, and the majority remain without roads and electricity.

=== 21st century ===
The Yaghnob Valley comprises approximately ten settlements, each housing between three and eight families. There are other small settlements elsewhere. The upper Yaghnob River Valley was protected by an until recently almost impenetrable gorge. They also live in and about the Amu Darya River, the Yaghnob River, the Yaghnob Valley, the Qul River, the Varzob rivers and the town of Anzob.

== Religion ==
The Yaghnobi people are Sunni Muslims. Many elements of the pre-Islamic Iranian religion of Zoroastrianism are still preserved.

== Genetics ==
=== Haplogroups ===
Y-DNA

The main paternal haplogroups of Yaghnobis are R1-M173 and J2-M172, both found at a frequency of around 32%. The second most common haplogroup is R1a1a-M17 at around 16%. The third most common haplogroup is L-M20, at a rate of approximately 10%. Other haplogroups include C-M130, K-M9 and P-M45, each at 3%.

mtDNA

=== Autosomal DNA ===
The Yaghnobi are genetically more similar to "present-day western Eurasian populations and Iranians". They display high genetic affinities to Iron Age Central Asians. Genetic data further indicates that Yaghnobis "have been isolated for a long time with no evidence of recent admixture". Yaghnobis derive around 93% of their ancestry from historical Indo-Iranian sources (represented by an Iron Age sample from Turkmenistan and Tajikistan) and around 7% from Baikal EBA groups (a population with 80-95% Ancient Northeast Asian and 5-20% Ancient North Eurasian ancestry). The ancient and present-day Iranian populations from Central Asia form together a cline between Iranian Neolithic farmers and Central Steppe Bronze Age, with a clear shift in ancestry toward Steppe between Bronze Age and Iron Age, and a smaller shift toward eastern Asian ancestry between Iron Age and present-day. This shift is more pronounced for Tajiks than Yaghnobis, with additional South Asian related ancestry among the former.

The Yaghnobi may be used as proxy for historical Central Asian Steppe ancestry associated with the initial spread of Iranian languages.
