= Mazori Hatti Mullo =

- Location in Tajikistan
- Coordinates: 39°9′47.54″N 69°8′1.99″E
- Country: Tajikistan
- Province: Sughd

Mazori Hatti Mullo (Yaghnobi Мазори Ҳатти Мулло) is a mazar in the Yaghnob Valley in Tajikistan. It is located near to the village Sokan.
