= Petif =

- Location in Tajikistan
- Coordinates: 39°11′33″N 69°7′32″E
- Country: Tajikistan
- Region: Sughd Region
- District: Ayni District

Population (2007)
  - Total: 0
- Official languages: Russian (Interethnic); Tajik (State) (Note: Constitution of Tajikistan)

Petif (Russian: Петиф, Yaghnobi: Питип Pitip) is a village in Sughd Region, northwestern Tajikistan. It is part of the jamoat Anzob in the Ayni District. Its population was 0 in 2007.
