= Padipast =

- Location in Tajikistan
- Coordinates: 39°10′26″N 69°10′34″E
- Country: Tajikistan
- Region: Sughd Region
- District: Ayni District
- Elevation: 2,543 m (8,343 ft)

Population (2008)
  - Total: 21
- Official languages: Russian (Interethnic); Tajik (State) (Note: Constitution of Tajikistan)

Padipast (Yaghnobi Падипаст) is a village in Sughd Region, western Tajikistan. It is part of the jamoat Anzob in the Ayni District.
