= Pulraut =

- Location in Tajikistan
- Coordinates: 39°12′14″N 69°6′29″E
- Country: Tajikistan
- Region: Sughd Region
- District: Ayni District
- Elevation: 2,720 m (8,920 ft)

Population (2007)
  - Total: 11
- Official languages: Russian (Interethnic); Tajik (State) (Note: Constitution of Tajikistan)

Pulraut (Russian: Пульраут, Yaghnobi: Пулла Роԝут Pulla Rowut or Пулла Роԝт) is a village in Sughd Region, northwestern Tajikistan. It is part of the jamoat Anzob in the Ayni District. Its population was 11 in 2007.
