= Veshab =

- Location in Tajikistan
- Coordinates: 39°25′1″N 68°56′22″E
- Country: Tajikistan
- Region: Sughd Region
- District: Ayni District
- Official languages: Russian (Interethnic); Tajik (State)

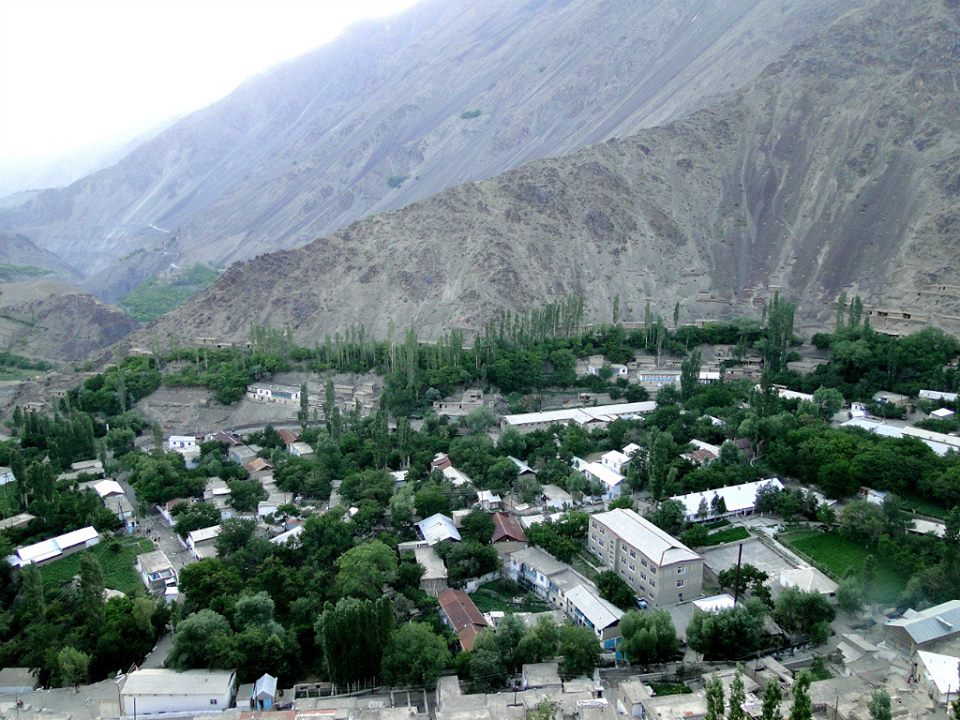
Veshab village

Veshab (Russian and Tajik: Вешаб) is a village in Sughd Region, northern Tajikistan. It is part of the jamoat Shamtuch in the Ayni District.
