= Showeta =

Showeta Yaghnobi: Шоԝета/Шоԝԝета Шовета
- Location in Tajikistan
- Coordinates: 39°11′33″N 69°04′06″E
- Country: Tajikistan
- Region: Sughd Region
- District: Ayni District
- Elevation: 2,520 m (8,270 ft)

Population (2007)
  - Total: 8
- Official languages: Russian (Interethnic); Tajik (State)

Showeta (Russian and Tajik: Шовета (transliteration Shoveta), Yaghnobi Шоԝета or Шоԝԝета) is a village in Sughd Region, northwestern Tajikistan. It is part of the jamoat Anzob in the Ayni District. Its population was 8 in 2007.
