= Dehbaland =

- Location in Tajikistan
- Coordinates: 39°10′14″N 69°10′42″E
- Country: Tajikistan
- Region: Sughd Region
- District: Ayni District
- Elevation: 2,600 m (8,500 ft)

Population (2017)
  - Total: 19

Dehbaland (Tajik: Деҳбаланд or Деҳи Баланд, Russian: Дебалян Debalyan, Yaghnobi Дебаланд or Деҳбаланд) is a village in Sughd Region, northwestern Tajikistan. It is located the Yaghnob Valley. It is part of the jamoat Anzob in the Ayni District. Its population was 19 in 2017.
