= Shakhsara =

Shakhsara Шахсара
- Location in Tajikistan
- Coordinates: 39°12′N 69°06′E
- Country: Tajikistan
- Region: Sughd Region
- District: Ayni District

Population (2007)
  - Total: 0
- Official languages: Russian (Interethnic); Tajik (State)

Shakhsara (Yaghnobi Шахсара, Russian: Шахсара) is a village in Sughd Region, western Tajikistan. It is part of the jamoat Anzob in the Ayni District. Its population was 0 in 2007.
