= Gharmayn =

- Location in Tajikistan
- Coordinates: 39°10′14″N 69°8′28″E
- Country: Tajikistan
- Region: Sughd Region
- District: Ayni District
- Elevation: 2,700 m (8,900 ft)

Population (2007)
  - Total: 49

Gharmayn (Tajik: Ғармайн, Russian: Гармен Garmen, Yaghnobi: Ғармен Gharmen) is a village in Sughd Region, northwestern Tajikistan. It is part of the jamoat Anzob in the Ayni District. Its population was 47 in 2017, down slightly from 49 in 2007. It is sometimes divided into a lower part (Domani Gharmen) and an upper part (Sari Gharmen).

The village consisted of several dwellings, that typically of Yaghnobi villages are constructed of dry stone walls and flat roofs. The village is connected by a road and possesses a water mill. The main crops are potatoes which are grown on the steep slope that the village sits on. There is no terracing.

== Toponymy ==
The village's name is Yaghnobi for "mountain village". The first part of its name "ғар", the Yaghnobi word for mountain, derives from the Sogdian "ꙋr", also meaning mountain.

== Geography ==
Gharmayn is situated at an altitude of approximately 2,700 metres (8,900 ft) above sea level. The village is located 98 kilometres (61 mi) from the center of the jamoat Anzob, and 133 kilometres (83 mi) from the center of the Ayni District.

== Demographics ==
Historical population
| Year | Pop. | ±% p.a. |
|---|---|---|
| 1870 | 0 | — |
| 1887 | 0 | 0.00% |
| 1904 | 0 | 0.00% |
| 1927 | 15 | — |
| 1941 | 22 | +2.77% |
| 1969 | 48 | +2.83% |
| 1995 | 6 | −7.69% |
| 2007 | 49 | +19.13% |
| 2017 | 47 | −0.42% |

Its population was 47 people as of 2017, slightly down from 49 in 2007.
