= Alowmayn =

- Location in Tajikistan
- Coordinates: 39°11′38″N 69°4′24″E
- Country: Tajikistan
- Region: Sughd Region
- District: Ayni District
- Elevation: 2,605 m (8,547 ft)

Population (2008)
  - Total: 0

Alowmayn or Olowmayn (Yaghnobi Алоԝмайн or Олоԝмайн) is a village in Sughd Region, western Tajikistan. It is part of the jamoat Anzob in the Ayni District.
