= Darg, Tajikistan =

Darg
- Location in Tajikistan
- Coordinates: 39°21′10″N 68°59′5″E
- Country: Tajikistan
- Region: Sughd Region
- District: Ayni District

Darg (Tajik: Дарғ Dargh) is a village in Sughd Region, northern Tajikistan. It is part of the jamoat Shamtuch in the Ayni District.
