= Varsaut =

- Location in Tajikistan
- Coordinates: 39°13′N 69°1′E
- Country: Tajikistan
- Region: Sughd Region
- District: Ayni District
- Elevation: 2,380 m (7,810 ft)

Population (2007)
  - Total: 0
- Official languages: Russian (Interethnic); Tajik (State)

Varsaut (Russian: Варсаут, Yaghnobi Ворсоут) is a village in Sughd Region, northwestern Tajikistan. It is part of the jamoat Anzob in the Ayni District. Its population was 0 in 2007.
