= Farkov =

- Location in Tajikistan
- Coordinates: 39°13′16″N 68°59′38″E
- Country: Tajikistan
- Region: Sughd Region
- District: Ayni District

Population (2007)
  - Total: 0

Farkov (Tajik: Фарков, Russian: Фаркау Farkau, Yaghnobi: Фаркоw) is a village in Sughd Region, northern Tajikistan. It is part of the jamoat Anzob in the Ayni District. Its population was 0 in 2007.
