= Mushtif =

Mushtif Мүштиф
- Location in Tajikistan
- Coordinates: 39°11′52″N 69°3′59″E
- Country: Tajikistan
- Region: Sughd Region
- District: Ayni District

Population (2007)
  - Total: 0

Mushtif (Yaghnobi: Мүштиф, Russian: Муштиф) is an abandoned village in Sughd Region, western Tajikistan. It is part of the jamoat Anzob in the Ayni District. Its population was 0 in 2007
