= Sokidara =

Sokidara Russian: Хисокидара Yaghnobi: Хисоки Дарв/Даԝр
- Location in Tajikistan
- Coordinates: 39°11′40″N 69°5′31″E
- Country: Tajikistan
- Region: Sughd Region
- District: Ayni District
- Elevation: 2,500 m (8,200 ft)

Population (2007)
  - Total: 0
- Official languages: Russian (Interethnic); Tajik (State)

Sokidara (Russian: Хисокидара; Tajik: Сокидара, Yaghnobi: Хисоки Дарв Khisoki Darv or Хисоки Даԝр Khisoki Dawr) is a village in Sughd Region, northwestern Tajikistan. It is part of the jamoat Anzob in the Ayni District. Its population was 0 in 2007.
