= Qul, Tajikistan =

Qul
- Location in Tajikistan
- Coordinates: 39°9′2″N 69°6′29″E
- Country: Tajikistan
- Region: Sughd Region
- District: Ayni District
- Elevation: 2,760 m (9,060 ft)

Population (2007)
  - Total: 60
- Official languages: Russian (Interethnic); Tajik (State) (Note: Constitution of Tajikistan)

Qul (Russian: Кул; Tajik: Қул, Yaghnobi: Қӯл), also known in Yaghnobi as S´imên (Yaghnobi: Шимен) is a village in Sughd Region, northwestern Tajikistan. The village is part of the jamoat Anzob in the Ayni District. Its population was 37 people as of 2017, down from 60 in 2007.

== Geography ==
Qul is situated at an altitude of 2,766 metres (9,075 ft) above sea level. The village is located 101 kilometres (63 mi) from the center of the jamoat Anzob, and 137 kilometres (85 mi) from the center of the Ayni District.

== Demographics ==
Historical population
Year	Pop.	±% p.a.
1887	22	—
1904	26	+0.99%
1927	25	−0.17%
1941	40	+3.41%
1995	9	−2.72%
2007	60	+17.13%
2017	37	−4.72%

Its population was 37 people as of 2017, down from 60 in 2007.
