= Dahana, Yaghnob =

Dahana
- Location in Tajikistan
- Coordinates: 39°9′1″N 69°7′6″E
- Country: Tajikistan
- Region: Sughd Region
- District: Ayni District
- Elevation: 2,620 m (8,600 ft)

Population (2007)
  - Total: 0

Dahana or Rupif (Russian: Дагана Dagana, Yaghnobi Даҳана, Рӯпиф, Қӯли Даҳана) is a village in Sughd Region, northwestern Tajikistan. It is part of the jamoat Anzob in the Ayni District. Its population was 0 in 2007.
