= Kansi, Yaghnob =

Kansi
- Location in Tajikistan
- Coordinates: 39°10′38″N 69°12′12″E
- Country: Tajikistan
- Region: Sughd Region
- District: Ayni District
- Elevation: 2,600 m (8,500 ft)

Population (2007)
  - Total: 0

Kansi (Yaghnobi Кансӣ) is a village in Sughd Region, northwestern Tajikistan. It is part of the jamoat Anzob in the Ayni District. Its population was 0 in 2007.
