= Chukkat, Yaghnob =

Chukkat
- Location in Tajikistan
- Coordinates: 39°11′35″N 69°6′35″E
- Country: Tajikistan
- Region: Sughd Region
- District: Ayni District
- Elevation: 2,520 m (8,270 ft)

Population (2007)
  - Total: 0

Chukkat (Yaghnobi: Чуккат or Чукат) is a village in Sughd Region, northwestern Tajikistan. It is part of the jamoat Anzob in the Ayni District. Its population was 0 in 2007.
