= Utogar =

Utogar Russian: Утогар Tajik: Утоғар
- Location in Tajikistan
- Coordinates: 39°24′N 68°55′E
- Country: Tajikistan
- Region: Sughd Region
- District: Ayni District
- Official languages: Russian (Interethnic); Tajik (State)

Utogar (Russian: Утогар; Tajik: Утоғар Utoghar) is a village in Sughd Region, northern Tajikistan. It is part of the jamoat Shamtuch in the Ayni District.
