= Shaydon =

Shaydon Шайдон (Russian and Tajik)
- Town and jamoat
- Location in Tajikistan
- Coordinates: 40°40′N 70°20′E
- Country: Tajikistan
- Region: Sughd Region
- District: Asht District

Population (2020)
  - Total: 18,200
- Time zone: UTC+5 (TJT)
- Official languages: Russian (Interethnic); Tajik (State)

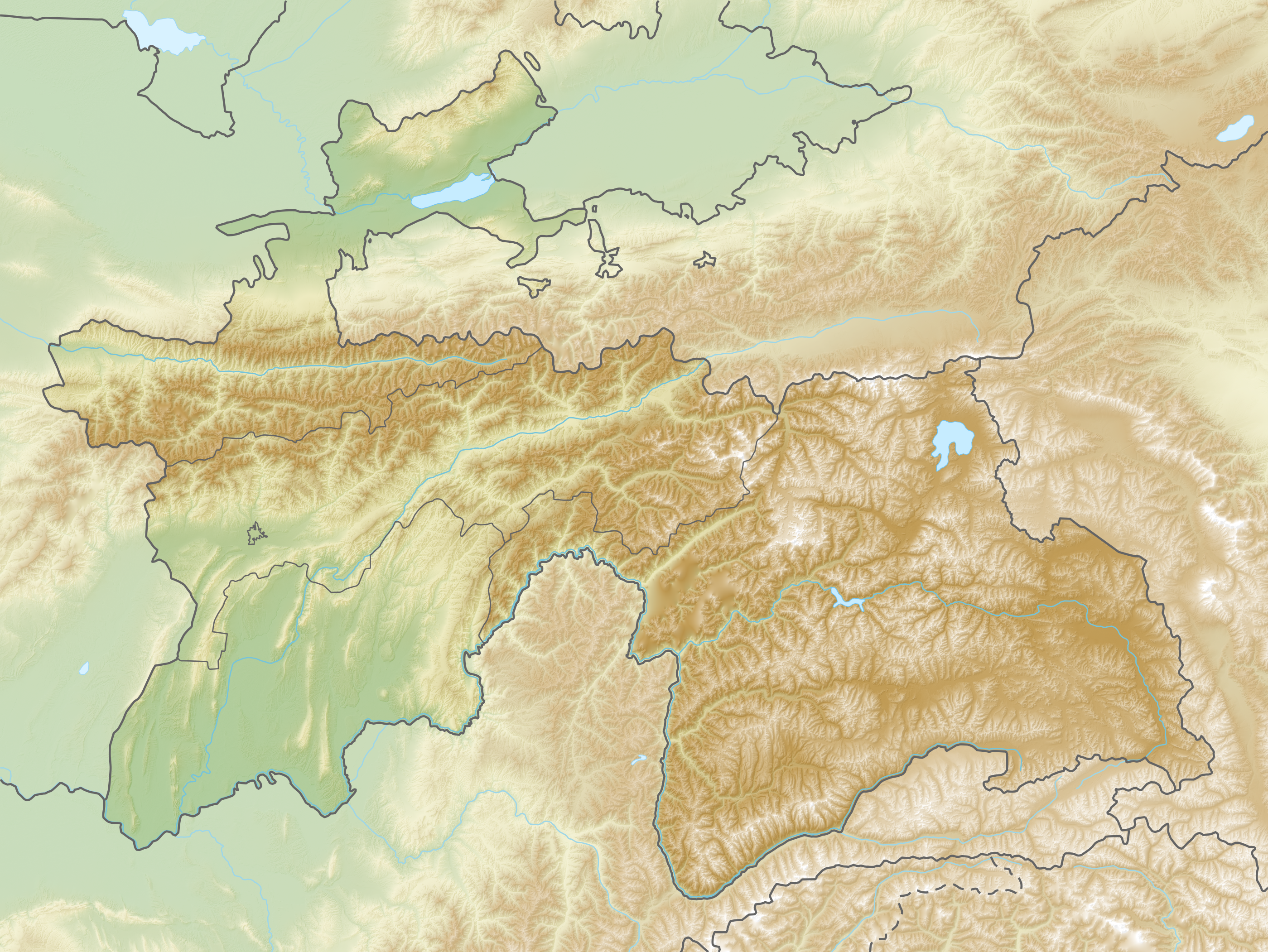

Shaydon (Russian and Tajik: Шайдон, formerly Asht (Russian and Tajik: Ашт)) is a town and a jamoat in north-west Tajikistan. It is the seat of Asht District in Sughd Region. The town proper has a population of 18,200 (2020). The jamoat consists of the town Shaydon and the villages Dahana, Kulikhoja and Mullomir.
