= Dehkalon =

- Location in Tajikistan
- Coordinates: 39°11′39″N 69°14′56″E
- Country: Tajikistan
- Region: Sughd Region
- District: Ayni District
- Elevation: 2,680 m (8,790 ft)

Population (2007)
  - Total: 0

Dehkalon (Tajik: Деҳи Калон Dehi Kalon, Russian: Дехикалон Dekhikalon, Yaghnobi Декалон or Деҳкалон) is a village in Sughd Region, northwestern Tajikistan. It is part of the jamoat Anzob in the Ayni District. Its population was 0 in 2007.
