= Witikhon =

- Location in Tajikistan
- Coordinates: 39°9′13.14″N 69°13′1.00″E
- Country: Tajikistan
- Region: Sughd Region
- District: Ayni District
- Elevation: 2,732 m (8,963 ft)

Population (2008)
  - Total: 0
- Official languages: Russian (Interethnic); Tajik (State)

Witikhon (Yaghnobi Ԝитихон) is a village in Sughd Region, western Tajikistan. It is part of the jamoat Anzob in the Ayni District.
