= Tagichinor =

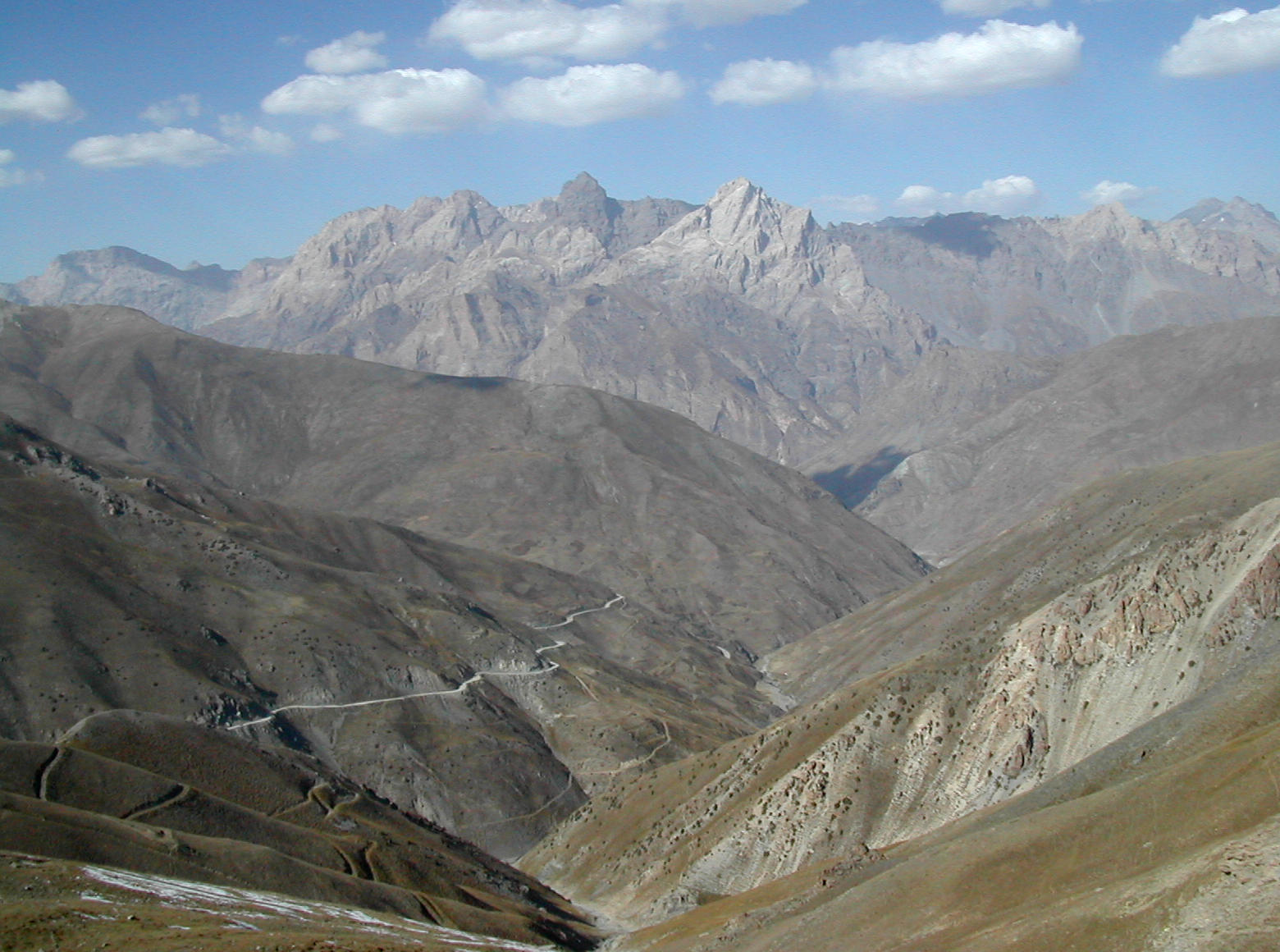
- Landscape near Tagichinor

- Location in Tajikistan
- Coordinates: 39°11′54″N 69°07′03″E
- Country: Tajikistan
- Region: Sughd Region
- District: Ayni District
- Elevation: 2,600 m (8,500 ft)

Population (2017)
  - Total: 32
- Official languages: Russian (Interethnic); Tajik (State)

Tagichinor (Russian: Раут or Russian: Тани Чанор; Tajik: Тагичинор, Yaghnobi Роԝут Rowut, Роԝт or Таги Чанор, Таги Чинор) is a village in Sughd Region, northwestern Tajikistan. It is part of the jamoat Anzob in the Ayni District. Its population was 32 people as of 2017, up from 18 in 2007.

The name means "under the sycamore tree".

== Geography ==
Tagichinor sits at an altitude of approximately 2,600 metres (8,500 ft) above sea level. It is situated above the right, northern bank of the River Yaghnob. Tagichinor is located 85 kilometres (53 mi) from the center of the jamoat Anzob, and 123 kilometres (76 mi) from the center of the Ayni District.

== Demographics ==
Historical population
Year	Pop.	±% p.a.
1870	27	—
1887	12	−4.66%
1904	13	+0.47%
1927	13	+0.00%
1941	17	+1.93%
1969	14	−0.69%
1995	6	−3.21%
2007	18	+9.59%
2017	32	+5.92%

Its population was 32 people as of 2017, up from 18 in 2007.
