= Tagob =

Tagob Russian: Тагаб Yaghnobi: Тагоб
- Location in Tajikistan
- Coordinates: 39°8′48″N 69°13′22″E
- Country: Tajikistan
- Region: Sughd Region
- District: Ayni District
- Elevation: 2,640 m (8,660 ft)

Population (2007)
  - Total: 0
- Official languages: Russian (Interethnic); Tajik (State)

Tagob (Russian: Тагаб; Yaghnobi: Тагоб) is a village in Sughd Region, northwestern Tajikistan. It is part of the jamoat Anzob in the Ayni District. Its population was 0 in 2007.
