= Sokan, Yaghnob =

Sokan
- Location in Tajikistan
- Coordinates: 39°9′55″N 69°8′10″E
- Country: Tajikistan
- Region: Sughd Region
- District: Ayni District
- Elevation: 2,700 m (8,900 ft)

Population (2007)
  - Total: 11
- Official languages: Russian (Interethnic); Tajik (State)

Sokan (Russian and Yaghnobi: Сокан) is a village in Sughd Region, northwestern Tajikistan. It is part of the jamoat Anzob in the Ayni District. Its population was 11 in 2007. The mazar of Mazori Hatti Mullo is located near the village.
