= Vakhsh =

Vakhsh may refer to the following, all in southern Tajikistan :

places and jurisdictions

- Vakhsh, Tajikistan city
- Vakhsh District, surrounding it
- Vakhsh, Jayhun District, a village in Jayhun District
- Vakhsh Range
- Vakhsh (river)

other

- Vakhsh Qurghonteppa, football club from Qurghonteppa
