= Moghiyon =

- Village and Jamoat
- Location in Tajikistan
- Coordinates: 39°15′N 67°39′E
- Country: Tajikistan
- Region: Sughd Region
- City: Panjakent

Population (2015)
  - Total: 19,553
- Time zone: UTC+5 (TJT)

Moghiyon (Tajik: Моғиён) is a village and jamoat in western Tajikistan. It is part of the city of Panjakent in Sughd Region. The jamoat has a total population of 19,553 (2015). It consists of 12 villages, including Puli Girdob (the seat), Ghezani Bolo and Ghezani-Poyon.
