= Zindakon =

- Location in Tajikistan
- Coordinates: 39°26′N 68°35′E
- Country: Tajikistan
- Region: Sughd Region
- District: Ayni District
- Official languages: Russian (Interethnic); Tajik (State)

Zindakon (Russian and Tajik: Зиндакон) is a village in Sughd Region, northern Tajikistan. It is part of the jamoat Ayni in the Ayni District.
