= Kanchoch =

Village in Sughd Region, Tajikistan

- Location in Tajikistan
- Coordinates: 39°2′50″N 68°20′38″E
- Country: Tajikistan
- Region: Sughd Region
- District: Ayni District

Kanchoch is a village in Sughd Region, north-western Tajikistan. It is located in Ayni District.
