= Nomitkon =

- Location in Tajikistan
- Coordinates: 39°11′43″N 69°6′11″E
- Country: Tajikistan
- Region: Sughd Region
- District: Ayni District
- Elevation: 2,500 m (8,200 ft)

Population (2007)
  - Total: 21

Nomitkon (Tajik: Нометкон Nometkon, Russian: Науметкан Naumetkan, Yaghnobi Номиткон or Нӯмиткӯн) is a village in Sughd Region, northwestern Tajikistan. It is part of the jamoat Anzob in the Ayni District. Its population was 21 in 2007.
