= Kiryonti =

- Location in Tajikistan
- Coordinates: 39°11′3″N 69°13′43″E
- Country: Tajikistan
- Region: Sughd Region
- District: Ayni District
- Elevation: 2,620 m (8,600 ft)

Population (2007)
  - Total: 107

Kiryonti (Yaghnobi: Кирёнтӣ, Tajik: Кирёнте Kiryonte) is a village in Sughd Region, northwestern Tajikistan. It is part of the Jamoat Anzob in the Ayni District. Its population was 86 people as of 2017, down from 107 in 2007.

== Geography ==
Piskon is situated at an altitude of 2,620 metres (8,600 ft) above sea level. The village is located 110 kilometres (68 mi) from the center of the jamoat Anzob, and 145 kilometres (90 mi) from the center of the Ayni District.

== Demographics ==
Historical population
Year	Pop.	±% p.a.
1870	18	—
1887	37	+4.33%
1904	40	+0.46%
1927	40	+0.00%
1941	82	+5.26%
1969	90	+0.33%
1995	12	−7.46%
2007	107	+20.00%
2017	86	−2.16%

Its population was 86 people as of 2017, down from 107 in 2007.
