= Yaghnob (river) =

River in northwestern Tajikistan

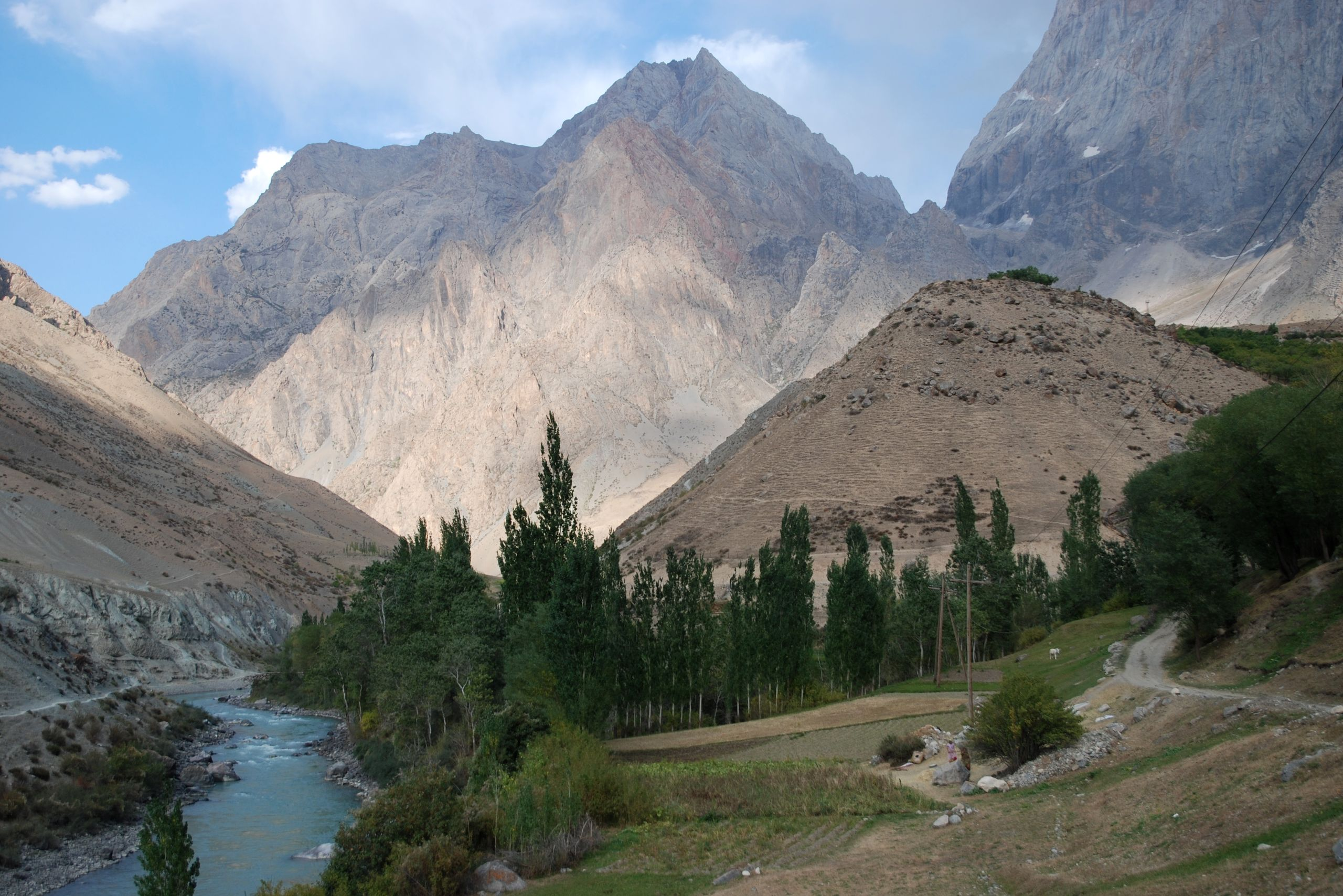

Location
- Country: Tajikistan

Physical characteristics
- Mouth: Fan Darya
  - coordinates: 39°11′19″N 68°32′18″E
- Length: 116 km (72 mi)
- Basin size: 1,660 km^{2} (640 mi^{2})
- Discharge
  - average: 32.2 m^{3}/s (1,140 cu ft/s)

Basin features
- Progression: Fan Darya→ Zeravshan→ Qorakoʻl oasis

The Yaghnob (Tajik: Яғноб) is a river in Ayni District of Sughd Region, Tajikistan. Together with the Iskander Darya, it forms the Fan Darya, a major left tributary of the Zeravshan.

The source of the Yaghnob is in the Matcha Mountains, where the Zarafshan and the Gissar Ranges merge. The Yaghnob is mainly fed by glaciers and snow fields. The river flows from the east to the west, south of and parallel to the upper Zeravshan River, through the Yaghnob Valley, a remote location populated by the Yaghnobi people speaking the eponymous Yaghnobi language. The main village in the valley is Anzob. It joins the east-flowing Iskander Darya to form the Fan Darya which flows north to join the Zeravshan at Ayni. The main road north from Dushanbe follows the lower Yaghnob and the Fan Darya. Before the Soviets blasted a road through, the upper valley was geographically isolated due to the presence of a deep gorge, contributing to the limited interaction with outside populations.
