= Piskon =

- Location in Tajikistan
- Coordinates: 39°10′37″N 69°9′46″E
- Country: Tajikistan
- Region: Sughd Region
- District: Ayni District
- Elevation: 2,609 m (8,560 ft)

Population (2007)
  - Total: 68
- Official languages: Russian (Interethnic); Tajik (State) (Note: Constitution of Tajikistan)

Piskon (Tajik: Пискон, Russian: Паскан Paskan, Yaghnobi: Пискон, پسکان) is a village in Sughd Region, northwestern Tajikistan. It is part of the jamoat Anzob in the Ayni District. Its population was 79 people as of 2017, up from 68 in 2007.

The village is connected by a gravel road and like most Yaghnobi villages consists of a cluster of dwelling constructed with dry stone walls and flat roofs. There is some terracing in the village itself and the topography is very steep.

== History ==
There are neolithic petroglyphs near the village. In the period following the Islamic conquest of their Sogdian ancestors, Piskon was a major center for Yaghnobi refugees.

== Geography ==
Piskon is situated at an altitude of 2,820 metres (9,250 ft) above sea level. The village is located 97 kilometres (60 mi) from the center of the jamoat Anzob, and 132 kilometres (82 mi) from the center of the Ayni District.

== Demographics ==
Historical population
Year	Pop.	±% p.a.
1870	35	—
1887	36	+0.17%
1904	38	+0.32%
1927	30	−1.02%
1941	29	−0.24%
1969	40	+1.16%
1995	7	−6.48%
2007	68	+20.86%
2017	79	+1.51%

Its population was 79 people as of 2017, up from 68 in 2007.
