= Zimare =

Zimare Зимаре
- Location in Tajikistan
- Coordinates: 39°7′49″N 68°41′27″E
- Country: Tajikistan
- Region: Sughd Region
- District: Ayni District
- Official languages: Russian (Interethnic); Tajik (State)

Zimare is a village in Sughd Region, north-western Tajikistan. It is located in Ayni District.
