= Dumzoy =

- Location in Tajikistan
- Coordinates: 39°11′46″N 69°4′41″E
- Country: Tajikistan
- Region: Sughd Region
- District: Ayni District
- Elevation: 2,480 m (8,140 ft)

Population (2017)
  - Total: 5

Dumzoy (Tajik: Думзой, Yaghnobi: Дүмзой) is a village in Sughd Region, northwestern Tajikistan. It is part of the jamoat Anzob in the Ayni District. Its population was 5 in 2017.
