= Marghtumayn =

Marghtumayn Марғтумайн
- Location in Tajikistan
- Coordinates: 39°12′N 69°04′E
- Country: Tajikistan
- Region: Sughd Region
- District: Ayni District
- Elevation: 2,480 m (8,140 ft)

Population (2007)
  - Total: 12

Marghtumayn (Tajik: Марғтумайн or Махтамайн Makhtamayn, Yaghnobi Марғтумайн) is a village in Sughd Region, northwestern Tajikistan. It is part of the jamoat Anzob in the Ayni District, and located east of the village Anzob. Its population was 12 in 2007.
