= Bidev =

Bidev Бидев or Бидеԝ
- Location in Tajikistan
- Coordinates: 39°12′18″N 69°3′58″E
- Country: Tajikistan
- Region: Sughd Region
- District: Ayni District
- Elevation: 2,580 m (8,460 ft)

Population (2007)
  - Total: 20
- Official languages: Russian (Interethnic); Tajik (State)

Bidev (Tajik: Бидев, Yaghnobi Бидев, also: Бедеф Bedef) is a village in Sughd Region, northwestern Tajikistan. It is part of the jamoat Anzob in the Ayni District. Its population was 20 in 2007.

The village consists of a dozen or so flat roofed residences built on the slope hill side of the valley set amount poplar trees. Below the village the river is flanked by a steep cliff.
