= Khishortob =

- Location in Tajikistan
- Coordinates: 39°13′26″N 68°54′3″E
- Country: Tajikistan
- Region: Sughd Region
- District: Ayni District
- Elevation: 2,296 m (7,533 ft)

Population (2007)
  - Total: 48

Khishortob (Tajik: Хишортоб or Хширтоб Khshirtob, Yaghnobi Хишортоw) is a village in Sughd Region, northwestern Tajikistan. It is part of the jamoat Anzob in the Ayni District, and located northeast of the village Anzob. The population of the village was 48 in 2007.
