= Chore, Tajikistan =

Chore چورى
- Location in Tajikistan
- Coordinates: 39°18′25″N 68°30′34″E
- Country: Tajikistan
- Region: Sughd Region
- District: Ayni District

Chore (Tajik: Чоре) is a village in Sughd Region, northern Tajikistan. It is part of the jamoat Ayni in the Ayni District. It is located near the M34 highway.
