= Ustanak =

- Location in Tajikistan
- Coordinates: 39°24′N 68°59′E
- Country: Tajikistan
- Region: Sughd Region
- District: Ayni District
- Official languages: Russian (Interethnic); Tajik (State)

Ustanak is a village in Sughd Region, north-western Tajikistan. It is located in Ayni District.
