= Kashi, Yaghnob =

Kashi
- Location in Tajikistan
- Coordinates: 39°12′0″N 69°6′30″E
- Country: Tajikistan
- Region: Sughd Region
- District: Ayni District
- Elevation: 2,600 m (8,500 ft)

Population (2007)
  - Total: 20

Kashi (Tajik: Каше Kashe, Yaghnobi: Кашӣ) is a village in Sughd Region, northwestern Tajikistan. It is part of the jamoat Anzob in the Ayni District. Its population was 20 in 2007.
