= Waghinzoy =

Waghinzoy Ԝағинзой
- Location in Tajikistan
- Coordinates: 39°11′54″N 69°3′49″E
- Country: Tajikistan
- Region: Sughd Region
- District: Ayni District
- Elevation: 2,580 m (8,460 ft)

Population (2007)
  - Total: 15
- Official languages: Russian (Interethnic); Tajik (State)

Waghinzoy (Yaghnobi Ԝағинзой, Tajik: Вағанзой Vaghanzoy, Russian: Вагинзой Vaginzoy) is a village in Sughd Region, northwestern Tajikistan. It is part of the jamoat Anzob in the Ayni District. Its population was 15 in 2007.

Like most villages in the Yaghnobi Valley the hamlet consists of a cluster of flat roofed dwellings built of drystone walls. The village is situated so the village has panoramic views up the valley.
