= Kumarg =

- Location in Tajikistan
- Coordinates: 39°22′N 68°35′E
- Country: Tajikistan
- Region: Sughd Region
- District: Ayni District

Kumarg (Tajik: Кумарғ Kumargh) is a village in Sughd Region, northern Tajikistan. It is part of the jamoat Ayni in the Ayni District.
