= Zasun =

- Location in Tajikistan
- Coordinates: 39°23′41″N 68°37′35″E
- Country: Tajikistan
- Region: Sughd Region
- District: Ayni District
- Official languages: Russian (Interethnic); Tajik (State)

Zasun (Russian and Tajik: Зосун Zosun) is a village in Sughd Region, northern Tajikistan. It is part of the jamoat Ayni in the Ayni District, and located east of the village Ayni.
