= Khushikat =

- Location in Tajikistan
- Coordinates: 39°26′N 68°30′E
- Country: Tajikistan
- Region: Sughd Region
- District: Ayni District

Khushikat (Tajik: Хушекат Khushekat) is a village in Sughd Region, northern Tajikistan. It is part of the jamoat Ayni in the Ayni District. It is located near an important interchange between the north–south M34 highway and the east–west RB12 highway.
