= Vadif =

Vodif
- Location in Tajikistan
- Coordinates: 39°27′45″N 70°09′20″E
- Country: Tajikistan
- Region: Sughd Region
- District: Kuhistoni Mastchoh District
- Official languages: Russian (Interethnic); Tajik (State)

Vodif (Russian: Водиф; Tajik: Водиф) is a village in Sughd Region, northwestern Tajikistan. It is part of the jamoat Langar in the Kuhistoni Mastchoh District.
