= Yertula =

- Location in Tajikistan
- Coordinates: 40°32′N 70°22′E
- Country: Tajikistan
- Region: Sughd Region
- District: Asht District
- Official languages: Russian (Interethnic); Tajik (State)

Yertula (Russian: Ертула; Tajik: Ертӯла) is a village in Sughd Region, northern Tajikistan. It is part of Asht District.
