= Utkansu =

- Location in Tajikistan
- Coordinates: 40°33′36″N 69°41′39″E
- Country: Tajikistan
- Region: Sughd Region
- Official languages: Russian (Interethnic); Tajik (State)

Utkansu is a village in Sughd Region, northern Tajikistan. It is located near the city Istiqlol.
