= Navobod, Panjakent =

Navobod
- Location in Tajikistan
- Coordinates: 39°26′56″N 67°55′15″E
- Country: Tajikistan
- Region: Sughd Region
- City: Panjakent
- Elevation: 1,147 m (3,763 ft)

Population (2008)
  - Total: 1,500
- Time zone: (UTC +06:00)

Navobod or Nawobod (Tajik: Навобод, Yaghnobi Наԝобод or Навобод) is a village in Sughd Region, northern Tajikistan. It is part of the jamoat Loiq Sherali in the city of Panjakent, east of the central city. The population is majority ethnic Tajik people, with some ethnic Uzbeks settlement.
