= Cholota =

- Location in Tajikistan
- Coordinates: 40°39′N 69°30′E
- Country: Tajikistan
- Region: Sughd Region
- District: Mastchoh District

Cholota (Tajik: Чолота) is a village in Sughd Region, northern Tajikistan. It is part of the Mastchoh District.
