= Roshorv =

Village on the Bartang River in Tajikistan

Roshorv Рошорв
- Location in Tajikistan
- Coordinates: 38°19′04″N 72°19′29″E
- Country: Tajikistan
- Region: Gorno-Badakhshan Autonomous Region
- District: Rushon District

Roshorv (Tajik: Рошорв) is a village in Gorno-Badakhshan Autonomous Region, southeastern Tajikistan. It is part of the jamoat Savnob in Rushon District. It lies on the upper reaches of the river Bartang.

Roshorv is situated on a plateau and is settled and has cultivated land. In his journey the Pamir Mountains in 1897-98, British agent Ralph Cobbold passed through Roshorv. In his memoirs Cobbold stated that the village had fifty houses.

The population of Roshorv is Tajik and speaks a district dialect of the Rushani language.
