= Ghezani-Poyon =

- Location in Tajikistan
- Coordinates: 39°17′N 67°43′E
- Country: Tajikistan
- Region: Sughd Region
- City: Panjakent

Ghezani-Poyon or Ghezan (Tajik: Ғезани-Поён) is a village in Sughd Region, northern Tajikistan. It is part of the jamoat Moghiyon in the city of Panjakent.
