= Natural economy =

Natural economy is a type of economy in which money is not used in the transfer of resources among people. It is a system of allocating resources through direct bartering, entitlement by law, or sharing out according to traditional custom. In the more complex forms of natural economy, some goods may act as a referent for fair bartering, but generally currency plays only a small role in allocating resources. As a corollary, the majority of goods produced in a system of natural economy are not produced for the purpose of exchanging them, but for direct consumption by the producers (subsistence). As such, natural economies tend to be self-contained, where all the goods consumed are produced domestically.

The term has often been used in opposition to other forms of economy, most notably capitalism. Rosa Luxemburg believed that the destruction of the natural economy was a necessary condition for the development of capitalism. Karl Marx described the Inca Empire as a "natural economy"; it existed as an isolated society which was based on subsistence and barter without profitmaking, with some products functioning as commodity money.

Other writers have used a more relative sense of natural economy. Belgian economic historian Henri Pirenne noted that medieval Europe has often been described as a natural economy despite the existence of money, since money played a much less significant role than in earlier or later periods.

== See also ==
- Calculation in kind
- Gift economy
- Resource based economy
- Subsistence economy
