= Ghezani Bolo =

- Location in Tajikistan
- Coordinates: 39°17′05″N 67°43′25″E
- Country: Tajikistan
- Region: Sughd Region
- City: Panjakent

Ghezani Bolo (Tajik: Ғезани Боло) is a village in Sughd Region, northern Tajikistan. It is part of the jamoat Moghiyon in the city of Panjakent.
