= Dahana, Asht District =

Village in Sughd Region, Tajikistan

Dahana
- Location in Tajikistan
- Coordinates: 40°39′N 70°17′E
- Country: Tajikistan
- Region: Sughd Region
- District: Asht District

Dahana is a village in northern Tajikistan. It is part of Asht District in Sughd Region.
