= Sogdian language =

Extinct Eastern Iranian language of Central Asia

Sogdian
- swγδyk
- Region: Central Asia, China
- Era: 1st millennium BCE – 1000 CE developed into modern Yaghnobi
- Language family: Indo-European: Indo-Iranian; Iranian; Northeastern; Sogdo-Bactrian; Sogdian
- Writing system: Sogdian alphabet; Syriac alphabet; Manichaean alphabet

Language codes
- ISO 639-2: sog
- ISO 639-3: sog
- Glottolog: sogd1245

The Sogdian language (Sogdian: swγδyk) was an Eastern Iranian language spoken mainly in the Central Asian region of Sogdia (capital: Samarkand; other chief cities: Panjakent, Fergana, Khujand, and Bukhara), located in modern-day Uzbekistan, Tajikistan, Kazakhstan and Kyrgyzstan; it was also spoken by some Sogdian immigrant communities in ancient China. Sogdian is one of the most important Middle Iranian languages, along with Bactrian, Khotanese Saka, Middle Persian, and Parthian. It possesses a large literary corpus. The Sogdian language was the most important lingua franca of Mongolia, China, and Inner Asia, and one of the official languages of the First Turkic Khanate and also a lingua franca in the Uyghur Khanate.

The Sogdian language is usually assigned to a Northeastern group of the Iranian languages. No direct evidence of an earlier version of the language ("Old Sogdian") has been found, although mention of the area in the Old Persian inscriptions means that a separate and recognisable Sogdia existed at least since the Achaemenid Empire (559–323 BCE).

Similar to Khotanese, Sogdian may have possessed a more conservative grammar and morphology than Middle Persian. The modern Eastern Iranian language Yaghnobi is the descendant of a dialect of Sogdian spoken around the 8th century in Osrushana, south of Sogdia.

== History ==
During the period of the Tang dynasty (ca. 7th century CE) of China, Sogdian was the lingua franca in Central Asia of the Silk Road, along which it amassed a rich vocabulary of loanwords such as tym 'hotel' from the Middle Chinese /tem/ (Chinese: 店).

The economic and political importance of Sogdian guaranteed its survival in the first few centuries after the Muslim conquest of Sogdia in the early eighth century. A dialect of Sogdian spoken around the 8th century in Osrushana (capital: Bunjikat, near present-day Istaravshan, Tajikistan), a region to the south of Sogdia, developed into the Yaghnobi language and has survived into the 21st century. It is spoken by the Yaghnobi people.

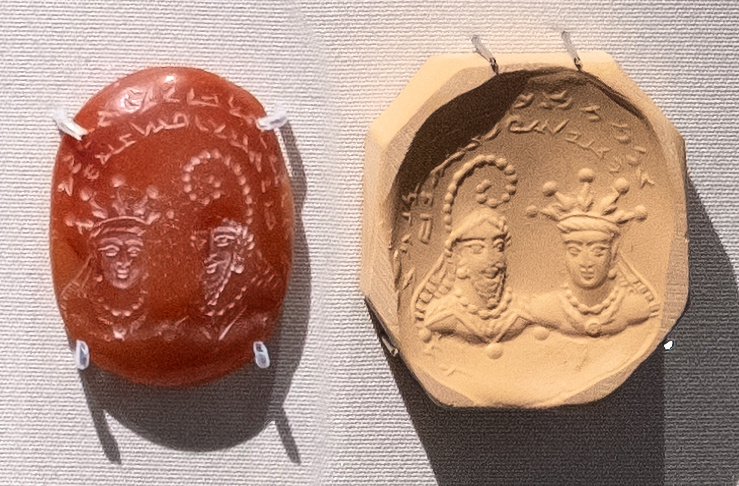
Seal with two facing busts and Sogdian inscription "Indamic, Queen of Zacanta", Kushano-Sasanian period, 300-350 CE. British Museum 119999.

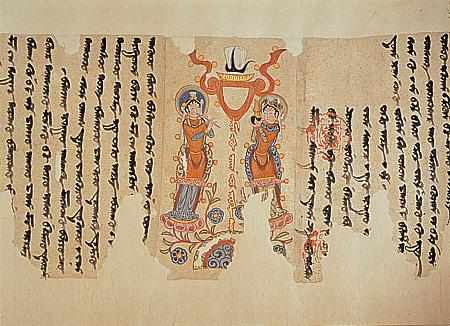
Sogdian text from a Manichaean creditor letter from around 9th to 13th century

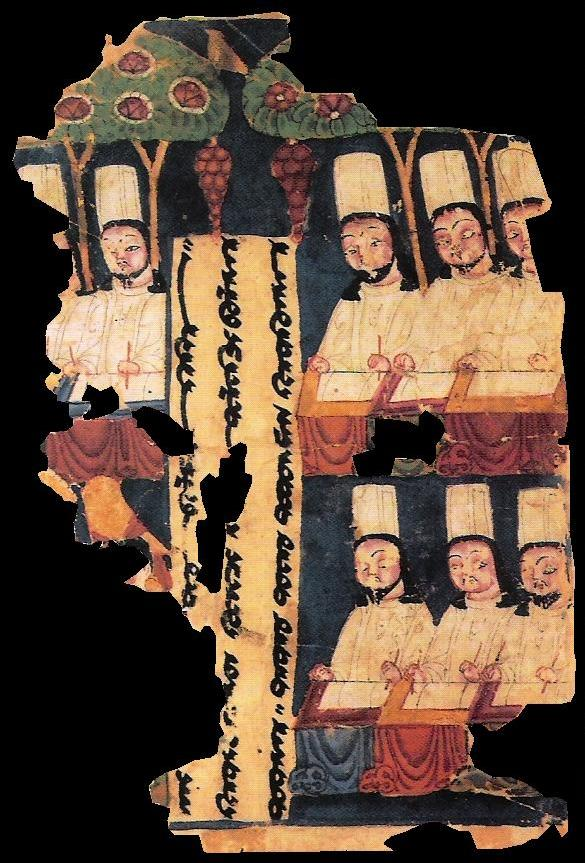
Manichaean priests (Uyghur Turks) writing Sogdian manuscripts, in Khocho, Tarim Basin, c. 8th/9th century AD

== Discovery of Sogdian texts ==
The first discovered Sogdian text was the Karabalgasun inscription, but it was not understood until 1909 that it contained text in Sogdian.

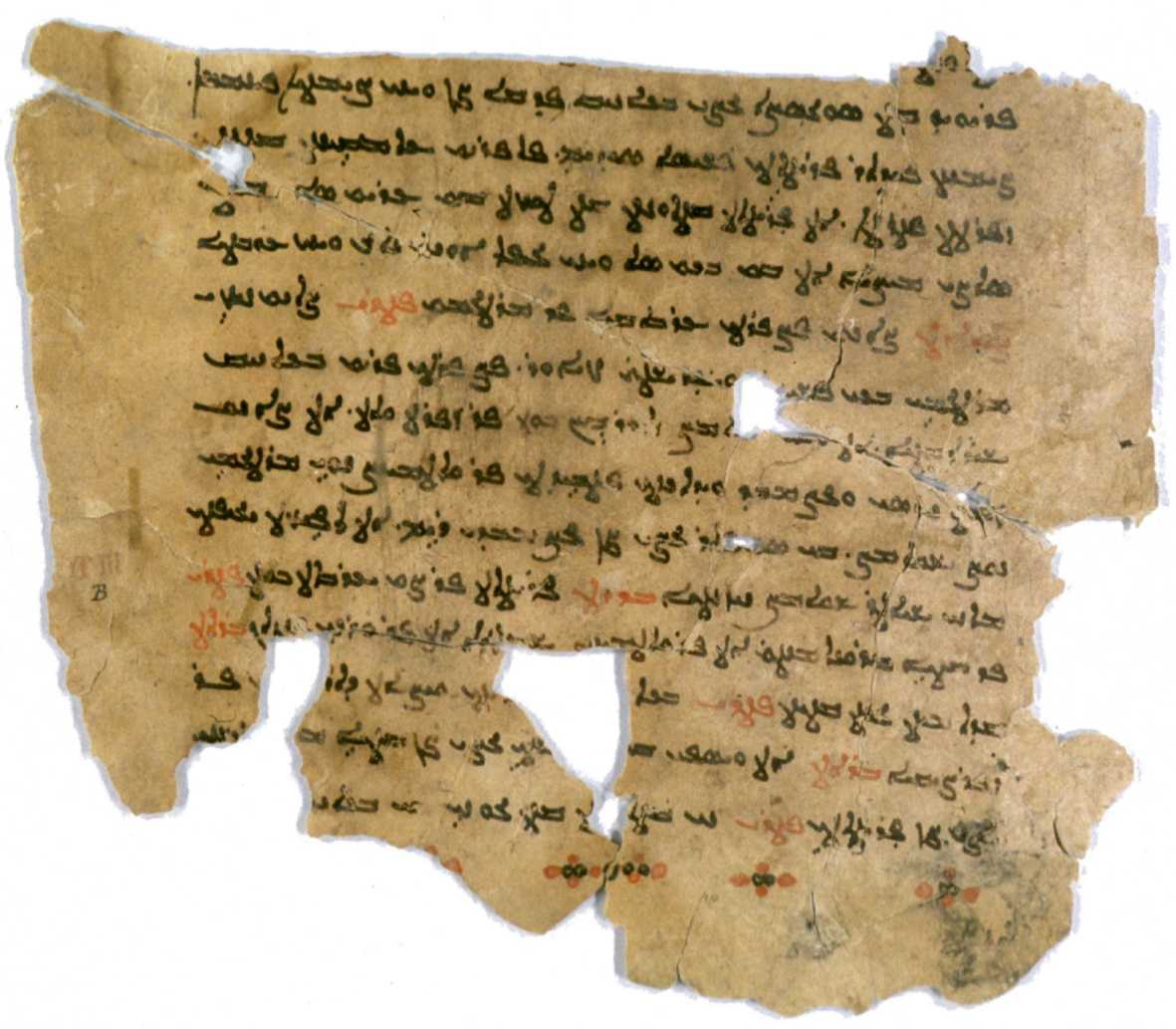
Sogdian Christian text written in Estrangelo, discovered at Turpan, 9th—11th century.

Aurel Stein discovered five letters written in Sogdian, known as the "Ancient Letters", in an abandoned watchtower near Dunhuang in 1907, dating to the end of the Western Jin dynasty. The finding of manuscript fragments of the Sogdian language in China's Xinjiang region sparked the study of the language. Robert Gauthiot (the first Buddhist Sogdian scholar) and Paul Pelliot (who explored in Dunhuang and retrieved Sogdian material there) began investigating the Sogdian material that Pelliot had discovered in 1908. Gauthiot published many articles based on his work with Pelliot's material but died during the First World War. One of Gauthiot's most impressive articles was a glossary to the Sogdian text, which he was in the process of completing when he died. This work was continued by Émile Benveniste after Gauthiot's death.

Various Sogdian pieces have been found in the Turfan text corpus by the German Turfan expeditions. These expeditions were controlled by the Ethnological Museum of Berlin. These pieces consist almost entirely of religious works by Manichaean and Christian writers, including translations of the Bible. Most of the Sogdian religious works are from the 9th and 10th centuries.

Dunhuang and Turfan were the two most plentiful sites of Manichean, Buddhist, and Christian Sogdian texts. Sogdiana itself actually contained a much smaller collection of texts, discovered in the early 1930s near Mount Mug in Tajikistan. The texts, related to business, belonged to a minor Sogdian king, Divashtich. They dated back to the time of the Muslim conquest, about 700.

Between 1996 and 2018, a number of inscribed fragments have been found at Kultobe in Kazakhstan. They date back to the Kangju culture, are significantly earlier than the 4th century AD and showcase an archaic state of Sogdian.

In the years between 2003 and 2020, three new bilingual Chinese-Sogdian epitaphs have been discovered and published.

== Writing system ==
Similar to all other writing systems employed for Middle Iranian languages, the Sogdian alphabet ultimately derives from the Aramaic alphabet. Similar to its close relatives, the Pahlavi scripts, written Sogdian contains many logograms or ideograms, which were Aramaic words that were written to represent native spoken ones. The Sogdian script is the direct ancestor of the Old Uyghur alphabet, which is itself the forerunner of the Traditional Mongolian alphabet.

As in other writing systems descended from the Proto-Sinaitic script, there are no special signs for vowels. As in the parent Aramaic system, the consonantal signs ’ y w can be used as matres lectionis for the long vowels [a: i: u:] respectively. However, unlike it, the consonant signs would also sometimes serve to express the short vowels, which could also sometimes be left unexpressed and always are in the parent systems. To distinguish long vowels from short ones, an additional aleph can be written before the sign that denotes the long vowel.

Sogdian also used the Manichaean alphabet, which consists of 29 letters.

In transcribing Sogdian script into Roman letters, Aramaic ideograms are often noted by means of capitals.

== Phonology ==
=== Consonants ===
The consonant inventory of Sogdian is as follows (parentheses mark allophones or marginal phonemes):

	Labial	Dental	Alveolar	Palatal / Postalveolar	Velar/Glottal
Plosive/Affricate	p (b)	t (d)	(ts)	t͡ʃ (d͡ʒ)	k (g)
Fricative	f β	θ ð	s z	ʃ ʒ	x ɣ
Nasal	m		n		(ŋ)
Liquid/Glide	w		r (l)	j	(h)

=== Vowels ===
Sogdian has the following simple vowels:

	Front	Central	Back
Close	iː i	(ɨ)	u uː
Mid	eː e	(ə)	o oː
Open	a	aː	

Sogdian also has three rhotacized vowels: ə^{r}, i^{r}, u^{r}.

The diphthongs in Sogdian are āi, āu and those whose second element is a rhotacized vowel or a nasal element ṃ.

== Morphology ==
Sogdian has two different sets of endings for so-called 'light' and 'heavy' stems. A stem is heavy if it contains at least one heavy syllable (containing a long vowel or diphthong); stems containing only light vowels are light. In heavy stems, stress falls on the stem, and in light stems, it falls on the suffix or ending.

=== Nouns ===
==== Light stems ====
Case	masc. a-stems	neut. a-stems	fem. ā-stems	masc. u-stems	fem. ū-stems	masc. ya-stems	fem. yā-stems	plural
nom.	-i	-u	-a, -e	-a	-a	-i	-yā	-ta, -īšt, -(y)a
voc.	-u	-u	-a	-i, -u	-ū	-iya	-yā	-te, -īšt(e), -(y)a
acc.	-u	-u	-u, -a	-u	-u	-(iy)ī	-yā(yī)	-tya, -īštī, -ān(u)
gen.-dat.	-ē	-yē	-ya	-(uy)ī	-uya	-(iy)ī	-yā(yī)	-tya, -īštī, -ān(u)
loc.	-ya	-ya	-ya	-(uy)ī	-uya	-(iy)ī	-yā(yī)	-tya, -īštī, -ān(u)
instr.-abl.	-a	-a	-ya	-(uy)ī	-uya	-(iy)ī	-yā(yī)	-tya, -īštī, -ān(u)

==== Heavy stems ====
Case	masc.	fem.	plural
nom.	-∅	-∅	-t
voc.	-∅, -a	-e	-te
acc.	-ī	-ī	-tī, -ān
gen.-dat.	-ī	-ī	-tī, -ān
loc.	-ī	-ī	-tī, -ān
instr.-abl.	-ī	-ī	-tī, -ān

==== Contracted stems ====
Case	masc. aka-stems	neut. aka-stems	fem. ākā-stems	pl. masc.	pl. fem.
nom.	-ē	(-ō), -ē	-ā	-ēt	-ēt, -āt
voc.	(-ā), -ē	(-ō), -ē	-ā	(-āte), -ēte	-ēte, -āte
acc.	(-ō), -ē	(-ō), -ē	-ē	-ētī, -ān	-ētī, -ātī
gen.-dat.	-ē	-ē	-ē	-ētī, -ān	-ētī, -ātī
loc.	-ē	-ē	-ē	-ētī, -ān	-ētī, -ātī
instr.-abl.	(-ā), -ē	(-ā), -ē	-ē	-ētī, -ān	-ētī, -ātī

=== Verbs ===
==== Present indicative ====
Person	Light stems	Heavy stems
1st. sg.	-ām	-am
2nd. sg.	-ē, (-∅)	-∅, -ē
3rd. sg.	-ti	-t
1st. pl.	-ēm(an)	-ēm(an)
2nd. pl.	-θa, -ta	-θ(a), -t(a)
3rd. pl.	-and	-and

==== Imperfect indicative ====
Person	Light stems	Heavy stems
1st. sg.	-u	-∅, -u
2nd. sg.	-i	-∅, -i
3rd. sg.	-a	-∅
1st. pl.	-ēm(u), -ēm(an)	-ēm(u), -ēm(an)
2nd. pl.	-θa, -ta	-θ(a), -t(a)
3rd. pl.	-and	-and

== Sources ==
- Sims-Williams, Nicholas (2022). "The Rediscovery of Sogdian". In Parry, Ken; Mikkelsen, Gunner (eds.). Byzantium to China: Religion, History and Culture on the Silk Roads. Leiden: Brill. pp. 483–497. ISBN 9789004517981.
- Yoshida, Yutaka (2010). "Sogdian". In Windfuhr, Gernot (ed.). The Iranian Languages. Taylor & Francis Group. pp. 279–335.
