= Vakhsh, Jayhun District =

Vakhsh Вахш
- Location in Tajikistan
- Coordinates: 37°23′07″N 68°36′32″E
- Country: Tajikistan
- Region: Khatlon Region
- District: Jayhun District
- Official languages: Russian (Interethnic); Tajik (State)

Vakhsh (Russian and Tajik: Вахш) is a village in Khatlon Region, Southwestern Tajikistan. It is part of the jamoat Istiqlol (formerly: Telman) in Jayhun District. It lies 7 km northwest of the district seat Dusti, and approximately 130 kilometers south of the capital, Dushanbe.
