= Mullomir =

Mullomir Мулломир
- Village
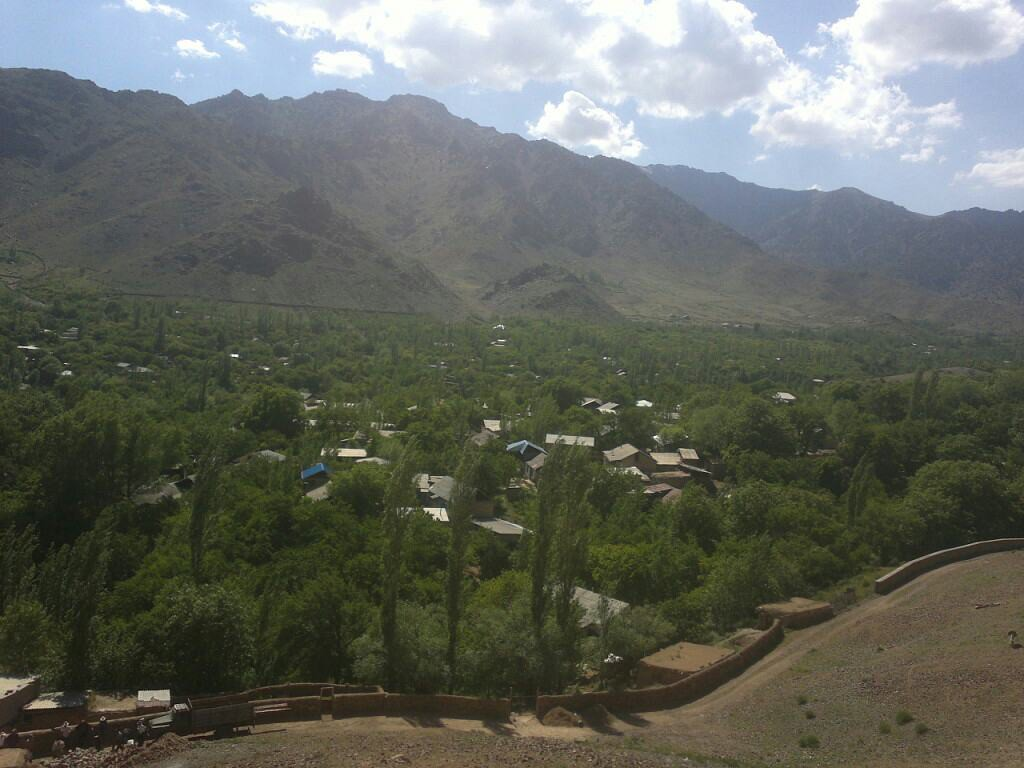

- Flag

- Location in Tajikistan
- Coordinates: 40°43′49″N 70°09′25″E
- Country: Tajikistan
- Region: Sughd Region
- District: Asht District
- Time zone: UTC+5 (TJT)
- Calling code: +992 92
- Website: http://www.mullomir.ru

Mullomir (Tajik: Мулломир) is a village in Sughd Region, Tajikistan. The name of the village consists of two parts. Mullo - the mullah, the priest, the competent person and world - the governor, the prince. Settles down at rise on Pass Kandir-davvan, at the main Kuraminsky ridge, in an upper course of Dakhanskoya. On foot from it in three hours in good weather it is possible to pass the pass and to go down on the western slope of the Kuraminsky ridge, to the settlement of Koshrabat.
