= Ayni, Ayni District =

Ayni Russian: Айни Tajik: Айнӣ
- Village and Jamoat
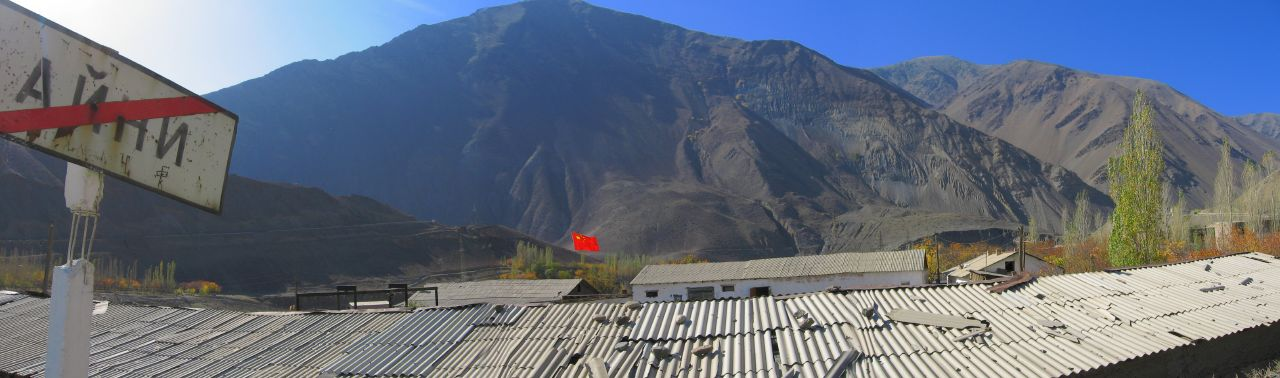

- Location in Tajikistan
- Coordinates: 39°23′51″N 68°32′26″E
- Country: Tajikistan
- Region: Sughd Region
- District: Ayni District

Population (2015)
  - Total: 14,862
- Time zone: UTC+5 (TJT)
- Official languages: Russian (Interethnic); Tajik (State)

Ayni (Russian: Айни; Tajik: Айнӣ) is a village and jamoat in north-west Tajikistan. It is the capital of Ayni District in Sughd Region, named after the Tajik national poet Sadriddin Ayni. It lies about 177 kilometres (110 mi) from Khujand and 165 kilometres (103 mi) from Dushanbe on the bank of the river Zeravshan. The jamoat has a total population of 14,862 (2015). It consists of 11 villages, including Ayni (the seat), Chore, Khushikat, Kumarg, Zasun and Zindakon.

== History ==
Ayni is an ancient town of the Sogdian civilization and later became an Islamic town; a minaret known as the Varz-i Manor (dated 9th-12th century) still stands. Between 1930 and 1955 it was known as Zahmatobod. It was a notable centre for Tajik nationalists.

== Economy ==
Agriculture, tobacco, grain and fruit production form the backbone of the local economy, and there is also a large coal mine Fa-Yagh-nob with a 1.8 billion ton capacity, and a plant located here.
