= Zarafshan, Tajikistan =

Zarafshan Russian: Зеравшан Tajik: Зарафшон
- Town and Jamoat
- Location in Tajikistan
- Coordinates: 39°10′14″N 68°37′33″E
- Country: Tajikistan
- Region: Sughd Region
- District: Ayni District

Population (2020)
  - Total: 2,400
- Time zone: UTC+5 (TJT)
- Official languages: Russian (Interethnic); Tajik (State)

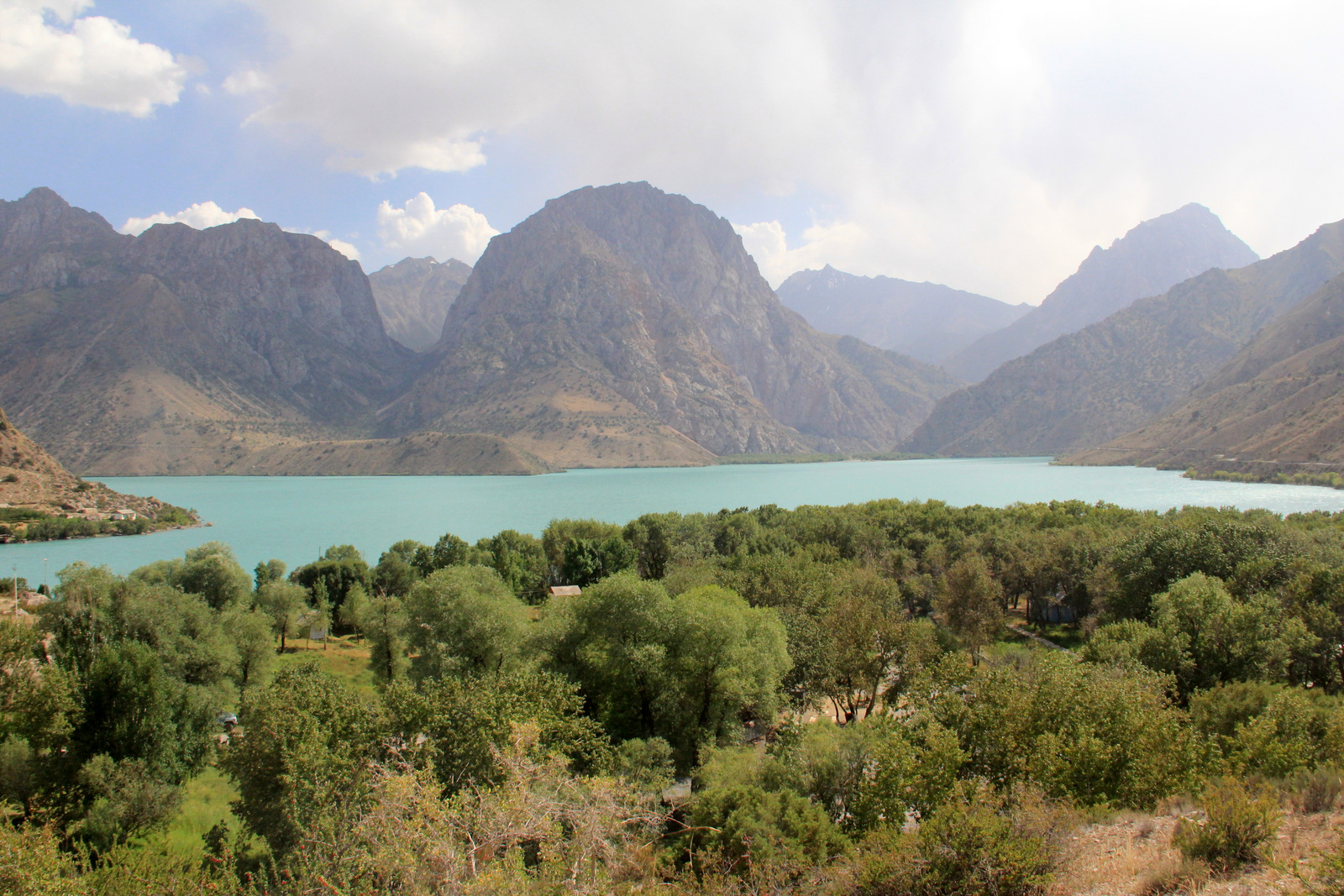

Zarafshan (Russian: Зеравшан; Tajik: Зарафшон) is a town in north-west Tajikistan. It is situated on the northern slope of the Gissar Range. It is located in Ayni District in Sughd Region. The town has a total population of 2,400 (Jan. 2020).

== See also ==
- Zeravshan (river)
- Zarafshan Mountains
