= Shamtuch =

Shamtuch Шамтуч (Russian and Tajik)
- Village and Jamoat
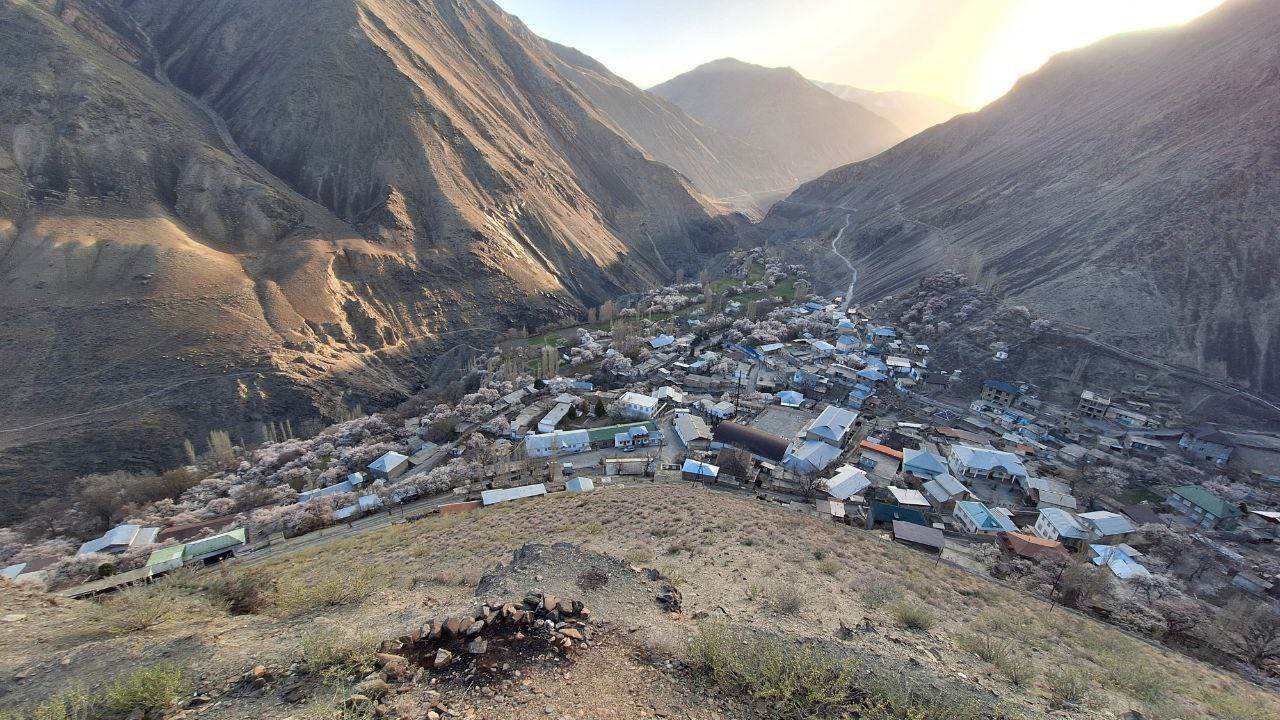

- Location in Tajikistan
- Coordinates: 39°24′N 69°02′E
- Country: Tajikistan
- Region: Sughd Region
- District: Ayni District

Population (2015)
  - Total: 6,557
- Time zone: UTC+5 (TJT)
- Official languages: Russian (Interethnic); Tajik (State)

Shamtuch is a village located in the Shamtuch Jamoat of Ayni District, Sughd Region, Republic of Tajikistan. It lies 54 km southeast of the district center, Ayni, and 8 km from the jamoat administrative center.

== Geography and nature ==
Shamtuch is situated in the lush foothills of the Zerafshan mountain range, characterized by a mountainous climate, fresh air, and pure natural springs. The surrounding landscape features many beloved places named by locals, including Kargtuda, Dashti Bolo, Ustonak, Vebkak, Duoba, Bedak, Dariosiyo, Chandakozot, Cheshil, and Saroy Havz.

== Economy and livelihood ==
The local population is primarily engaged in agriculture, animal husbandry, and fruit cultivation. The area is particularly famous for its flavorful apricots — especially the Kandak, Mayzak, and Mirsanchali varieties — which are sun-dried into a natural product called ashtak (a type of dried apricot). Other cultivated fruits include apples, quinces, pears, and peaches.

== History and culture ==
Shamtuch is one of the ancient villages of the Zerafshan Valley. Historic stone inscriptions and epitaphs in Tajik and Arabic have been discovered in the surrounding mountains, dating back to the 14th–18th centuries. Some are attributed to spiritual figures such as Mir Shaykhi Shamtuchi and Qosimi Shamtuchi.

== Sacred sites ==
Shamtuch is home to two well-known mausoleums, visited and respected by locals and travelers alike:

- Mausoleum of Khoja Shaykh Dehkon Shamtuchi – a revered spiritual leader associated with the Sufi tradition of the Zerafshan region.
- Mausoleum of Khoja Saifiddin – a local saint honored for his piety and spiritual insight.

== Notable people ==
Shamtuch has produced several notable figures, including:

- Muhyiddin Olimpur – a prominent Tajik journalist and photographer known for his fearless reporting.

== Traditions and celebrations ==
Traditional life remains strong in Shamtuch. Holidays such as Nowruz, Ramadan, and Eid al-Adha are celebrated with joy and reverence. The beginning of Nowruz is symbolically marked when the sun sets behind the Shahi Navruzgoh mountain — a natural sign of the new season.
