= Constitution of Tajikistan =

Emblem of Tajikistan

The Constitution of Tajikistan (Russian: Конституция Таджикистана; Tajik: Конститутсияи Ҷумҳурии Тоҷикистон) was adopted on 6 November 1994 and amended three times, on 26 September 1999, on 22 June 2003 and on 22 May 2016.

The Constitution has the highest legal power, direct application (Article 10) and supremacy on the whole territory of Tajikistan. The Constitution proclaims the establishment of a democratic, legal, secular and unitary State (Article 1), where the State power is based on the principle of separation of powers (Article 9). As the fundamental law of the State, the Constitution defines the structure of the government, basic rights, liberties and responsibilities of its citizens, as well as the powers of the legislative, executive and judicial branches. Article 2 of the Constitution defines Tajik and Russian as the official languages of Tajikistan; the former being the national (state) language and the second being the "language of interethnic communication".

The bicameral Supreme Assembly (the parliament) adopts constitutional laws (Article 61), laws (Article 60) and resolutions (Articles 56–57), while the President adopts decrees and orders (Article 70) and the Cabinet of Ministers (the highest body of the executive branch) adopts resolutions and orders (Article 74).

== Article 1 ==
The Republic of Tajikistan is a sovereign, democratic, constitutional, secular, and unitary state.

== Article 2 ==
The state (national) language of Tajikistan shall be Tajik. Russian shall be the language of international communication. All nationalities and peoples living on the territory of the republic shall have the right to use their mother tongue.

== Article 4 ==
The capital of Tajikistan is the city of Dushanbe.

== Article 5 ==
The life, the honor, the dignity, and other natural human rights are inviolable. Human rights and freedoms are recognized, observed, and protected by the state.

== Article 8 ==
Public life in Tajikistan develops on the basis of political and ideological pluralism. No single ideology, including a religious ideology, may be adopted as the ideology of the state.

== Article 9 ==
The state power is divided into legislative, executive, and judicial branches.

== Article 11 ==
Tajikistan implements a peace-loving policy, respects the sovereignty and independence of other states, determines its external policy on the basis of international norms. War propaganda is prohibited.

== Article 12 ==
The economy of Tajikistan is based on different forms of ownership. The state guarantees freedom of economic and entrepreneurial activity, equality of rights, and legal protection of all forms of ownership, including private property.

== Article 13 ==
The land, the mineral resources, the water, the air space, the animal and plant kingdom, and other natural resources are the exclusive property of the state, and the state guarantees their efficient use in the interest of the people.

== Other chapters ==
- Chapter 2 (Articles 14–47) deals with human rights, freedoms, and basic duties of citizens and residents
- Chapter 3 (Articles 48–63) is devoted to the legislative branch Majlisi Oli (Russian: Маджлиси Оли, romanized: Madzhlisi Oli; Tajik: Маҷлиси Олии). According to the 1999 Constitution, Majlisi Oli (Supreme Assembly) consists of two chambers: The National Assembly, the upper chamber (Russian: Маджлиси миллии; Tajik: Маҷлиси миллии) and the Assembly of Representatives, the lower chamber (Russian: Маджлиси намояндагон, romanized: Madzhlisi namoyandagon; Tajik: Маджлиси намояндагон, romanized: Majlisi namoyandagon).
- Chapter 4 (Articles 64–72) is devoted to the President. According to the 1999 Constitution, the President is elected for a term of 7 years in direct popular elections. A president may not serve more than two consecutive terms (Article 65 as amended in the June 2003 referendum).
- Chapter 5 (Articles 73–75) is devoted to the executive branch
- Chapter 6 (Articles 76–80) deals with local government
- Chapters 8 and 9 (Articles 84–97) deal with the judicial branch
