= Anzob =

Anzob Анзоб
- Village and Jamoat
- Location in Tajikistan
- Coordinates: 39°9′57″N 68°49′26″E
- Country: Tajikistan
- Region: Sughd Region
- District: Ayni District

Population (2015)
  - Total: 8,238
- Time zone: UTC+5 (TJT)
- Official languages: Russian (Interethnic); Tajik (State)

Anzob (Tajik: Анзоб) is a village and jamoat in north-west Tajikistan. It is located in Ayni District in Sughd Region, in the Zarafshan Range, about 110 kilometres (68 mi) north of Dushanbe. The jamoat has a total population of 8,238 (2015). It is located on the M34 highway and in the Yaghnob River valley. Anzob has a mining and beneficiation complex.

The Jamoat consists of 23 villages, including Takfon (the seat), Anzob, Bidev, Dehbaland, Dumzoy, Gharmayn, Kashi, Khishortob, Kiryonti, Marghtumayn, Nomitkon, Piskon, Qul, Tagichinor and Waghinzoy.

== Anzob Pass ==
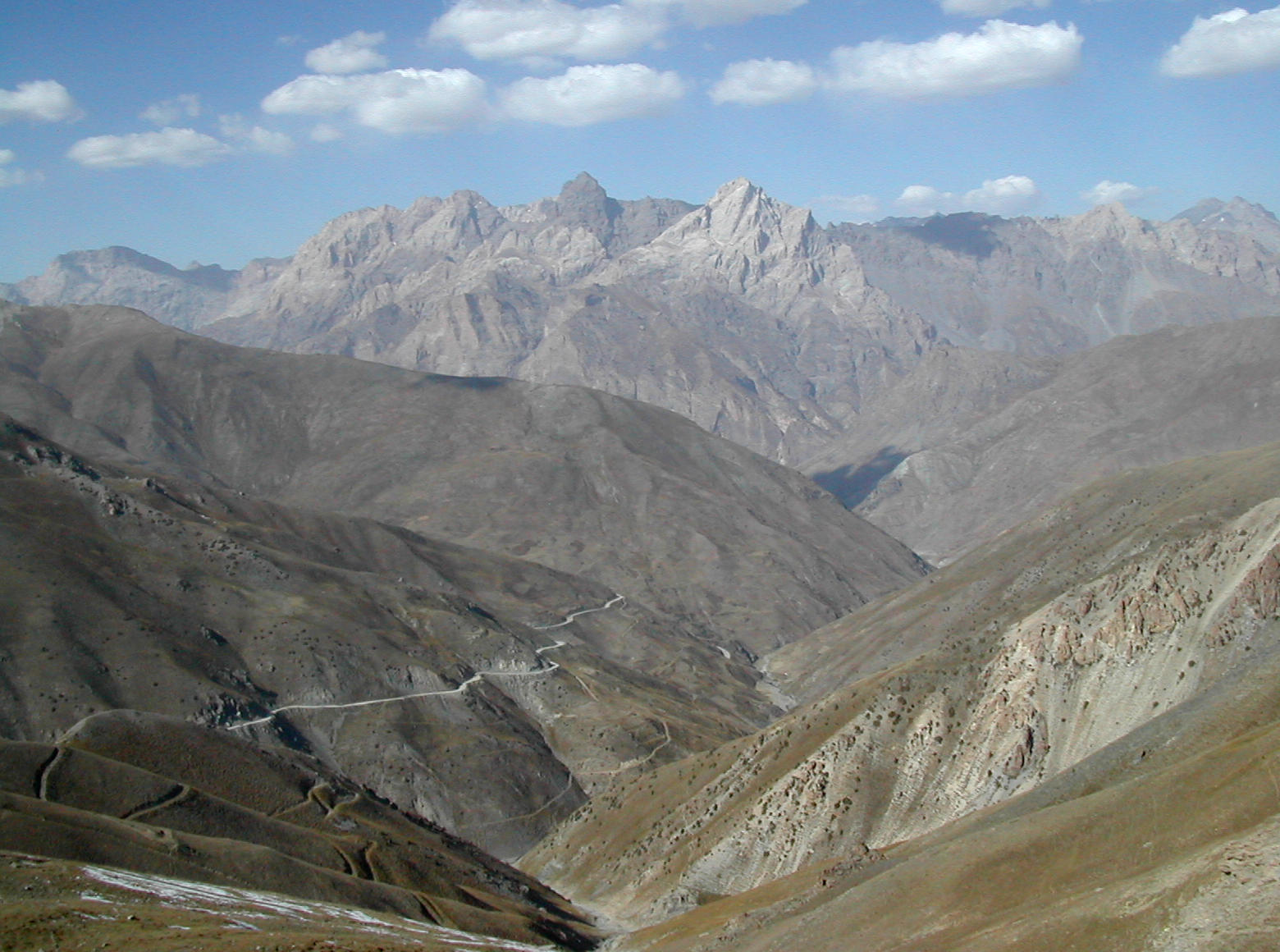
Near the Anzob Pass

The Anzob Pass to the south, about 90 kilometres (56 mi) north of Dushanbe at roughly 11,000 feet (3,400 m), is one of the most treacherous mountain passes of Central Asia. On October 23, 1997, an avalanche killed 46 people, burying 15 trucks and cars. The avalanche was so large that it took two weeks for the would-be rescuers to reach the victims. Due to the importance of the route connecting the north to south and its level of danger, the 5 kilometres (3.1 mi) Anzob Tunnel was built. Although construction was delayed due to electricity faults and other problems, the tunnel was completed in 2006.
