= Yaghnobi language =

East Iranian language spoken in Tajikistan

Yaghnobi
- Яғнобӣ зивок Yaghnobī zivok
- Native to: Tajikistan
- Region: originally from Yaghnob Valley, in 1970s relocated to Zafarobod, in 1990s some speakers returned to Yaghnob
- Ethnicity: Yaghnobi people
- Native speakers: 12,000 (2004)
- Language family: Indo-European: Indo-Iranian; Iranian; Northeastern; Sogdo-Bactrian; Sogdic; Yaghnobi
- Early form: Sogdian
- Dialects: Eastern Yaghnobi; Western Yaghnobi
- Writing system: Cyrillic script Latin script Perso-Arabic script

Official status
- Recognised minority language in: Tajikistan

Language codes
- ISO 639-3: yai
- Glottolog: yagn1238
- ELP: Yaghnobi
- Linguasphere: 58-ABC-a
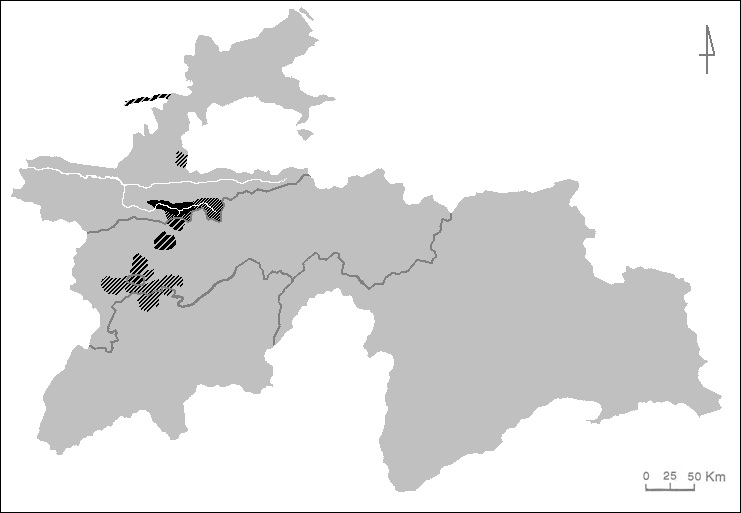
- Yaghnobi-speaking areas and enclaves of Yaghnobi-speakers among a Tajik majority

- Yaghnobi is classified as Definitely Endangered by the UNESCO Atlas of the World's Languages in Danger (2010)

Yaghnobi (Note: Also rendered as Yaghnabi, Yagnobi or Yagnabi; endonym: Яғнобӣ зивок, romanized: Yaɣnobī́ zivók, pronounced [jaʁnɔːˈbiː zɪ̆ˈvoːkʰ]; Tajik: Забони яғнобӣ, romanized: Zaboni yaghnobī, pronounced [zɐˈbɔːnɪ jɐʁnɔːˈbiː]) (Note: Linguistic abbreviation: YAGH) is an Eastern Iranian language spoken in the upper valley of the Yaghnob River in the Zarafshan area of Tajikistan by the Yaghnobi people. It is considered to be a direct descendant of Sogdian or closely related to it and has sometimes been called Neo-Sogdian in academic literature. There are some 12,500 Yaghnobi speakers, divided into several communities. The principal group lives in the Zafarobod area. There are also resettlers in the Yaghnob Valley. Some communities live in the villages of Zumand and Kůkteppa and in Dushanbe or its vicinity.

Most Yaghnobi speakers are bilingual in Tajik, a dialect of Persian. Yaghnobi is mostly used for daily family communication, and Tajik is used by Yaghnobi-speakers for business and formal transactions. A Russian ethnographer was told by nearby Tajiks, long hostile to the Yaghnobis, who were late to adopt Islam, that the Yaghnobis used their language as a "secret" mode of communication to confuse the Tajiks. The account led to the assumption by some that Yaghnobi or some derivative of it was used as a secret code.

The language is taught in elementary school within the ethnic community, and Tajikistan has also enacted legislation to support education in minority languages, including Yaghnobi.

== Dialects ==
There are two main dialects: a western and an eastern one. They differ primarily in phonetics. For example, historical *θ corresponds to t in the western dialects and s in the eastern: met – mes 'day' from Sogdian mēθ ⟨myθ⟩. Western ay corresponds to Eastern e: wayš – weš 'grass' from Sogdian wayš or wēš ⟨wyš⟩. The early Sogdian group θr (later ṣ̌) is reflected as sar in the east but tir in the west: saráy – tiráy 'three' from Sogdian θrē/θray or ṣ̌ē/ṣ̌ay ⟨δry⟩. There are also some differences in verbal endings and the lexicon. In between the two main dialects is a transitional dialect that shares some features of both other dialects.

== Writing ==
Yaghnobi was mostly unwritten until recent times, but according to Andreyev, some of the Yaghnobi scholars used the Persian script for writing the language before 1928, mainly when they needed to hide some information from the Tajiks.

Nowadays, the language is largely transcribed by scholars using a modified Latin alphabet, with the following symbols:

a (á)	b	č	d	e (é)	f	g
ɣ	h	ḥ	i (í)	ī (ī́)	ǰ	k
q	l	m (m̃)	n (ñ)	o (ó)	p	r
s	š	t	u (ú)	ū (ū́)	ʏ (ʏ́)	v
w (u̯)	x	x°	y	z	ž	

In the 1990s, Sayfiddin Mirzozoda of the Tajik Academy of Sciences introduced a modified Tajik alphabet for writing Yaghnobi, in addition to several textbooks intended to for elementary school students. The shared orthography between Tajik and Yaghnobi transliterated according to Mirzozoda’s scheme offered the promise of improved literacy among Tajik-literate Yaghnobi youth, but since 2006 the Tajik government has stopped providing funding for the printing of Yaghnobi textbooks and the hiring of teachers of Yaghnobi, and so these efforts have largely stagnated. Additionally, Mirzozoda's method of transliteration presents a few notable drawbacks in that it does not distinguish between the short and long forms of every vowel, it does not distinguish between [v] and [β], and it has no inherent markings for the indication of stress, as can be seen in Mirzozoda's alphabet, reproduced with its IPA correspondences in this table below.

А а ([a], [aː])	Б б ([b])	В в ([v], [β])	Г г ([g])	Ғ ғ ([ʁ])	Д д ([d])	Е е ([e], [eː])
Ё ё ([jo], [joː])	Ж ж ([ʒ])	З з ([z])	И и ([i])	Ӣ ӣ ([iː])	й ([i̯])	К к ([k])
Қ қ ([q])	Л л ([l])	М м ([m])	Н н ([n])	О о ([o], [oː])	П п ([p])	Р р ([r])
С с ([s])	Т т ([t])	У у ([u])	Ӯ ӯ ([uː])	Ф ф ([f])	Х х ([x])	Ҳ ҳ ([ħ])
Ч ч ([t͡ʃ])	Ҷ ҷ ([d͡ʒ])	Ш ш ([ʃ])	Ю ю ([ju], [juː])	Я я ([ja])	Ъ ъ ([ʕ])	

=== Cyrillic script ===
The Yaghnobi Alphabet was same as Tajik but with Ԝ.

А а	Б б	В в	Ԝ ԝ	Г г	Ғ ғ
Д д	Е е	Ё ё	Ж ж	З з	И и
Ӣ ӣ	Й й	К к	Қ қ	Л л	М м
Н н	О о	П п	Р р	С с	Т т
У у	Ӯ ӯ	Ф ф	Х х	Ҳ ҳ	Ч ч
Ҷ ҷ	Ш ш	Ъ ъ	Э э	Ю ю	Я я

Notes to Cyrillic:

1. The letter й never appears at the beginning of a word. Words beginning with ya-, yo- and yu-/yū-/yʏ are written as я-, ё- and ю-, and the combinations are written in the middle of the word: viyóra is виёра [vɪ̆ˈjoːra].
2. Use of ӣ and ӯ is uncertain, but they seem to distinguish two similar-sounding words: иранка and ӣранка, рупак and рӯпак. Perhaps ӣ is also used as a stress marker as it is also in Tajik, and ӯ can also be used in Tajik loanwords to indicate a Tajik vowel ⟨ů⟩ [ɵː], but it can have some other unknown use.
3. In older texts, the alphabet did not use letters Ъ ъ and Э э. Instead of Tajik ъ, Yaghnobi ’ and е covered both Tajik е and э for /e/. Later, the letters were integrated into the alphabet so the older етк was changed into этк to represent the pronunciation [ˈeːtkʰ] (and not *[ˈjeːtkʰ]). Older ша’мак was changed to шаъмак [ʃʲɑʕˈmak].
4. /je/ and /ji/ are written е and и. Yaghnobi и can be */ji/ after a vowel like in Tajik, and ӣ after a vowel is */jiː/. Also, е has two values: word-initially and after a vowel, it is pronounced [jeː], but after a consonant, it is [eː]. /je/ is rare in Yaghnobi and is only in Tajik or Russian loans, the only example for /je/ is Европа [ˈjeːvrɔpa], a Russian loanword.
5. Russian letters Ц ц, Щ щ, Ы ы and Ь ь, which can be used in Tajik loans from Russian, are not used in Yaghnobi. They are written as they are pronounced by the Yaghnobi speakers, not as they are written originally in Russian: aeroplane is самолет/самолёт in Russian, written самолёт in Tajik and pronounced [səmɐˈlʲɵt] in Russian and in Tajik. In Yaghnobi, it is written as самалиёт and follows the Yaghnobi pronunciation [samalɪˈjoːtʰ] or [samajˈloːtʰ]. The word concert is borrowed from Russian концерт [kɐnˈtsɛrt] in the form кансерт [kʰanˈseːrtʰ]). Compare with Tajik консерт.

== Phonology ==
Yaghnobi includes 9 monophthongs (3 short, 6 long), 8 diphthongs, and 27 consonants.

=== Vowels ===
	Front			Back	
	short	long		short	long
Close	и /ɪ/	и/ӣ /iː/	у/ӯ /yː/	у /ʊ/	у/ӯ /uː/
Mid		е/э /eː/			о /ɔː/
Open	а /a/	а /ɑː/			

The diphthongs in Yaghnobi are /ai̯, ɔːi̯, ʊi̯, uːi̯, yːi̯, ɪi̯, ɔːu̯, au̯/. /ai̯/ only appears in native words in the western dialects, eastern dialects have /eː/ in its place, except in loanwords.

- The monophthongs have these allophonic variants:
  - /ɪ/: [i~ɪ~e]
  - /a/: [(æ~)a(~ɑ)]
  - /ʊ/: [(y~)u~ʊ~o]
  - /iː/: [iː]
  - /eː/: [ɛː~eː]
  - /ɑː/: [(aː~)ɑː]
  - /ɔː/: [(ɒː~)ɔː(~oː~uː)]
  - /uː/: [uː]
  - /yː/: [(uː~)yː(~iː)]
- /ɑː/ was the result of compensatory lengthening (/dʒɑːm < dʒaʕm < dʒamʕ/).
- In recent loans from Tajik [ɵː] and/or Uzbek [ɵ, ø] can also appear, but its pronunciation usually merges to /uː/.
- /yː/ is only recognised by some authorities. It seems that it is an allophone of /uː/, originating from historical stressed *ū, but historical *ō, changed in Yaghnobi to ū, remains unchanged. It seems that /yː/ is unstable, and it is not recorded in all varieties of Yaghnobi. It is often realised as [uː(j), uːʲ, ʊj, ʊʲ], as well as /yː/. By summary: *ū́ (under stress) > ū/ūy/uy/ʏ or ū, *ō > ū (вуз [vyːz~vuːz] "goat"; Tajik: буз, romanized: buz, Avestan: 𐬠𐬏𐬰𐬀, romanized: būza).
- Before a nasal, /ɔː/ can change to /uː/, e.g. Тоҷикистун [tɔːdʒɪkɪsˈtɔːn~tɔːdʒɪkɪsˈtuːn] "Tajikistan", нум [nɔːm~nuːm] "name".
- /eː/ is considered as a long vowel, however before /h, ʕ/, its pronunciation is somewhat shorter, and is realised as a half-short (or even short) vowel. Etymologically, the "short" e before /h, ʕ/ comes from older *i (there is an alternation e/i before /h, ʕ/) if the historical cluster *ih or *iع appears in a closed syllable, and *i changes to e. In open syllables, the change did not take place (that is similar to Tajik). The change can be seen in the verb dih-/deh-: infinitive [ˈdɪhak] vs. 3rd sg. present [ˈdɛ(ˑ)htʃɪ].
- In Yaghnobi dialects, there can be seen a different development of historical svarabhakti vowel: in the Western and Transitional dialects, it is rendered as /ɪ/ (or /ʊ/ under certain circumstances), but in the Eastern dialects it changes to /a/ (but also /ɪ/ or /ʊ/): *θray > *θəráy > W./Tr. tiráy vs. E. saráy but *βrāt > *vərāt > W./Tr./E. virót.
  When the second vowel is a back vowel, *ə usually changes to /ʊ/ in Western or Transitional dialects: *(čə)θβār > *tfār > *təfór > W./Tr. tufór (but also tifór) vs. E. tafór, *pδūfs- > *bədū́fs > W./Tr./E. budū́fs-. The later change appears also in morphology: verb tifárak (the form is same in all three dialects) has form in 3rd sg. present tufórči < *təfár- < *tfar- < *θβar-. The alternation /ɪ~a/ can be seen also in Tajik loans where an unstressed vowel can undergo this change: W./Tr. širī́k vs. E. šarī́k < Tajik шарик /š^{a}rīk/ "partner", W./Tr. xipár vs. E. xapár < Tajik хабар /x^{a}bar/ "news". The former svarabhakti vowels are often ultra-short or reduced in pronunciation, and they can even disappear in fast speech: xišáp /xišáp vs. xⁱšáp vs. xšap/ < *xəšáp < *xšap.
- The /a/ changes to /ɔː/ in verbal stems of type -Car- if an ending containing historic *θ or *t is added: tifár-, infinitive tifárak, 1st sg. present tifarómišt but 3rd sg. present tufórči (ending -či comes from older -tišt), 2nd pl. present W./Tr. tufórtišt E. tufórsišt, x°ar-: x°árak : x°arómišt : xórči : xórtišt/xórsišt (when /a/ changes to /ɔː/ after /χʷ/, /χ/ loses its labilisation). The change takes place with all verbs of Yaghnobi origin and also with older loans from Tajik. For new loans, a remains unchanged.: gudár(ak) : gudórči vs. pár(ak) : párči: the first verb is an old loan from Tajik guzaštan < guδaštan, the later a recent loan from parrīdan.

=== Consonants ===
		Labial	Alveolar	Post‐ alveolar	Velar	Uvular		Pharyngeal	Glottal
		Labial	Alveolar	Post‐ alveolar	Velar	plain	lab.	Pharyngeal	Glottal
Nasal		м /m/	н /n/						
Stop	voiceless	п /p/	т /t/	[c]	к /k/	қ /q/			
Stop	voiced	б /b/	д /d/	[ɟ]	г /ɡ/				
Affricate	voiceless			ч /tʃ/					
Affricate	voiced			ҷ /dʒ/					
Fricative	voiceless	ф /f/	с /s/	ш /ʃʲ/		х /χ/	хԝ /χʷ/	ҳ /ħ/	ҳ /h/
Fricative	voiced	в /v/	з /z/	ж /ʒʲ/		ғ /ʁ/		ъ /ʕ/	ҳ /h/
Approximant		ԝ /β̞/	л /l/	й /j/		ғ /ʁ/		ъ /ʕ/	
Trill			р /r/						

- /k/ and /ɡ/ are palatalised to [c] and [ɟ] respectively before a front vowel or after a front vowel word-finally.
- [ɦ] appears as an allophone of /h/ between vowels or voiced consonants.
- /m/, /n/ both have allophones [ŋ] and [ɱ] before /k, ɡ/ and /f, v/, respectively
- All voiced consonants are pronounced voiceless at the end of the word when after an unvoiced consonant comes a voiced one. Likewise, unvoiced consonants become voiced by assimilation. In voicing q, the voiced opposition is [ɣ], not [ɢ].
- The consonants /b/, /ɡ/, /h/, /ħ/, /dʒ/, /q/, /l/, /ʕ/ appear mostly in loanwords. Native words with those sounds are rare and mostly onomatopoeic.

== Morphology ==
W, E and Tr. refer to the Western, Eastern and Transitional dialects.

=== Noun ===
Case endings:

Case	Stem ending is consonant	Stem ending is vowel other than -a	Stem ending is -a
Sg. Direct (Nominative)	–	–	-a
Sg. Oblique	-i	-y	-ay (W), -e (E)
Pl. Direct (Nominative)	-t	-t	-ot
Pl. Oblique	-ti	-ti	-oti

Examples:

- kat: obl.sg. káti, pl. katt, obl.pl. kátti
- mayn (W) / men (E) : obl.sg. máyni/méni, pl. maynt/ment, obl.pl. máynti/ménti
- póda : obl.sg. póday/póde, pl. pódot, obl.pl. pódoti
- čalló : obl.sg. čallóy, pl. čallót, obl.pl. čallóti
- zindagī́ : obl.sg. zindagī́y, pl. zindagī́t, obl.pl. zindagī́ti
- mórti : obl.sg. mórtiy, pl. mórtit, obl.pl. mórtiti
- Also, the izofa construction is used in Yaghnobi and appears in phrases and constructions adopted from Tajik or with words of Tajik origin.

=== Pronouns ===
Person	Nominative Singular	Oblique Singular	Enclitic Singular	Nominative Plural	Oblique Plural	Enclitic Plural
1st	man	man	-(i)m	mox	mox	-(i)mox
2nd	tu	taw	-(i)t	šumóx	šumóx	-šint
3rd	ax, iš	áwi, (aw), íti, (īd)	-(i)š	áxtit, íštit	áwtiti, ítiti	-šint

The second person plural, šumóx is also used as the polite form of the second person pronoun.

=== Numerals ===
	Eastern Yaghnobi	Western Yaghnobi	Tajik loan
1	ī	ī	yak, yag, ya
2	dū	dʏ	du
3	saráy	tiráy	se, say
4	tufór, tafór	tufór, tifór	čor
5	panč	panč	panǰ
6	uxš	uxš	šiš, šaš
7	avd, aft	aft	haft
8	ašt	ašt	hašt
9	nau̯	nau̯	nu(h)
10	das	das	daʰ
11	das ī	das ī	yozdáʰ
12	das dū	das dʏ	duwozdáʰ
13	das saráy	das tiráy	senzdáʰ
14	das tufór / tafór	das tufór / tifór	čordáʰ
15	das panč	das panč	ponzdáʰ
16	das uxš	das uxš	šonzdáʰ
17	das avd / aft	das aft	habdáʰ, havdáʰ
18	das ašt	das ašt	haždáʰ
19	das nau̯	das nau̯	nūzdáʰ
20			bīst
30	bī́st-at das	bī́st-at das	sī
40	dū bīst	dʏ bīst	čil
50	dū nī́ma bīst	dʏ nī́ma bīst	pinǰóʰ, panǰóʰ
60	saráy bīst	tiráy bīst	šast
70	saráy nī́ma bīst	tiráy nī́ma bīst, tiráy bī́st-u das	haftód
80	tufór / tafór bīst	tufór / tifór bīst	haštód
90	tufór / tafór nī́ma bīst	tufór / tifór nī́ma bīst	navád
100	(sat)	(sat)	sad
1000			hazór

=== Verb ===
Personal endings – present:

Person	Singular	Plural
1st	-omišt	-īmišt
2nd	-īšt	-tišt (W, Tr.), -sišt (E)
3rd	-tišt (W), -či (E, Tr.)	-ošt

Personal endings – preterite (with augment a-):

Person	Singular	Plural
1st	a- -im	a- -om (W), a- -īm (E, Tr.)
2nd	a- -ī	a- -ti (W, Tr.), a- -si (E)
3rd	a- –	a- -or

By adding the ending -išt (-št after a vowel; but -or+išt > -ošt) to the preterite, the durative preterite is formed.

The present participle is formed by adding -na to the verbal stem. Past participle (or perfect participle) is formed by addition of -ta to the stem.

The infinitive is formed by addition of ending -ak to the verbal stem.

Negation is formed by prefix na-, in combination with augment in preterite it changes to nē-.

The copula is this:

Person	Singular	Plural
1st	īm	om
2nd	išt	ot (W, Tr.), os (E)
3rd	ast, -x, xast, ásti, xásti	or

== Lexicon ==
Knowledge of Yaghnobi lexicon comes from three main works: from a Yaghnobi–Russian dictionary presented in Yaghnobi Texts by Andreyev and Peščereva and then from a supplementary word list presented in Yaghnobi Grammar by Xromov. The last work is Yaghnobi–Tajik Dictionary compiled by Xromov's student, Sayfiddīn Mīrzozoda, himself a native Yaghnobi speaker. Persian words represent the majority of the lexicon (some 60%), followed by words of Turkic origin (up to 5%, mainly from Uzbek) and a few Russian words (about 2%; through the Russian language, also many international words came to Yaghnobi). Only a third of the lexicon is of Eastern Iranian origin and can be easily comparable to those known from Sogdian, Ossetian, the Pamir languages or Pashto.

A Yaghnobi–Czech dictionary was published in 2010 by the Charles University Faculty of Arts.

== Sample texts ==
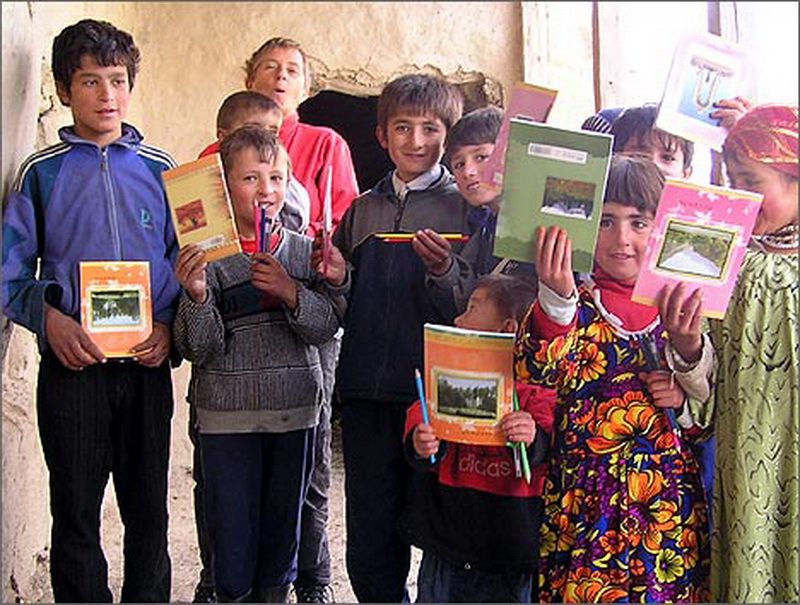
A group of Yaghnobi-speaking schoolchildren from Tajikistan

Latin	Fálɣar-at Yáɣnob asosī́ láfz-šint ī-x gumū́n, néki áxtit toǰīkī́-pi wó(v)ošt, mox yaɣnobī́-pi. 'Mʏ́štif' wó(v)omišt, áxtit 'Muždív' wó(v)ošt.
Cyrillic	Фалғарат Яғноб асосӣ лафзшинт ӣх гумун, неки ахтит тоҷикипӣ ԝоошт, мох яғнобипӣ. 'Мӯштиф' ԝоомишт, ахтит 'Муждив' ԝоошт.
IPA	[ˈfalʁɑratʰ ˈjɑʁnɔˑb asɔˑˈsiː ˈlafzʃʲɪntʰ ˈiːχ ɡʊˈmoːn ˈneːcʰe ˈɑχtʰɪtʰ tʰɔˑdʒʲiˑˈcʰiːpʰe ˈβ̞oːˀɔˑʃʲtʰ moːʁ jɑʁnɔˑˈbiːpʰe ˈmyːʃʲtʰɪf ˈβ̞oːˀɔˑmɪʃʲtʰ ˈɑχtʰɪtʰ mʊʒʲˈdɪv ˈβ̞oːˀɔˑʃʲtʰ]
Translation	In Falghar and in Yaghnob, it is certainly one basic language, but they speak Tajik and we speak Yaghnobi. We say 'Müštif', they say 'Muždiv'.

=== An anecdote about Nasreddin ===
Latin	Cyrillic	IPA	Translation
Nasriddī́n ī xūd či bozór uxš tangái axirī́n.	Насриддин ӣ хӯд чи бозор ухш тангаи ахирин.	[nasre̝ˈdːiːn ˈiː ˈχuːd ˈtʃɪ̞ bɔˑˈzoːr ˈʋ̘χʃʲ tʰaŋˈɟa̝jĕ̝ ɑχĕ̝ˈriːn]	Nasreddin bought a tubeteika at the bazaar for six tangas.
Kaxík woxúrdš avī́, čáwi apursóšt:	Кахик ԝохурдш авӣ, чаԝи апурсошт:	[cʰaˈχecʰ β̞ɔˑˈχʋˑrdʃʲ aˈve̝ː | ˈtʃaβ̞e apʰʋrˈsoːɕt]	Everyone he met asked him:
"Xūd čof pūl axirī́nī?"	"Худ чоф пул ахиринӣ?"	[ˈχuːd ˈtʃoːf ˈpʰuːl ɑχĕ̝ˈriːne̝ˑ]	"How much money have you bought the tubeteika for?"
Nasriddī́n ī́ipiš ǰawób atifár, dúipiš ǰawób atifár, tiráyipiš ǰawób atifár, aɣór:	Насриддин ӣипиш ҷаԝоб атифар, дуипиш ҷаԝоб атифар, тирайипиш ҷаԝоб атифар, ағор:	[nasre̝ˈdːiːn ˈiːjĕ̝pʰe̝ʃʲ dʒaˈβ̞oːb atʰĕ̝ˈfar | ˈdʋ̘je̝pʰe̝ʃʲ dʒaˈβ̞oːb atʰĕ̝ˈfar | tʰɪ̆ˈraje̝pʰe̝ʃʲ dʒaˈβ̞oːb atʰĕ̝ˈfar | ɑˈʁoːr]	Nasreddin answered to the first of them, he answered to the second of them, he answered to the third of them, then he said,
"Hámaipi ǰawób tifaróm, zīq vómišt."	"Ҳамаипӣ ҷаԝоб тифаром, зиқ вомишт."	[ˈhama̝jĕ̝pʰe̝ dʒaˈβ̞oːb tʰĕ̝faˈro̝ːm | ˈze̝ˑqʰ ˈvo̝ːmɪʃʲtʰ]	"If I answer to everyone, I will go crazy."
Ax xūdš či sarš anós, bozórisa adáu̯, fayród akún:	Ах хӯдш чи сарш анос, бозориса адаԝ, файрод акун:	[ˈaχ ˈχuːdʃʲ ˈtʃɪ̞ ˈsarɪ̆ʃʲ aˈnoːs | bɔˑˈzoːrɪsa aˈdau̯ | fai̯ˈroːd aˈkʰʋn]	He took the tubeteika off his head, ran to the bazaar, and cried,
"E odámt!	"Э одамт!	[ˈeː ɔˑˈdamtʰ]	"Hey, people!
Daràu̯-daráwi maydónisa šau̯t, īyóka ǰām vʏt!	Дараԝ-дараԝи майдониса шаԝт, ӣёка ҷаъм вӯйт!	[darˌau̯-daˈraβ̞e mai̯ˈdoːne̝sa ˈʃʲau̯tʰ | iˑjˈoːcʰa ˈdʒɑːm ˈvyːtʰ]	Go quickly to the square, gather somewhere over there!
Kattóti šumóxpi árkšint ast!"	Каттоти шумохпӣ аркшинт аст."	[cʰaˈtʰːoːtʰe̝ ʃʲʋ̆ˈmoːχpʰe̝ ˈarcʃʲɪ̞nt ˌastʰ]	The Big Ones have something to deal with you."
Odámt hamáš maydóni īyóka ǰām avór, áni šáhri hičúxs nàapiráxs.	Одамт ҳамаш майдони ӣёка ҷаъм авор, ани шаҳри ҳичухс наапирахс.	[ɔˑˈdamtʰ haˈmaʃʲ mai̯ˈdoːne̝ iˑjˈoːcʰa ˈdʒɑːm aˈvoːr | ˈane̝ ˈʃʲahrɪ he̝ˑˈtʃʋ̝χs ˌna̝ˀa̝pʰĕ̝ˈraχs]	Everyone had gathered somewhere at the square, no one else had remained in the city.
Nasriddī́n balandī́i sári asán, fayród akún:	Насриддин баландии сари асан, файрод акун:	[nasre̝ˈdːiːn balanˈdiːjĕ̝ ˈsare̝ aˈsan | fai̯ˈroːd aˈkʰʋn]	Nasreddin came upon a high place, and cried:
"E odámt, ɣiríft, nihíš xūd man uxš tangái axirī́nim."	"Э одамт, ғирифт, ниҳиш хӯд ман ухш тангаи ахириним."	[ˈeː ɔˑˈdamtʰ | ʁĕ̝ˈre̝ftʰ | nĕ̝ˈhe̝ˑʃʲ ˈχūd ˈman ˈʋ̘χʃʲ tʰaŋˈɟa̝jĕ̝ ɑχĕ̝ˈriːne̝m]	"Hey people, to let you know, I bought this tubeteika for six tangas."
