= Ayni District =

Ayni District Russian: Айнинский район Tajik: Ноҳияи Айнӣ
- District
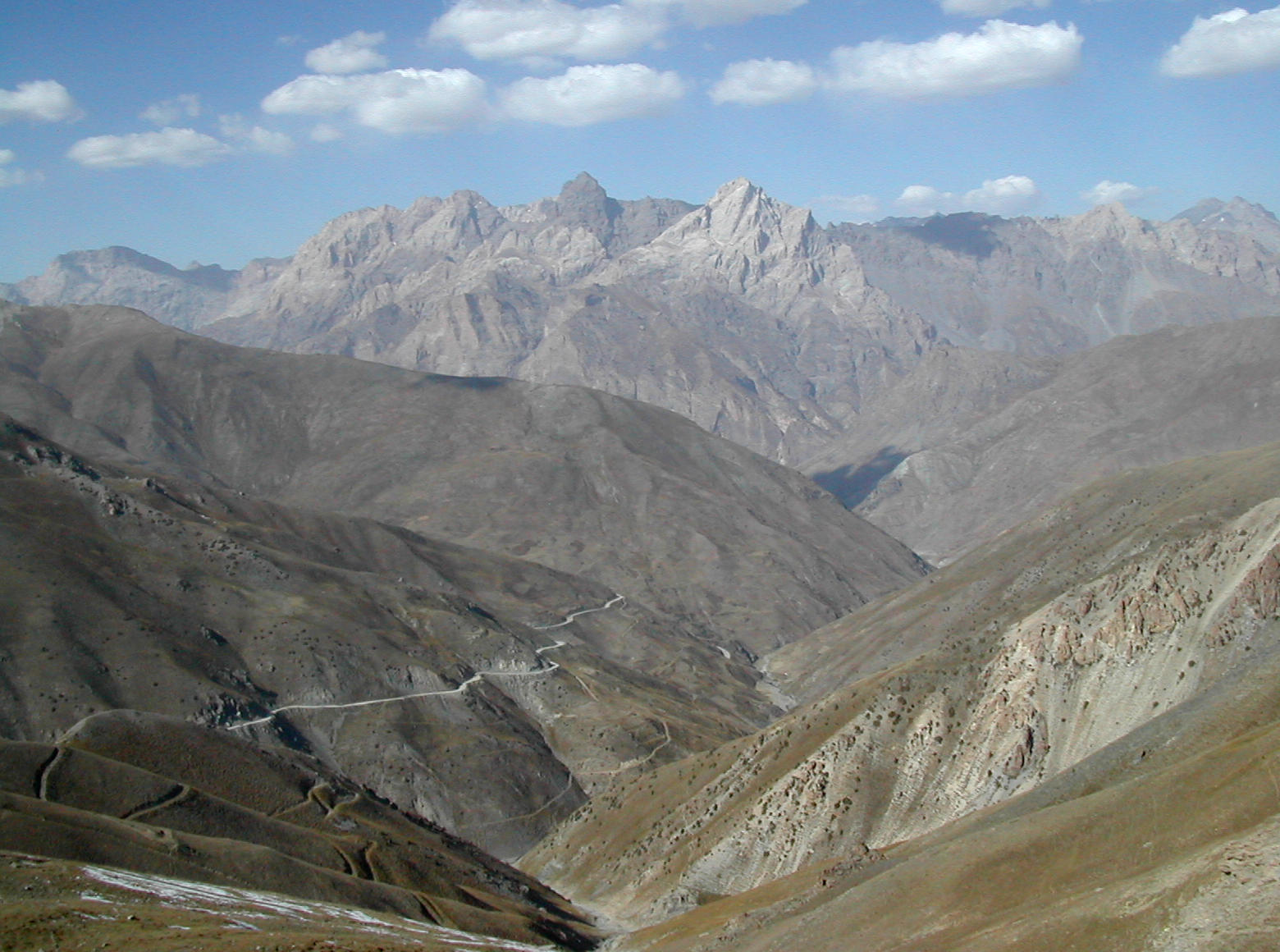
- Ayni District Landscape

- Location of Ayni District in Tajikistan
- Coordinates: 39°20′N 68°35′E
- Country: Tajikistan
- Region: Sughd Region
- Capital: Ayni

Area
  - Total: 5,200 km^{2} (2,000 sq mi)

Population (Jan. 2020)
  - Total: 83,600
- Time zone: UTC+5 (TJT)
- Postal code: 735520
- Area code: +992 3479
- Official languages: Russian (Interethnic); Tajik (State)
- Website: www.ayni.tj

Ayni District, also Aini District (Russian: Айнинский район; Tajik: Ноҳияи Айнӣ, Nohiyayi Aynī), is a district in the southern part of Sughd Region, Tajikistan, straddling the middle course of the river Zeravshan. Its capital is the town of Ayni (Tajik: Айнӣ), located on the Zeravshan. The population of the district is 83,600 (January 2020 estimate). It was named after the Tajik national poet Sadriddin Ayni (Tajik: Садриддин Айнӣ).

== Administrative divisions ==
The district has an area of about 5,200 km^{2} (2,000 sq mi) and is divided administratively into one town and seven jamoats. They are as follows:

| Jamoat | Population (Jan. 2015) |
|---|---|
| Zarafshan (town) | 2,200 |
| Anzob | 8,238 |
| Ayni | 14,862 |
| Dardar | 7,562 |
| Fondaryo | 9,478 |
| Rarz | 8,998 |
| Shamtuch | 6,557 |
| Urmetan | 18,016 |
