= Panjakent District =

Coordinates: 39°21′50″N 67°49′56″E

- District
- Location of Panjakent District in Tajikistan
- Interactive map of Panjakent District
- Country: Tajikistan
- Region: Sughd Region
- Capital: Panjakent

Population
  - Total: 230,000
- Time zone: UTC+5 (TJT)
- Official languages: Russian (Interethnic); Tajik (State) (Note: Constitution of Tajikistan)

Panjakent District or Nohiya-i Panjakent (Russian: Пенджикентский район; Tajik: Ноҳияи Панҷакент) is a former district in Sughd Region, Tajikistan. Its capital was Panjakent. Around 2018, it was merged into the city of Panjakent.

== Administrative divisions ==
The district was divided administratively into jamoats. They were as follows (and population).

Jamoats of Panjakent District
| Jamoat | Population |
| Amondara | 10486 |
| Chinor | 5384 |
| Farob | 6188 |
| Khalifa Hassan | |
| Khurmi | 7943 |
| Kolkhozchiyon | 14416 |
| Kosatarosh | 14421 |
| Mughiyon | 15271 |
| Rudaki | 15059 |
| Sarazm | |
| Shing | 9595 |
| Sujina | 10253 |
| Voru | 9968 |
| Yori | |
