= Changal =

Changal may refer to:

- Changal, Iran
- Changal, Tajikistan

One of the caste originating from group of sufi scholars
