= Urmetan =

Urmetan Урметан
- Town and Jamoat
- Location in Tajikistan
- Coordinates: 39°26′35″N 68°15′53″E
- Country: Tajikistan
- Region: Sughd Region
- District: Ayni District

Population (2015)
  - Total: 18,016
- Time zone: UTC+5 (TJT)
- Official languages: Russian (Interethnic); Tajik (State)

Urmetan (Russian and Tajik: Урметан) is a village and jamoat in north-western Tajikistan. It is located in Ayni District in Sughd Region. The jamoat has a total population of 18,016 (2015). It consists of 7 villages: Urmetan (the seat), Madm, Revad, Vashan, Veshkand, Vota and Yovon.

The village Urmetan is located along the RB12 highway between Ayni and Panjakent.
