= Kishtudak =

- Location in Tajikistan
- Coordinates: 39°28′38″N 68°7′42″E
- Country: Tajikistan
- Region: Sughd Region
- City: Panjakent

Kishtudak (Tajik: Киштӯдак) is a village in Sughd Region, northern Tajikistan. It is a part and administrative seat of Yori jamoat in the city of Panjakent. It is located near the RB12 highway.
