= Guytan =

- Location in Tajikistan
- Coordinates: 39°17′30″N 68°03′55″E
- Country: Tajikistan
- Region: Sughd Region
- City: Panjakent

Guytan (Tajik: Ғӯйтан Ghŭytan) is a village in Sughd Region, northern Tajikistan. It is part of the jamoat Voru in the city of Panjakent.
