= Kuhi, Tajikistan =

Kuhi
- Location in Tajikistan
- Coordinates: 39°10′46″N 68°0′16″E
- Country: Tajikistan
- Region: Sughd Region
- City: Panjakent

Kuhi (Tajik: Кӯҳӣ, formerly Khumorigung) is a village in Sughd Region, northern Tajikistan. It is part of the jamoat Voru in the city of Panjakent.
