= Zamchorroha =

- Location in Tajikistan
- Coordinates: 39°8′N 67°50′E
- Country: Tajikistan
- Region: Sughd Region
- City: Panjakent
- Official languages: Russian (Interethnic); Tajik (State)

Zamchorroha (Russian: Замчорроха; Tajik: Замчорроҳа) is a village in Sughd Region, northern Tajikistan. It is part of the jamoat Shing in the city of Panjakent.
