= Gaznich =

- Location in Tajikistan
- Coordinates: 39°13′53″N 68°2′43″E
- Country: Tajikistan
- Region: Sughd Region
- City: Panjakent

Gaznich (Tajik: Ғазнич Ghaznich) is a village in Sughd Region, northern Tajikistan. It is part of the jamoat Voru in the city of Panjakent.
