= Jilav =

- Location in Tajikistan
- Coordinates: 39°22′N 67°43′E
- Country: Tajikistan
- Region: Sughd Region
- City: Panjakent

Jilav (Tajik: Ҷилав, also Jaylav) is a village in Sughd Region, northern Tajikistan. It is part of the jamoat Kosatarosh in the city of Panjakent.
