= Jomchashma =

- Location in Tajikistan
- Coordinates: 39°22′8″N 67°41′22″E
- Country: Tajikistan
- Region: Sughd Region
- City: Panjakent

Jomchashma (Tajik: Ҷомчашма, formerly Jonbuloq or Dzhanbulak) is a village in Sughd Region, northern Tajikistan. It is part of the jamoat Kosatarosh in the city of Panjakent.
