= Yovon, Ayni District =

Yovon
- Location in Tajikistan
- Coordinates: 39°26′50″N 68°8′40″E
- Country: Tajikistan
- Region: Sughd Region
- District: Ayni District
- Official languages: Russian (Interethnic); Tajik (State)

Yovon (Russian and Tajik: Ёвон) is a village in Sughd Region, northern Tajikistan. It is part of the jamoat Urmetan in the Ayni District. It is located along the RB12 highway.
