= Zavron =

- Location in Tajikistan
- Coordinates: 39°22′N 67°55′E
- Country: Tajikistan
- Region: Sughd Region
- City: Panjakent
- Official languages: Russian (Interethnic); Tajik (State)

Zavron (Russian and Tajik: Заврон) is a village in Sughd Region, northern Tajikistan. It is part of the jamoat Loiq Sherali in the city of Panjakent.
