= Chorbogh, Panjakent =

Chorbogh Чорбоғ
- Location in Tajikistan
- Coordinates: 39°25′34″N 67°45′37″E
- Country: Tajikistan
- Region: Sughd Region
- City: Panjakent

Chorbogh (Tajik: Чорбоғ) is a village in Sughd Region, in northern Tajikistan. It is part of the jamoat Kosatarosh in the city of Panjakent.

== Name ==
Chorbogh in Persian means four gardens. Char/Chor(چار) means four and Bak(باغ) means garden.
