= Yeri =

Yeri may refer to:

- Yeri, Cyprus
- Yeri, Tajikistan
- Yeri (singer) (born Kim Ye-rim, 1999), South Korean singer and member of Red Velvet
- Yery (Ы, ы), letter of the Cyrillic alphabet
