= Zebon =

- Location in Tajikistan
- Coordinates: 39°23′N 67°34′E
- Country: Tajikistan
- Region: Sughd Region
- City: Panjakent
- Official languages: Russian (Interethnic); Tajik (State)

Zebon (Russian: Зебан; Tajik: Зебон) is a village in Sughd Region, northern Tajikistan. It is part of the jamoat Khalifa Hassan in the city of Panjakent.
