= Bedak =

- Location in Tajikistan
- Coordinates: 39°24′26″N 67°42′44″E
- Country: Tajikistan
- Region: Sughd Region
- City: Panjakent

Bedak (Tajik: Бедак) is a village in Sughd Region, northern Tajikistan. It is part of the jamoat Kosatarosh in the city of Panjakent.
