= Ganji Nihon =

- Location in Tajikistan
- Coordinates: 39°22′N 67°42′E
- Country: Tajikistan
- Region: Sughd Region
- City: Panjakent

Ganji Nihon (Tajik: Ганҷи Ниҳон, formerly Khirskhona) is a village in Sughd Region, northern Tajikistan. It is part of the jamoat Kosatarosh in the city of Panjakent.
