= Vagashton =

- Location in Tajikistan
- Coordinates: 39°18′00″N 67°47′30″E
- Country: Tajikistan
- Region: Sughd Region
- City: Panjakent
- Official languages: Russian (Interethnic); Tajik (State)

Vagashton (Russian: Вагаштан; Tajik: Вағаштон Vaghashton) is a village in Sughd Region, northern Tajikistan. It is part of the jamoat Shing in the city of Panjakent.
