= Dashtiqozy =

- Location in Tajikistan
- Coordinates: 39°27′54″N 68°2′50″E
- Country: Tajikistan
- Region: Sughd Region
- City: Panjakent

Dashtiqozy (Tajik: Даштиқозӣ Dashtiqozí) is a village in Sughd Region, northern Tajikistan. It is part of the jamoat Yori in the city of Panjakent.
