= Ghusar =

- Location in Tajikistan
- Coordinates: 39°27′53″N 67°50′44″E
- Country: Tajikistan
- Region: Sughd Region
- City: Panjakent

Ghusar (Tajik: Ғӯсар) is a riverside village in north-west Tajikistan. It is located in Sughd Region. It is the seat of the jamoat Loiq Sherali in the city of Panjakent.
