= Yori =

Yori may refer to:

- Yori (kana), in Japanese writing
- Yori, Tajikistan, a village in Tajikistan
- Connie Yori (born 1963), American basketball coach
- Yori (Kim Possible), a fictional character in the 2002–2007 animated series Kim Possible
- Yori, a character from the 1982 film Tron
- Kubing, a Philippine musical instrument
- Yori Asanagi, a fictional character from the Yuri series Whisper Me a Love Song
