= Khurramobod, Tajikistan =

Khurramobod
- Location in Tajikistan
- Coordinates: 39°30′51″N 67°33′30″E
- Country: Tajikistan
- Region: Sughd Region
- City: Panjakent

Khurramobod (Tajik: Хуррамобод, formerly Katta-Kishlak) is a village in Sughd Region, northern Tajikistan. It is part of the jamoat Khurmi in the city of Panjakent.
