= Zarrinrud =

- Location in Tajikistan
- Coordinates: 39°30′N 67°48′E
- Country: Tajikistan
- Region: Sughd Region
- City: Panjakent
- Official languages: Russian (Interethnic); Tajik (State)

Zarrinrud (Russian and Tajik: Зарринруд, formerly Qiziljar) is a village in Sughd Region, northern Tajikistan. It is part of the jamoat Amondara in the city of Panjakent.
