= Veshist =

- Location in Tajikistan
- Coordinates: 39°29′N 68°0′E
- Country: Tajikistan
- Region: Sughd Region
- City: Panjakent
- Official languages: Russian (Interethnic); Tajik (State)

Veshist (Russian and Tajik: Вешист) is a village in Sughd Region, northern Tajikistan. It is part of the jamoat Yori in the city of Panjakent.
