= Ven, Tajikistan =

Ven
- Location in Tajikistan
- Coordinates: 39°17′46″N 68°1′16″E
- Country: Tajikistan
- Region: Sughd Region
- City: Panjakent
- Official languages: Russian (Interethnic); Tajik (State)

Ven (Russian and Tajik: Вен) is a village in Sughd Region, northern Tajikistan. It is part of the jamoat Voru in the city of Panjakent.
