= Tahmina Rajabova =

Tajikistani actress (born 1982)

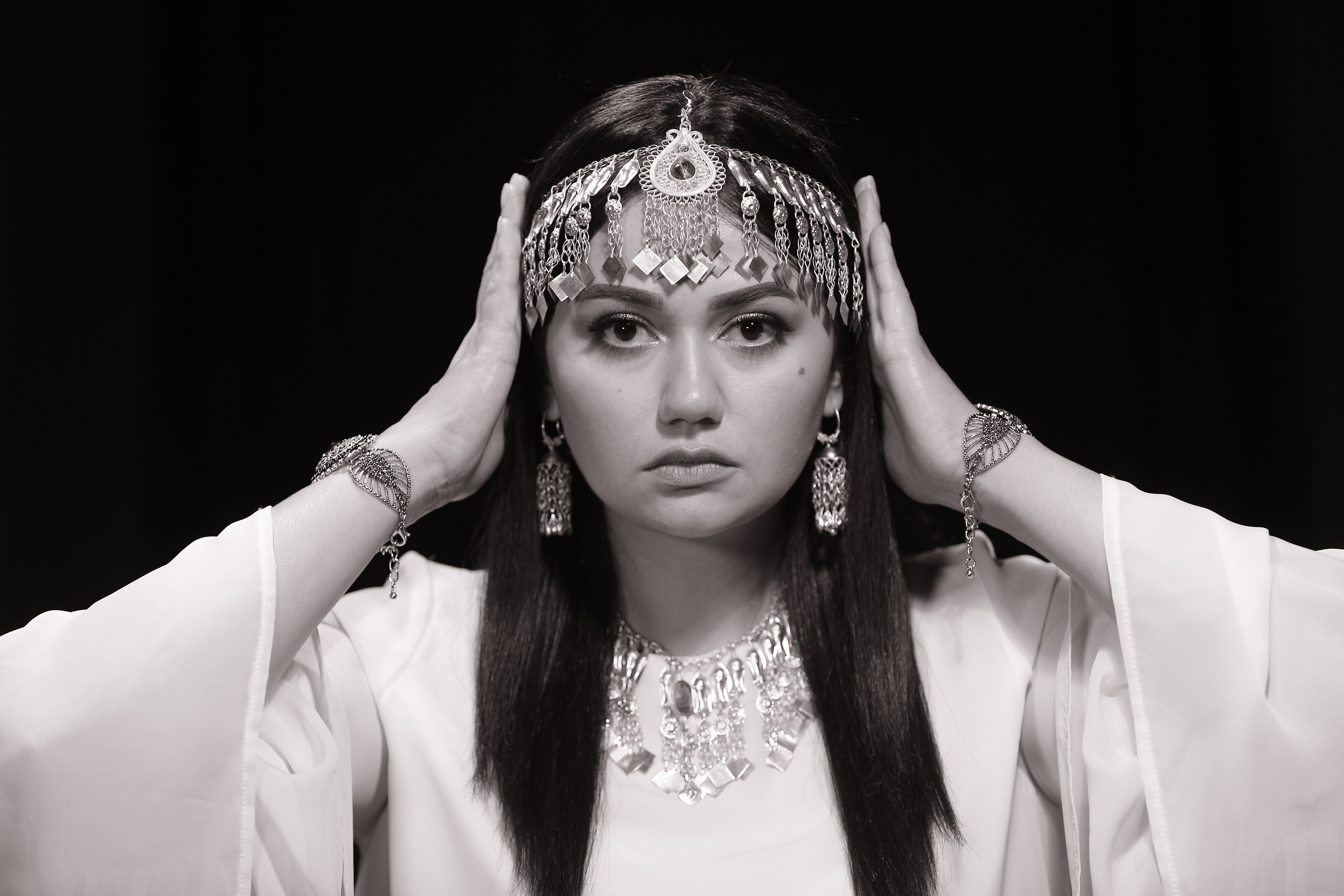
- Born: Rajabova Tahmina Pulodjonovna; June 29, 1982 (age 43); Dushanbe, Tajik SSR, Soviet Union
- Occupation: Actress
- Years active: 2007–present
- Children: Mohammedjovid

Tahmina Rajabova (Tajik: Раҷабова Таҳмина Пулодҷоновна, born June 29, 1982, Dushanbe, Tajik SSR) is a Tajik actress, journalist and newscaster. She was honored awards like “The Journalist of the Year” in 2013, “The award for distinguished contribution to the culture and art of Tajikistan” in 2013, and “The award of the TV and Radio Committee of Tajikistan” in 2017 and others.

== Biography ==
Tahmina Rajabova was born on June 29, 1982, in Dushanbe, Tajik SSR. Tahmina's father was an economist and her mother was a doctor. From 1989 she studied in a musical school named after Malika Sobirova until her third grade. As her father moved to Moscow due to his job, their family left the country. Tahmina went to a Russian school and studied there for two years.

After she returned to Tajikistan, Tahmina graduated the secondary school in Dushanbe, and applied to the faculty of law, Institute of international and regional relations of Moscow in Dushanbe. She married after she finished her first year in university; for this reason, she couldn't continue her studies and she had to drop out. After some time, she entered the Institute of Tax and Law of Tajikistan again and successfully graduated in 2006.

=== Personal life ===
Under the influence of her parents, Tahmina married when she was 18, but they divorced after three years. She has a son – Muhammadjovid. Later, Tamina married again and she has a happy family now. At the age of 18, Tahmina Rajabova married her cousin at her parents' request, but they divorced shortly afterward. She had a son, Muhammadjovid, from this marriage. In 2013, Tahmina met her future husband. In March 2015, he proposed marriage. Takhmina had a difficult decision due to her career and constant filming. In September 2015, she accepted his proposal and got married. In 2021, their son, Khalid, was born—a long-awaited child. That same year, she moved to Moscow with her young child to complete her studies at the Gerasimov Institute of Cinematography (VGIK). In 2023, she learned of her husband's infidelity. The distance between them began to fray. In May 2024, they officially divorced. "I paid a high price for my dream of becoming a director," Tahmina Rajabova said in an interview.

Tahmina shared this story in an interview with Orzu Isoev on the YouTube program "Noguftakho."

== Career ==
=== Television ===
Tahmina Rajabova started her career as a lawyer's assistant at Safina (national TV) in 2006; after a month Nasiba Gulamova (newscaster and, later, Tahmina's teacher) noticed her. Having a TV face and good Russian, Rajabova was offered a position as a news broadcaster, which she accepted. The movie directors noticed her on the TV, and counting her distinctive beauty, they offered her to star in movies.

=== Cinema ===
Tahmina debuted in her film career by starring as an assistant of the investigator in «I want to live» directed by Unus Usupov, and then in «The last hope» directed by Said Kadiri. Tahmina played the second role in this film and passed a serious test in the field of cinema. Subsequently, she was invited to the film studio of «Tajikfilm» in order to play the main role in «Difficult cross» of Saidjon Kadiri.

«The last hope» was awarded in the Cinema Festival «Didar» and some foreign movie directors showed interest in cooperation with Tahmina. One of them was Bulgarian movie director of Afgan origin - Asad Sikandar. Thus, she was invited to play the main role in Madrasa (now «Refugee») in collaboration with Bollywood actors in Afghanistan. Tahmina role was the mother of the family.

In 2011 Tahmina was invited to play a role of the third wife in “A man's desire for the fifth wife” of Canadian- Afghan movie director - Siddiq Obidi that was shot in Farob and Balkh provinces of Afghanistan. Tahmina played the role of the 3rd wife successfully and was rewarded the title of «The best actress» in International Film Festival of India.

== Humanitarian activity ==
International Federation of Red Crescent Societies in Tajikistan launched a monthly project to involve the society's attention to the humanitarian activities of the federation. Tahmina Rajabova was elected as the ambassador in this project. Tahmina says: “It was a pleasure to give orphans everything they needed for living. I visited orphanages even before and now a lot of children know me and call “apajon” (dear sister).

== Filmography ==
Tahmina Rajabova has starred in 20 films:

	Name	Year	Director	Role	Country
1	I want to live	2007	Unus Usupov		Tajikistan
2	A day of Spring	2008	Muzzaffar Rahmatov	Tahmina	Tajikistan
3	The last hope	2008	Saidjon Kadiri	Gulandom	Tajikistan
4	Appearance	2008	Umedjon Bobomurodov	Mahina	Tajikistan
5	Madrasa	2008	Asad Sikandar	Rohila	Afghanistan
6	An imaginary lamb	2009	Abdulhay Zokirov	doctor	Tajikistan
7	Difficult cross	2010	Saidjon Kadiri	Nigina	Tajikistan
8	Abase me senseless (parts 5-6)	2010	Shuhrat Kurbanov		Tajikistan
9	Bloody night	2011	Daler Bekov		Tajikistan
10	Coast	2011	Rajabali Pirov		Tajikistan
11	Following story	2011	Rustam Rasulov	Malika	Tajikistan
12	A Man's Desire for a Fifth Wife	2012	Siddiq Oboddi	3rd wife	Afghanistan
13	Revenge	2012	Ruslan Mirzoev	Zamira	Tajikistan
14	Journalist	2012	A’zam Roziq	Nigora	Tajikistan
15	Agreement	2013	Muhiddin Muzaffar	Malika	Tajikistan
16	Sleeping secrets	2013	Saidjon Kadiri		Tajikistan
17	12 years of waiting	2014	Muhiddin Muzaffar	Farishta	Tajikistan
18	Bad character	2014	Aslam Yodgorov	Parvina	Tajikistan
19	Investigator	2015	Muhammadrabbi Ismoilov	Nigora	Tajikistan
20	good deed (short film)	2016	Muhammadrabbi Ismoilov		Tajikistan
21	Star changes the colour	2018	Muhiddin Muzaffar	Sayora	Tajikistan
22	Edelways	2018	Ne’matullo Abdulloev	Erica	Tajikistan

== Cinema awards ==
In the International film festival of India (IFFI), Tahmina Rajabova was honored for her role in the film «A man’s desire for the fifth wife».
