= Ozodagon =

- Location in Tajikistan
- Coordinates: 39°31′12″N 67°36′6″E
- Country: Tajikistan
- Region: Sughd Region
- City: Panjakent
- Official languages: Russian (Interethnic); Tajik (State) (Note: Constitution of Tajikistan)

Ozodagon (Russian: Озодагон; Tajik: Озодагон, formerly Garibak) is a village in Sughd Region, northern Tajikistan. It is part of the jamoat Khurmi in the city of Panjakent.
