= Sharshara =

Sharshara Шаршара (Russian and Tajik)
- Location in Tajikistan
- Coordinates: 39°29′N 67°33′E
- Country: Tajikistan
- Region: Sughd Region
- City: Panjakent
- Official languages: Russian (Interethnic); Tajik (State)

Sharshara (Russian and Tajik: Шаршара, formerly Yaloqjar or Alakdzhar) is a village in Sughd Region, northern Tajikistan. It is part of the jamoat Chinor in the city of Panjakent.
