= Filmandar =

- Location in Tajikistan
- Coordinates: 39°22′56″N 67°45′37″E
- Country: Tajikistan
- Region: Sughd Region
- City: Panjakent

Filmandar (Tajik: Филмандар) is a village in Sughd Region, northern Tajikistan. It is part of the jamoat Kosatarosh in the city of Panjakent.
