= Ghizhdarva =

- Location in Tajikistan
- Coordinates: 39°18′N 67°51′E
- Country: Tajikistan
- Region: Sughd Region
- City: Panjakent

Ghizhdarva (Tajik: Ғиждарва) is a village in Sughd Region, northern Tajikistan. It is part of the jamoat Shing in the city of Panjakent.
