= Molla Babor Eshqi =

Molla Babor Eshqi (Persian: ملا بابور عشقی; 1792 – 1863) was a Central Asian poet from Panjakent, who wrote in Persian.

== Sources ==
- Bečka, J. (2020). "Ešqī, Mollā Bābor". Encyclopaedia Iranica Online. Brill.
