= Khurmi =

- Jamoat
- Location in Tajikistan
- Coordinates: 39°31′N 67°35′E
- Country: Tajikistan
- Region: Sughd Region
- City: Panjakent

Population (2015)
  - Total: 10,451
- Time zone: UTC+5 (TJT)
- Official languages: Russian (Interethnic); Tajik (State) (Note: Constitution of Tajikistan)

Khurmi is a jamoat in north-western Tajikistan. It is part of the city of Panjakent in Sughd Region. The jamoat has a total population of 10,451 (2015). It consists of 10 villages, including Khurramobod (the seat), Jangal and Ozodagon.
