= Madrasa (film) =

- Directed by: Asad Sikandar
- Written by: Asad Sikandar
- Produced by: Asad Sikandar; Rajesh Suvarna
- Starring: Asad Sikandar; Diana Sikandar; Tahmina Rajabova
- Cinematography: Ravikant Reddy
- Edited by: Abhishek Seth
- Music by: Abhijeet Hegdepatil
- Production company: Diana S Film
- Distributed by: Diana S Film (International)
- Release dates: July 6, 2013 (Kabul premiere); October 14, 2014 (Mumbai premiere)
- Running time: 78 minutes
- Country: Afghanistan
- Language: Dari

Madrasa is a 2013 Afghan drama film written, directed and co-produced by Asad Sikandar. The film, starring Sikandar, Diana Sikandar and Thamina Rajabova, is based on a true story about an Afghan refugee family living in Iran after having to flee the war in Afghanistan. The film released on 6 July 2013 in Kabul and on 14 October 2014 in Mumbai.

== Plot ==
The film tells the true story about Afghan refugee family living in Iran after war in Afghanistan. The film portrays an 8 year old Afghan girl Meena who wants to go to school, but circumstances and law in Iran don't allow her to do so. Her father Farhad goes to every extent so that his daughter can go to school and fulfill her dream of becoming a doctor. The story reaches a point where everything seems impossible but courage, love and sacrifice make their own statement.

== Cast ==
- Asad Sikandar as Farhad
- Diana Sikandar as Meena
- Thamina Rajabova as Rahila
- Farooq Sarkosh as Haji Agha
- Mohammad Sherzai as Ali

== See also ==
- Cinema of Afghanistan
