= Rudaki Republican Museum of Regional History, Panjakent =

Rudaki Republican Museum of Regional History
- Осорхонаи ҷумҳуриявии таърихӣ-кишваршиносии ба номи Рӯдакӣ; Республиканский историко-краеведческий музей имени Рудаки
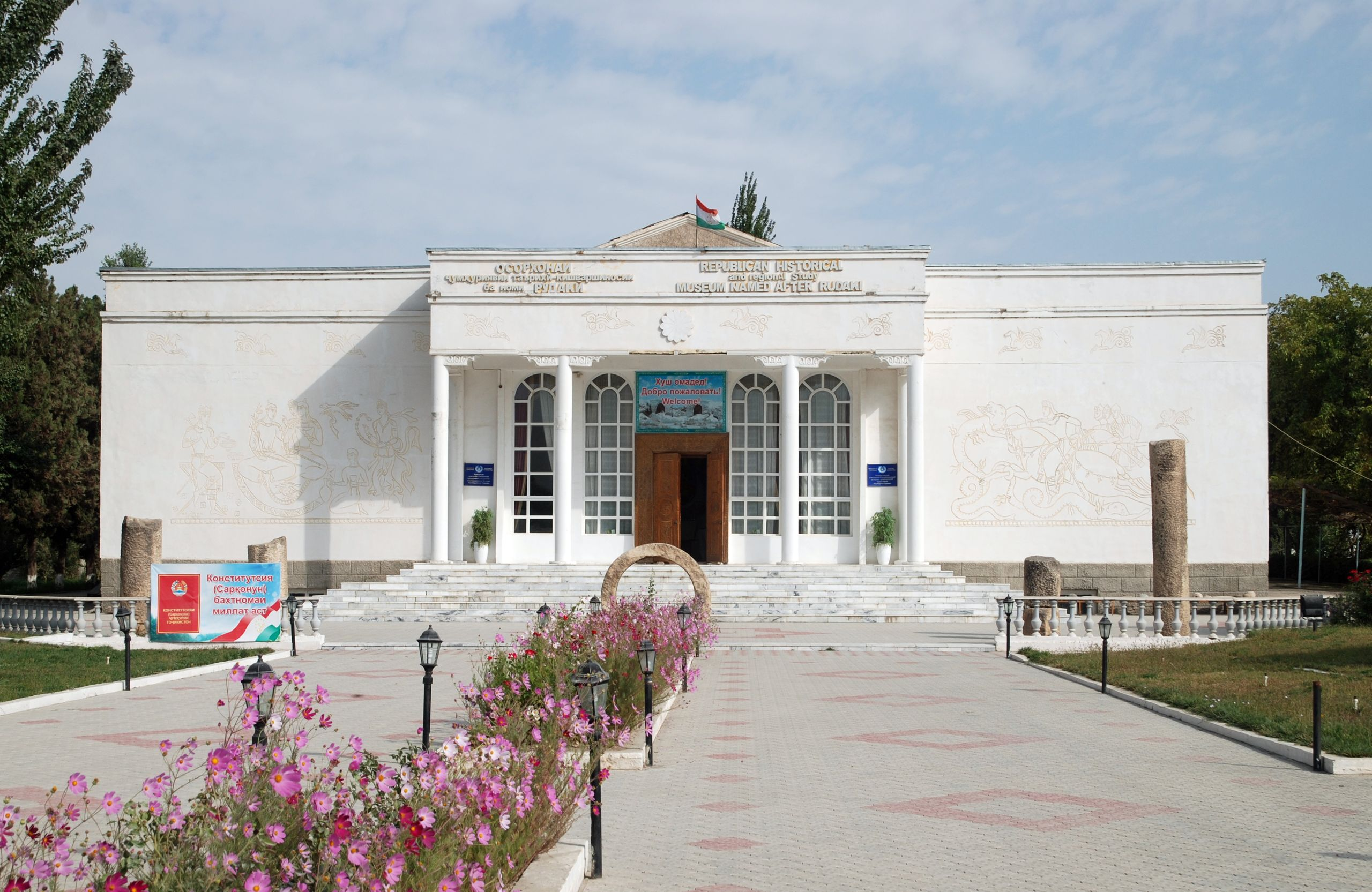
- Rudaki Republican Museum of Regional History
- Established: 1958
- Location: Panjakent, Tajikistan
- Coordinates: 39.4952°N 67.5963°E
- Type: history museum
- Founder: Tajik Soviet Socialist Republic

The Rudaki Republican Museum of Regional History (Tajik: Осорхонаи ҷумҳуриявии таърихӣ-кишваршиносии ба номи Рӯдакӣ, Russian: Республиканский историко-краеведческий музей имени Рудаки), known colloquially as the Rudaki Museum, in Panjakent in western Tajikistan is a museum named after Rudaki, a poet, singer, and musician who is regarded as the first major poet to write in New Persian born near Panjakent in the late 9th century.

== History ==
The museum was established in 1958, at the time when the Tajik Soviet Socialist Republic was one of the constituent republics of the Soviet Union, commemorating the 1100th birth jubilee of Abuabdulloh Rudaki. The museum features 8 exhibition halls and is organized into 3 departments. The museum holds a vast collection of artifacts discovered at the archaeological sites of Sarazm and Ancient Panjakent. These pieces share the history of the Sogdian civilization, the ancestors of many people in Panjakent today.

== Collection ==
The museum holds one of the largest collections in Tajikistan, featuring over 98,000 items, mostly consisting of archaeological artifacts from excavations in the Zeravshan Valley. The excavations, carried out since 1946 by the Hermitage Museum in collaboration with the Institute of History, Archaeology, and Ethnography of the Tajik Academy of Sciences, have uncovered artifacts dating from the Neolithic period to the late Middle Ages. In addition to its extensive archaeological collection, the museum features ethnographic exhibits that highlight the culture of the Tajik people in northern Tajikistan. The museum also houses documents and photographs that depict the political, social, cultural, and industrial history of the region from the 19th to the early 20th centuries. A special hall is dedicated to Rudaki, showcasing his life and works. The museum’s centrepiece is a fresco from ancient Panjakent, illustrating scenes of daily life and battles of the Sogdian people. Additionally, the museum holds religious artifacts that reflect Tajikistan’s Zoroastrian heritage.

== Architecture ==
The museum is housed in a specially constructed building in the center of the city. Its facade features two carved panels inspired by the frescoes of ancient Panjakent and displays Rudaki's famous saying: "There is no greater joy in the world than the sight of loved ones and friends". The Rudaki Museum features a central pillared entrance on a white-walled structure, with windows flanking the main door. The architectural style evokes a blend of a summer house and a mausoleum.

== See also ==
- List of museums in Tajikistan
