= List of museums in Tajikistan =

This is a list of museums in Tajikistan.

== Museums in Tajikistan ==
- Gurminj Museum of Musical Instruments
- Historical Museum of Sughd
- Tajikistan National Museum
- Panjakent Museum
- Tajikistan National Museum of Antiquities
- Konibodom Museum of History and Geography

== See also ==
- List of museums
