= Vashan, Tajikistan =

Vashan
- Location in Tajikistan
- Coordinates: 39°24′5″N 68°15′50″E
- Country: Tajikistan
- Region: Sughd Region
- District: Ayni District
- Official languages: Tajik (State)

Vashan (Russian and Tajik: Вашан) is a village in Sughd Region, northern Tajikistan. It is part of the jamoat Urmetan in the Ayni District.
