= Veshkand =

- Location in Tajikistan
- Coordinates: 39°26′46″N 68°19′39″E
- Country: Tajikistan
- Region: Sughd Region
- District: Ayni District
- Official languages: Russian (Interethnic); Tajik (State)

Veshkand (Russian and Tajik: Вешканд) is a village in Sughd Region, northern Tajikistan. It is part of the jamoat Urmetan in the Ayni District.
