= Revad =

- Location in Tajikistan
- Coordinates: 39°23′N 68°11′E
- Country: Tajikistan
- Region: Sughd Region
- District: Ayni District
- Official languages: Russian (Interethnic); Tajik (State) (Note: Constitution of Tajikistan)

Revad (Russian and Tajik: Ревад) is a village in Sughd Region, northern Tajikistan. It is part of the jamoat Urmetan in the Ayni District.
