= Vota, Tajikistan =

Vota
- Location in Tajikistan
- Coordinates: 39°25′N 68°8′E
- Country: Tajikistan
- Region: Sughd Region
- District: Ayni District
- Official languages: Russian (Interethnic); Tajik (State)

Vota (Russian and Tajik: Вота) is a village in Sughd Region, northern Tajikistan. It is part of the jamoat Urmetan in the Ayni District.
