= Konibodom Museum of History and Geography =

Museum in Tajikistan

Coordinates: 40.2930°N 70.4196°E

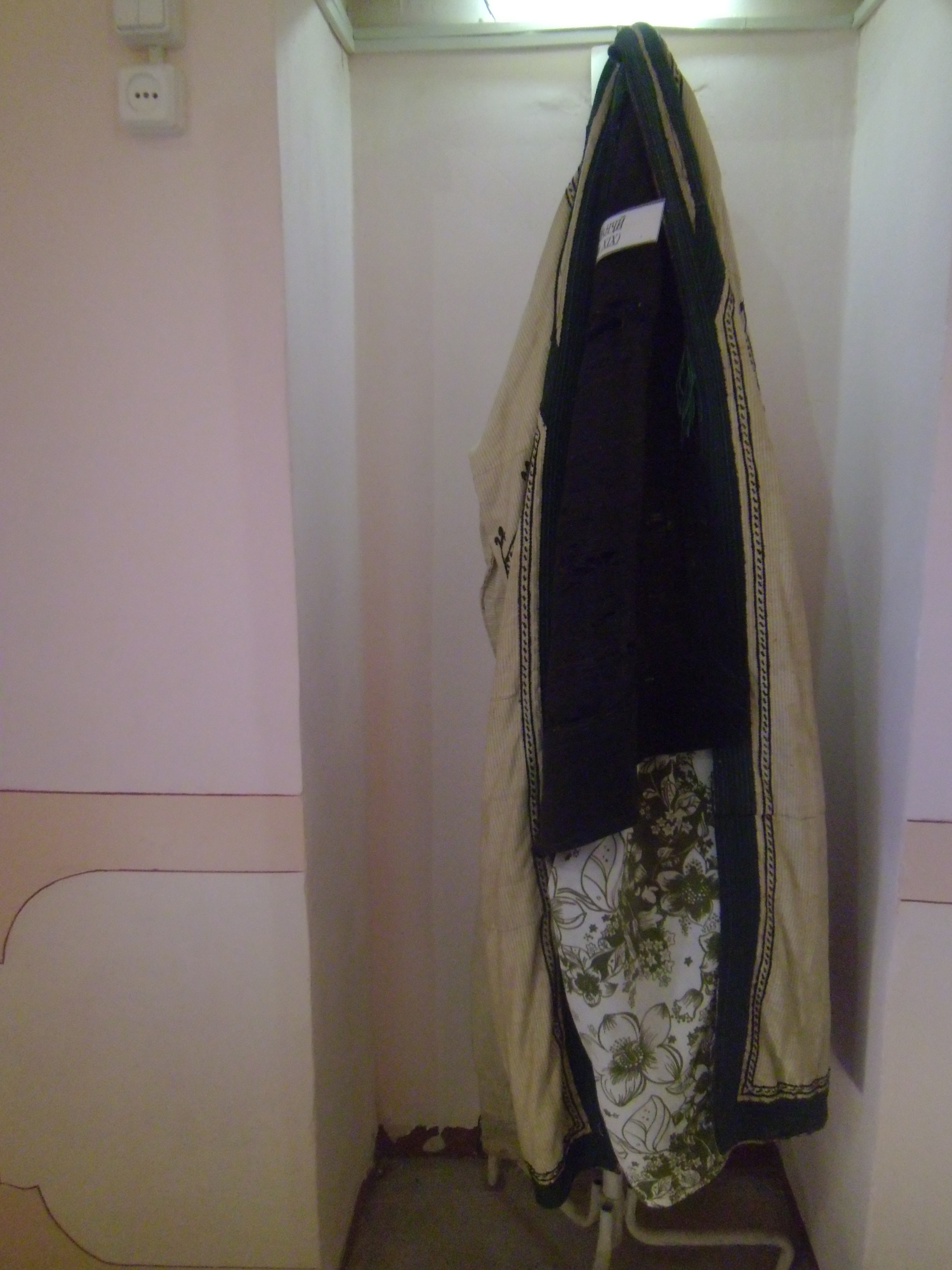
Tajik faranji on display in the museum.

The Konibodom Museum of History and Geography (Tajik: Осорхонаи таърихӣ-кишваршиносии шаҳри Конибодом) is a historical and local history museum in the city of Konibodom, within the Sughd Region of Tajikistan.

== History ==
It was established on the grounds of the Mirrajab-Dodkhoh madrasa, which is a historical architectural monument dating back to the mid-17th century. The madrasa was built in 1660 from mud brick in the traditional style and was intended to accommodate one hundred students. Between 1977 and 1983, it was renovated by local craftsmen. By the decision of the Executive Committee of the Council of Deputies of the City of Konibodom on December 7, 1983, it began operating in its current form. In 2013, the Embassy of the United States in Dushanbe established a project for the preservation and protection of the complex.

== Collections and exhibits ==
Today, the museum has 18 permanent halls. The museum contains over 6,000 items.

== See also ==
- List of museums in Tajikistan
