= Sarazm Important Bird Area =

Tract of land in south-western Sughd Province, Tajikistan

Coordinates: 39°30′43″N 67°34′15″E

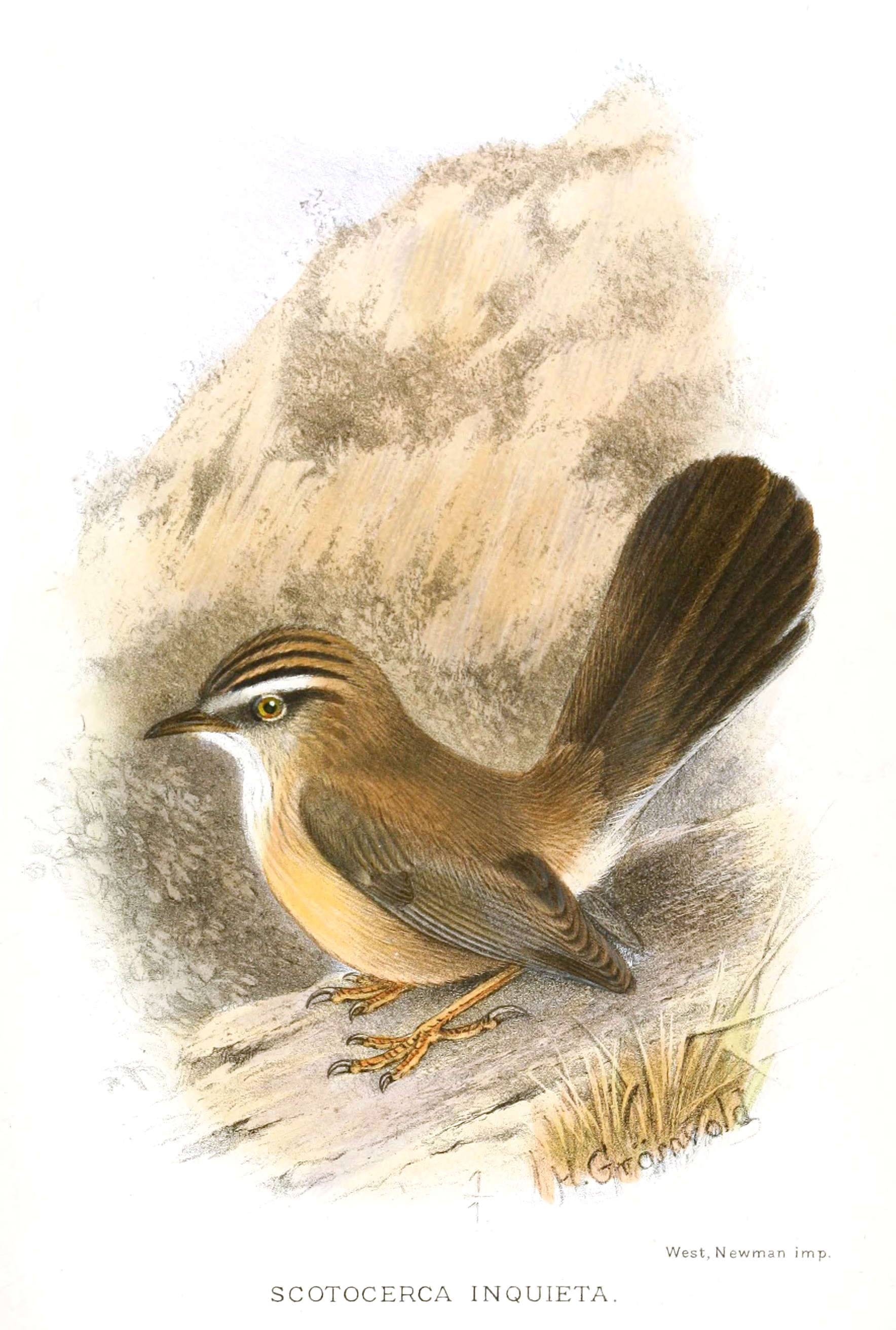
Streaked scrub warblers breed in the IBA.

The Sarazm Important Bird Area (Chinese: 萨拉子目重点鸟区) is a 43 km^{2} tract of land in south-western Sughd Province, in northwestern Tajikistan, not far from the border with Uzbekistan. It lies on the left bank of the Zeravshan River and overlaps the Zeravshansky Zakaznik (nature reserve).

== Description ==
The Sarazm Important Bird Area (IBA), identified as such by BirdLife International, encompasses part of the Zeravshan floodplain after the river has left the mountains and flows braided through a wide valley downstream of the city of Panjakent. It contains a range of temporary and permanent islands, many of which are covered with tugay, or flood-plain forest – comprising the only such ecosystem in northern Tajikistan. The soil is loamy-sandy, overgrown in moist areas with herbs, forming water meadows as well as dense thickets of trees and shrubs.

== Birds ==
The rich tugay vegetation provides favourable habitats for birdlife. The site was classified as an IBA because it supports significant numbers of the populations of various bird species, either as residents, or as breeding or passage migrants. These include saker falcons, pale-backed pigeons, Egyptian nightjars, European rollers, white-winged woodpeckers, great tits, streaked scrub warblers, Sykes's warblers and red-headed buntings.
