= Nigina Amonkulova =

Tajik folk singer (born 1986)

Nigina Amonkulova Нигина Амонқулова (Tajik)
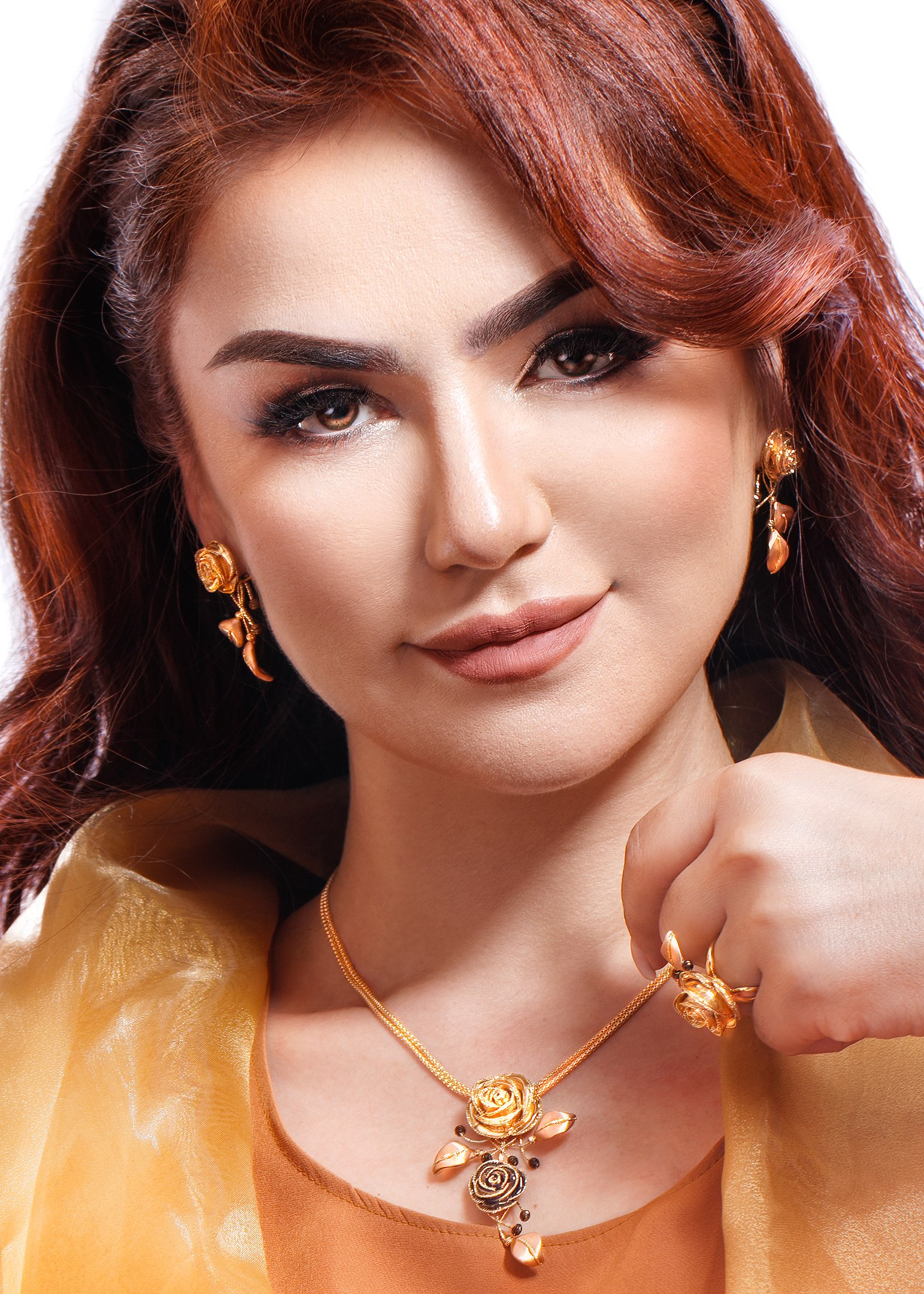

Background information
- Born: 30 January 1986 (age 40); Panjakent, Tajik SSR, Soviet Union (present Tajikistan)
- Genres: Folk
- Occupation: Singer
- Years active: 2008–present
- Label: Qiam Entertainment

Nigina Amonkulova (Tajik: Нигина Амонқулова, romanized: Negina Amanqolova; born 1986) is a Tajik folk singer, who performs in traditional dress. Tajik state television is nicknamed "Nigina TV" due to her frequent appearances. She sings traditional Persian songs from Iran and Afghanistan as well.

== Early life ==
Amonkulova was born in 1986 in Panjakent, Leninabad. She graduated from № 1 Panjakent High School and went on to study for three years at the Medical College in Pankakent. During her time at school and university she won several singing competitions.

== Career ==
Amonqulova's music became popular in 2008 with the success of the song "Ranjida nigoram omad". Her music is described as "pop-folk" and she often performs in brightly coloured national costumes. Collaborators include Sirojiddin Fozilov, Saidkul Bilolov, Sharif Bedakov, Farhod Zikir and Adiba Aziz. In 2020, she filmed the video for her single "Dario" in the Darvaz Nature Reserve. Tajik television is sometimes called "Nigina TV" due to her frequent appearances on it.

== Personal life ==
Amonqulova has four brothers: Khursed, a businessman; Khusrav, a singer; Khayyam, a wood-carver; and Hamidjon. She married her cousin Firuz in 2007.
