= Khalifa Hassan =

- Jamoat
- Location in Tajikistan
- Coordinates: 39°26′N 67°36′E
- Country: Tajikistan
- Region: Sughd Region
- City: Panjakent

Population (2015)
  - Total: 14,728
- Time zone: UTC+5 (TJT)

Khalifa Hassan is a jamoat in western Tajikistan. It is part of the city of Panjakent in Sughd Region. The jamoat has a total population of 14,728 (2015). It consists of 7 villages, including Zebon.
