= Kosatarosh =

- Village and Jamoat
- Location in Tajikistan
- Coordinates: 39°24′N 67°45′E
- Country: Tajikistan
- Region: Sughd Region
- City: Panjakent

Population (2015)
  - Total: 18,986
- Time zone: UTC+5 (TJT)

Kosatarosh is a village and jamoat in western Tajikistan. It is part of the city of Panjakent in Sughd Region. The jamoat has a total population of 18,986 (2015). It consists of 11 villages, including Novichomoq (the seat), Kosatarosh, Bedak, Jomchashma, Filmandar, Ganji Nihon, Chorbogh and Jilav.
