= Voru, Tajikistan =

Voru
- Village and Jamoat
- Location in Tajikistan
- Coordinates: 39°14′6″N 67°59′15″E
- Country: Tajikistan
- Region: Sughd Region
- City: Panjakent

Population (2015)
  - Total: 12,347
- Time zone: UTC+5 (TJT)
- Official languages: Russian (Interethnic); Tajik (State)

Voru is a village and jamoat in north-western Tajikistan. It is part of the city of Panjakent in Sughd Region. The jamoat has a total population of 12,347 (2015). It consists of 13 villages, including Rukhnobod (the seat), Voru, Gazza, Gaznich, Guytan, Kuhi, Ven, and Zimtut.
