= Loiq Sherali, Sughd =

Loiq Sherali
- Jamoat
- Location in Tajikistan
- Coordinates: 39°28′N 67°51′E
- Country: Tajikistan
- Region: Sughd Region
- City: Panjakent

Population (2015)
  - Total: 18,675
- Time zone: UTC+5 (TJT)

Loiq Sherali (Tajik: Лоиқ Шералӣ, formerly: Kolkhozchiyon) is a jamoat in western Tajikistan. It is part of the city of Panjakent in Sughd Region. The jamoat has a total population of 18,765 (2015). It consists of 7 villages, including Gusar (the seat), Navobod and Zavron. The jamoat is named after Lāyiq Shēralī, a prominent Tajik poet and iranologist born in this region (the village of Mazār-i Sharif) in 1941.
