= Jangal, Tajikistan =

Jangal Ҷангал
- Location in Tajikistan
- Coordinates: 39°31′23″N 67°30′11″E
- Country: Tajikistan
- Region: Sughd Region
- City: Panjakent

Jangal (Tajik: Ҷангал) is a village in north-west Tajikistan, part of the city of Panjakent in Sughd Region. It is a western suburb of Panjakent, located on the river Zeravshan on the border with Uzbekistan. It lies on the road from Panjakent to Samarkand.

The economy is primarily based on fishing and using the resources of the river.
