= Sujina =

Sujina Russian: Суджина Tajik: Сӯҷина
- Village and Jamoat
- Location in Tajikistan
- Coordinates: 39°29′N 67°43′E
- Country: Tajikistan
- Region: Sughd Region
- City: Panjakent

Population (2017)
  - Total: 16,543
- Time zone: UTC+5 (TJT)
- Official languages: Uzbek (local); Tajik (State)

Sujina (Russian: Суджина; Tajik: Сӯҷина) is a village and jamoat in western Tajikistan. It is part of the city of Panjakent in Sughd Region. The jamoat has a total population of 16,543 (2017), predominantly Uzbeks (Barlas)
