= Shing, Tajikistan =

Shing Шинг (Russian and Tajik)
- Village and Jamoat
- Location in Tajikistan
- Coordinates: 39°17′N 67°48′E
- Country: Tajikistan
- Region: Sughd Region
- City: Panjakent

Population (2015)
  - Total: 10,873
- Time zone: UTC+5 (TJT)
- Official languages: Russian (Interethnic); Tajik (State)

Shing is a village and jamoat in western Tajikistan. It is part of the city of Panjakent in Sughd Region. The jamoat has a total population of 10,873 (2015). It consists of 16 villages, including Shing (the seat), Gizhdarva, Vagashton and Zamchorroha.
