= Amondara =

Amondara Russian and Tajik: Амондара
- Village and Jamoat
- Location in Tajikistan
- Coordinates: 39°31′4″N 67°48′47″E
- Country: Tajikistan
- Region: Sughd Region
- City: Panjakent

Population (2015)
  - Total: 13,380
- Time zone: UTC+5 (TJT)
- Official languages: Russian (Interethnic); Tajik (State)

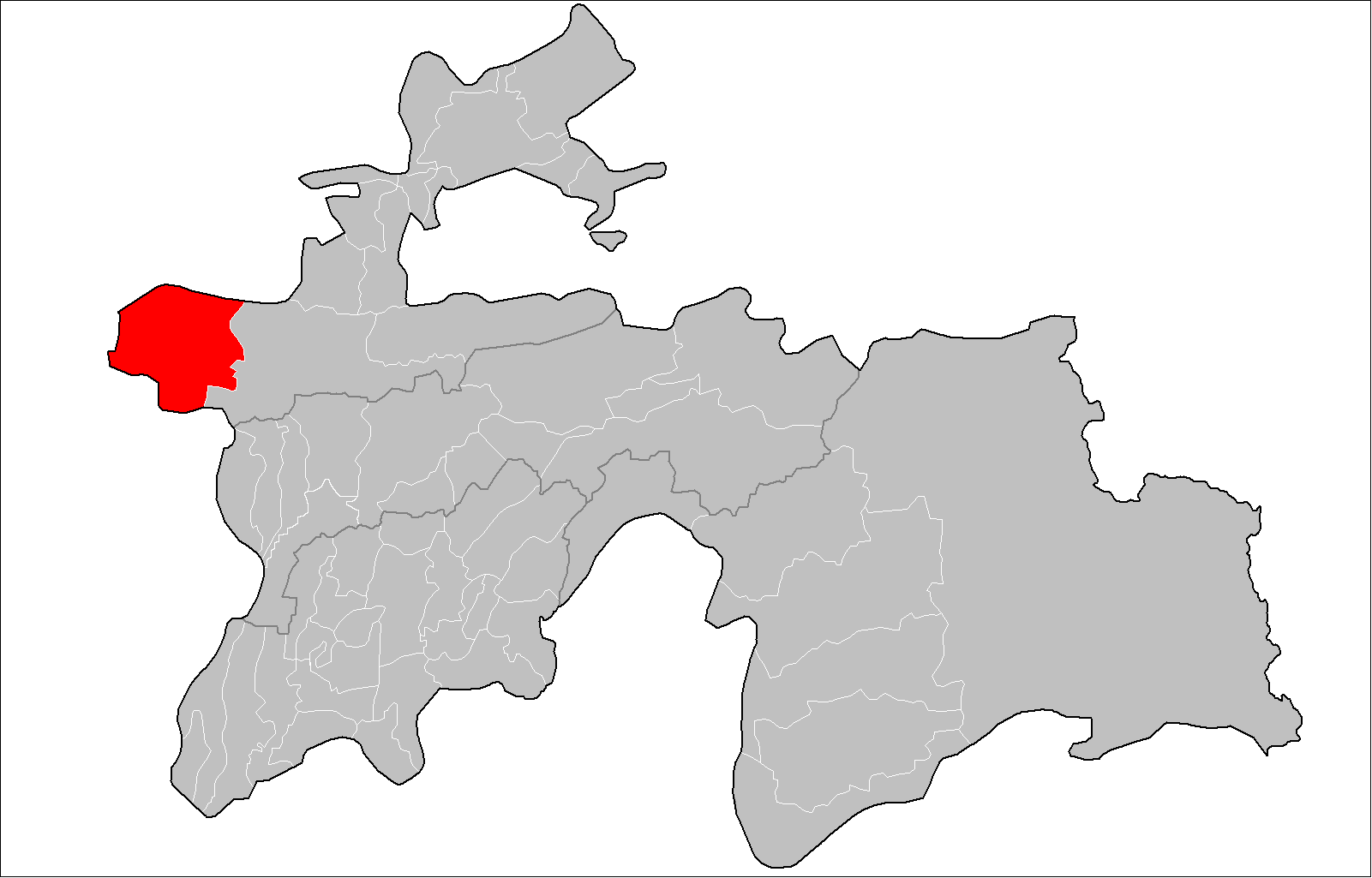
Location of Panjakent District in Tajikistan

Amondara (Russian and Tajik: Амондара) is a village and jamoat in north-western Tajikistan. It is part of the city of Panjakent in Sughd Region. The jamoat has a total population of 13,380 (2015). It consists of 10 villages, including Maykatta (the seat), Amondara and Zarrinrud.
