= Chinor =

- Village and Jamoat
- Location in Tajikistan
- Coordinates: 39°29′N 67°35′E
- Country: Tajikistan
- Region: Sughd Region
- City: Panjakent

Population
  - Total: 6,879
- Time zone: UTC+5 (TJT)

Chinor is a village and jamoat in western Tajikistan. It is part of the city of Panjakent in Sughd Region. The jamoat has a total population of 6,879 (2015). It consists of 5 villages, including Nuriston (the seat), Chinor and Sharshara.
