= Farob =

- Village and Jamoat
- Location in Tajikistan
- Coordinates: 39°14′27″N 67°28′12″E
- Country: Tajikistan
- Region: Sughd Region
- City: Panjakent

Population (2015)
  - Total: 8,650
- Time zone: UTC+5 (TJT)

Farob is a village and jamoat in western Tajikistan. It is part of the city of Panjakent in Sughd Region. The jamoat has a total population of 8,650 (2015).
