= RB12 highway =

The RB12 is a major highway of western Tajikistan. Travelling in an east–west direction, it connects the north–south M34 north of Ayni with the Uzbek border west of Panjakent. It is 113 kilometres (70 mi) long. In the former Soviet Union, the road was part of the longer A377 which continued to Samarkand.
