= Yori, Tajikistan =

Yori Russian: Ёри Tajik: Ёрӣ
- Village and Jamoat
- Location in Tajikistan
- Coordinates: 39°30′N 67°52′E
- Country: Tajikistan
- Region: Sughd Region
- City: Panjakent

Population (2015)
  - Total: 19,045
- Time zone: UTC+5 (TJT)
- Official languages: Russian (Interethnic); Tajik (State)

Yori (Russian: Ёри; Tajik: Ёрӣ) is a village and jamoat in western Tajikistan. It is part of the city of Panjakent in Sughd Region. The jamoat had a population of 19,045 in 2015. It consists of 11 villages, including Yori (the jamote's administrative seat), Dashtiqozy, Kishtudak and Veshist.
