= Panjakent =

City in Sughd Region, Tajikistan

Panjakent Панҷакент Пенджикент
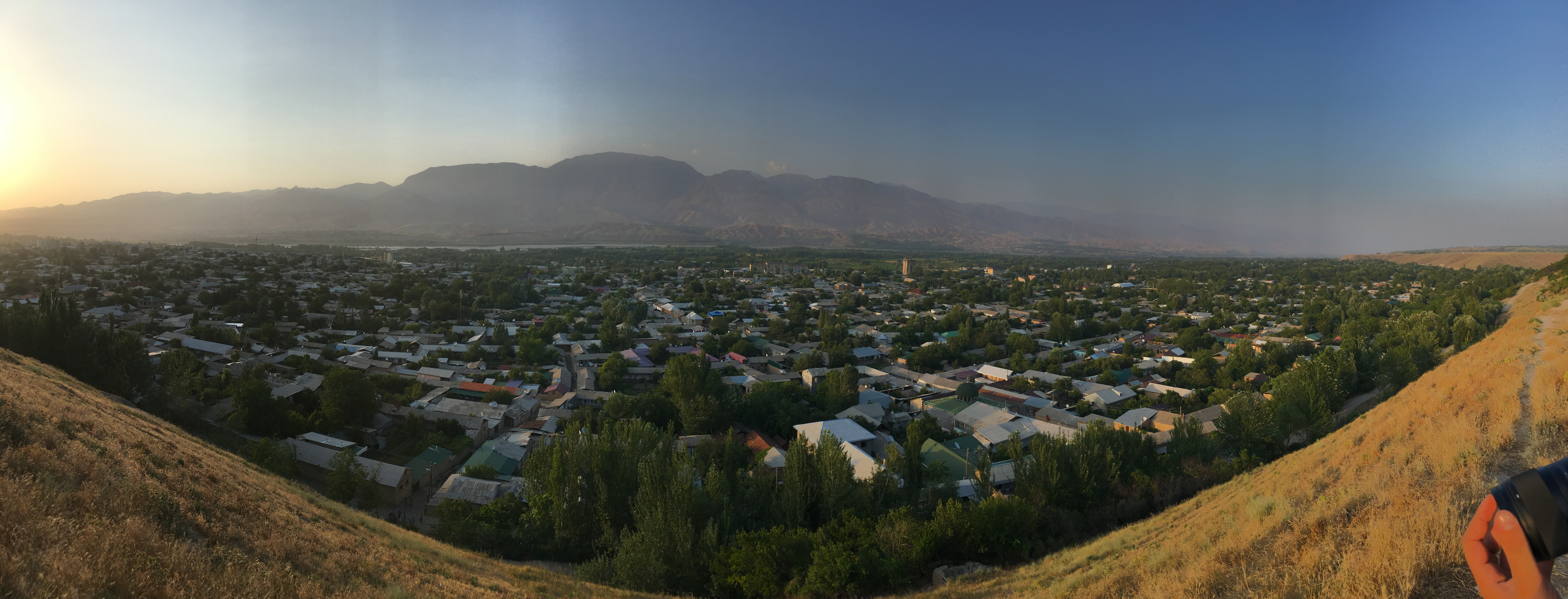
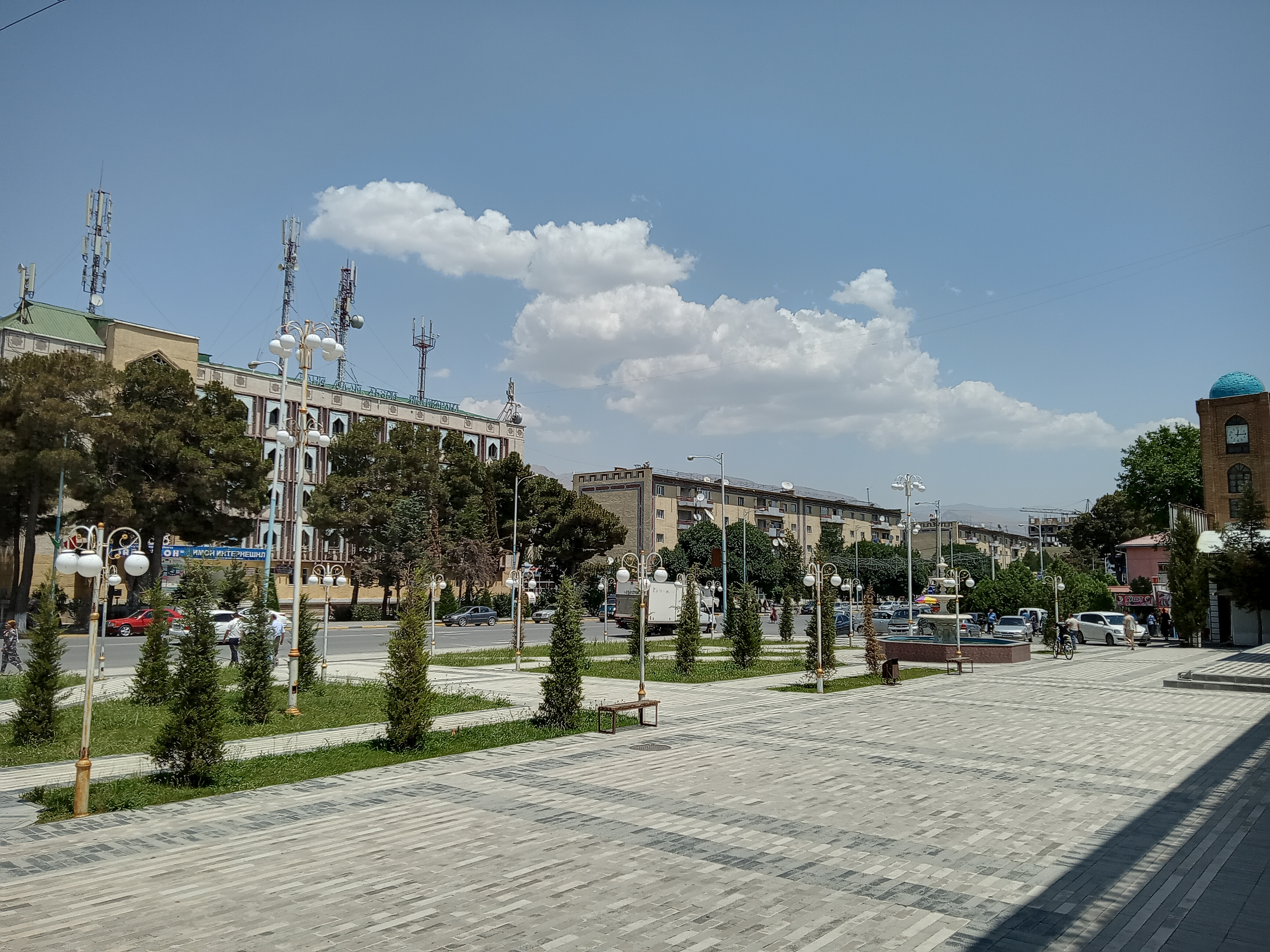
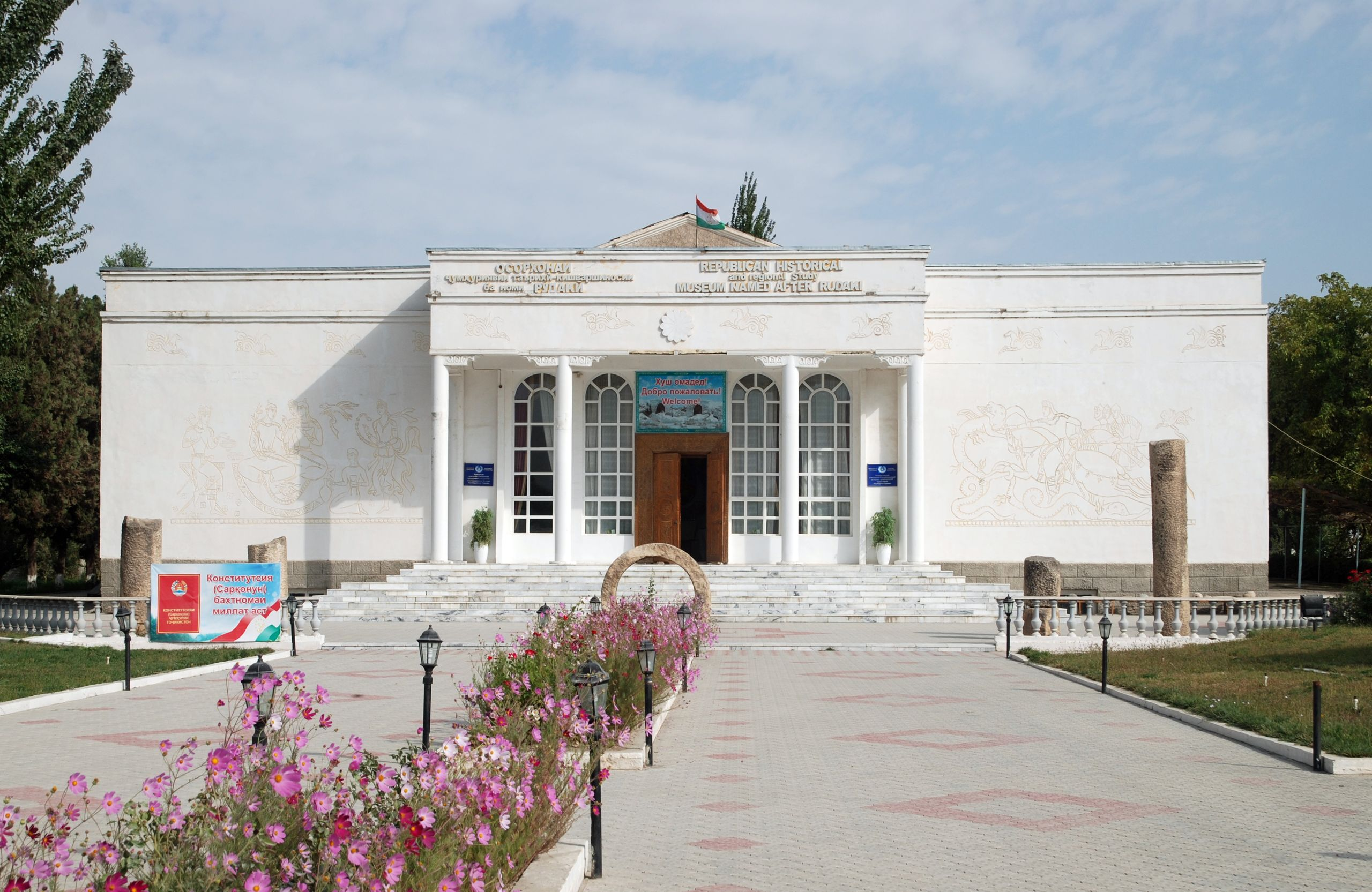
- View over Panjakent City center Historical Museum
- Interactive map of Panjakent
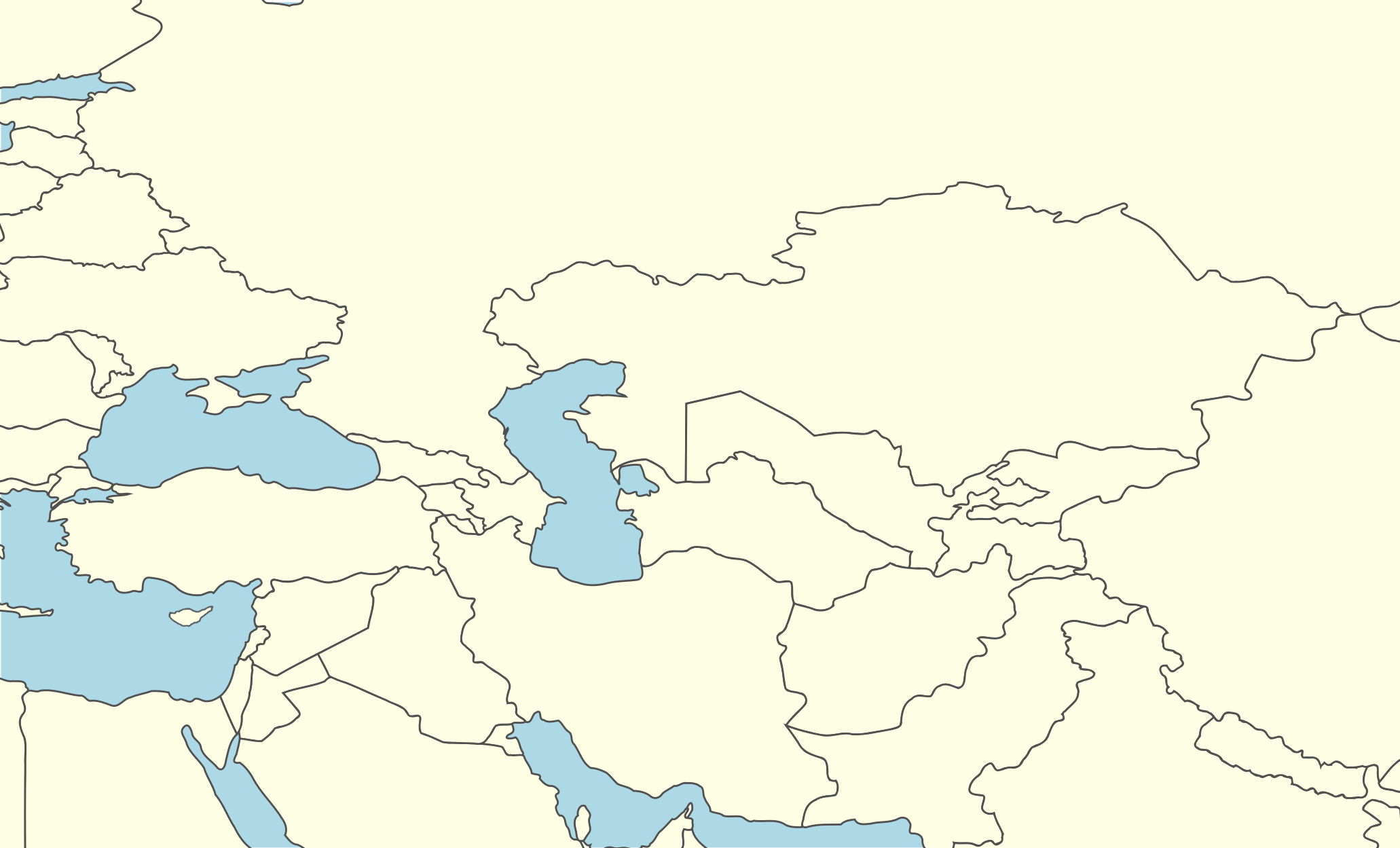
- Location of Panjakent Panjakent (Central Asia)
- Coordinates: 39.486769°N 67.619734°E
- Country: Tajikistan
- Region: Sughd Region
- Elevation: 996 m (3,268 ft)

Population (2020)
  - City: 303,000
  - Urban: 52,500
- Time zone: UTC+5
- Official languages: Russian (Interethnic); Tajik (State)

UNESCO World Heritage Site
- Part of: Silk Roads: Zarafshan-Karakum Corridor
- Criteria: Cultural: ii, iii, v
- Reference: 1675-006
- Inscription: 2023 (45th Session)

Panjakent (Tajik: Панҷакент) or Penjikent (Russian: Пенджикент (Note: Also spelled or romanized as Pendzhikent, Penjikent, Panjekent, Panjikent, etc.)) is a city in the Sughd province in western Tajikistan on the river Zeravshan, with a population of 52,500 (2020 estimate). It was once an ancient town in Sogdiana. The ruins of the old town are on the outskirts of the modern city. The Sarazm Important Bird Area lies downstream of the city on the tugay-vegetated floodplain of the river.

== History ==
Ancient Panjakent was a small but flourishing town of the Sogdians in pre-Islamic Central Asia. It was known as Panchekanth. The ethnic and territorial name "Soghd/Soghdian" or Sughd/Sughdian was mentioned in history as early as the Iranian Achaemenid dynasty (6th century BC). The Achaemenids founded several city-states, as well as cities along the ancient Silk Road and in the Zarafshan valley.

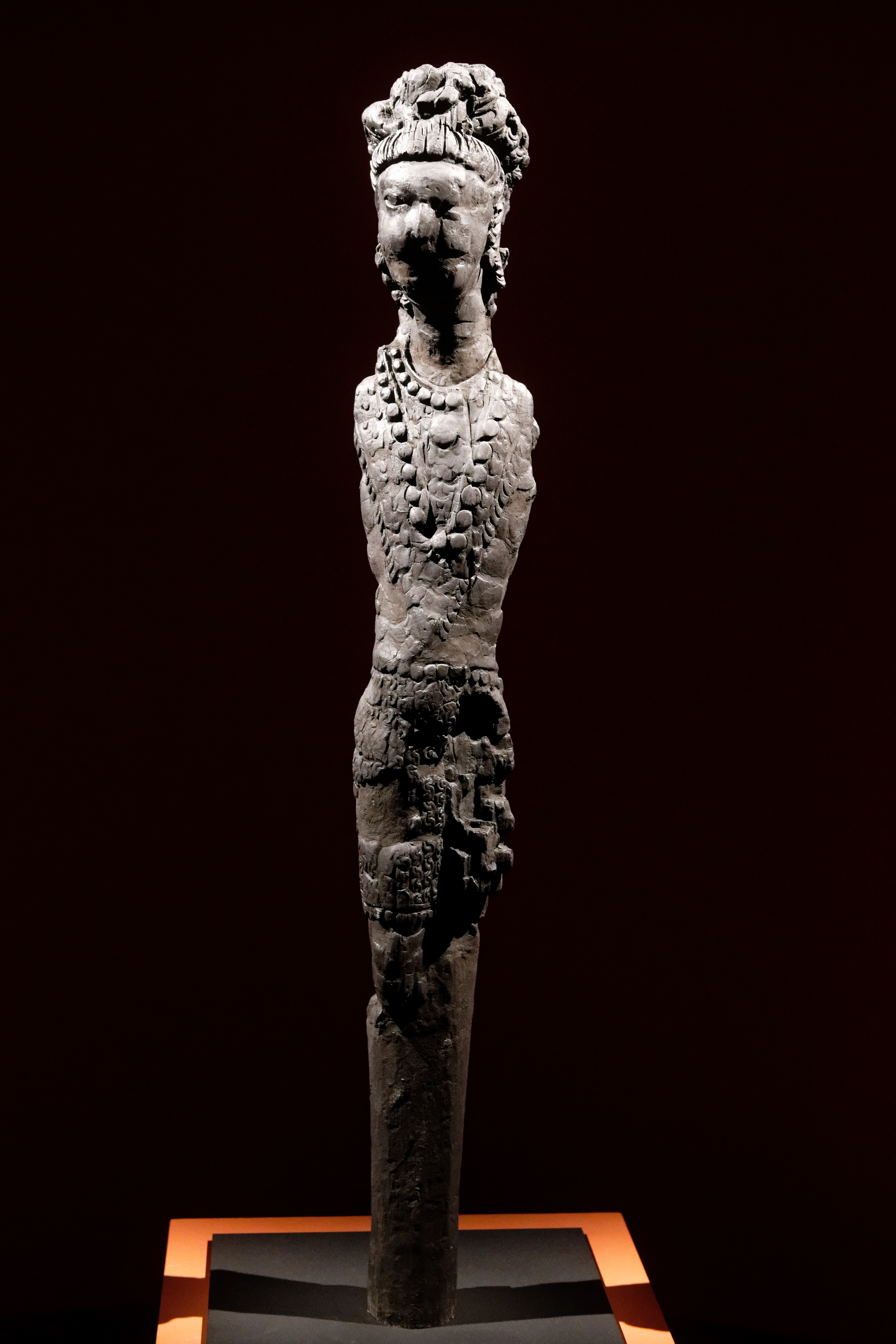
Caryatid, 7th–8th century. From Panjakent, Tajikistan.

The town grew in the 5th century AD and many professionals such as established businessmen and landowners made their livelihoods in Panjakent. In AD 722, Arab Muslims forces besieged and took the town. The last ruler of the town, Divashtich, fled into upper Zarafshan but he was captured and sentenced to death. For around 50 years, ancient Panjakent was ruled by new administrators but towards the end of the 8th century the town on the upper terraces was depopulated and relocated. Many ancient ruins of the old city, particularly the city architecture and works of art remain today.

The Sogdians settled in a number of the city states in the Zeravashan Valley and the surrounding oases clustered mostly around the Samarkand. Those city states had a strong rivalry between them, with their own traditions, rules and ruling families, creating a very decentralized political system. The city of Panjakent was located around 90 km away from Samarkand and was a vassal state to Samarkand.

Numerous records of a Penjikent rulership, written in Sogdian, were located not far of Penjikent on Mount Mug. Through their reading of these texts, the public of Central Asia in the 8th century will judge on social, economic and political life.

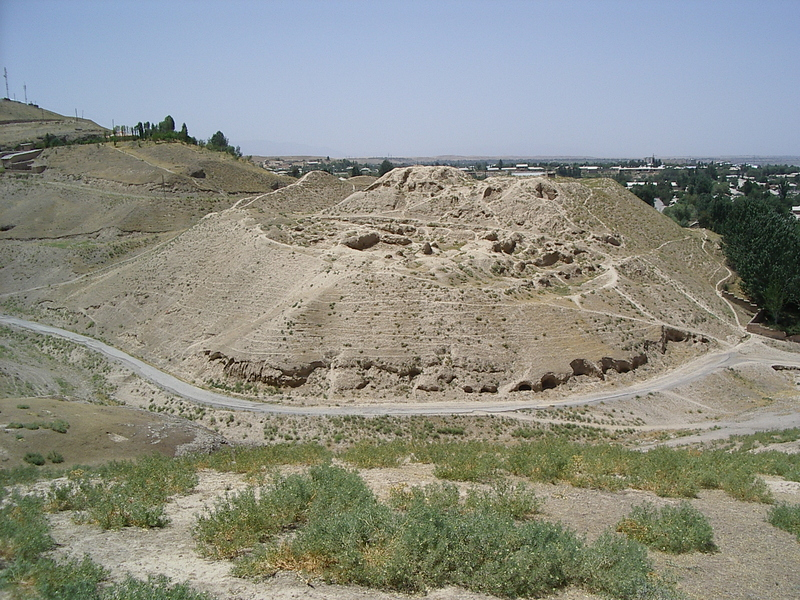
Ruins of ancient Penjikent in Tajikistan.39.488°N 67.616°E

According to Arab geographers, Panjakent in the 10th century had a formal Friday mosque that distinguished the place as a town from a village. It was the easternmost city of Soghd, and became well known for its walnuts.

Russian archaeologist Boris Marshak spent more than fifty years excavating the ruins at Panjakent. He remained there even after Tajik independence as director of the excavation of the Panjakent ruins, during the years of Civil War in Tajikistan from 1992 to 1997. Through close cooperation with the government of Tajikistan, Marshak ensured the protection and continued excavation of the Panjakent ruins.

=== Ancient murals and artifacts ===
Numerous murals were recovered from the site of Panjikent, and many of them are now on display in the Hermitage Museum and in the National Museum of Antiquities of Tajikistan in Dushanbe. A great variety influences are visible in the paintings, which show details of dress and daily life: Greek decorative styles encounter the Iranian narratives of the Shahnameh and the epic cycle of Rostam, scenes of festivities alternate with depictions of combats, local cults mix with Iranian and Hindu deities. Shaivism was popular in Sogdiana and Eastern Turkestan as found from the wall painting from Penjikent on the river Zervashan. In this depiction, Shiva is portrayed with a sacred halo and a sacred thread ("Yajnopavita"). He is clad in a tigerskin while his attendants are wearing Sogdian dress. There is a depiction of him four-legged seated cross-legged on a cushioned seat supported by two bulls.

The production of paintings started in the 5th century AD and stopped in 722 AD with the invasion of the Abbasid Caliphate, and many works of art were damaged or destroyed at that time.

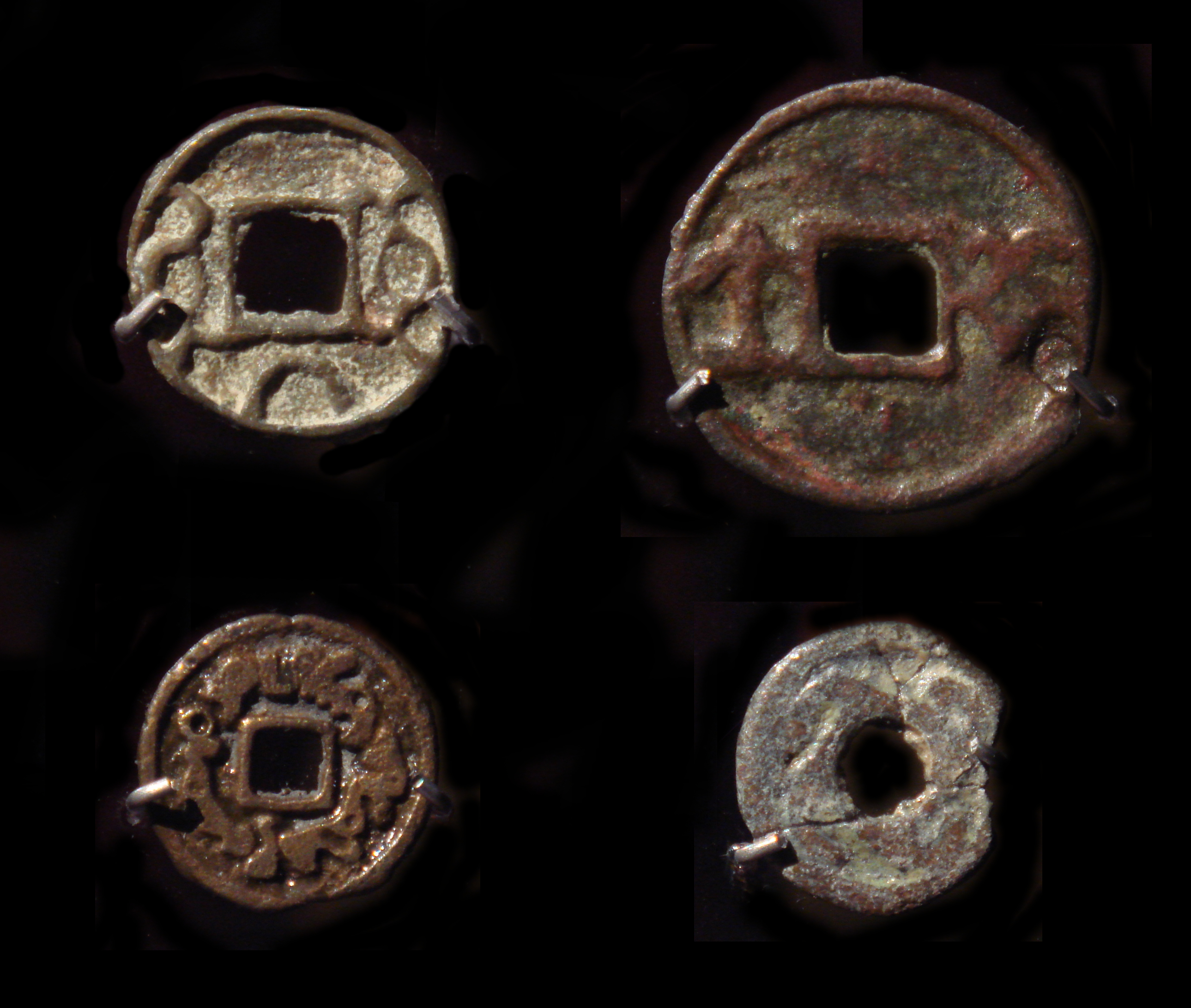
Chinese-style coinage of the rulers of Penjikent, Tajikistan, 7-8th century CE

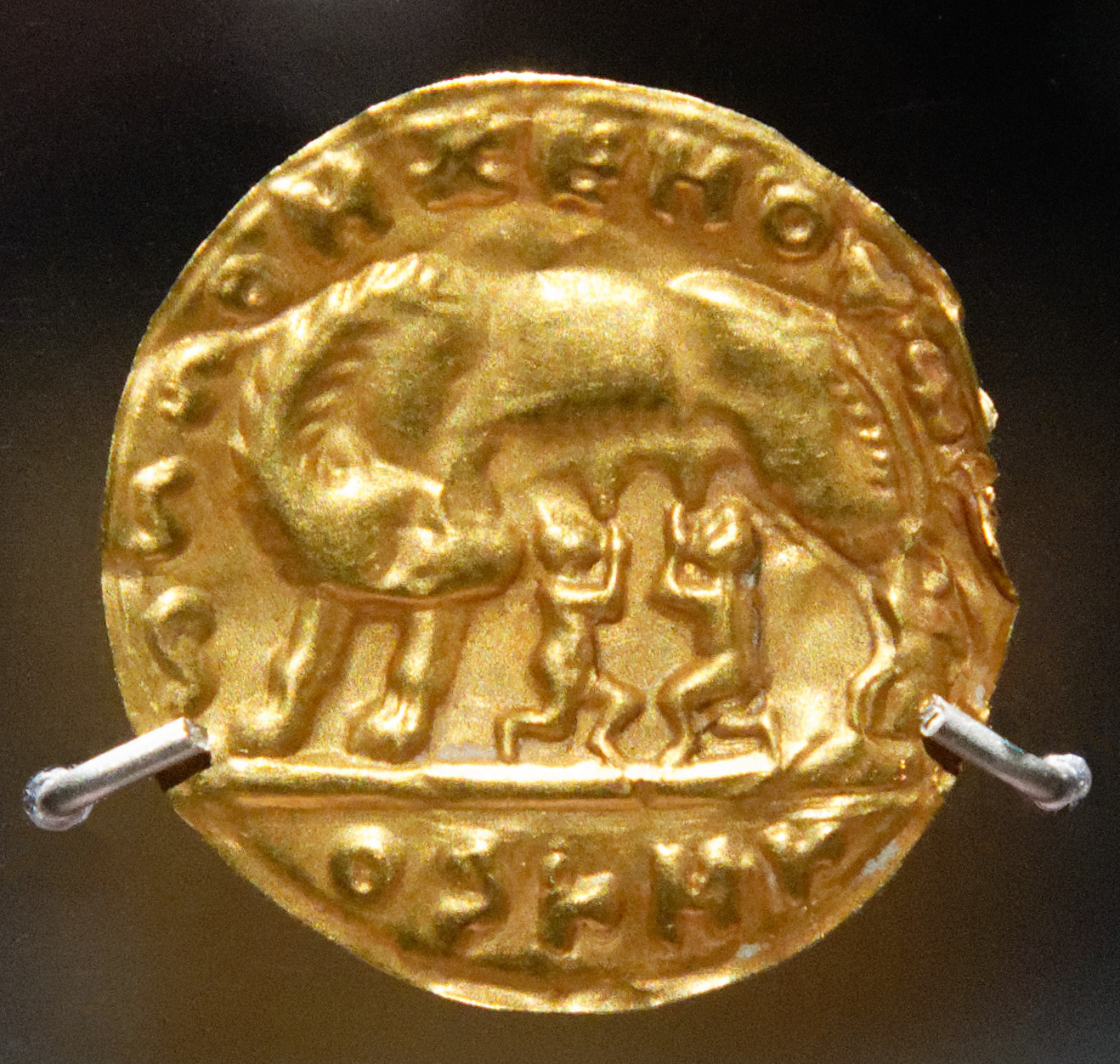
She-wolf suckling two infants ("Romulus and Remus"), Penjikent, 5th century CE, National Museum of Antiquities of Tajikistan (KP 208–243).

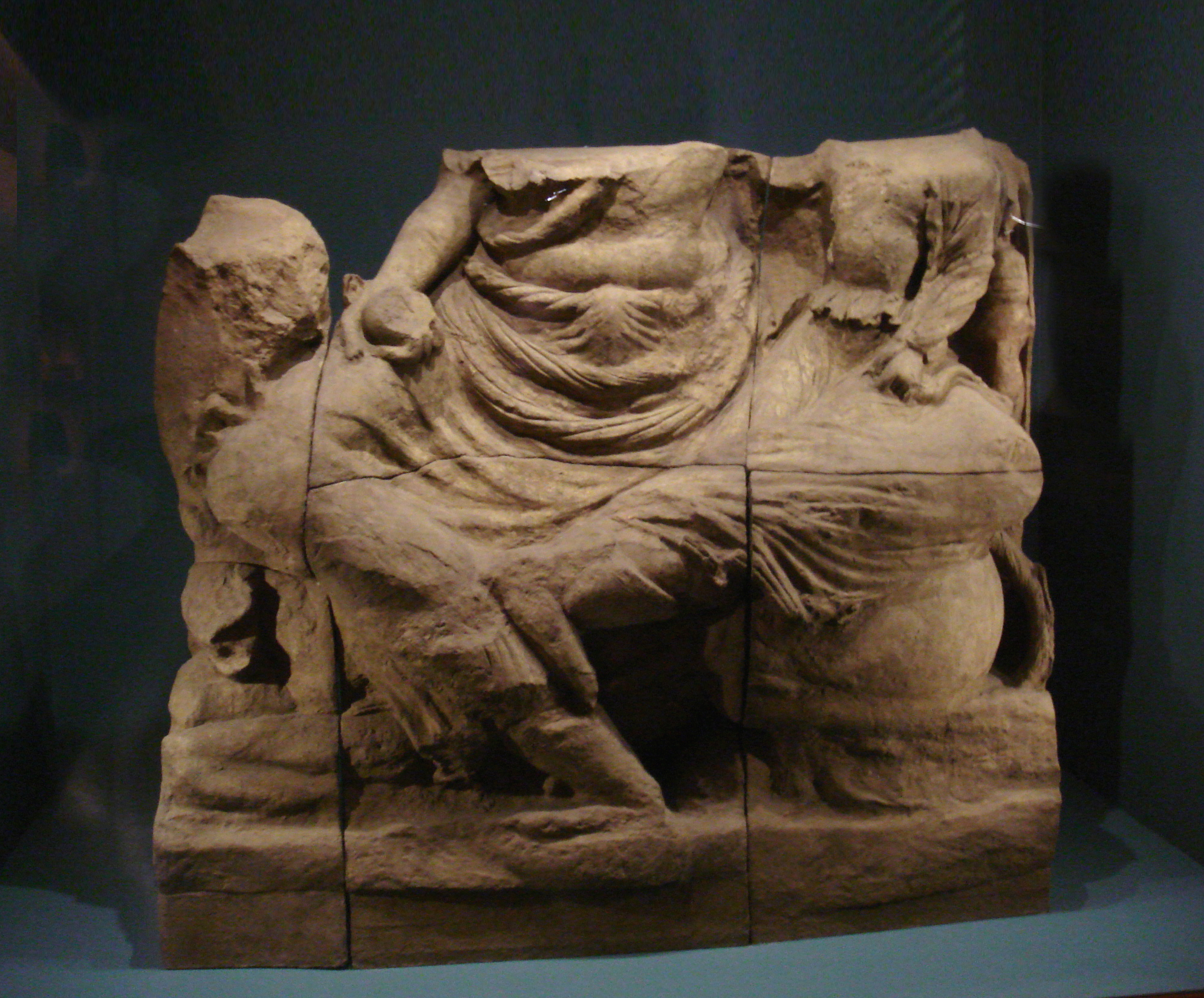
Uma-Maheshvara: ithyphallic Shiva with spouse Uma riding the bull Nandi, Penjikent Temple II, 690-722 CE, National Museum of Antiquities of Tajikistan (60).

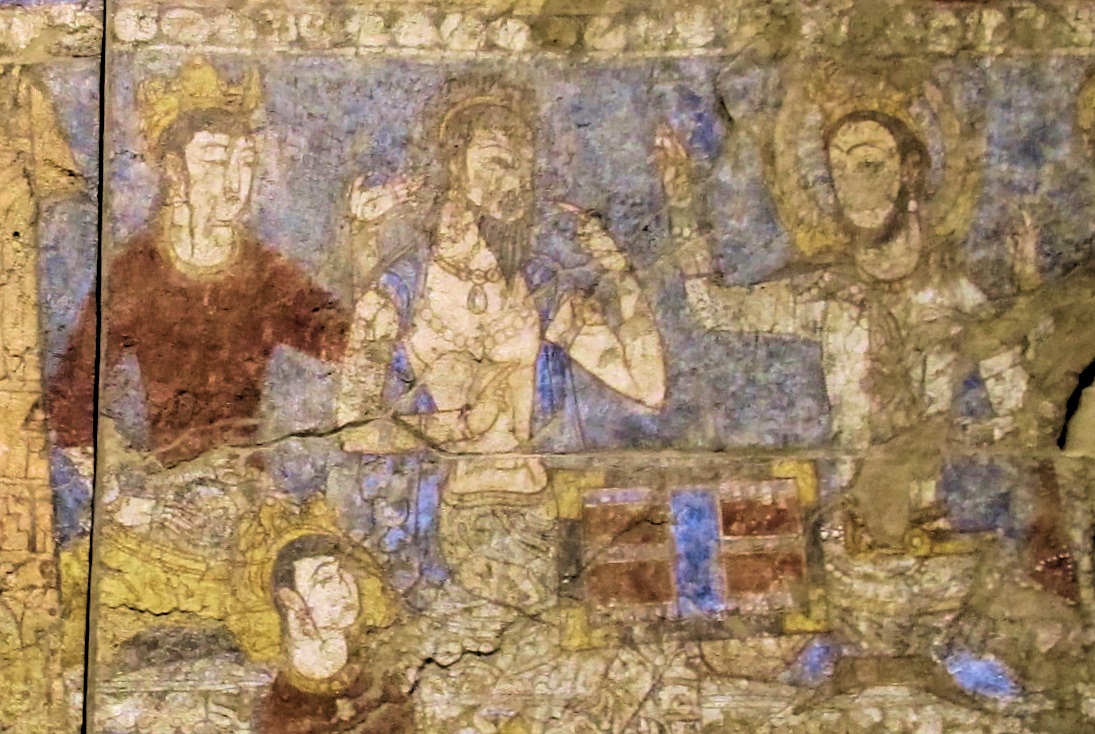
Penjikent, figures with halos, Hermitage Museum

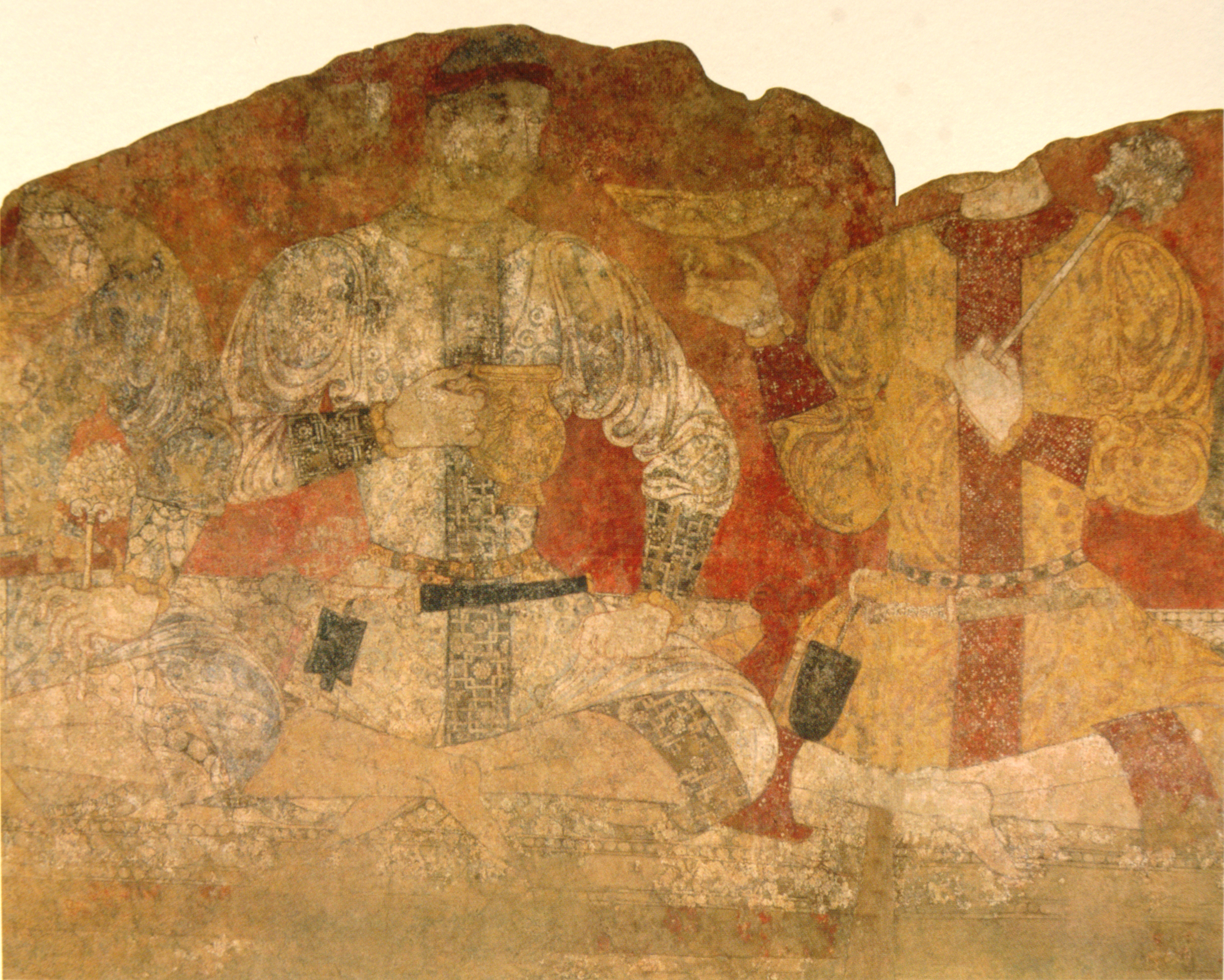
Men banquet, pigment on plaster. Pendjikent, Tajikistan

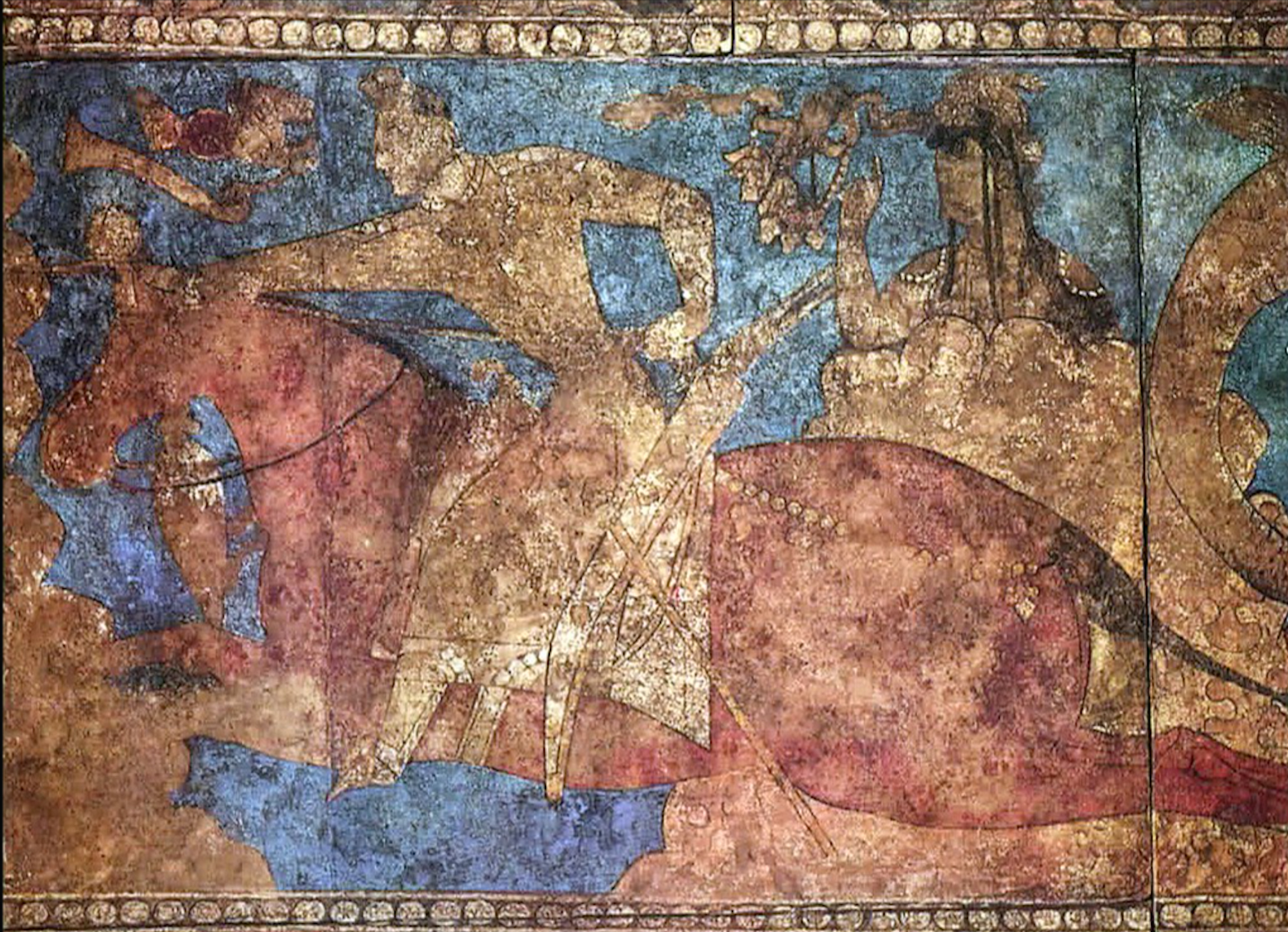
Panjikent mural (6th-7th century AD). Hermitage Museum

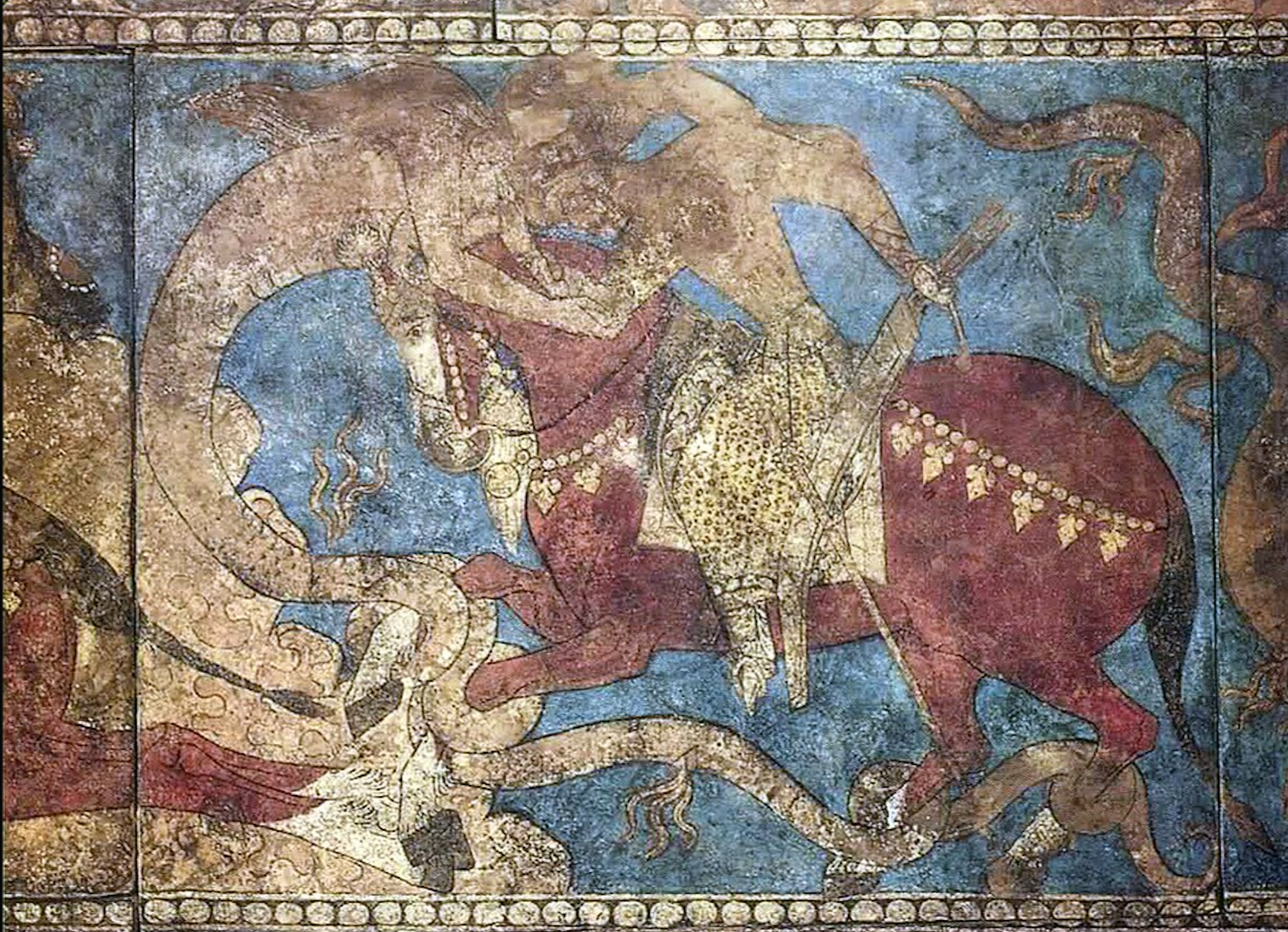
Panjakent (Panjīkant) mural, 6th-8th centuries AD. Hermitage Museum

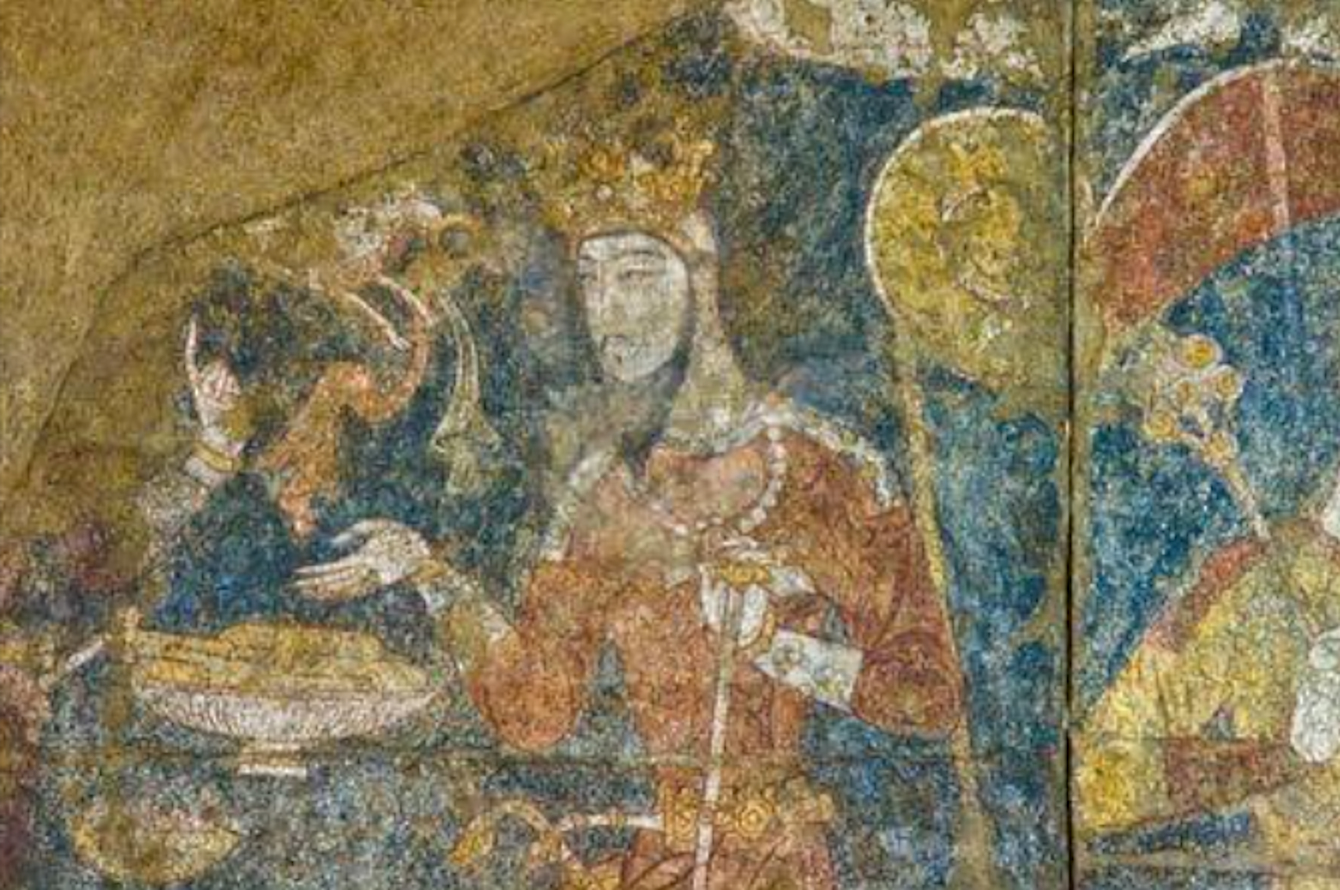
Panjakent (Panjīkant) mural, 6th-8th centuries AD. National Museum of Antiquities of Tajikistan

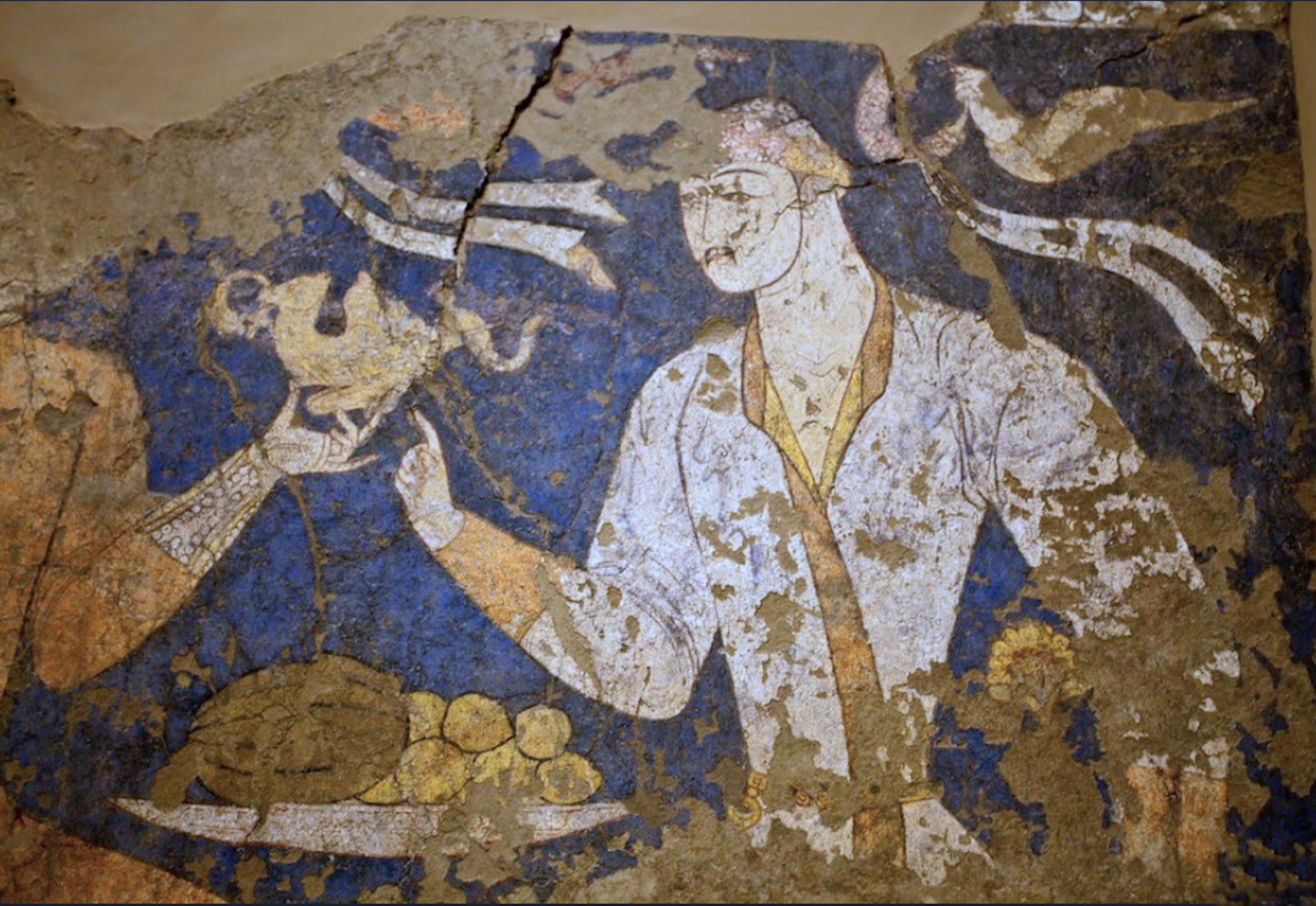
Panjakent (Panjīkant) mural, 6th-8th centuries AD

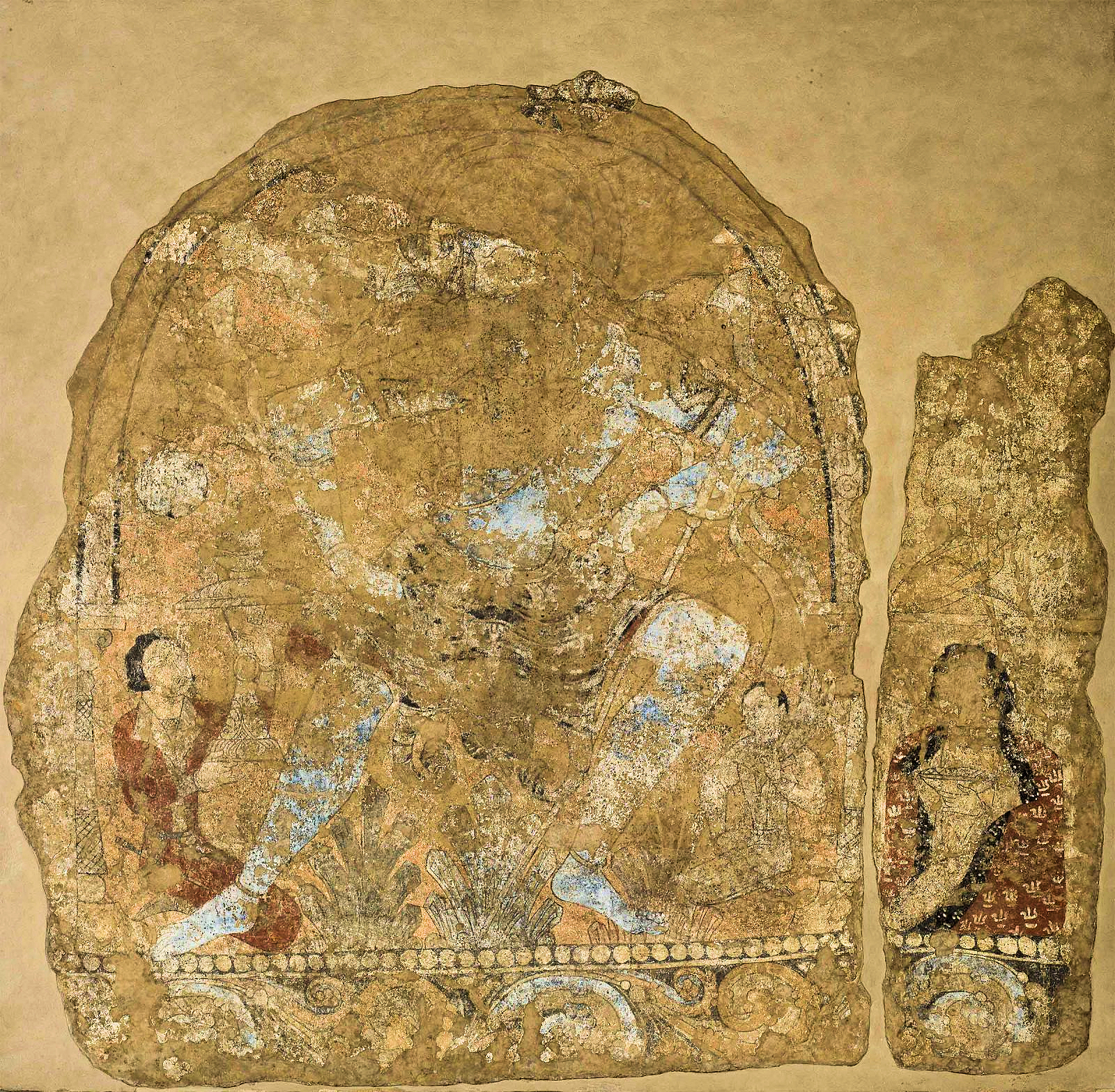
Shiva with Trisula. Penjikent 7th–8th century AD. Hermitage Museum

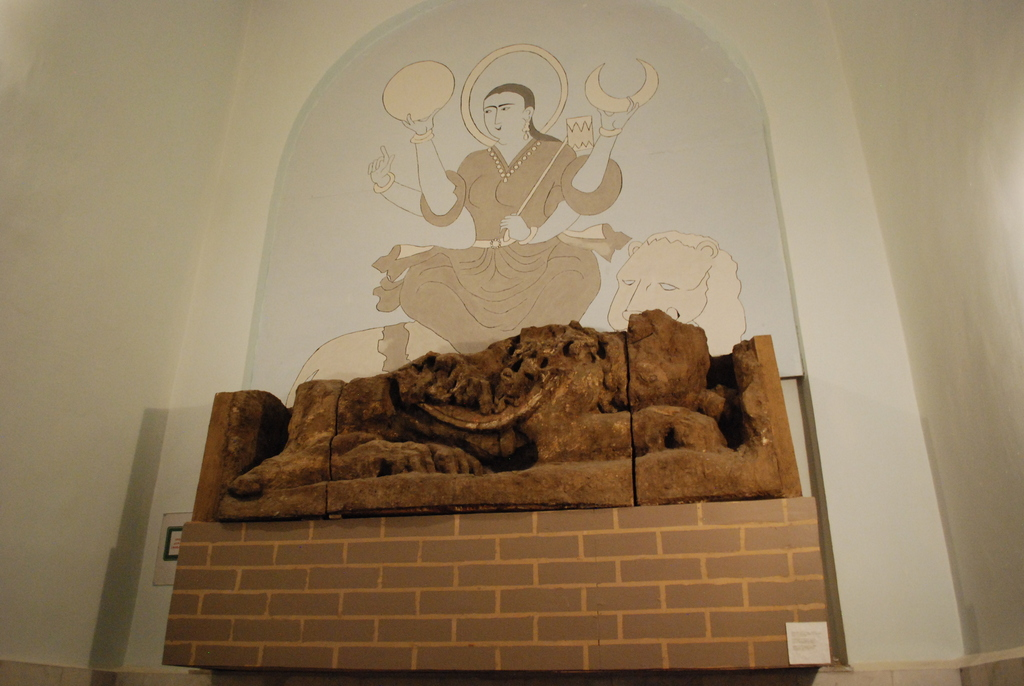
Lion and Goddess Nana, Penjikent, 6th-8th c AD

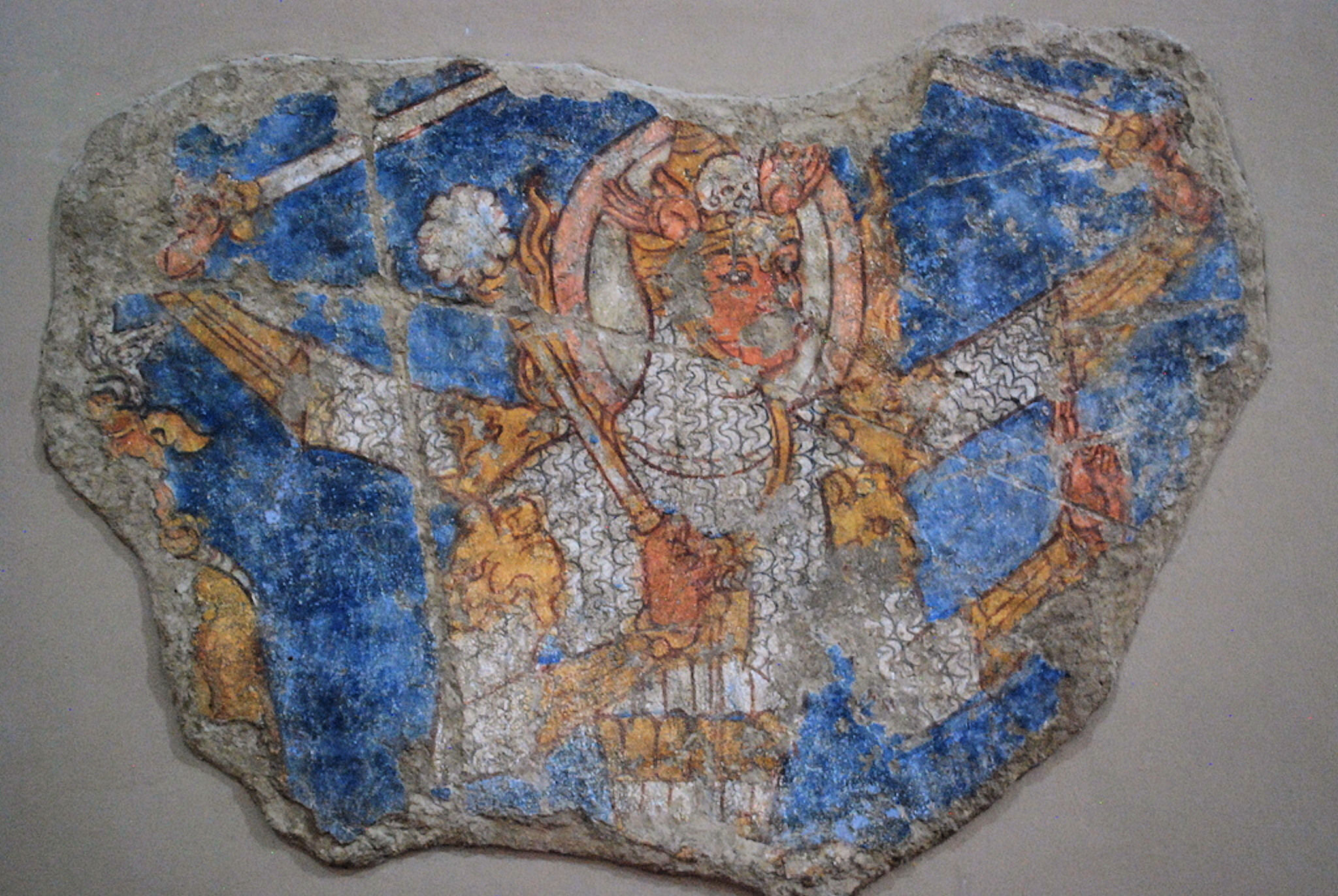
Multi-armed deity in armour

== Geography ==
=== Climate ===
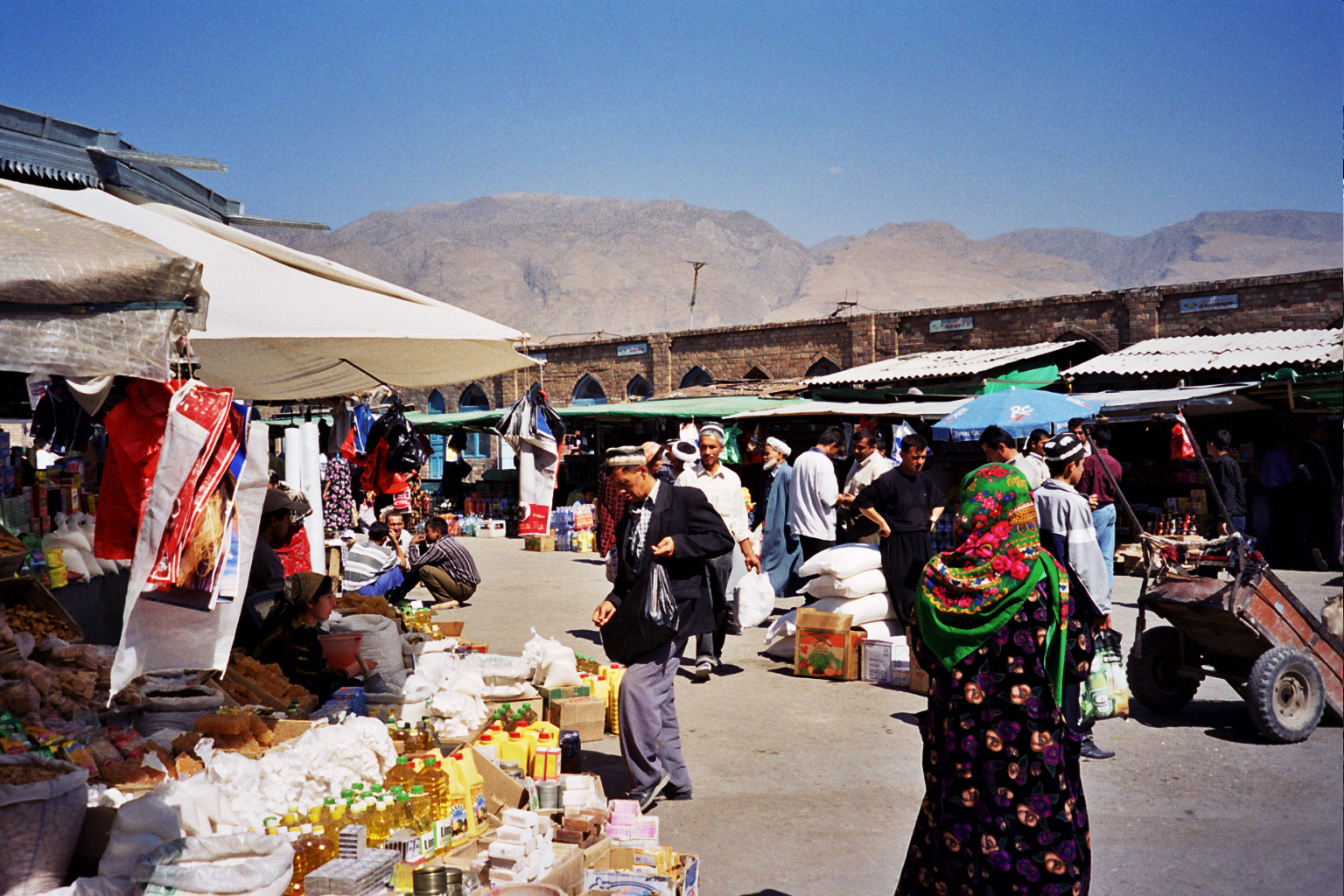
Panjakent bazaar

Panjakent has a hot summer mediterranean climate (Köppen climate classification Csa). The warmest month is July and the coldest month is January. The average annual precipitation is 364.9 mm (14.37 in) and has an average of 108 days with precipitation. The wettest month is April with an average of 73.1 mm (2.88 in) of precipitation and the driest month is August with an average of 2.7 mm (0.11 in) of precipitation.

Climate data for Kulob (1961-1990 normals)
Month	Jan	Feb	Mar	Apr	May	Jun	Jul	Aug	Sep	Oct	Nov	Dec	Year
Mean daily maximum °C (°F)	5.6 (42.1)	7.3 (45.1)	12.5 (54.5)	19.4 (66.9)	24.5 (76.1)	30.6 (87.1)	32.8 (91.0)	31.3 (88.3)	26.7 (80.1)	19.9 (67.8)	14.0 (57.2)	8.7 (47.7)	19.4 (67.0)
Mean daily minimum °C (°F)	−4.8 (23.4)	−3.3 (26.1)	2.0 (35.6)	7.5 (45.5)	11.6 (52.9)	15.6 (60.1)	17.3 (63.1)	15.3 (59.5)	10.9 (51.6)	6.1 (43.0)	1.9 (35.4)	−1.8 (28.8)	6.5 (43.8)
Average precipitation mm (inches)	38.1 (1.50)	36.9 (1.45)	61.6 (2.43)	73.1 (2.88)	44.4 (1.75)	5.5 (0.22)	7.4 (0.29)	2.7 (0.11)	6.6 (0.26)	26.8 (1.06)	25.0 (0.98)	36.8 (1.45)	364.9 (14.38)
Average precipitation days (≥ 0.1 mm)	12	13	15	15	12	5	4	3	3	8	8	10	108
Source: WMO

== Subdivisions ==
Before ca. 2018, Panjakent was the seat of Panjakent District, which covered the rural part of the present city of Panjakent. The city of Panjakent covers Panjakent proper and fourteen jamoats. These are as follows:

Jamoat	Population (Jan. 2015)
Amondara	13,380
Chinor	6,879
Farob	8,650
Khalifa Hassan	14,728
Khurmi	10,451
Kosatarosh	18,986
Loiq Sherali	18,675
Moghiyon	19,553
Rudaki	18,465
Sarazm	27,877
Shing	10,873
Sujina	12,285
Voru	12,347
Yori	19,045

== Notable people ==
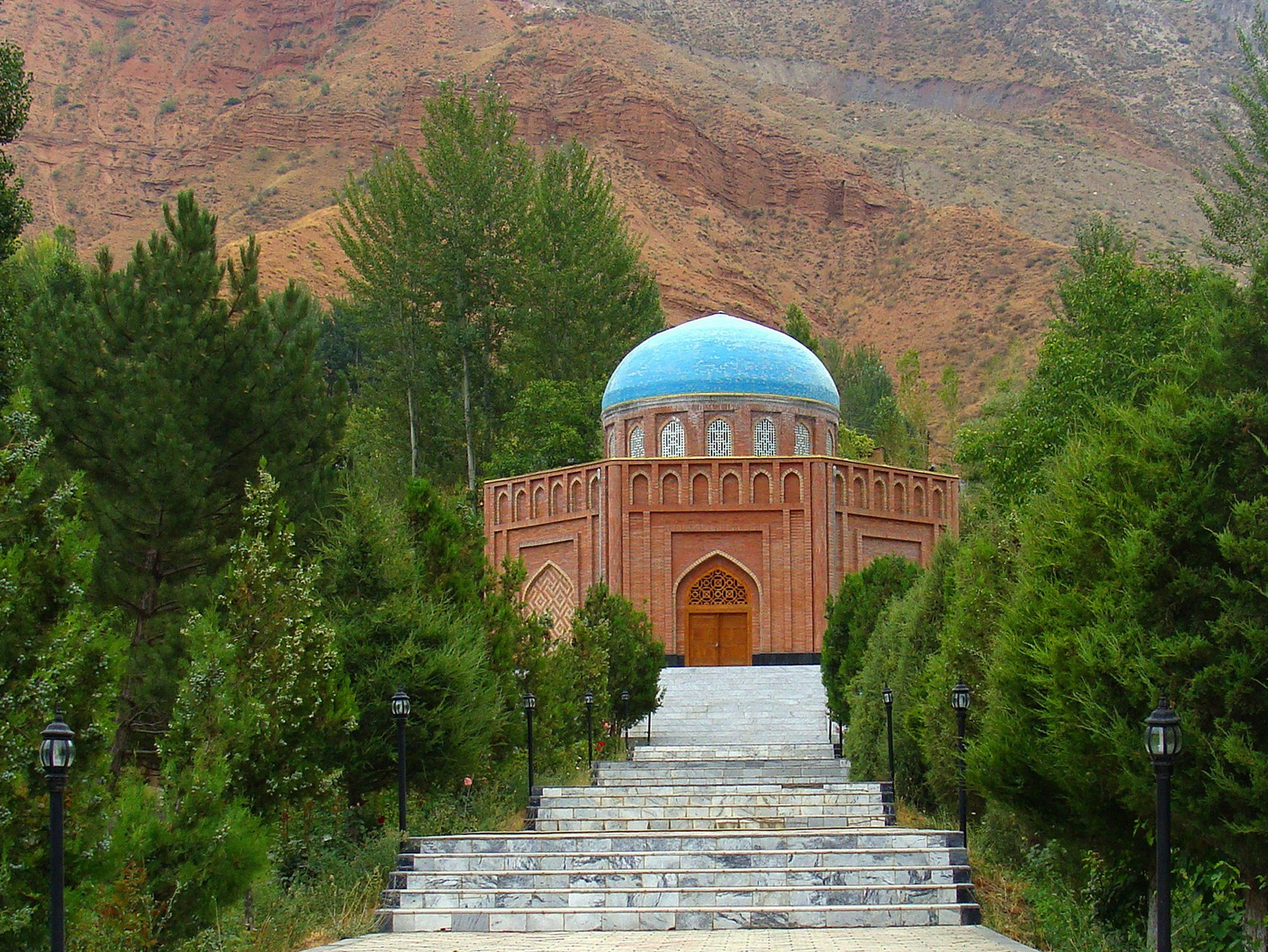
The Rudaki Tomb of Panjakent

- Nigina Amonkulova, folk singer
- Khayrinisso Yusufi, vice-premier of Tajikistan, member of the Assembly of Representatives.
- Otakhon Latifi (Tajik: Отахон Латифи) (1936–1998), was a noted journalist and politician
- Yaqub Beg, leader of Uighur state of Yettishar during the Dungan Revolt against the Qing dynasty in years 1865–1877
- Rustem Umierov (b. 1982), Ukrainian Crimean Tatar politician

== See also ==
- List of cities in Tajikistan
- Rudaki Republican Museum of Regional History, Panjakent
