= Siege of Cyropolis =

329 BCE siege

- Part of the Wars of Alexander the Great
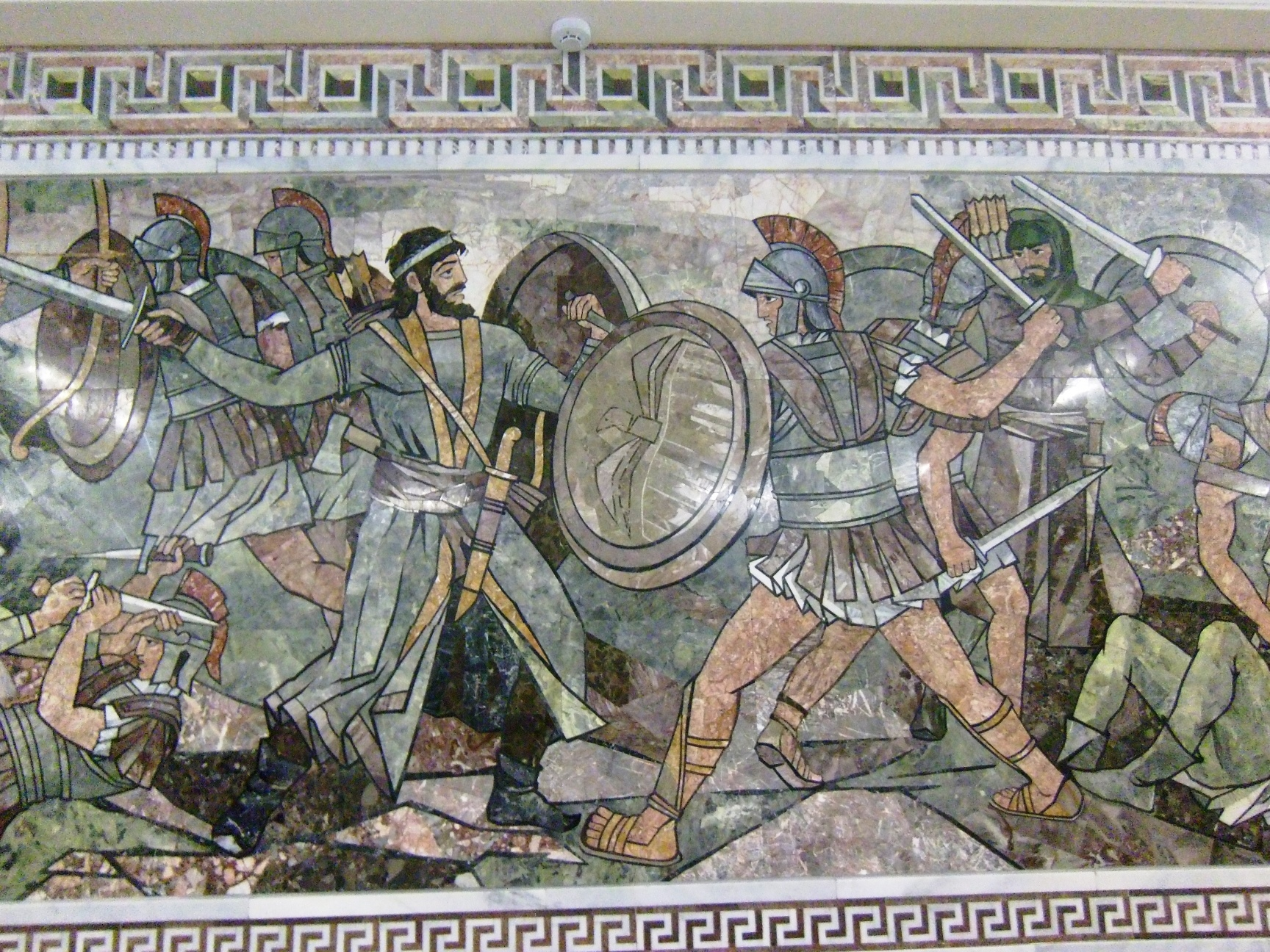
Date	329 BC
Location	Cyropolis, Sogdiana (present-day Tajikistan) 40.283333°N 69.633333°E
Result	Macedonian victory
Territorial changes	Cyropolis captured by Macedon

Belligerents
Macedonia; League of Corinth	Sogdiana

Commanders and leaders
Alexander the Great (WIA); Craterus (WIA)	Unknown

Strength
10,000	15,000

Casualties and losses
Light–Moderate	8,000 killed
- Location of the Siege of Cyropolis

Alexander the Great
current battle

Cyropolis was the largest of seven towns in the region that Alexander the Great targeted for conquest in 329 BC. His goal was the conquest of Sogdiana. Alexander first sent Craterus to Cyropolis, the largest of the Sogdian towns holding out against Alexander's forces. Craterus' instructions were to "take up a position close to the town, surround it with a ditch and stockade, and then assemble such siege engines as might suit his purpose". The idea was to keep the inhabitants focused on their own defences and to prevent them from sending assistance out to the other towns.

Starting from Gazza, Alexander went on to conquer the other surrounding towns. Five of the seven towns were taken in two days. Many of the inhabitants were killed. Alexander then arrived at Cyropolis, which was the best fortified of the towns and had the largest population. It also had reputedly the best fighters of the region. Alexander battered Cyropolis' defences with the siege engines. While the bombardment went on, Alexander ordered certain of his troops to sneak through a dried-up water course that went under the town's wall. Alexander also joined this mission and once inside his troops opened the town's gate to admit his attacking force. Once the natives saw that the town was taken, they fell violently upon the attackers. Alexander received a violent blow from a stone that landed upon his head and neck. Craterus was wounded by an arrow, but the defenders were driven off. Arrian puts the defender's force at about 15,000 fighting men and claims that 8,000 of them were killed in the first phase of the operation. The rest apparently sought refuge inside the town's central fortress, but surrendered after one day for lack of water.

Accounts of how the battle went differ among authors. Arrian cites Ptolemy as saying Cyropolis surrendered, and Arrian also states that according to Aristobulus the place was stormed and the town's inhabitants were massacred. Arrian also cites Ptolemy saying that he distributed the men among the army and ordered that they should be kept guarded in chains until he should depart from the country, so that none of those who had affected the revolt should be left behind.
