= Alexandria Eschate =

Ancient Macedonian city in modern Tajikistan

- Ἀλεξάνδρεια Ἐσχάτη (Ancient Greek)
- Alexandria the Farthest
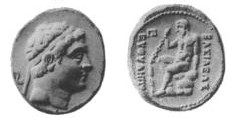
- Coin depicting the Greco-Bactrian king Euthydemus (230–200 BC)

- Location of Alexandria Eschate Alexandria Eschate (Tajikistan)
- 40°17′10″N 69°37′02″E
- Type: Settlement
- Location: Tajikistan
- Region: Sughd Region

History
- Built: August 329 BC
- Built by: Alexander the Great

Alexandria Eschate (Attic Greek: Ἀλεξάνδρεια Ἐσχάτη, Doric Greek: Ἀλεξάνδρεια Ἐσχάτα, romanized: Alexandria Eschata, "Furthest Alexandria") was a city founded by Alexander the Great, at the south-western end of the Fergana Valley (modern Tajikistan) in August 329 BC. It was the most northerly outpost of Alexander's Empire in Central Asia. Alexandria Eschate was established on the south bank of the river Jaxartes (Syr Darya), at or close to the site of modern Khujand (Хуҷанд; خجند), in present-day Tajikistan. According to the Roman writer Curtius, Alexandria Ultima retained its Greek culture as late as 30 BC.

== History ==
=== Achaemenid Empire ===
Cyrus the Great founded a city there as his northeastern-most outpost, known as Cyropolis. This region, where Alexandria Eschate would be founded, was ruled over by Persia starting with Xerxes I as part of his transcontinental empire. When Greeks in other parts of the Persian empire rebelled or otherwise were troublesome, they would be exiled to the far northeast of the Persian empire, the most distant segment from their homelands. This was not uncommon, because the coastline of Asia Minor participating in the Ionian Revolt was populated by Greek polis. By the time of the fall of Persia to Alexander the Great, remnants of the Greek language and culture were still present in that area. The original Cyropolis, which may have later become the site of Alexandria Eschate, was simply renamed and re-established as a key city.

=== Alexander the Great ===
Alexander, during his years of conquest, would regularly establish long-term outposts to support his advance, either renaming and permanently securing an existing city or creating a long-term, albeit non-permanent, outpost built up like a town. According to the Greek author Plutarch, Alexander named seventy of these bases after himself, though this may be an exaggeration; only a couple of dozen are known today.

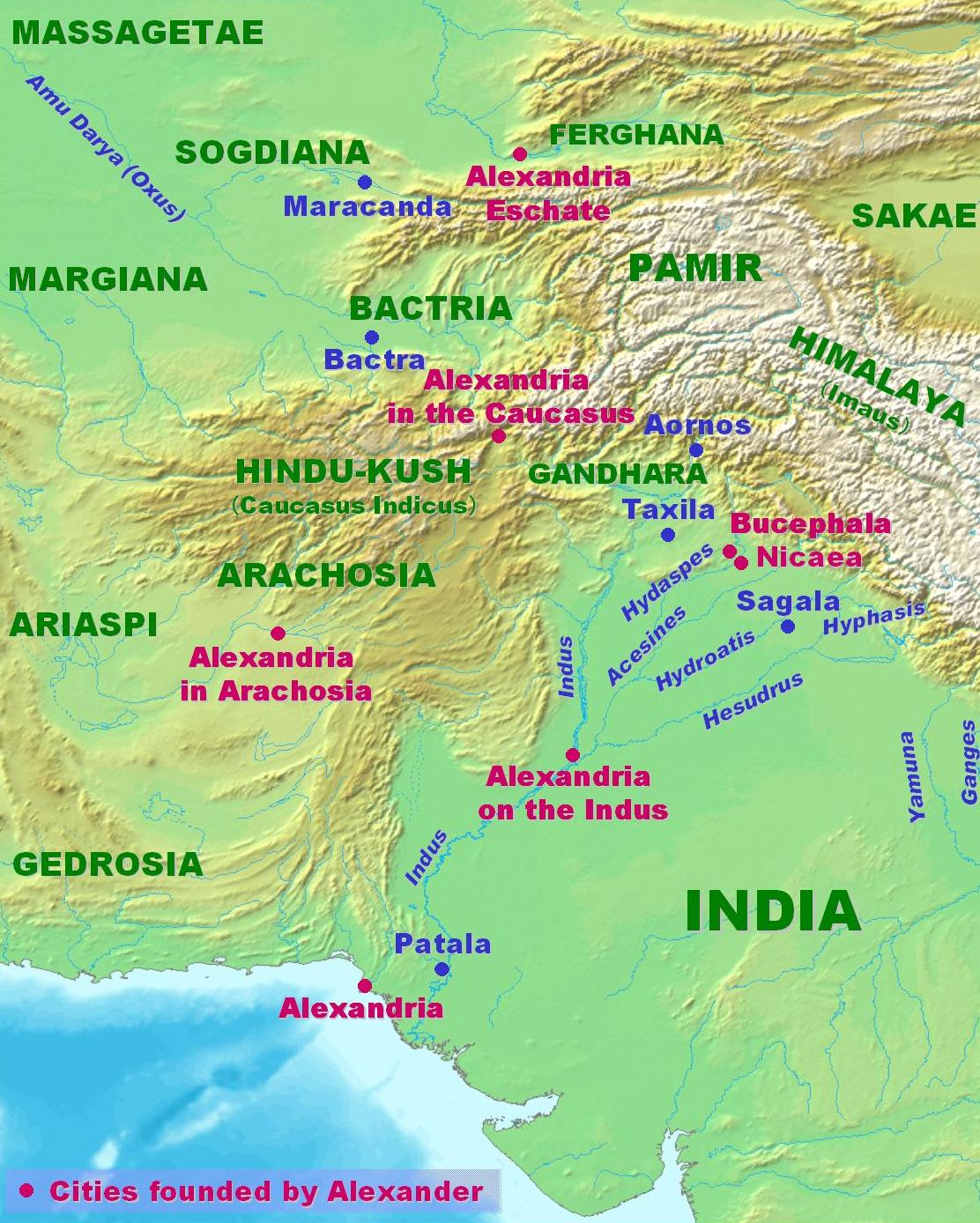
Alexandria Eschate was located in the Ferghana Valley. (top, center).

In order to secure Sogdiana, the northeastern corner of the Persian empire, Alexander targeted Cyropolis and a half dozen other cities in 329 BC.

Alexander first sent Craterus to Cyropolis, the largest of the towns holding Sogdiana against Alexander's forces. Craterus' instructions were to "take up a position close to the town, surround it with a ditch and stockade, and then assemble such siege engines as might suit his purpose...." The idea was to keep the inhabitants focused on their own defenses and to prevent them from sending assistance out to the other towns. Starting from Gazza, Alexander went on to conquer the other surrounding towns. Five of the seven towns were taken in two days. Many of the inhabitants were killed. Alexander then arrived at Cyropolis, which was the best fortified of the towns and had the largest population. It also had reputedly the best fighters of the region. Alexander battered Cyropolis' defenses with the siege engines. While the bombardment went on, Alexander ordered certain of his troops to sneak through a dried-up water course that went under the town's wall. Alexander also joined this mission, and once inside, his troops opened the town's gate to admit his attacking force. Once the natives saw that the town was taken, they fell violently upon the attackers. Alexander received a violent blow from a stone that landed upon his head and neck. Craterus was wounded by an arrow. But the defenders were driven off. Arrian puts the defender's force at about 15,000 fighting men and claims that 8,000 of them were killed in the first phase of the operation. The rest apparently sought refuge inside the town's central fortress, but surrendered after one day for lack of water.

Accounts of how the battle went down differ among authors. Arrian cites Ptolemy as saying Cyropolis surrendered from the start, and Arrian also states that according to Aristobulus the place was stormed and everyone was massacred.

One, probably Cyropolis, came to be called Alexandria Eschate, its northeastern-most outpost. As with most other cities founded by Alexander, a group of retired and/or wounded veterans from his army was settled there, joining the large population of Greek exiles settled in the area by Persia in previous generations.

=== Hellenistic period ===
Because Alexandria Eschate was surrounded by Sogdian tribes, and was about 300 km (186 mi) north of the nearest Greek settlement, at Alexandria on the Oxus in Bactria, the Greeks built a 6.0 km (3.7 mi) wall around the city which, according to the ancient authors, was completed in about 20 days. It experienced numerous conflicts with the local population.

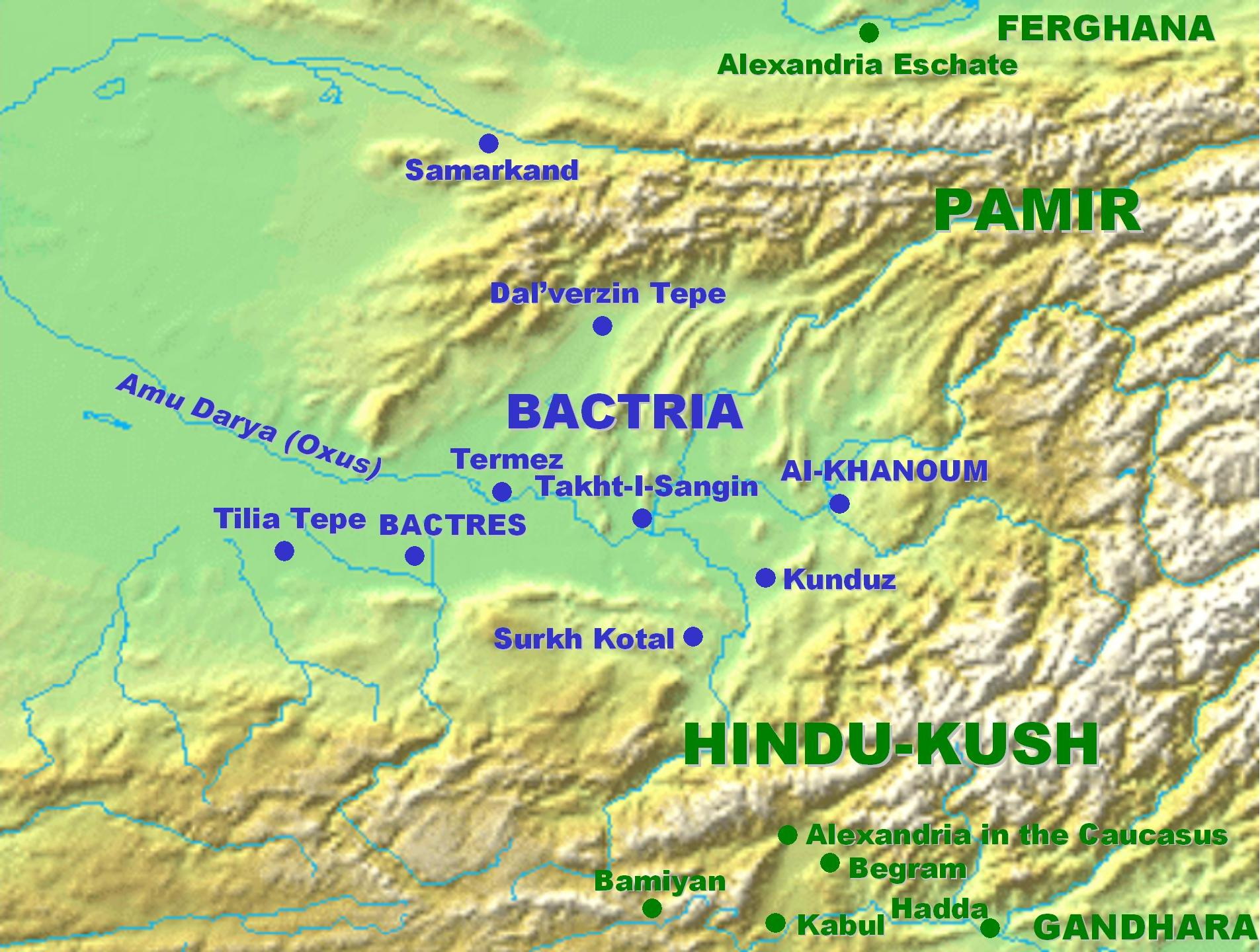
Alexandria Eschate was located 300 km north-west of the main Greek colonies in Central Asia, at Bactria.

From 250 BC, the city likely had greater contact with Bactria, after the Greco-Bactrian king Euthydemus I extended his control into Sogdiana.

Alexandria Eschate was also located around 400 km (249 mi) west of the Tarim Basin (now Xinjiang, China), where other Indo-European peoples, like the Khotanese, Tocharians, Wusun and/or Yuezhi were established. There are indications that Greek expeditions travelled as far as Kashgar. The historian Strabo claims that the Greeks "extended their empire even as far as the Seres and the Phryni.

"Seres" meant either China proper – in which case the Greeks achieved the first direct contact between China and a European society, sometime around 200 BC – or the peoples of the Tarim. In any case, the capital of a state known to the Chinese as Dayuan, which was mentioned by scholars from the Han dynasty (1st century BC to 2nd century AD), is speculated to refer to Alexandria Eschate. The prefix da meant "Great", while Yuan was the Chinese rendition of Ionians. Dayuan means "Great Ionians" in the Chinese language, since Greeks generally being known in Asia by some variant of "Ionians". See Names of the Greeks: Ionians, Yunani, and Yavan for more information.

=== Han Invasion ===
Chinese embassies were established in Dayuan, beginning with Zhang Qian around 130 BC. Soon, the city and the rest of Dayuan were conquered completely by the Han dynasty after winning the War of the Heavenly Horses. This contributed to the opening up of the Silk Road from the 1st century BC.

Following the conquests of the Scythians and Kushan Empire and Parthians, Greek language and culture were replaced by subsequent empires.

== Archaeological remains ==
The remains of Alexander's town lie in the tell of the old citadel in Khojand. Although the oldest surface remains of the walls date only to the 10th century, Soviet and Tajik excavations of the site have revealed that below the modern surface are medieval, Hellenistic and Achaemenid layers. These layers have revealed fortifications dating to around the 4th century BC.

Other remains include household utensils, armaments, and building materials, which are exhibited in the Museum of Regional Studies in Khojand. The site has also revealed numerous Hellenistic coins and pottery.

In the Tabula Peutingeriana, below the city there is a rhetorical question in Latin: "Hic Alexander responsum accepit: usque quo Alexander?" (English: Here Alexander accepted the answer: "Until where, Alexander?") — referencing both his insatiable appetite for conquest and a legend from the Alexander Romance in which "celestial creatures" admonished Alexander not to pursue further explorations, which would ultimately lead to his untimely death.

== In fiction ==
Alexandria Eschate is the final destination of Euxenus, son of Eutychides of the deme of Pallene, the protagonist of Alexander at the World's End by Tom Holt.

Horses of Heaven, by Gillian Bradshaw, is set in Alexandria Eschate, c. 140 BCE.

== See also ==
- Cyropolis
- List of cities founded by Alexander the Great
