= Historical Museum of Sughd =

Museum in Tajikistan

Coordinates: 40.2852°N 69.6182°E

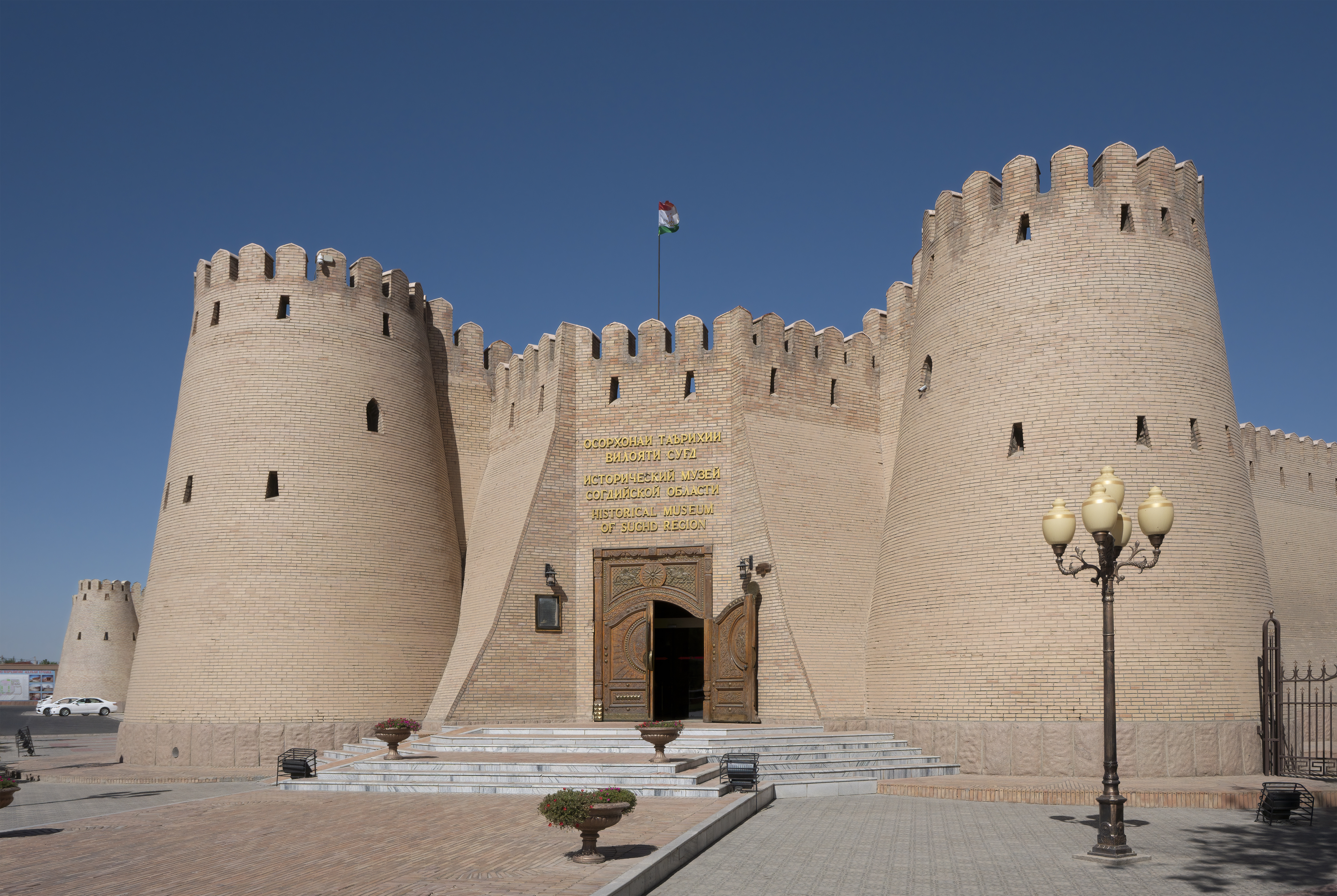
Historical Museum of Sughd

The Historical Museum of Sughd (Tajik: Осорхонаи таърихии вилояти Суғд) is a regional history museum in Khujand, the second-largest city in Tajikistan and the capital of the country's northernmost province, Sughd. The museum has been built within the Khujand Fortress, overlooking the Syr Darya (known in antiquity as the Jaxartes) reconstructed in 1999 on the southeastern corner of the old city wall. The museum was founded in 1986.

One of the exhibition halls in the new Historical Museum of Sughd inaugurated in 2024 in Khujand Fortress

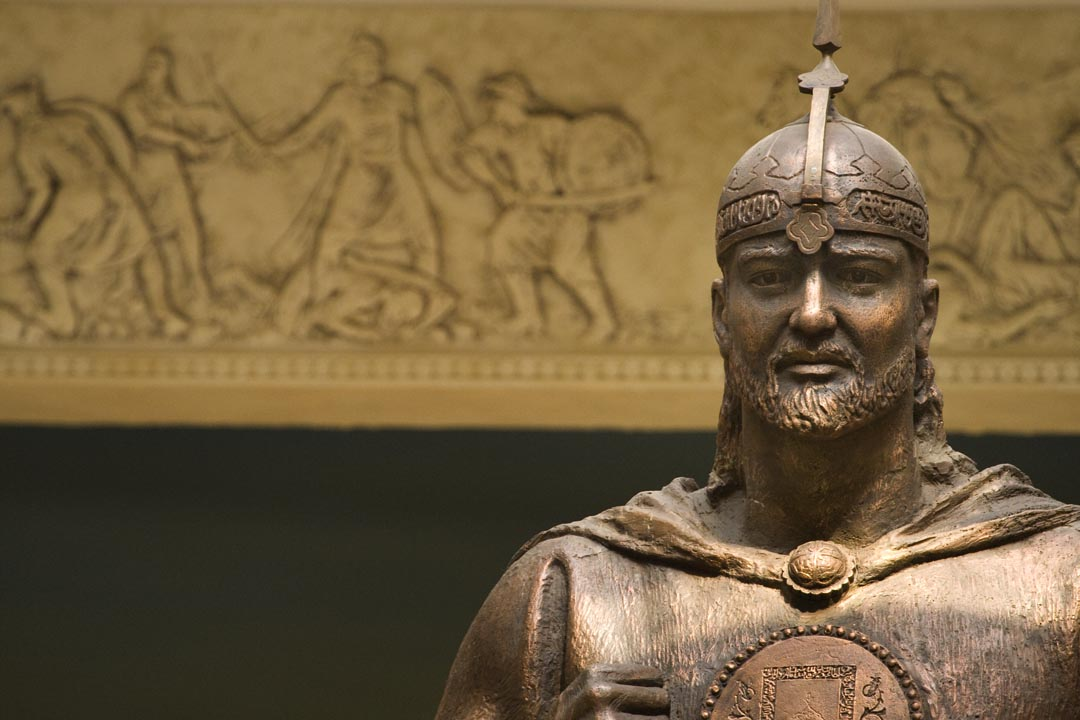
Statue of Timur Malik

== Building ==
The Historical Museum of Sughd is located in the former Khujand Fortress building. The fortress was originally constructed in the 7th century, before being destroyed in the 12th century. It was rebuilt in the late 20th century.

The new, much larger museum building within the Khujand Fortress complex opened on 11 April 2024, formally inaugurated by Tajik President Emomali Rahmon. Starting from 23 April 2024, the new part of the "Khujand Fortress" cultural-historical complex opened for visitors. The new, seven-domed Museum of History includes majestic exhibition halls building covering more than 3,365 square meters, made up of one main dome, two medium domes, and four small domes. It's part of a much larger reconstructed complex.

== Collections ==
The museum was opened on 29 November 1986, as part of the events celebrating the 2500th anniversary of the city, believed to have been founded as Cyropolis. It is among the 10 largest museums in Tajikistan. There are over 15,000 items in the museum's collections, and it features a wide range of artifacts and displays related to the history of the Sughd Region from prehistoric times to the present day. Items on display include rare Tajiki handwoven rugs, Tajiki embroidery, pottery, household items and costumes. Looking further back in time are dioramas of prehistoric life, modern marble mosaics depicting the life of Alexander of Macedon, who built the most distant of his cities nearby and is believed to have captured the city in 329BC, and a statue of Timur Malik, famous for resisting the Mongol invasion in 1219 and 1220. There is also a section of the exhibition related to the history of the fortress, which has been destroyed and rebuilt multiple times over the years.
