= Khujand prison riot =

1997 prison riot in Khujand, Tajikistan

- Location: Khujand, Tajikistan
- Date: 14 April 1997
- Deaths: 24—158
- Injuries: 35—200+
- Perpetrators: Police of Tajikistan; Tajikistan security forces, including Spetsnaz

The Khujand prison riot began on 14 April 1997 when prisoners at Khujand Men's Correctional Labor Colony 3/19 in Khujand, Tajikistan began to protest living conditions and perceived injustice in the prison system. Security forces put down the protest on 17 April in what Human Rights Watch has called a "massacre." The Tajik government says 24 prisoners were killed and 35 were wounded, but human rights organizations and former Prime Minister Abdumalik Abdullajanov have estimated as many as 150 people were killed.

== Ashurov protests ==
In May 1996 assassins killed Akhmajon Ashurov, a popular Khujandi businessman. Ashurov owned several cafés and tea houses and paid for free meals in schools and for senior citizens. Many believed members of the Kulyabi clan had killed Ashurov, prompting demonstrations throughout the Khujand region; at least 20,000 in Khujand and hundreds in Istaravshan, Kanibadam, Isfara, and Shakhristan, demanding the arrest of those who killed Ashurov, up-to-date information as the case progressed, and the firing of Kulyabi officials in the regional government. Protestors later asked for the press to report on the demonstrations on television, control of humanitarian aid, and the designation of Khujand as a free economic zone. The protests went on for ten days with people in Khujand camping out at night. People held signs saying "Down with Emomali Rakhmonov!" and "Uninvited guests go away!" Police arrested Ikrom Ashurov, Akhmajon's brother, on charges of "banditry" and extortion after he participated in the protests.

Local and national government officials negotiated in the city government building surrounded by police officers, members of the Interior Ministry, and the Presidential Guard.

== Conditions ==
Prisoners initially demanded medical care and trials for those awaiting sentencing. They complained about unfair sentencing and wanted improved living conditions. At the time of the riot there were between 800 and 1,000 prisoners in the prison; twice the maximum number of prisoners allowed. In June 1996 the International Committee of the Red Cross began distributing food in an emergency program after starvation, malnutrition, and a lack of medical care led to the deaths of many prisoners. The ICRC and the government both said the prison's conditions were no worse than any other prison in Tajikistan.

The Chairman of the Leninabad Regional Executive said that for stealing two bags of flour someone is sentenced to eight years imprisonment, whereas drug traffickers are sentenced to two years imprisonment. One prisoner, a seventeen-year-old who later died during the riot, had stolen a book from Isfara city library. The court sentenced him to seven years in prison.

A local journalist said the government tried to limit access to information about the riot.
