= Sheikh Muslihiddin Mosque and Mausoleum =

Memorial complex in Khujand, Tajikistan

Coordinates: 40.2794°N 69.6308°E

- Масҷиди Шайх Муслиҳиддин
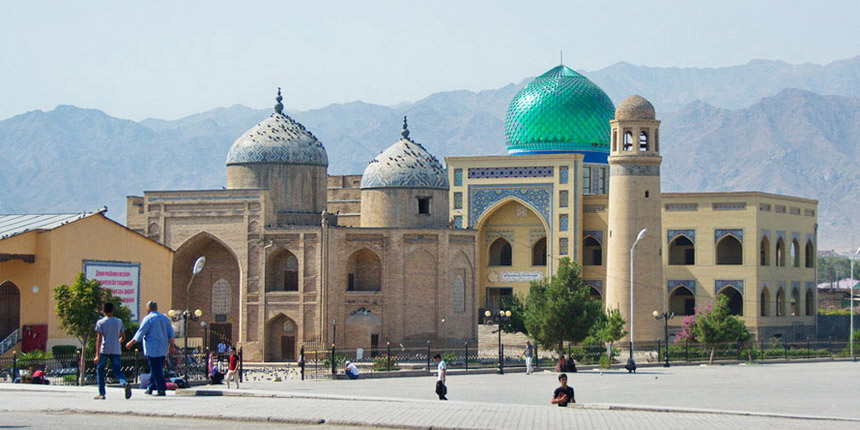
- The main building

Religion
- Affiliation: Islam

Location
- Location: Khujand, Tajikistan
- Interactive map of Sheikh Muslihiddin Mosque and Mausoleum

Architecture
- Completed: made in 12th rebuilt in 14th and rebuilt in 16th

Sheikh Muslihiddin Mosque and Mausoleum (Tajik: Масҷиди Шайх Муслиҳиддин) is a grand memorial complex located in the city of Khujand, Tajikistan, built on the resting place for Muslihiddin Khudjandi a ruler of the city. The original building was built in the 12th century but this structure was destroyed by the Mongols. In the 14th century the structure was rebuilt but the current structure was built in the 16th century.

== History ==
The mausoleum is built on the burial site of Muslihiddin Khudjandi (Tajik: Муслиҳиддин Хуҷандӣ; 1130–1222), a prominent 12th-century figure who was not only the ruler of Khujand but also a poet, philosopher, Sufi teacher, and respected Islamic theologian. According to his preserved biography (manāqib) and local tradition, Sheikh Muslihiddin was regarded as a holy man and miracle-worker. Although Islam does not formally recognize patron saints, for centuries the people of Khujand have venerated him as a spiritual protector of the city.

After his death, Muslihiddin was initially buried in Undzhi (Unji), a settlement on the outskirts of Khujand. Later, his followers transferred his remains into the city and erected a modest mausoleum over his grave in the 12th century. This early structure was a small burial chamber made of baked brick and decorated with terracotta ornamentation, reflecting the simplicity the sheikh favored during his lifetime.

The original mausoleum was destroyed during the Mongol invasions of the 13th century, a catastrophe that devastated much of Transoxiana (Māwarāʾ al-Nahr). In the 14th century, the mausoleum was rebuilt with a new design consisting of two rooms, but this structure too was eventually destroyed for unknown reasons.

A decisive reconstruction occurred in the 16th century, when a new building was erected on the remains of the earlier mausoleums. This version differed significantly from previous ones: it was no longer merely a tomb but a mausoleum-khānaqāh, a place used for prayer, ritual ceremonies, and Sufi gatherings. Over time, repeated repairs and reconstructions altered its original 16th-century appearance. In the second half of the 20th century, the building even served for a period as the regional historical museum.

== Architecture ==
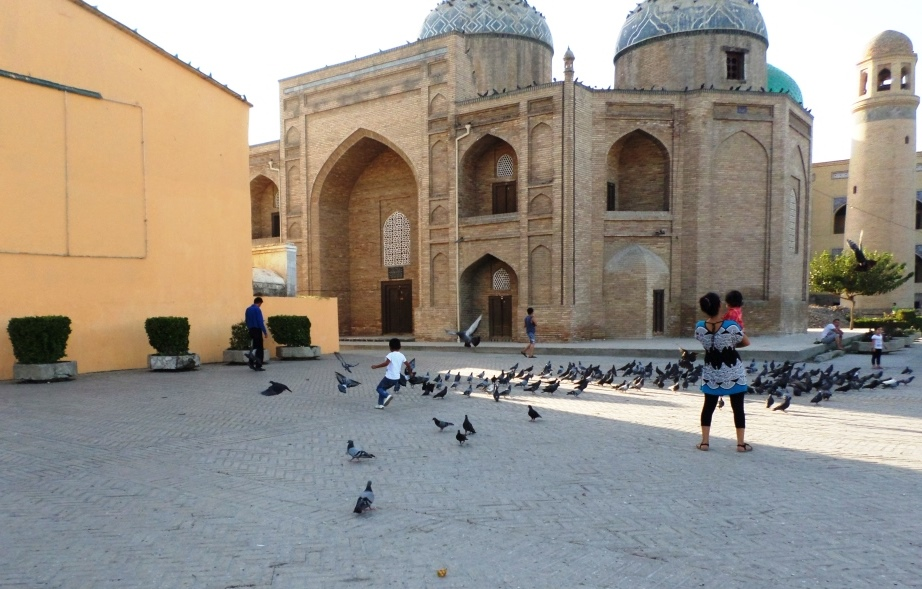
Sheikh Muslihiddin Mosque and Mausoleum

Today, the mausoleum of Sheikh Muslihiddin forms the centerpiece of a large religious and memorial complex. The ensemble includes:

- The mosque of Khujand
- A 19th-century minaret over 20 meters high
- Ancient burial grounds surrounding the mausoleum

The mausoleum itself is a two-storied domed structure with a monumental portal entrance. At its heart lies the ziyoratkhona, a cross-shaped hall used for commemoration, above the gurkhona, the burial vault beneath the dome. In the center stands a finely carved wooden sagona (sarcophagus), decorated with delicate geometric patterns, vegetal motifs, and ornamental inlays, an outstanding example of local woodcarving traditions.

The mosque complex features iwans supported by rows of columns arranged on a modular grid, carved wooden ceilings, remnants of painted decoration, and a mixture of burnt brick, raw brick, and plaster construction typical of medieval Khujand architecture.
