= Cyropolis =

Ancient Achaemenid city in Central Asia

Map of Tajikistan with possible locations of Cyropolis pinpointed.

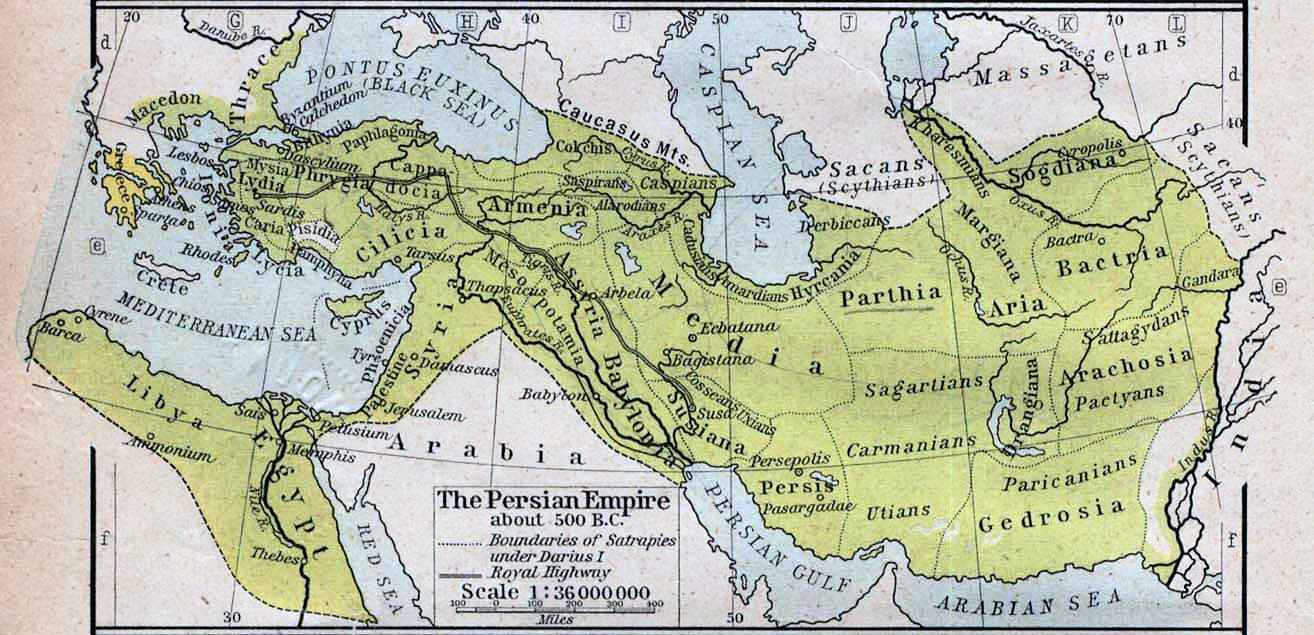
Map of the Achaemenid Empire showing the location of Cyropolis in Sogdiana.

Cyreschata (Old Persian: Kuruškaθa), better known by its Latin name Cyropolis (Ancient Greek: Κυρούπολις or Κύρου πόλις, Kyroúpolis), both meaning "City of Cyrus", was an ancient city founded by Cyrus the Great to mark the northeastern border of his Achaemenid Empire.

== Location ==
The actual location of this ancient city is currently undetermined. It is speculated that Alexander the Great may have established his own guard-town of Alexandria Eschate on the same location, simply renaming the Achaemenid city of Cyropolis. Potential sites include the medieval and modern city of Khujand in northern Tajikistan; Jizak on the Jaxartes river; and Ura-Tyube, the modern day city of Istaravshan.

Although some scholars have associated Cyropolis with the site of Istaravshan, modern day Kurkath near the Syr Darya presently seems the most convincing potential site due in part to the fact that its location conforms closer to ancient reports. To date, however, there hasn't been archeological evidence which would settle the question. Although Mug Tepe, the citadel of Ura-Tyube at Istaravshan, contains strata that has been dated to the 4th century BC, the ancient site of Shirin at Kurkath hasn't been thoroughly investigated to date even though the well-known burial vaults at Shirin belong to a later period.

== History ==
Cyropolis and the region around it was used as a sort of holding region for Greek populations that rebelled against Persia, being resettled there from their homelands around the coastline of what is now Turkey, a region largely settled by Greeks in the thousand years before its conquest by Persia under Xerxes and his successors. By the time of conflict with Alexander the Great, it had a large Greek population and culture.

Cyropolis was the largest of seven towns in the region that Alexander the Great targeted for conquest in 329 B.C. His goal was the conquest of Sogdiana. Alexander first sent Craterus to Cyropolis, the largest of the towns holding Sogdiana against Alexander's forces. Craterus' instructions were to "take up a position close to the town, surround it with a ditch and stockade, and then assemble such siege engines as might suit his purpose...." The idea was to keep the inhabitants focused on their own defenses and to prevent them from sending assistance out to the other towns. Starting from Gazza, Alexander went on to conquer the other surrounding towns. Five of the seven towns were taken in two days. Many of the inhabitants were killed. Alexander then arrived at Cyropolis, which was the best fortified of the towns and had the largest population. It also had reputedly the best fighters of the region.

Alexander battered Cyropolis' defenses with the siege engines. While the bombardment went on, Alexander ordered certain of his troops to sneak through a dried-up water course that went under the town's wall. Alexander also joined on this mission and once inside his troops opened the town's gate to admit his attacking force. Once the natives saw that the town was taken, they fell violently upon the attackers. Alexander received a violent blow from a stone that landed upon his head and neck. Craterus was wounded by an arrow. But the defenders were driven off. Arrian puts the defender's force at about 15,000 fighting men and claims that 8,000 of them were killed in the first phase of the operation. The rest apparently sought refuge inside the town's central fortress, but surrendered after one day for lack of water.

Accounts of how the battle went down differ among authors. Arrian cites Ptolemy as saying Cyropolis surrendered from the start, and Arrian also states that according to Aristobulus the place was stormed and everyone was massacred.
