= Siege of Khujand (1220) =

Mongol siege of Khujand

- Part of the Mongol invasion of the Khwarazmian Empire
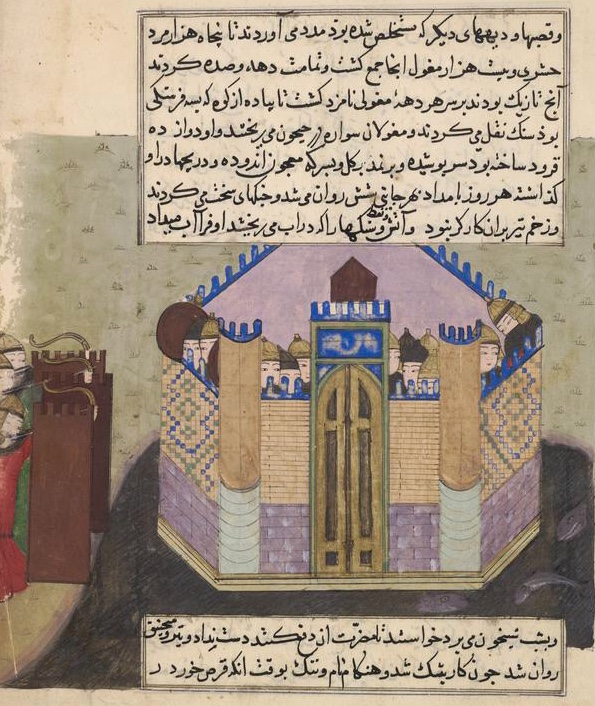
- Depiction of the 1220 Siege of Khujand. Tarikh-i Jahangushay by Ata-Malik Juvayni, 1438 copy.
Date	1220
Location	Khujand, Syr Darya, Tajikistan 40.279444°N 69.631944°E
Result	Mongol victory

Belligerents
Mongol Empire	Khwarazmian Empire

Commanders and leaders
Unknown	Timur Malik

Strength
20,000 Mongol soldiers 50,000 Prisoners	Unknown

Casualties and losses
Light	Heavy
- Location within Tajikistan

The Siege of Khujand was a siege by the Mongol army against the governor of the city of Khujand, Timur-Malik, during the Mongol invasion of the Khwarazmian Empire in 1220. This led to a Mongol victory and withdrawal of Timur-Malik who offered strong resistance before being forced to abandon the town. In which Timur-Malik fled to a small island in the Syr Darya.

== Background ==
In 1219–1220, during the Mongol invasion of the Khwarazmian Empire, Mongol forces advanced into Transoxiana and the Syr Darya region. According to René Grousset, a detachment of around 5,000 Mongols was dispatched toward the upper Syr Darya. After capturing Benaket, the force proceeded to besiege Khujand. The city was defended by its governor, Timur-Malik .

== Siege ==
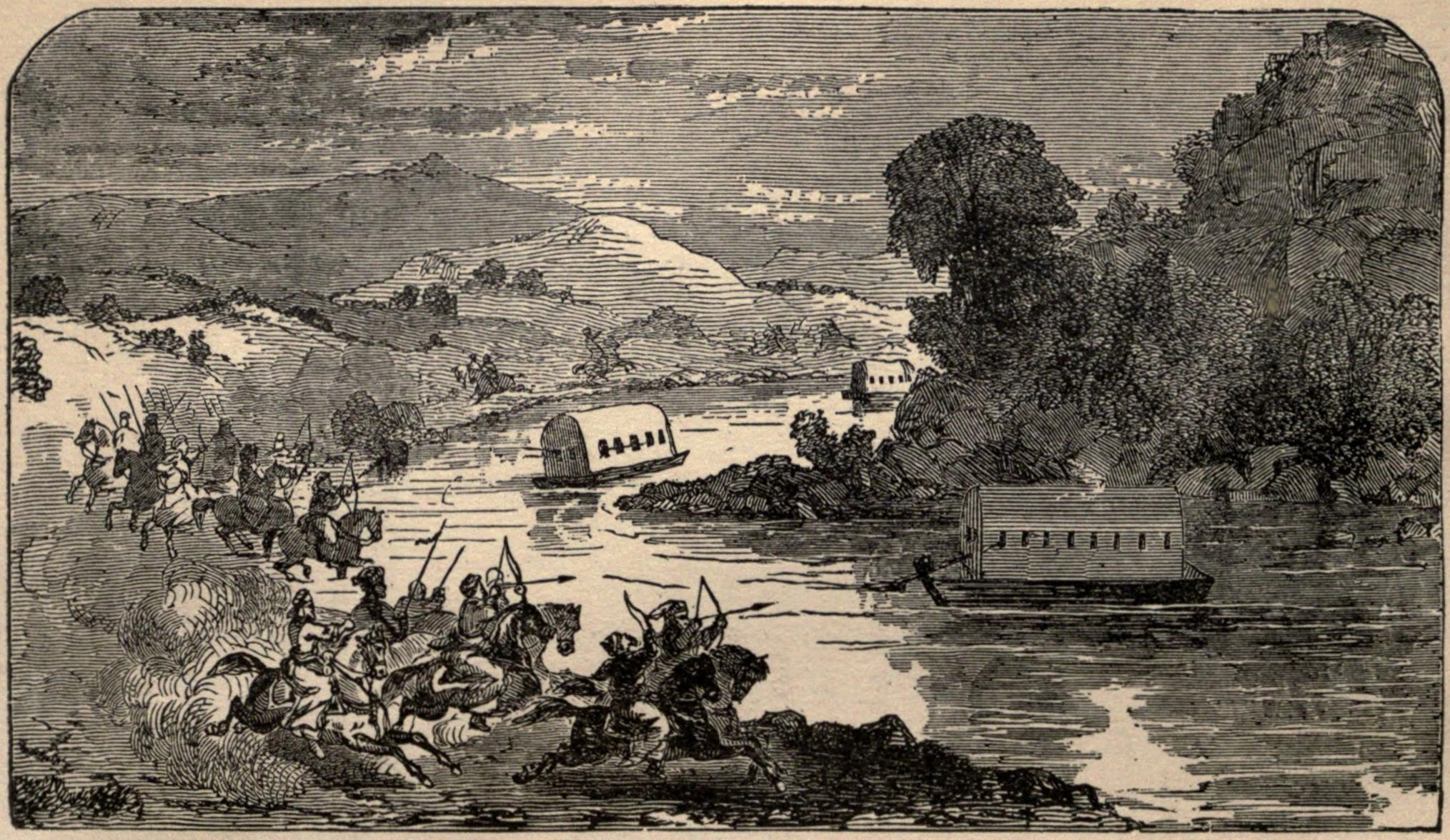
Timur Malik's defense of Khujand in 1220.

The Mongol forces continued operations along the Syr Darya. Barthold states that a portion of the Mongol army was dispatched against Khujand, where the governor, Timur-Malik, organized a determined defense.

According to Barthold, the siege involved about 20,000 Mongol troops and approximately 50,000 prisoners, reflecting the Mongols practice of employing captives during assaults on fortified towns. Prisoners were driven ahead of the attackers and forced to carry out dangerous tasks, while also serving as protection against missile fire from the defenders.

Barthold further notes that, after Timur-Malik was compelled to abandon the town, he escaped by sailing down the Syr Darya, forcing his way past Mongol forces positioned along the riverbanks. After leaving his boats, he continued his flight on horseback to Khwarazm.

== Aftermath ==
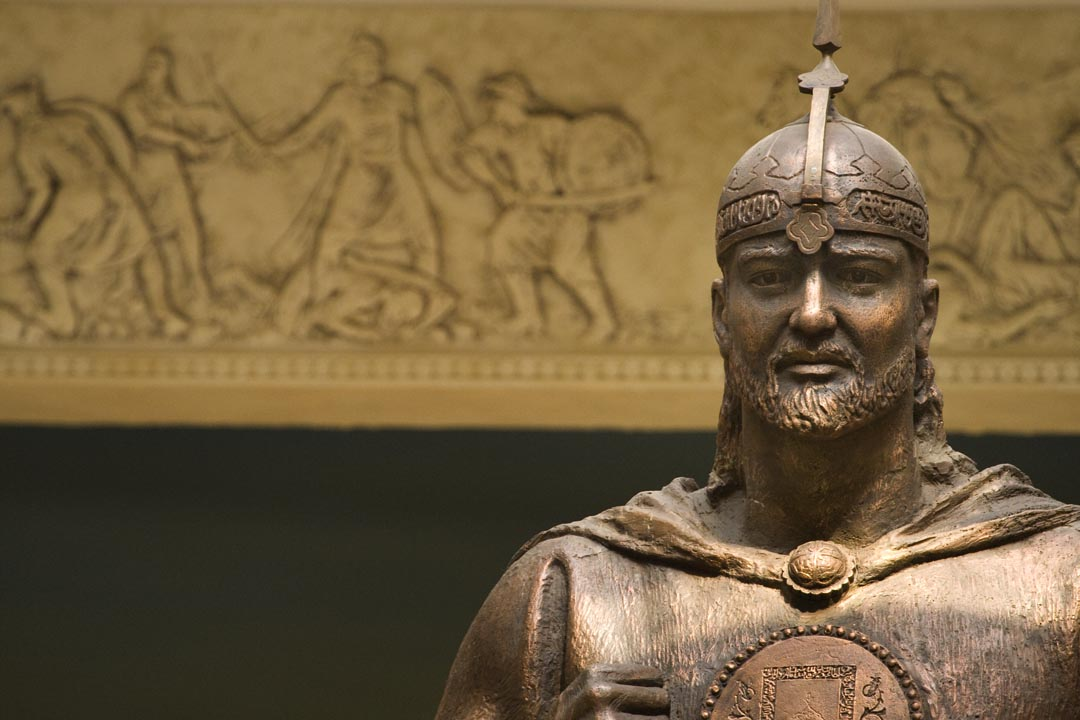
Statue of Timur-Malik in Khujand

After resisting the Mongols from an island fortress on the Syr Darya, Temür Malik was eventually forced to abandon his position when provisions and weapons began to run out. He evacuated his remaining force by boat during the night and attempted to escape down the river, while Mongol troops pursued him along both banks and attempted to block his passage. Although he succeeded in breaking through these obstacles, he ultimately lost his baggage and most of his followers, reaching Khwarazm safely alone. He later rejoined Jalal al-Din, but his survival had little effect on the wider course of the Mongol conquest.
