= Munzifa Gafarova =

Soviet Tajik philosopher and university lecturer

- Мунзифа Қаҳҳоровна Ғаффорова
- Born: 4 October 1924; Khujand, Tajikistan
- Died: 28 June 2013 (aged 88)
- Education: Leninabad Pedagogical Institute; Tajikistan Academy of Sciences (PhD)
- Occupation: Philosopher
- Known for: First Central Asian woman to earn a doctorate in philosophy
- Notable work: The Spiritual Aspect of the Women of the Soviet East (1969); The Women of the Mountain Republic (1974)
- Political party: Communist Party of the Soviet Union (from 1965)

Munzifa Ghafarova

Munzifa Kakharovna Gafarova (Tajik: Мунзифа Қаҳҳоровна Ғаффорова) (4 October 1924 – 28 June 2013) was a Tajikistani philosopher. She was the first woman from Central Asia to be awarded a doctorate in philosophy.

== Biography ==
Born in Khujand, Ghafforova was the daughter of two of the first teachers to work in the city. She graduated from the Leninabad Pedagogical Institute in 1944, and from that year until 1947 served as a secretary of the local Komsomol committee and director of the Tajikistan branch of the Cultural Committee of the Communist Party of the Soviet Union. In 1948 she married Solijon Rajabov, first secretary of the Central Committee of the Young Communist League of the Tajik SSR, with whom she would go on to have numerous children.

== Career ==
Between 1952 and 1955 she was a postgraduate student of philosophy at the Tajikistan Academy of Sciences; upon graduation, she became a senior instructor in the Department of Marxism–Leninism at the women's section of the Dushanbe Pedagogical Institute. She served in this capacity until 1957, when she became an assistant professor, continuing in that role until being named head of the Department of Philosophy in 1962. She joined the Communist Party of the Soviet Union in 1965. In 1968 she received her doctorate in philosophy, and in 1970 she became a professor. In 1975 she became dean of the institute. Ghafforova was interested in the development of the personalities of women in the eastern Soviet Union. Among her writings are The Spiritual Aspect of the Women of the Soviet East (Dushanbe, 1969) and The Women of the Mountain Republic (Dushanbe, 1974); furthermore, she published over 200 articles and papers during her career. For her work she was named a Distinguished Scientific Contributor to Tajik Culture in 1974, and received numerous awards, among them the Order of the Red Banner of Labour twice, the Order of Friendship of Peoples, and the Honorary Order of the Presidium of the Supreme Soviet of Tajikistan.
