= Manzura Uldjabaeva =

Tajikistani artist

Manzura Uldjabaeva (born 1952, Khujand) is a Tajikistani artist and cinematographer. From 1976 to 1993 she was the costume designer for the Tajikfilm studios. She worked on over 25 films and in 1987 became a member of the Cinematographer and Artists' Union of the USSR. Since 2004, she has been a member of the Designers’ Union of the Republic of Tajikistan. She joined the faculty of the prestigious Olimov State Art College in Dushanbe in 1993.
