= Timur Malik =

Statesman in the service of Khwarazmshahs (11th-12th centuries CE)

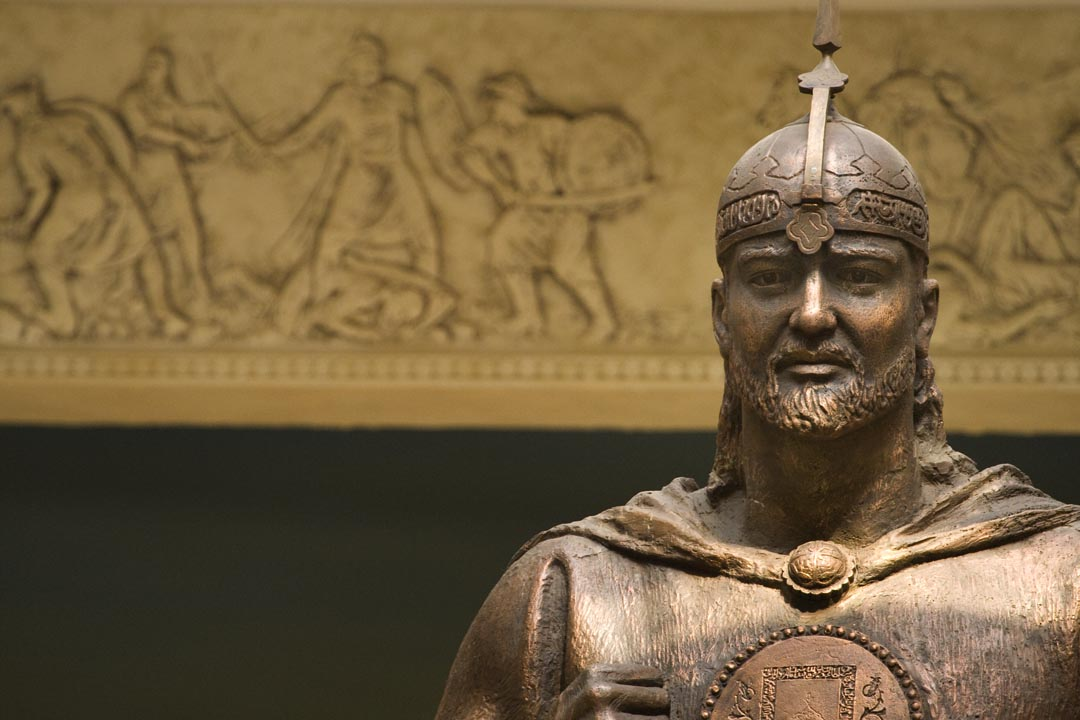
Statue of Timur Malik in Khujand, Tajikistan.

Timur Malik was a statesman of the Khwarazmian Empire, who served as the governor of Khujand in the region of Transoxiana. He is known for his valiant though ultimately unsuccessful defense of Khujand in 1219-1220 during the Mongol invasions. He has been described in a historical novel authored by a famous Urdu novelist Nasim Hejazi, the novel is titled Akhri Chattan (آخری چٹان).

His ethnicity is unknown but his name is in Turkic and Arabic. ”Temur” means Iron in Turkic, and ”Malik” means ”The King” in Arabic. Temur Malik is considered as a national hero by Tajikistan.

== Biography ==
Timur Malik was sometime before the Mongol invasions appointed as the governor of Khujand, a city famous for its vineyards and gardens, for its trade, and for the bold citizens. The city also had a citadel, and when the Mongols arrived, the citizens withdrew behind its walls.

He died in 1220 defending the city against the Mongols.

== Sources ==
- Browne, E. G. (1998). A Literary History of Persia, Volume 1. Psychology Press. pp. 1–2268. ISBN 9780700704064.
- Haqqi, Anwarul Haque (2010). Chingiz Khan: The Life and Legacy of an Empire Builder. Primus Books. pp. 1–326. ISBN 9788190891899.
- Soucek, Svat (2000). A History of Inner Asia. Cambridge University Press. pp. 1–369. ISBN 9780521657044. "false."
- ҒАФУРОВ, БОБОҶОН, ed. (17 February 2000). Тоҷикон Бобоҷон Ғафуров. Душанбе Нашриёти "Дониш". pp. 550 1–369. ISBN 9780521657044.
