= Ashura Nosirova =

- Born: December 20, 1924
- Died: January 5, 2011 (aged 86); Dushanbe, Tajikistan
- Occupation: Dancer

Ashura Nosirova (Tajik: Ашӯра Носирова, Russian: Ашура Насы́рова; 20 December 1924 – 5 January 2011) was a Soviet and Tajikistani dancer.

== Biography ==
Born in the village of Qistakuz in Khujand, Nosirova was the daughter of musician Nosiri Surnaichi. From 1934 until 1939 she studied at the Women's Technical School in Stalinabad; it was while there that she began dancing, performing as an amateur. She came to wider attention in 1939 when she participated in a review of talent. That same year she was invited to perform at the kolkhoz in Stalinabad. She joined the Tajikistan State Philharmonic Society as a dancer in 1940, remaining a member of the company until 1960. She spent time honing her skills by working with the Ensemble of Soviet Dancers. She traveled with other Tajik artists to the front during World War II, performing for soldiers there. She also traveled abroad to perform during her career. In 1951 she became a member of the Communist Party of the Soviet Union. Nosira blended elements of classical Tajik dance with aspects of ballet in her performances. Among her most noted dances were those titled Tovus ("Peacock"), "Shodiona" ("Joyful"), "Kabutari Surkh" ("Red Pigeon"), "Naqorabazm" ("Drum Party"), "Pakhta" ("Cotton"), "Vokhuri" ("Meeting"), "Bozii Kalon" ("The Big Game"), and "Dilbar" ("Ravisher"). For her work Nosira received numerous awards and medals during her career, including the Order of the Red Banner of Labour and three Orders of the Badge of Honour. In 1947 she was named a People's Artist of the Tajik SSR.

== See also ==
- Culture of Tajikistan
