= Gazza, Tajikistan =

Gazza
- Location in Tajikistan
- Coordinates: 39°15′13″N 68°3′2″E
- Country: Tajikistan
- Region: Sughd Region
- City: Panjakent
- Elevation: 2,328 m (7,638 ft)

Gazza (Tajik: Ғазза Ghazza) is a village in Sughd Region, northern Tajikistan. It is part of the jamoat Voru in the city of Panjakent.
