= Aristobulus of Cassandreia =

Greek historian (c. 375 BC – 301 BC)

Aristobulus of Cassandreia (Ancient Greek: Ἀριστόβουλος ὁ Κασσανδρεὺς; c. 375 BC – 301 BC), Greek historian, son of Aristobulus, probably a Phocian settled in Cassandreia, accompanied Alexander the Great on his campaigns. He served throughout as an architect and military engineer as well as a close friend of Alexander, enjoying royal confidence, and was entrusted with the repair of the tomb of Cyrus the Great in Pasargadae. He wrote an account, mainly geographical and ethnological. It survives only in quotations by others, which may not all be faithful to the original. His work was largely used by Arrian. Plutarch also used him as a reference.
