= Tajikistan–Uzbekistan border =

International border

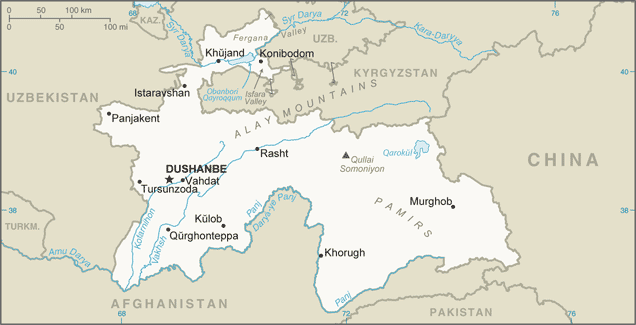
Left: Boundary markers of Tajikistan and Uzbekistan. Right: Map of Tajikistan showing the border with Uzbekistan.

The Tajikistan–Uzbekistan border is an international border between Tajikistan and Uzbekistan. It is 1,312 kilometres (815 mi) in length and runs from the tripoint with Kyrgyzstan to the tripoint with Afghanistan.

== Description ==
The border starts in the north at the tripoint with Kyrgyzstan, proceeding west, north-west, north-east along the Syr Darya river and finally north-west to reach the Qurama Mountains. The border then follows this range westwards, before turning south in the vicinity of the Uzbek town of Olmaliq at the Syr Darya river. The next section of the boundary is extremely convoluted, with a long protrusion of Tajik territory (Zafarobod District) and a series of irregular lines; eventually the border proceeds roughly southwards before turning sharply west upon reaching the Turkestan Range. The border then follows a ‘C’ shape, with Uzbekistan's Zaamin National Park and the Turkestan Mountains in the north, the Zerafshan Range in the middle, and the Gissar Range in the south. The border then follows a roughly southwards line down to the Afghan tripoint; part of the border follows the Kofarnihon River, and it traverses the Babatag Range and Tuyuntau Range.

== Enclaves ==
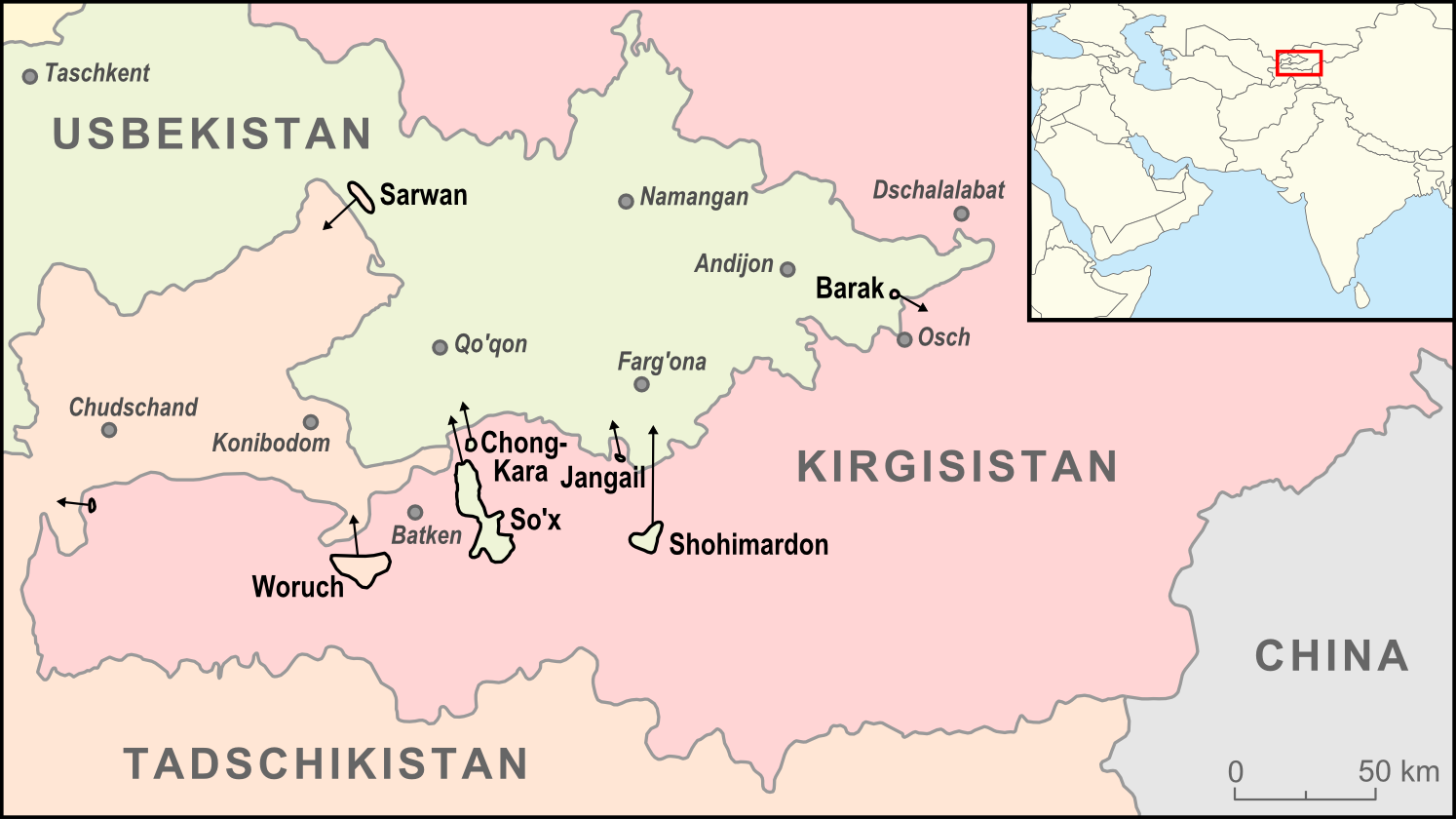
Map showing Tajikistan's Sarvan enclave

There is one enclave along this border, Sarvan, a long, thin piece of Tajik territory lying within Uzbekistan, north of the Tajik town of Punuk.

== History ==
Russia had conquered Central Asia in the 19th century by annexing the formerly independent Khanates of Kokand and Khiva and the Emirate of Bukhara. After the Communists took power in 1917 and created the Soviet Union it was decided to divide Central Asia into ethnically-based republics in a process known as National Territorial Delimitation (or NTD). This was in line with Communist theory that nationalism was a necessary step on the path towards an eventually communist society, and Joseph Stalin's definition of a nation as being “a historically constituted, stable community of people, formed on the basis of a common language, territory, economic life, and psychological make-up manifested in a common culture”.

The NTD is commonly portrayed as being nothing more than a cynical exercise in divide and rule, a deliberately Machiavellian attempt by Stalin to maintain Soviet hegemony over the region by artificially dividing its inhabitants into separate nations and with borders deliberately drawn so as to leave minorities within each state. Though indeed the Soviets were concerned at the possible threat of pan-Turkic nationalism, as expressed for example with the Basmachi movement of the 1920s, closer analysis informed by the primary sources paints a much more nuanced picture than is commonly presented.

The Soviets aimed to create ethnically homogeneous republics, however many areas were ethnically-mixed (e.g. the Ferghana Valley) and it often proved difficult to assign a ‘correct’ ethnic label to some peoples (e.g. the mixed Tajik-Uzbek Sart, or the various Turkmen/Uzbek tribes along the Amu Darya). Local national elites strongly argued (and in many cases overstated) their case and the Soviets were often forced to adjudicate between them, further hindered by a lack of expert knowledge and the paucity of accurate or up-to-date ethnographic data on the region. Furthermore, NTD also aimed to create ‘viable’ entities, with economic, geographical, agricultural and infrastructural matters also to be taken into account and frequently trumping those of ethnicity. The attempt to balance these contradictory aims within an overall nationalist framework proved exceedingly difficult and often impossible, resulting in the drawing of often tortuously convoluted borders, multiple enclaves and the unavoidable creation of large minorities who ended up living in the ‘wrong’ republic. Additionally the Soviets never intended for these borders to become international frontiers as they are today.

Soviet Central Asia in 1922 before national delimitation

NTD of the area along ethnic lines had been proposed as early as 1920. At this time Central Asia consisted of two Autonomous Soviet Socialist Republics (ASSRs) within the Russian SFSR: the Turkestan ASSR, created in April 1918 and covering large parts of what are now southern Kazakhstan, Uzbekistan and Tajikistan, as well as Turkmenistan), and the Kirghiz Autonomous Soviet Socialist Republic (Kirghiz ASSR, Kirgizistan ASSR on the map), which was created on 26 August 1920 in the territory roughly coinciding with the northern part of today's Kazakhstan (at this time Kazakhs were referred to as ‘Kyrgyz’ and what are now the Kyrgyz were deemed a sub-group of the Kazakhs and referred to as ‘Kara-Kyrgyz’ i.e. mountain-dwelling ‘black-Kyrgyz’). There were also the two separate successor ‘republics’ of the Emirate of Bukhara and the Khanate of Khiva, which were transformed into the Bukhara and Khorezm People's Soviet Republics following the takeover by the Red Army in 1920.

On 25 February 1924 the Politburo and Central Committee of the Soviet Union announced that it would proceed with NTD in Central Asia. The process was to be overseen by a Special Committee of the Central Asian Bureau, with three sub-committees for each of what were deemed to be the main nationalities of the region (Kazakhs, Turkmen and Uzbeks), with work then exceedingly rapidly. There were initial plans to possibly keep the Khorezm and Bukhara PSRs, however it was eventually decided to partition them in April 1924, over the often vocal opposition of their Communist Parties (the Khorezm Communists in particular were reluctant to destroy their PSR and had to be strong-armed into voting for their own dissolution in July of that year).

Of all the Central Asian borders, that between what would later become Tajikistan and Uzbekistan proved the most complex and divisive. Populations here were extremely mixed, and there was a weak sense of Tajik/Uzbek identity in many areas, with many instead identifying as Sart. Tajik nationalism in particular was poorly developed at this point, and the extremely limited number of Tajik Communists were unable to push a strong case against the much more vocal Uzbeks, many of whom deemed the Tajiks to be merely ‘Persianised’ Uzbeks. Therefore, when the Uzbek SSR was created in 1924 the Tajik areas were included within it as the Tajik ASSR (minus the Khojand region, which was included directly within the Uzbek SSR).

The Uzbek SSR as originally constituted, including the directly administered Khojand region and the Tajik ASSR. At this point a then-larger Karakalpakstan was included within the Kazakh ASSR

Over the following years it appears that Tajik nationalism developed, especially amongst the small elite of Tajik Communists. They increasingly came to resent their ‘lesser’ status within the Uzbek SSR, and chafed against what was seen as Uzbek dominance and high-handedness. As a result of these increasing tensions the Soviets decided to revisit the Tajik-Uzbek question in 1929. The Central Asian Bureau identified the cities of Samarkand, Bukhara and Khojand as the main Tajik-inhabited cities, though this was complicated by the mixed nature of settlement in the surrounding areas; there were also debates about Termez and the Surxondaryo Region, claimed by both sides. In the end the Tajiks only gained the Khojand region, with the Uzbeks retaining Bukhara, Samarkand and the Surxondaryo region. The new Tajik SSR was officially created on 5 December 1929, incorporating the Gorno-Badakshan Autonomous Oblast. The Tajiks continued to push for a rectification of what they saw as an unfair delimitation. Shorn of any major cities, the Tajik SSR was to be governed from the small town of Dushanbe, later renamed Stalinabad.

The boundary became an international frontier in 1991 following the dissolution of the Soviet Union and the independence of its constituent republics. Tensions since then have been high, with several high-level Tajik politicians asserting the traditional claim to Bukhara and Samarkand, and Uzbek politicians asserting their right to protect Uzbeks living in Tajikistan. Uzbekistan accused Tajikistan of allowing the Islamic Movement of Uzbekistan (IMU) to base itself in its territory; following the 1999 Tashkent bombings, said by Tashkent to be the work of the IMU, Uzbekistan began unilaterally demarcating and mining the border. Relations between the two states have markedly improved since the death of Uzbek President Islam Karimov in 2016; new president Shavkat Mirziyoyev has vowed to improve relations with Tajikistan, and there have been recent high-level moves to de-mine the border and improve cross-border travel.

== Border crossings ==
Listed North to South:

Tajik name	Uzbek name	Type of crossing	Coordinates
Ravot	Rapqon	bilateral road	40.322156 N 70.564563 E
Patar	Andarxon	international road	40.364629 N 70.455805 E
Istilkol	Suvonobod	railway	40.367445 N 70.448917 E
Navbunyod	Sadoqat	bilateral road	40.766554 N 70.740130 E
Fotehobod (TJK)	Oybek	international road	40.54622 N 69.21217 E
Sarband (Kushtegirmon)	Farhod	bilateral road	40.196880 N 69.300717 E
Nov	Bekabad	railway	40.20051 N 69.26472 E
Khashtiyak	Bekabad	bilateral road	40.213735 N 69.205520 E
Zafarobod	Xovos	bilateral road	40.19494 N 68.84741 E
Khavatag (south of Zafarobod)	Uchurgan	bilateral road	40.13587 N 68.89406 E
Uroteppa, Istaravshan	Qoshqand	bilateral road	40.06152 N 68.94719 E
Sarazm	Jartepa	bilateral road	39.51805 N 67.39992 E
Dusti, Tursunzoda	Sariosiyo, Sufion	international road	38.50341 N 68.10536 E
Pakhtaobod	Kudukli	railway	38.407137 N 68.064508 E
Khoshadi	Gulbahor	railway	37.19596 N 67.79734 E
Aivadj	Gulbahor	international road	37.195766 N 67.796513 E

== Settlements near the border ==
=== Tajikistan ===
- Lakkon
- Kulkent
- Navgilem
- Isfara
- Konibodom
- Punuk
- Jarbulak
- Paldorak
- Buston
- Mastchoh
- Kuruksoi
- Obburdon
- Farmonkurgon
- Zafarobod
- Mehnatobod
- Istaravshan
- Shahriston
- Panjakent
- Farob
- Pakhtaobod
- Tursunzoda

=== Uzbekistan ===
- Olmaliq
- Bekabad
- Khavast
- Ulyanovo
- Urgut
- Denov

== See also ==
- Extreme points of Tajikistan
- Extreme points of Uzbekistan
- Geography of Uzbekistan
