= Konibodom District =

- District
- Location of Konibodom District in Tajikistan
- Country: Tajikistan
- Region: Sughd Region
- Capital: Konibodom
- Time zone: UTC+5 (TJT)

Konibodom District or Nohiya-i Konibodom (Tajik: Ноҳияи Конибодом) is a former district in Sughd Region, Tajikistan. Its capital was Konibodom. Around 2018, it was merged into the city of Konibodom.

== Administrative divisions ==
The district was divided administratively into jamoats. They were as follows (and population).

Jamoats of Konibodom District
Jamoat	Population
Hamrabaev	20332
Lohuti	15539
Ortikov	19198
Patar	13956
Pulatan	26031
Sharipov	18750
