= Tajik =

Tajik, Tajikistan, or Tajikistani may refer to:

- Someone or something related to Tajikistan
- Tajiks, an ethnic group in Tajikistan, Afghanistan, and Uzbekistan
- Tajik language, the official language of Tajikistan
- Tajik alphabet, the alphabet used to write the Tajik language
- Tajik (word), a historical term for Iranian peoples
- Tajik Air, an airline in Tajikistan
- Tajik Internal Troops, the internal security force of Tajikistan
- Tajik Soviet Socialist Republic, a republic of the Soviet Union from 1929 to 1991
- Tajik (surname)
- Tajik cuisine
- Tajik music
- Tajik, Iran, a village in North Khorasan Province, Iran

== Tajikistan ==
- Flag of Tajikistan, the national flag of Tajikistan
- Culture of Tajikistan, the pattern of human activity and symbolism
- Demographics of Tajikistan
- Geography of Tajikistan, an overview of the geography of Tajikistan
- Economy of Tajikistan, the national economy
- Politics of Tajikistan, the political system of Tajikistan
- Tajikistan Independence Day Military Parade
- Tajikistan Higher League, a football league

=== National teams ===
- Tajikistan national cricket team, the international cricket team of Tajikistan
- Tajikistan national football team, the national association football team
- Tajikistan national football team fixtures and results
- Tajikistan national badminton team, the Tajikistan national badminton team
- Tajikistan women's national football team, the women's national association football team representing Tajikistan
- Tajikistan women's national football team results

=== Asian Games ===
- Tajikistan at the Asian Games, a sporting event delegation
- Tajikistan at the 2014 Asian Games, a sporting event delegation
- Tajikistan at the 2018 Asian Games, a sporting event delegation
- Tajikistan at the 2022 Asian Games, Tajikistan at the multi‑sports event

== Tajikistani ==
- Tajikistani ruble, the former currency of Tajikistan
- Tajikistani somoni, the currency of Tajikistan
- Tajikistani Revolution, the 1992 protests in Tajikistan
- Tajikistani Civil War, an armed conflict

== Other uses ==
- Sarikoli language, spoken by Tajiks in China and officially referred to as the 'Tajik language' in China
- The Arabic‑schooled, ethnically Persian administrative officials of the Turco-Persian society
- List of Tajikistani records in athletics
- List of Tajikistani detainees at Guantanamo Bay

== See also ==
- Tajikistan–Uzbekistan relations
- Tajikistan–Uzbekistan border
- Tajikistan–Uzbekistan border minefields
