= Lohuti =

Lohuti may refer to:

- Abolqasem Lahouti
- Lohuti, Tajikistan
