= Tajikistan–Uzbekistan relations =

- Tajikistan: Uzbekistan

Tajikistan–Uzbekistan relations refers to the relations between the Republic of Tajikistan and the Republic of Uzbekistan.

During the presidency of Islam Karimov, analysts said that the two countries are "engaged in an undeclared cold war" and have the worst bilateral relations in Central Asia. However, with the election of Shavkat Mirziyoyev as President of Uzbekistan, Uzbek-Tajik relations, as well as relations between Uzbekistan and its neighbors in Central Asia, reached a new era of potential. Practical implementation of this potential is yet to be seen and by 2020 the Central Asian region remains one of the least integrated regions in the world.

== Historical relations ==
The Russian Empire (1721–1917) controlled Russian Turkestan as a singular unit; the creation of "nations" within Central Asia was not on the agenda of Russian policy makers. However, revolutionary fervor from the Turkish War of Independence (1919–1923) spilled over from the former Ottoman Empire into Russian lands. Based on the ideology of Pan-Turkism, which seeks to unite all speakers of Turkic languages from Anatolia to China into a single state, the Young Turk leader Enver Pasha lead the Basmachi Revolt in Soviet Central Asia. However, pan-Turkist reformers and Jadids, even members of the anti-Basmachi Communist Party of Turkestan, were hostile to the claim of Tajiks and other non-Turkic peoples to a separate identity in Central Asia.

The establishment of the Uzbek Soviet Socialist Republic (commonly known as Uzbekistan) in 1924 as part of national delimitation in the Soviet Union resulted in the Uzbekization of the Tajik cultural centers of Samarcand and Bukhara, as well as of all Tajiks in Uzbekistan and Tajikistan, since Tajikistan was not afforded the status of its own Soviet Socialist Republic. Eventually, however, the Tajik Soviet Socialist Republic (also known as Tajikistan in short) was created in 1929. Turkic, Caucasian, Cossack, and Crimean collaborationism with the Axis powers during World War II resulted in a reaction from Soviet authorities which included population transfers that brought Caucasians to Central Asia.

Both republics participated in the referendum in March 1991 in an attempt to preserve the Soviet Union in a different form, but was soon hampered by the attempted coup in August of that year. As a consequence, both Uzbekistan and Tajikistan declared their independence in the months of 1991 and became members of the Commonwealth of Independent States, in which officially gave way for the dismemberment of the Soviet Union at the end of the year.

Flag of the Uzbek Soviet Socialist Republic

Flag of the Tajik Soviet Socialist Republic

== Military relations ==
After the Soviet Union fell in 1991, conflicts between both groups emerged when Tajiks attacked Uzbek goods in Tajikistan whilst Uzbeks banned Tajik goods in Uzbekistan. The Civil war in Tajikistan broke out when ethnic groups in Tajikistan began clashing, and they later engaged into a war with devastating casualties. During this war, Uzbek troops entered into Tajikistan to prevent war, but their efforts were futile due to personal disagreements between leaders of both countries. Nevertheless, Uzbekistan received a flood of Uzbek and Tajik refugees from Tajikistan due to the ongoing war, most of whom remained in Uzbekistan after the war.

=== Rogun dam ===
Tajikistan had long planned to build what would be the world's largest hydropower dam, the Rogun Dam, on the Vakhsh River. The project was initially proposed by Soviet engineers in the 1950s, but actual construction was postponed by the dissolution of the Soviet Union in 1991. The dam would bring energy independence to Tajikistan, but Uzbekistan argues it would damage its lucrative cotton industry by drying up rivers. In 2012, Uzbekistan president Islam Karimov warned, without naming Tajikistan, that certain dam projects may lead to a regional war in Central Asia.

== Economic relations ==
=== Gas export to Tajikistan ===
Tajikistan depends mainly on gas imported from Uzbekistan, and has few other energy sources; as a result, it suffers from chronic electricity shortages. Uzbekistan uses the energy arm to curb Tajikistan in the Rogun Dam dispute. Analysts estimate Tajikistan's gas requirements at 1.2 billion m³/year while in 2012, the country only received one-tenth of this amount at a price of US$300/1000 m³. This quantity has been enough to operate just one Tajik power plant.

=== Kamchik Pass railway ===
In 2013, Uzbekistan announced its plan to build a new railway through the Kamchik Pass, connecting the cities of Tashkent and Namangan. The new railway route will replace the old Soviet-era railway that cuts through northern Tajikistan. It would save Uzbekistan a reported $25 million per year in transit fees, and may become part of a long-planned rail route to China. Tajik experts have stated concern that this would potentially further isolate Tajikistan which is already the poorest country in the region. In February 2015, the World Bank announced it would loan $195 million towards the construction of the railway.

== Political relations ==
Shavkat Mirziyoyev and Emomali Rahmon met several times between September 2016, and March 2018, where Mirziyoyev made an historic visit to Dushanbe. 27 bilateral agreements were signed in the fields of trade, economy, investment, finance, transport and transit, agriculture, water and energy, taxes, customs, tourism, education and science, health, culture, interregional cooperation, in the field of security and countering crime.

In 2024, Tajik smugglers were caught trafficking drugs in Uzbekistan multiple times.

Tajik–Uzbek relations advanced significantly with the entry into force of the Treaty on Alliance Relations on 31 March 2025, following a ratification exchange in Khujand. Initially signed on 18 April 2023, in Dushanbe, the treaty formalized a strategic partnership, reinforcing political, economic, and security ties between the two nations. The agreement reflects ongoing efforts to solidify long-term cooperation and marks a notable improvement in bilateral relations.

During President Rahmon's state visit to Uzbekistan in March 2026, the two countries launched 10 joint projects. These include new businesses making leather products and furniture, increased manufacture of home appliances, Tajikistani textile factories, and Tashkent construction projects.

== Cultural relations ==
=== 2031 AFC Asian Cup ===
On 24 February 2025, the Central Asian Football Association announced a historic bid between Kyrgyzstan, Tajikistan, and Uzbekistan to bring the Asian Cup to Central Asia for the first time.

== State Visits ==
=== Presidential visits from Uzbekistan to Tajikistan ===
- Islam Karimov - (2000)
- Shavkat Mirziyoyev - (March 2018)

=== Presidential visits from Tajikistan to Uzbekistan ===
- Emomali Rahmon - (1998)
- Emomali Rahmon - (June 2016)
- Emomali Rahmon - (September 2016)
- Emomali Rahmon - (August 2018)
- Emomali Rahmon - (March 2026)

== See also ==
- Tajikistan-Uzbekistan border
- Kyrgyzstan–Uzbekistan border
- Tajikistan–Uzbekistan border minefields
- Foreign relations of Tajikistan
- Foreign relations of Uzbekistan
- Tajiks in Kazakhstan
- Tajiks in Uzbekistan
- 2022 Karakalpak protests
- Extreme points of Tajikistan
