= Aybek =

Aybek may refer to:

- Aybek Abdymomunov (born 1985), amateur boxer from Kyrgyzstan
- Aybek Altynbekov (born 1978), Kyrgyz politician
- Aybek Orozaliyev, Kyrgyzstani football midfielder
- Ezzidin Aybek or Izz al-Din Aybak (died 1257), sultan of Egypt
- Aybek (writer), real name Musa Tashmukhamedov (1905–1968), Uzbek poet and writer

== See also ==
- Aïbeg (fl. 1247), Mongol envoy to Europe
- Oybek (disambiguation)
