= Sughdiyon =

- Town
- Location in Tajikistan
- Coordinates: 40°29′N 69°26′E
- Country: Tajikistan
- Region: Sughd Region
- District: Mastchoh District

Population (2020)
  - Total: 2,700
- Time zone: UTC+5 (TJT)
- Official languages: Russian (Interethnic); Tajik (State)

Sughdiyon or Sugdiyan (Russian: Сугдиян; Tajik: Суғдиён, formerly: Takeli) is a town in north-western Tajikistan. It is located in Mastchoh District in Sughd Region. The town has a total population of 2,700.
