= Mastchoh District =

- District
- Location of Mastchoh District in Tajikistan
- Coordinates: 40°32′N 69°25′E
- Country: Tajikistan
- Region: Sughd Region
- Capital: Buston

Area
  - Total: 1,000 km^{2} (390 sq mi)

Population (2020)
  - Total: 128,400
  - Density: 130/km^{2} (330/sq mi)
- Time zone: UTC+5 (TJT)

Mastchoh District or Nohiya-i Mastchoh (Tajik: Ноҳияи Мастчоҳ, Nohiya‘i Mastçoh/Nohijaji Mastcoh) is a district in Sughd Region, Tajikistan. It is located at the extreme north of the country, between Ghafurov district and the border with Uzbekistan. The district population is 128,400 (1 January 2020 est.) and its administrative capital is Buston.

== Administrative divisions ==
The district has an area of about 1,000 km^{2} (400 sq mi) and is divided administratively into three towns and four jamoats. They are as follows:

Jamoat	Population (Jan. 2015)
Buston (town)	13,600
Obshoron (town)	3,100
Sughdiyon (town)	2,300
Mastchoh	21,929
Navbahor	13,388
Obburdon	37,104
Paldorak	20,837
