= Bostondeh =

- Location in Tajikistan
- Coordinates: 39°29′21″N 67°32′6″E
- Country: Tajikistan
- Region: Sughd Region
- City: Panjakent

Bostondeh (Tajik: Бостондеҳ, formerly Urtaqishloq) is a village in Sughd Region, northern Tajikistan. It is part of the jamoat Sarazm in the city of Panjakent. It is located on the RB12 highway.
