= Tajik (surname) =

The surname Tajik may refer to:

- Pouya Tajik, Iranian basketball player
- Samantha Tajik, Iranian-Canadian actress, model, and TV personality
- Hadia Tajik
- Abdul Jamil Tajik, Pakistani American physician and medical investigator

== See also ==
- Tajik (disambiguation)
