= Sohibnazar =

Sohibnazar Соҳибназар Сохибназар · دورمان
- Location in Tajikistan
- Coordinates: 39°30′34″N 67°27′2″E
- Country: Tajikistan
- Region: Sughd Region
- City: Panjakent
- Official languages: Russian (Interethnic); Tajik (State)

Sohibnazar (Russian: Сохибназар; Tajik: Соҳибназар, also: Durman) is a village in north-west Tajikistan. It is located in Sughd Region. It is part of the city of Panjakent. The archaeological site of the ancient city of Sarazm is located near the village.
