= Lutfi Zohidova =

Soviet and Tajik ballet dance

- Лутфи Зоҳидова
- Born: 6 November 1925; Konibodom, Tajik ASSR, Uzbek SSR, Soviet Union
- Died: 10 October 1995 (aged 69)
- Occupation: Ballet dancer
- Organization: Tajik Ballet

Lutfi Zohidova (Tajik: Лутфи Зоҳидова, Russian: Лютфи́ Захи́дова; 6 November 1925 – 10 October 1995) was a Soviet and Tajik ballet dancer.

== Biography ==
Zohidova was born in Konibodom, Tajik ASSR, and became a member of the Communist Party of the Soviet Union in 1957. She studied at the Dushanbe Women's Pedagogical Institute, and from 1939 until 1941 was a member of the Union of Workers Ensemble in Moscow; in the latter year she was accepted as a member of the Tajik Ballet. Her debut with the company came in La fille mal gardée by Peter Ludwig Hertel, and she performed as a soloist at the theater throughout the 1940s and 1950s. Among the most notable roles which she essayed during her career were Maria in The Fountain of Bakhchisarai by Boris Asafyev; Odette in Swan Lake by Pyotr Ilyich Tchaikovsky; Layla in Layla and Majnun by Sergey Balasanian; and the title roles in Cinderella by Sergei Prokofiev; La Esmeralda by Cesare Pugni, and Dilbar by Alexander Lensky. She also directed the Dushanbe School of Choreography for a time. She toured with the company in June 1961, and shortly thereafter, retired from the ballet and became an instructor.

== Awards and honors ==
- Stalin Prize, 2nd class (1949) – for her portrayal of Layla in the ballet play Layla and Majnun by Sergey Balasanian
- People's Artist of the Tajik SSR (1949)
- Order of the Badge of Honour (1954)
- People's Artist of the USSR (1957)
- Order of Friendship of Peoples
- Order of the Red Banner of Labour
