= Mukarrama Qosimova =

Tajikistani linguist and academic (1933–2020)

- Born: Mukarrama Nabievna Qosimova; 16 January 1933; Konibodom, Tajik SSR, Soviet Union
- Died: 2 October 2020 (aged 87); Dushanbe, Tajikistan

Academic background
- Education: Tajik National University

Academic work
- Discipline: Linguistics

Mukarrama Nabievna Qosimova (16 January 1933 – 2 October 2020) was a Tajikistani linguist and academic.

== Biography ==
Born into a family of workers in Konibodom, Qosimova graduated from the Department of History and Philology at Tajikistan State University in 1955; the following year she joined the Communist Party of the Soviet Union. She spent her entire career at her alma mater; from 1959 to 1966 she was a teacher, senior instructor, assistant professor, and professor at the institution. Between 1966 and 1968 she was dean of the Faculty of Philology; she held the post again from 1974 to 1977. She received a doctorate in linguistics in 1981, and became a professor in 1982; in 1986 she became head of the Department of the Tajik Language. This post she held until 1995, when she became Head of the Department of Language and Typography, a post which she held until 2003.

Qosimova's most noted work is the monograph Sintaksi Jumlahoi Soddai Asri Yozdah (The Syntax of Simple Sentences in the Prose Works of the Eleventh Century), published in 1981; other publications include Matni Kelasiki (Classical Text, Dushanbe, 1971); Praktikum az Zaboni Tojiki (Practical Work Based on the Tajiki Language, Dushanbe, 1976); Jumlahoi Payravi Sharti dar Zaboni Adabii Tojik (Conditional Sentences in Literary Tajiki Language, Dushanbe, 1981). Qosimova was named a Distinguished Contributor to Education in Tajikistan in 1967.

A member of the Tajikistan Academy of Sciences, she received numerous awards during her career, among them the Medal "Veteran of Labour" and the Jubilee Medal "In Commemoration of the 100th Anniversary of the Birth of Vladimir Ilyich Lenin".

Qosimova died in Dushanbe on 2 October 2020.
