= Buston, Mastchoh District =

Buston Russian: Бустон Tajik: Бӯстон
- Town and Jamoat
- Location in Tajikistan
- Coordinates: 40°31′18″N 69°19′51″E
- Country: Tajikistan
- Region: Sughd Region
- District: Mastchoh

Population (1 January 2020)
  - Total: 15,500

Buston (Tajik: Бӯстон; Russian: Бустон) is an urban-type settlement and jamoat (municipality) in northern Tajikistan. It is the administrative capital of Mastchoh District in Sughd Region with population of 15,500 (1 January 2020 est.). Farmland, mountain ranges and steep valleys and gorges surround Buston.
