= Kuhandiyor =

Kuhandiyor Tajik: Куҳандиёр
- Jamoat
- Location in Tajikistan
- Coordinates: 40°14′N 70°15′E
- Country: Tajikistan
- Region: Sughd Region
- City: Konibodom

Population (2015)
  - Total: 24,419
- Time zone: UTC+5 (TJT)
- Official languages: Russian (Interethnic); Tajik (State)

Kuhandiyor (formerly Ergash Sharipov; Tajik: Куҳандиёр) is a jamoat in north-western Tajikistan. It is part of the city of Konibodom in Sughd Region. The jamoat has a total population of 24,419 (2015).
