= Yangiyoʻl District =

Coordinates: 41.1182°N 69.0597°E

Yangiyoʻl
- District
- Yangiyoʻl tumani
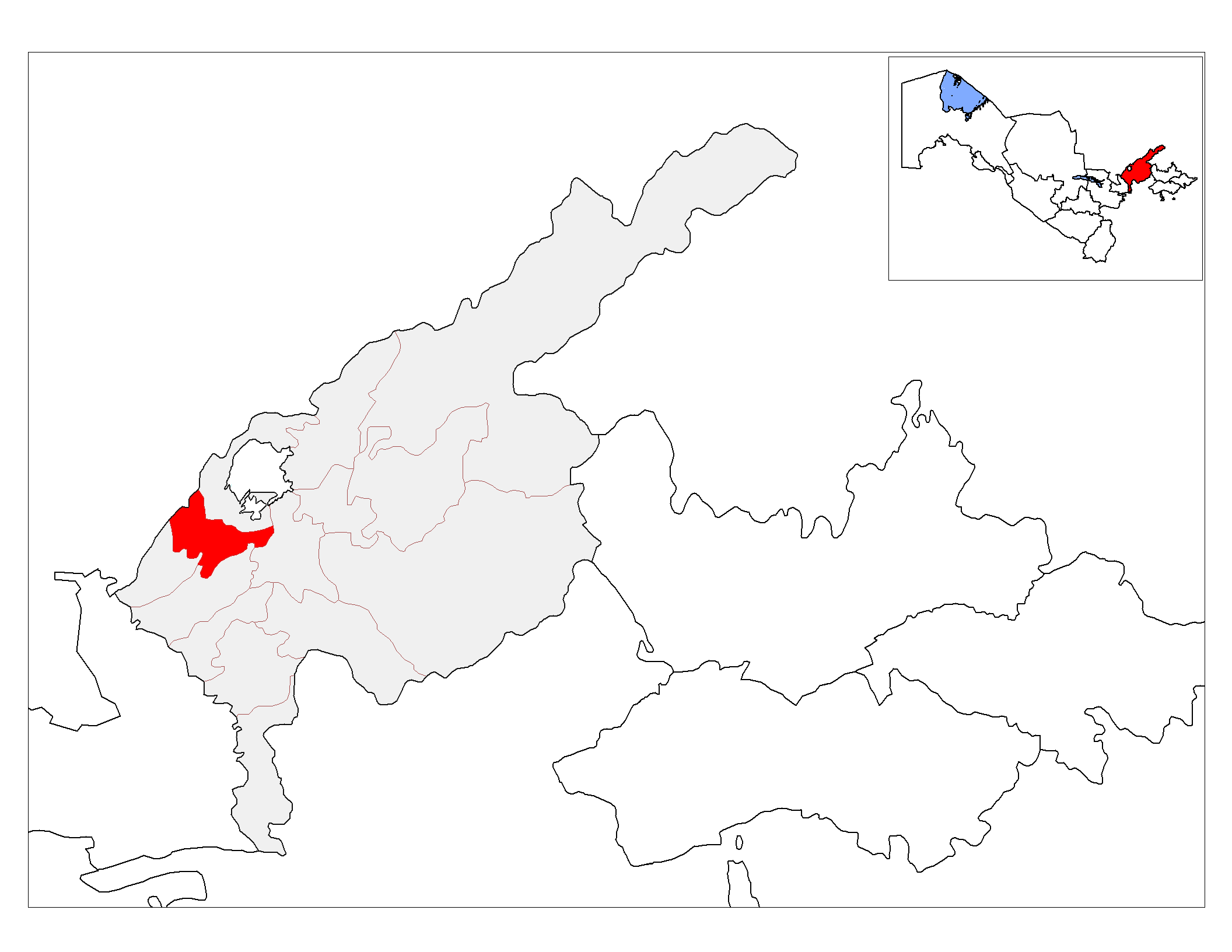
- Country: Uzbekistan
- Region: Tashkent Region
- Capital: Yangiyoʻl
- Established: 1926

Area
  - Total: 420 km^{2} (160 sq mi)

Population (2021)
  - Total: 209,900
  - Density: 500/km^{2} (1,300/sq mi)
- Time zone: UTC+5 (UZT)

Yangiyoʻl is a district of Tashkent Region in Uzbekistan. The capital lies at the city Yangiyoʻl, itself not part of the district. It has an area of 420 km^{2} (160 sq mi) and it had 209,900 inhabitants in 2021. The district consists of 5 urban-type settlements (Gulbahor, Boʻzsuv, Nov, Kirsadoq, Qovunchi) and 8 rural communities (Yoʻgʻontepa, Halqobod, Xonqoʻrgʻon, Navbahor, Niyozbosh, Qoʻsh yogʻoch, Shoʻralisoy, Eski Qovunchi).
