= Chimqal'a =

- Location in Tajikistan
- Coordinates: 39°29′33″N 67°30′29″E
- Country: Tajikistan
- Region: Sughd Region
- City: Panjakent

Chimqal'a (Tajik: Чимқалъа, formerly Chimkurgan) is a village in Sughd Region, northern Tajikistan. It is part of the jamoat Sarazm in the city of Panjakent.
