= Samadobod =

- Location in Tajikistan
- Coordinates: 39°25′46″N 67°30′5″E
- Country: Tajikistan
- Region: Sughd Region
- City: Panjakent
- Official languages: Russian (Interethnic); Tajik (State)

Samadobod (Tajik: Самадобод), formerly Abdusamad (Russian and Tajik: Абдусамад), is a village in Sughd Region, northern Tajikistan. It is part of the jamoat Sarazm in the city of Panjakent.
