= Boʻzsuv =

- urban-type settlement
- Location in Uzbekistan
- Coordinates: 41°07′39″N 68°51′03″E
- Country: Uzbekistan
- Region: Tashkent Region
- District: Yangiyoʻl District
- Urban-type settlement status: 1974

Population (1999)
  - Total: 4,700
- Time zone: UTC+5 (UZT)

Boʻzsuv (Uzbek: Boʻzsuv, Бўзсув or Bozsu / Бозсу) is an urban-type settlement in Tashkent Region, Uzbekistan. It is part of Yangiyoʻl District. The town population in 1989 was 3673 people.
