= Kamar, Tajikistan =

Kamar
- Location in Tajikistan
- Coordinates: 39°29′N 67°30′E
- Country: Tajikistan
- Region: Sughd Region
- City: Panjakent

Kamar (Tajik: Қамар Qamar) is a village in Sughd Region, northern Tajikistan. It is part of the jamoat Sarazm in the city of Panjakent.
