= Navbahor, Sughd =

Navbahor
- Village and Jamoat
- Location in Tajikistan
- Coordinates: 40°39′N 69°26′E
- Country: Tajikistan
- Region: Sughd Region
- District: Mastchoh District

Population
  - Total: 10,373
- Time zone: UTC+5 (TJT)

Navbahor (Tajik: Навбаҳор, formerly: Avzikent) is a village and jamoat in north-western Tajikistan. It is located in Mastchoh District in Sughd Region. The jamoat has a total population of 13,388 (2015).
