= Sa'diniso Hakimova =

Tajikistani obstetrician and gynecologist

Sa'diniso Hafizovna Hakimova (sometimes known as Sofia or Safia Hakimova) (Tajik: Саъдиниссо Ҳафизовна Ҳакимова; December 20, 1924 – October 12, 2015) was a Tajikistani obstetrician and gynecologist.

Hakimova was born in the village of Puledon in Konibodom. In 1943 she graduated from the Tajikistan State Medical Institute, two years later becoming a USSR Distinguished Contributor to Health. For the following year she served as an intern in the regional hospitals of Kulab and Qurghonteppa. In 1946 she began the study of obstetrics and gynecology at the USSR Academy of Medical Sciences in Moscow; in 1950 she defended her thesis, and in 1953 she joined the Communist Party of the Soviet Union. She received her medical degree in 1958, in which year she became leader of a health division in Qurghonteppa. She achieved the title of professor in 1962, and became a corresponding member of the USSR Academy of Medical Sciences in 1969. In 1980 she took the helm of the Department of Obstetrics and Gynecology at the Tajikistan State Medical Institute; she also led the Research Institute for the Well-Being of Mothers and Children. She also founded and directed the Tajik Research Institute of Obstetrics, Gynecology, and Pediatrics.

Hakimova was forced to resign from the Communist Party in April 1990 due to internal pressure. Alarmed by the growing civil war in the country, in 1993 she resigned her post and left Tajikistan. In 1999 she published the book Zalozhniki Imperii (Hostages of the Empire), telling the story of the extermination of Tajiks by the Soviet Union. She later returned to Tajikistan, working to improve the health of women and children in the Rasht Valley.

As a researcher, Hakimova concerned herself with the regularization of function in the endocrine glands during childbirth, especially as it relates to hormonal activities. Other research dealt with the effect of altitude on the development of reproductive organs, and the decrease in the amount of blood in pregnant women. Among her medical publications was Osnovi endokrinologicheskoi ginekologii (Bases for the Scientific Study of Endocrinology in Female Diseases, with Zh. Makin, Moscow, 1966). Recognized as a Distinguished Scientific Contributor of Tajikistan in 1968, she received numerous awards during her career, including the Order of the Badge of Honour, the Honorary Order of the Presidium of the Supreme Soviet of Tajikistan, the Order of Friendship of Peoples, and the Order of the Committee for Keeping the Peace. Hakimova died in Dushanbe.

Hakimova's son, Khakim Dododjanovich Ikramov, later became a mathematician in Moscow and professor at Moscow State University.
