= Hamrabaev =

Hamrabaev Russian: Хамрабаев Tajik: Деҳоти Раҷаб Ҳамробоев
- Jamoat
- Location in Tajikistan
- Coordinates: 40°15′N 70°20′E
- Country: Tajikistan
- Region: Sughd Region
- City: Konibodom

Population (2015)
  - Total: 27,143
- Time zone: UTC+5 (TJT)
- Official languages: Russian (Interethnic); Tajik (State)

Hamrabaev is a jamoat in north-western Tajikistan. It is part of the city of Konibodom in Sughd Region. The jamoat has a total population of 27,143 (2015).
