= Obburdon =

- Village and Jamoat
- Location in Tajikistan
- Coordinates: 40°25′40″N 69°18′17″E
- Country: Tajikistan
- Region: Sughd Region
- District: Mastchoh District

Population (2015)
  - Total: 37,104
- Time zone: UTC+5 (TJT)
- Official languages: Russian (Interethnic); Tajik (State) (Note: Constitution of Tajikistan)

Obburdon is a village and jamoat in north-western Tajikistan. It is located in Mastchoh District in Sughd Region. The jamoat has a total population of 37,104 (2015).
