= Firuzoba =

Firuzoba Tajik: Фирӯзоба
- Jamoat
- Location in Tajikistan
- Coordinates: 40°18′N 70°24′E
- Country: Tajikistan
- Region: Sughd Region
- City: Konibodom

Population (2015)
  - Total: 23,813
- Time zone: UTC+5 (TJT)
- Official languages: Russian (Interethnic); Tajik (State)

Firuzoba (formerly Ghafurjon Ortiqov, Tajik: Firuzoba) is a town and jamoat in north-western Tajikistan. It is part of the city of Konibodom in Sughd Region. The jamoat has a total population of 23,813 (2015).
