= Extreme points of Tajikistan =

This is a list of the extreme points of Tajikistan.

Extreme points of Tajikistan

== Cardinal directions ==
The northernmost region is Sughd Region. The easternmost region is Gorno-Badakhshan Autonomous Region. The country shares a border (Tajikistan–Uzbekistan border) with Uzbekistan in the west and a border (Afghanistan–Tajikistan border) with Afghanistan in the south.

== Elevation ==
At 7,495 m (24,590 ft) above sea level, Ismoil Somoni Peak, formerly called Communism Peak and originally named Stalin Peak, is the highest point of Tajikistan and was the highest point in the USSR.

At 300 m (980 ft) above sea level, the lowest point of Tajikistan is in the Syr Darya (Sirdaryo), a river that flows into the North Aral Sea.

== See also ==
- Geography of Tajikistan
- Extreme points of Asia
