= Oybek =

Oybek is a masculine given name which may refer to:

- Oybek (writer), pen name of Uzbek poet and writer Musa Tashmukhamedov (1905–1968)
- Oybek Abdugafforov (born 1995), Tajikistani footballer
- Oybek Bozorov (born 1997), Uzbekistani footballer
- Oybek Kasimov (born 1980), Uzbekistsani government official
- Oybek Kilichev (born 1989), Uzbekistani footballer
- Oybek Mamazulunov (fl. 2013), Uzbekistani boxer
- Oybek Tursunov, Uzbek entrepreneur and government official
- Oybek Usmankhojaev (born 1978), Uzbekistani former footballer

== See also ==
- Aybek (disambiguation)
