= Aybek Orozaliyev =

Kyrgyzstani footballer

Personal information
- Full name: Aybek Bekshakirovich Orozalyyev
- Position: Left-back

International career^{‡}
Years	Team	Apps	(Gls)
2001–2003	Kyrgyzstan	0	(0)
- ‡ National team caps and goals as of 28 December 2003

Aybek Orozaliyev is a retired Kyrgyzstani footballer who is a midfield. He last played for Algatuban Ashjkhak. He was a member of the Kyrgyzstan national football team.
