= Tajikistan–Uzbekistan border minefields =

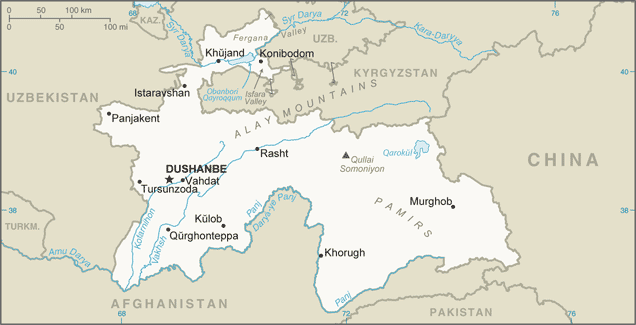
Map showing Tajikistan with Uzbekistan located in the West

The Uzbekistan–Tajikistan border minefields are the result of Uzbekistan's unilateral decision to indiscriminately mine rural areas along its border region with Tajikistan. This action is aimed at hindering drug trafficking and cross-border infiltrations of terrorists of the Islamic Movement of Uzbekistan, but the mines have caused many civilian casualties. Uzbekistan asserted that it is placing mines in its territory, but so far not all the boundaries between Uzbekistan and Tajikistan have been delineated. By 2004 Tajikistan and Uzbekistan had settled almost 86% of their 1,283-km border dispute following the collapse of the Soviet Union in 1991. In 2018, the new Uzbekistan President Shavkat Mirziyoyev promised in an agreement with Tajikistan to de-mine the border. As of January 2020, reports emerged in Tajik media claiming that the de-mining was completed on the border.

== Opinions on the minefields ==
- International Committee of the Red Cross – The former head of the International Committee of the Red Cross in Tajikistan, George Gunz, said "Any government taking such steps must inform the population of mine locations and types of mines." He said that all international humanitarian norms were being violated so long as the mine locations were not marked, posing a constant threat to the lives of civilians living in border areas. Gunz said that such incidents would continue until governments agreed to sign the Ottawa Convention prohibiting the use of antipersonnel mines.
- Uzbekistan's defence minister, Qodyr Pulatov, has defended his country's actions: "All mines laid have been marked with special plates warning of danger," (an assertion Tajik authorities in Dushanbe dismiss after recent official missions to the area failed to locate any such notices).

== See also ==
- Tajikistan–Uzbekistan relations
- Tajikistan–Uzbekistan border
