= Sarazm =

Tajikistan district and Bronze Age site

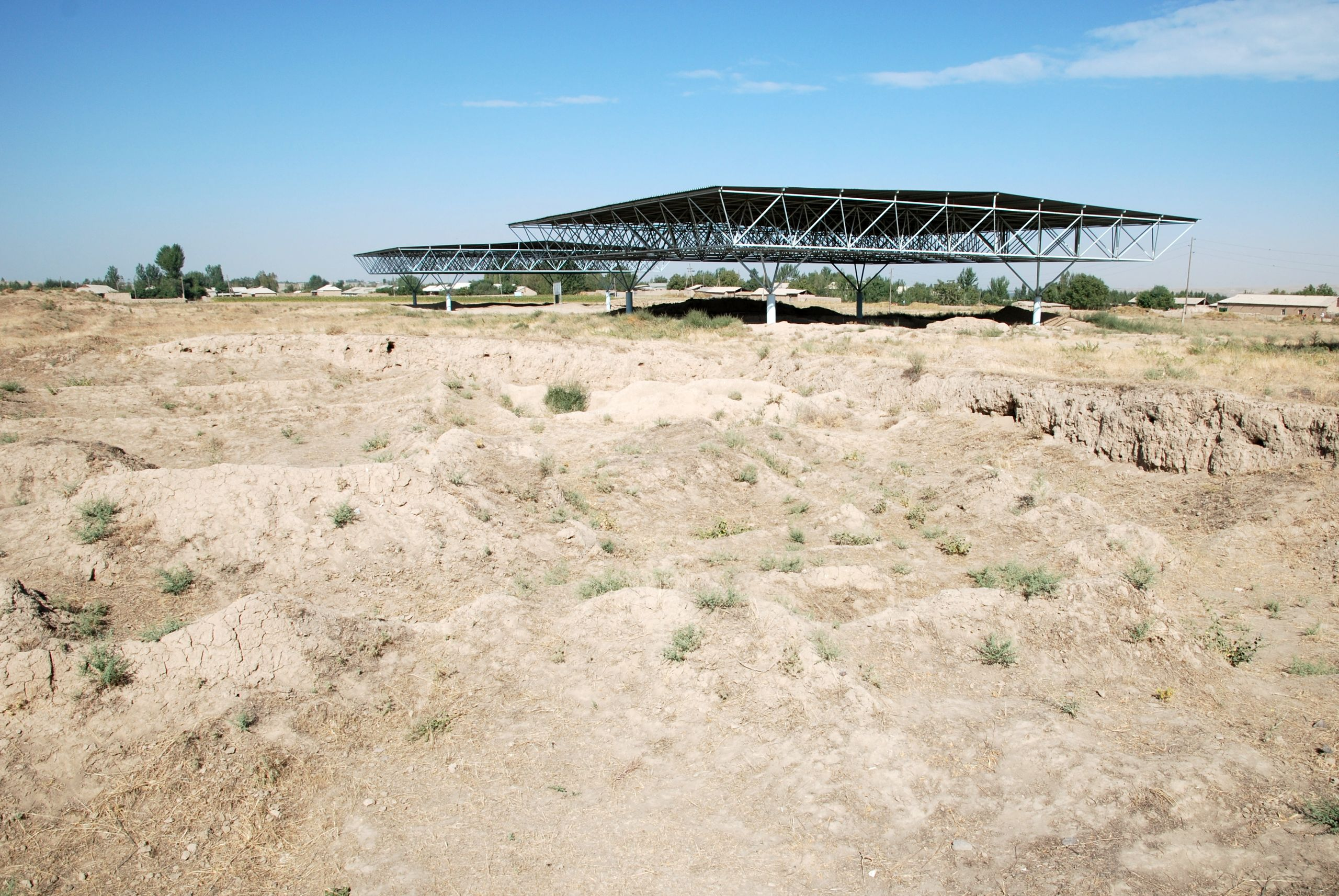
- Sarazm

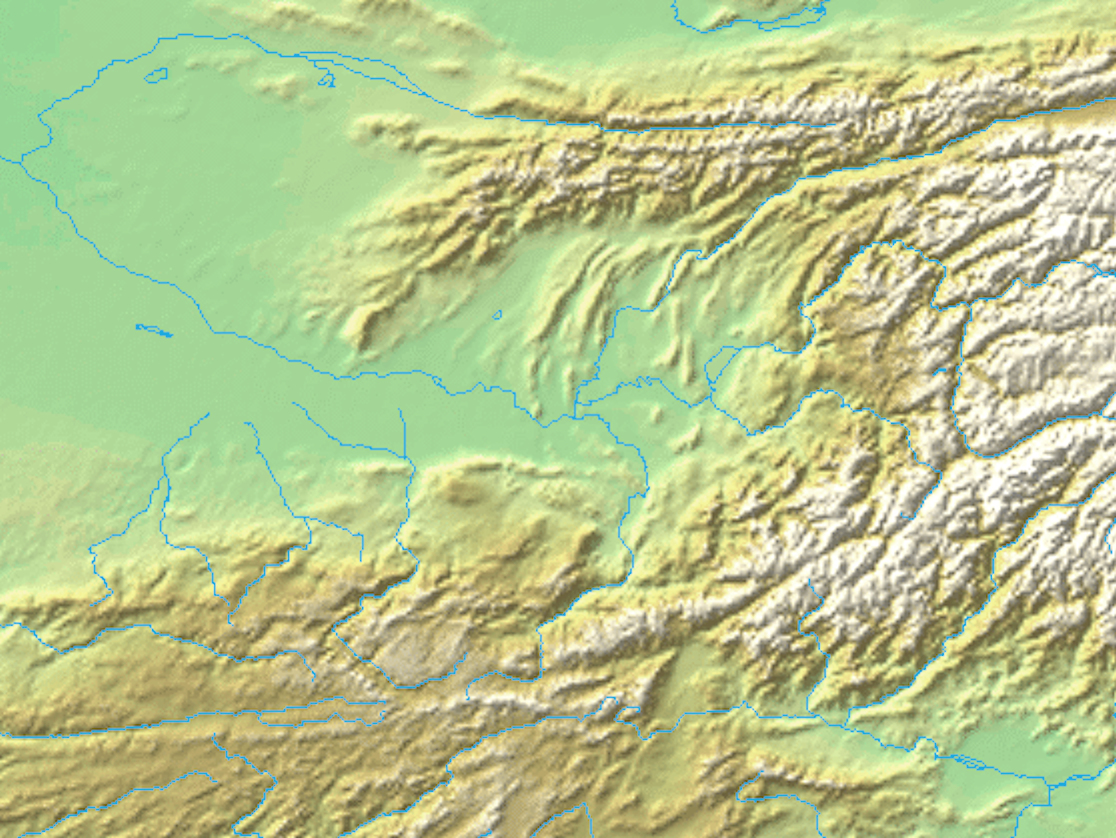
- Location of the site in Tajikistan Sarazm (Bactria) Sarazm (Tajikistan)
- 39°30′30″N 67°27′40″E
- Type: Settlement
- Location: Sughd Region, Tajikistan
- Region: Zarafshan Valley

Site notes
- Archaeologists: A. Isakov, R. Besenval, B. Lyonnet

UNESCO World Heritage Site
- Official name: Proto-urban Site of Sarazm
- Type: Cultural
- Criteria: ii, iii
- Designated: 2010 (34th session)
- Reference no.: 1141rev
- Region: Asia-Pacific

Sarazm (Tajik: Саразм) is a town and also a jamoat in the city of Panjakent in Sughd Region, north-western Tajikistan. It dates back to the 4th millennium BC, with C14 dates ranging from 3900 to 2100 BC, and was named a World Heritage Site by UNESCO. The jamoat is part of and has a total population of 27,877 (2015). It consists of 21 villages, including Chimqal'a (the seat), Abdusamad, Bostondeh, Kamar, Kamar-Tash and Sohibnazar.

The archaeological site of the ancient city of Sarazm is near Sohibnazar, a village on the left bank of the river Zeravshan, near the border with Uzbekistan. The culture of Sarazm precedes the arrival of the Andronovo steppe culture in South Central Asia in the 2nd millennium BC.

== Archeology ==
Located 15 kilometers west of the city of Panjakent, the site occupies an area of about 1.5 km in length and 400 to 900m in width. At the peak of the occupation, the site would have covered an area of up to 90 hectares, 35 of which are unobstructed.

The site is of great interest for archaeologists as it constitutes the first proto-historical agricultural society in this region of Central Asia. Moreover, it is the most north-eastern of those proto-historical agricultural permanent settlements. Sarazm was the first city in Central Asia to maintain economic relations with a network of settlements covering a vast territory from the Turkmenistan steppes and the Aral sea (in the northwest) to the Iranian Plateau and the Indus (in the south and southeast).

=== Discovery and excavations ===
Following surface discoveries unearthed due to agricultural activity, the first excavation of the site started in 1977 and was conducted by Abdullah Isakov of the Academy of Science of Tajikistan. During that first excavation, eight soundings in the different locations were conducted and three areas were excavated. In 1987, seven areas were excavated and twenty soundings had been conducted.

==== International cooperation ====
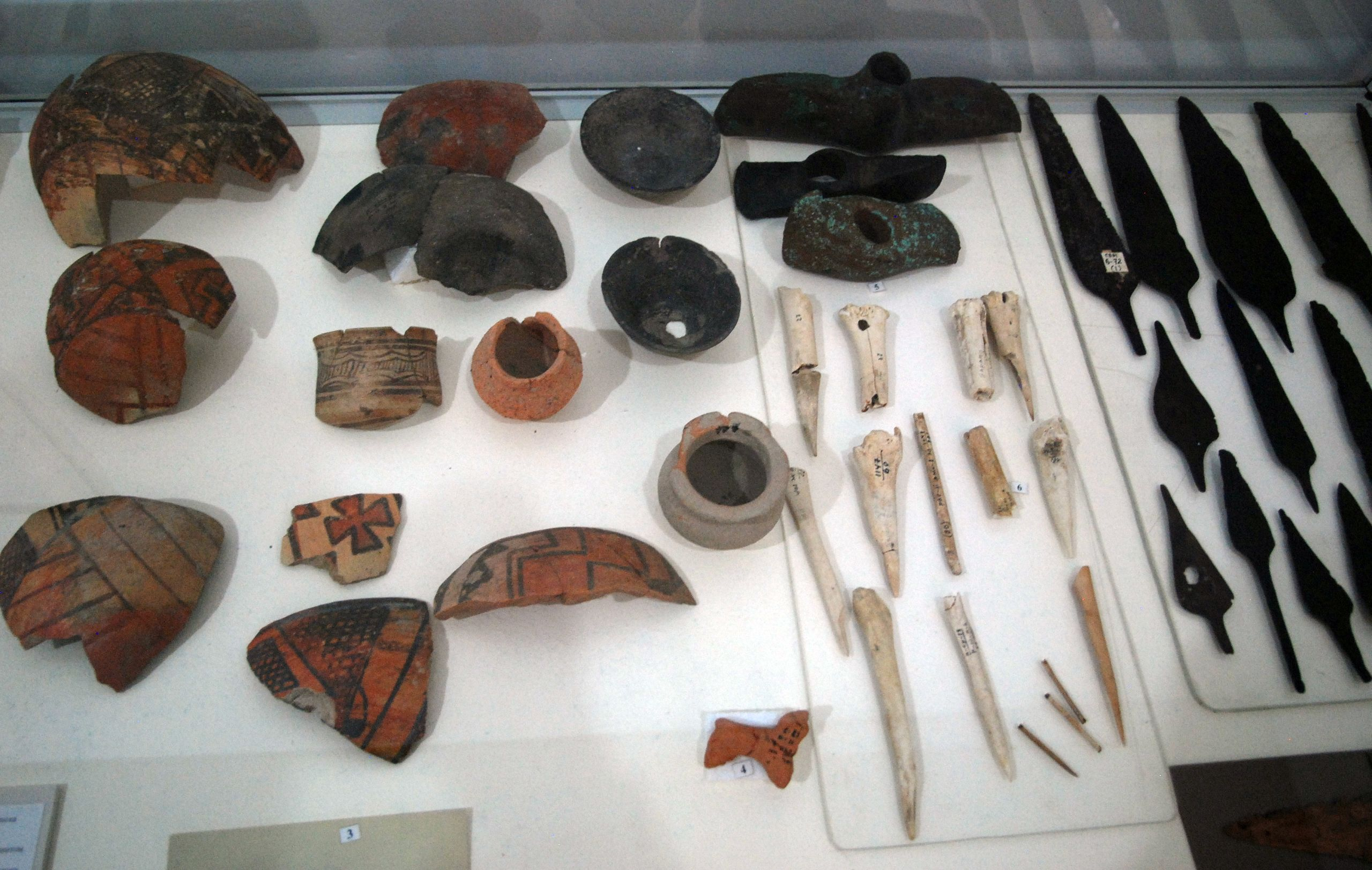
Artifacts excavated in Sarazm

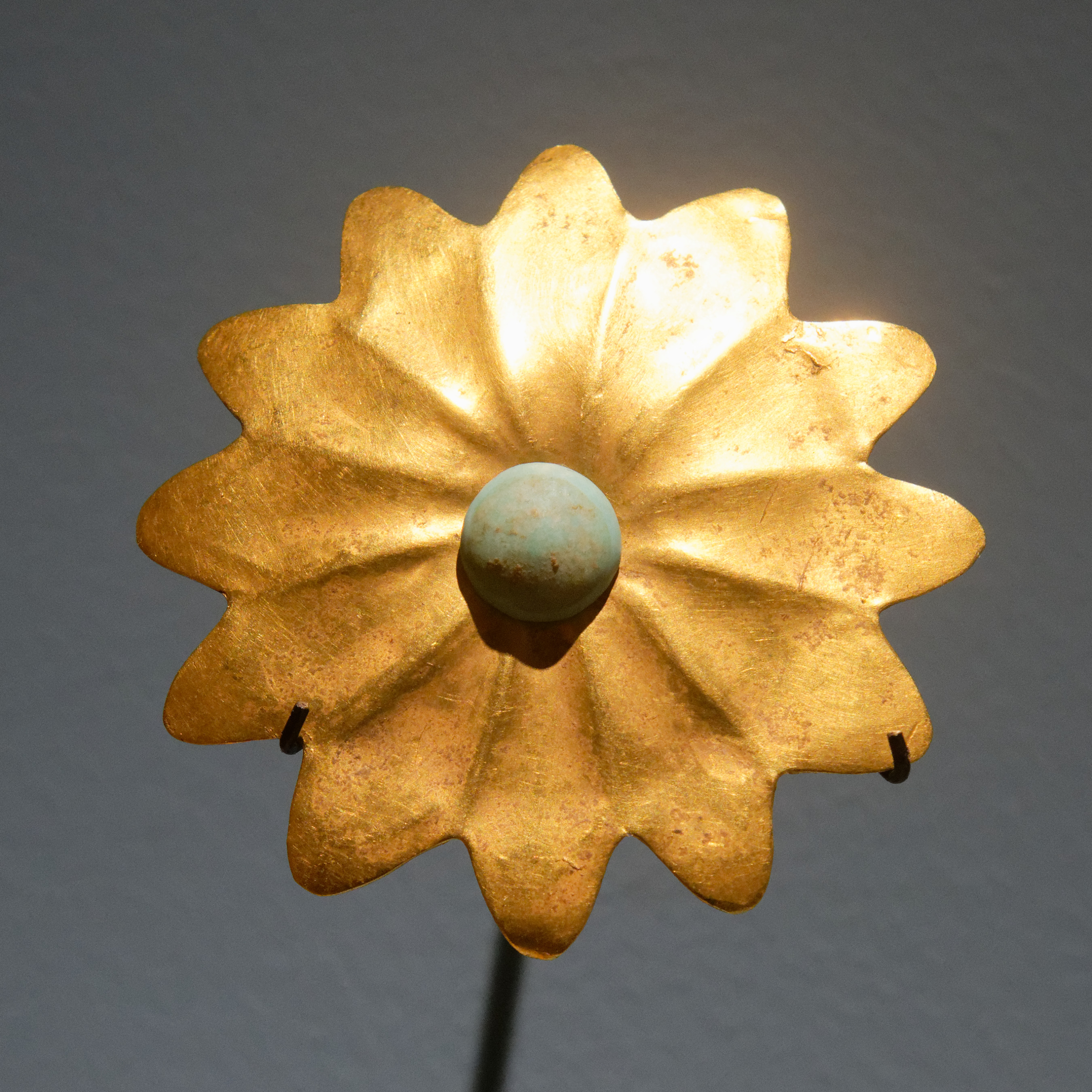
12-petalled flower from Sarazm's cult structure early 3rd millennium BCE

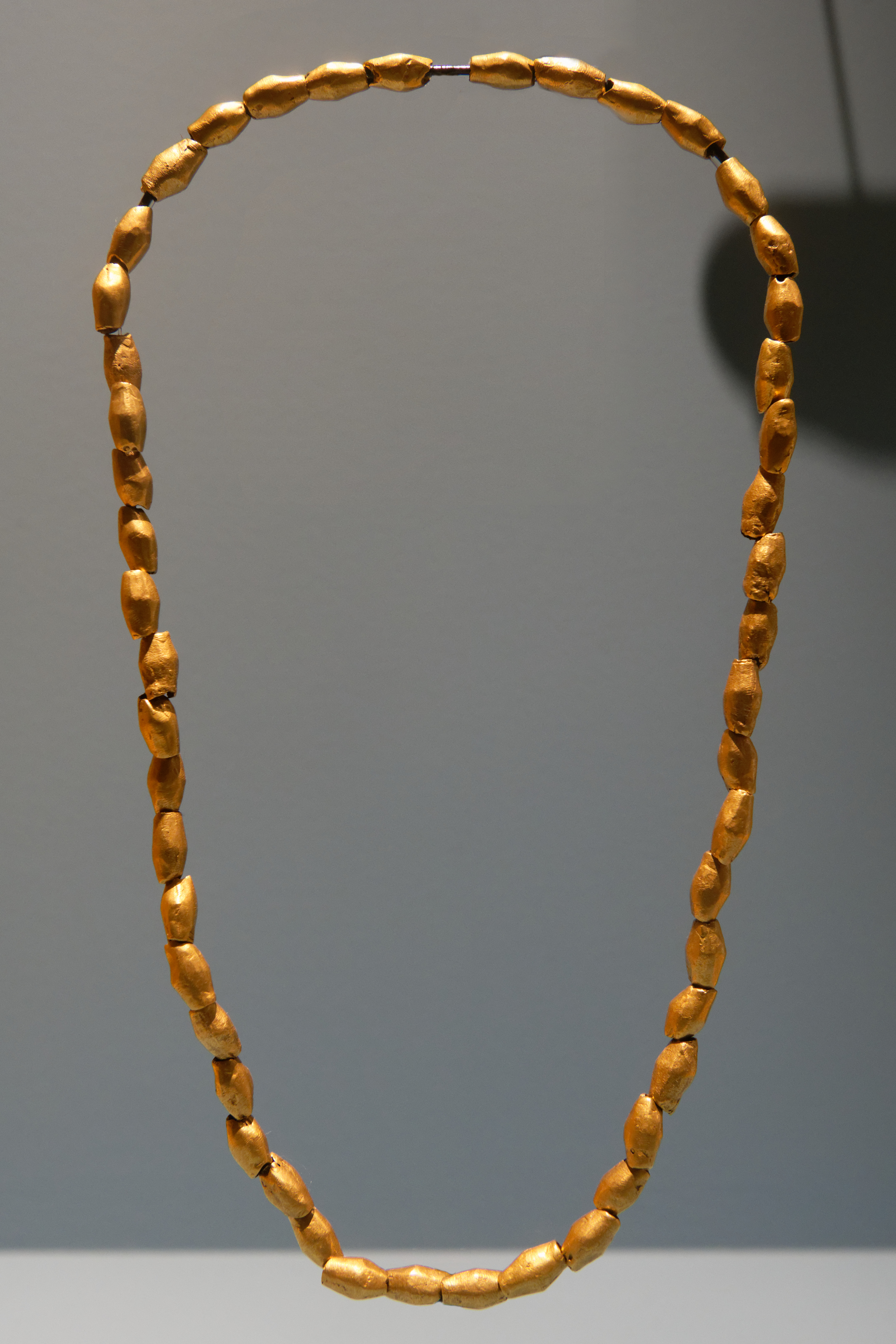
Bead necklace from the tomb of the "Sarazm princess", middle 4th millennium BCE

The site was researched through multiple partnership between the Tajik SSR and international partners. Most notably, a fruitful collaboration between French and Tajik researchers flourished starting in 1984 with a first scientific mission. In 1985, a cooperation agreement was signed between the Centre national de la recherche scientifique (CNRS) and the Tajik Academy of Science for three years, a partnership that would be renewed until 1998, when the French mission changed towards supporting the preservation of the site. Most archeometric analysis were conducted by the CNRS in France. The French mission was supervised by R. Besenval, R. Lyonnet (ceramology) and F. Cesbron (mineralogy).

In 1985, two American professors, P.L. Kohl (Wellesley College) and C.C. Lamberg-Karlovsky (Harvard) took part in an expedition organised as a joint USSR and US archeological exchange program.

==== Stratigraphy dates ====
The site is composed of four distinct layers of occupation separated by long period of abandonment. This classification was established during the first excavations. There are about 1.5 to 2 meters of deposits in total for about a millennium of occupation and not all four layers are found in every location, suggesting the settlement moved over the centuries. The different layers are numbered Sarazm I, II, III, IV, with Sarazm I being the most ancient layer.

Dating of the layers is uncertain, although most agree on the first half of the 4th millennium BC as the beginning of the occupation. Dates have been established initially through radiocarbon dating.

Here are the date results as recalibrated in 1985 by the American-USSR mission, using the results from the Leningrad laboratory.

Sarazm Radiocarbon Dating
| Layer | Excavation | Dating (BP) | Dating (Recalibrated) |
|---|---|---|---|
| Sarazm I | 4 | LE-2172:5050±60 BP | cal 3907-3775 BC (1σ) |
| Sarazm I | 4 | LE-2173:4880±30 BP | cal 3790-3645 BC (1σ) |
| Sarazm I | 2 | LE-2174:4940±30 BP | cal 3870-3660 BC (1σ) |
| Sarazm II | 3 | LE-1806:4460±50 BP | cal 3365-3020 BC (1σ) |
| Sarazm II | 3 | LE-1808:4230±40 BP | cal 2970-2795 BC (1σ) |
| Sarazm III | 2 | LE-1807:3840±40 BP | cal 2415-2185 BC (1σ) |
| Sarazm III | 3 | LE-1420:3790±80 BP | cal 2410-2115 BC (1σ) |

The excavation VII, which was conducted by the French mission also produced some radiocarbon dating of this site.

Excavation VII Radiocarbon Dating
| Layer | Dating (BP) | Dating (calibrated) |
|---|---|---|
| Sarazm I | 4450±60 BP | cal 3350-2937 BC (2σ) |
| Sarazm I | 4380±70 BP | cal 3330-2890 BC (2σ) |
| Sarazm II | 4130±70 BP | cal 2910-2494 BC (2σ) |
| Sarazm III | 3990±70 BP | cal 2863-2330 BC (2σ) |
| Sarazm IV | 3850±90 BP | cal 2580-2044 BC (2σ) |
| Sarazm IV | 3800±70 BP | cal 2470-2040 BC (2σ) |

Timelines were also confirmed through the cultural artefacts belonging to others cultures who had already been investigated. For instance the presence of Turkmen clay shards from the Namazga II and III period and Togau ceramics from Baluchistan can attest of occupation from the first half of the fourth millennium to the second half of the third millennium BC.

=== Economy ===
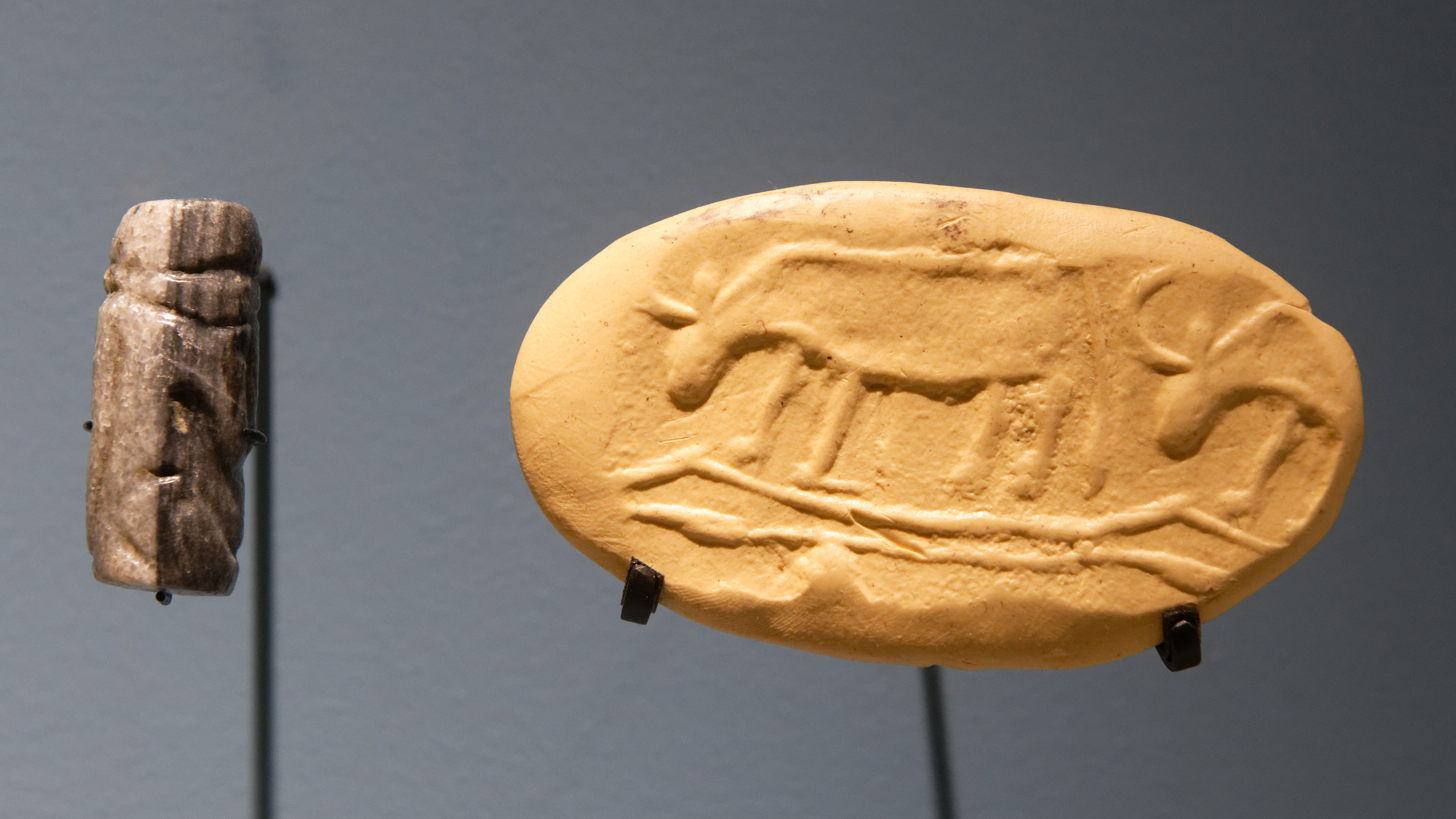
Cylinder seal, Sarazm, late 4th millennium BCE

Following the first excavation, Isakov said that "It has been clearly established that the inhabitants of Sarazm were occupied not only with agriculture and herding but also with metallurgical production". A large metal repertoire has been unearthed from the II, III and IV layers: daggers, awls, chisels, axes and decorative pieces were among the discoveries. There is ample evidence that the metal was actually worked in Sarazm using techniques similar to those used in Mesopotamia, the Iranian Plateau and the Indus Valley.

Some have said that around 3000 BC, it was the largest exporting metallurgical center of Central Asia.

The ceramics discovered at Sarazm indicate contacts extending to the Iranian Plateau, Northern Baluchistan and Turkmenistan. For example, pottery from the Bronze Age north-eastern Iranian culture, from Seistan and Baluchistan have been found.

The agriculture was also facilitated by the construction of irrigation facilities that allowed the inhabitants to use the water from the Zerafshan river and capture the water from the mountains as well. Wheat (free-threshing hexaploid) and barley (both naked and hulled) were discovered at the site, while evidence for broomcorn millet and pulses were not found. The naked barley found at Sarazm is similar in morphology to the barley found in sites in Pakistan such as Mehrgarh and Nausharo, and also similar to the barley found in the earliest sites in China where barley was first found. The inhabitants were also involved in herding of mainly cattle, sheep and goat. The herding was oriented towards the maximisation of the secondary products (milk, wool, leather).

The Sarazm III period corresponds to the peak of Sarazm's economy as the population had grown, building techniques improved and various economic activities such as pottery (using the newly invented slow rotating wheel) and more specialisation in metallurgy and other crafts.

The city is believed to have been revived as a mining point to collect from nearby sources of turquoise. Moreover, the Zerafshan valley is rich in minerals: gold, silver, galena, copper, tin and mercury. The town would have been involved in the mining and transformation of local resources.

=== Architecture ===
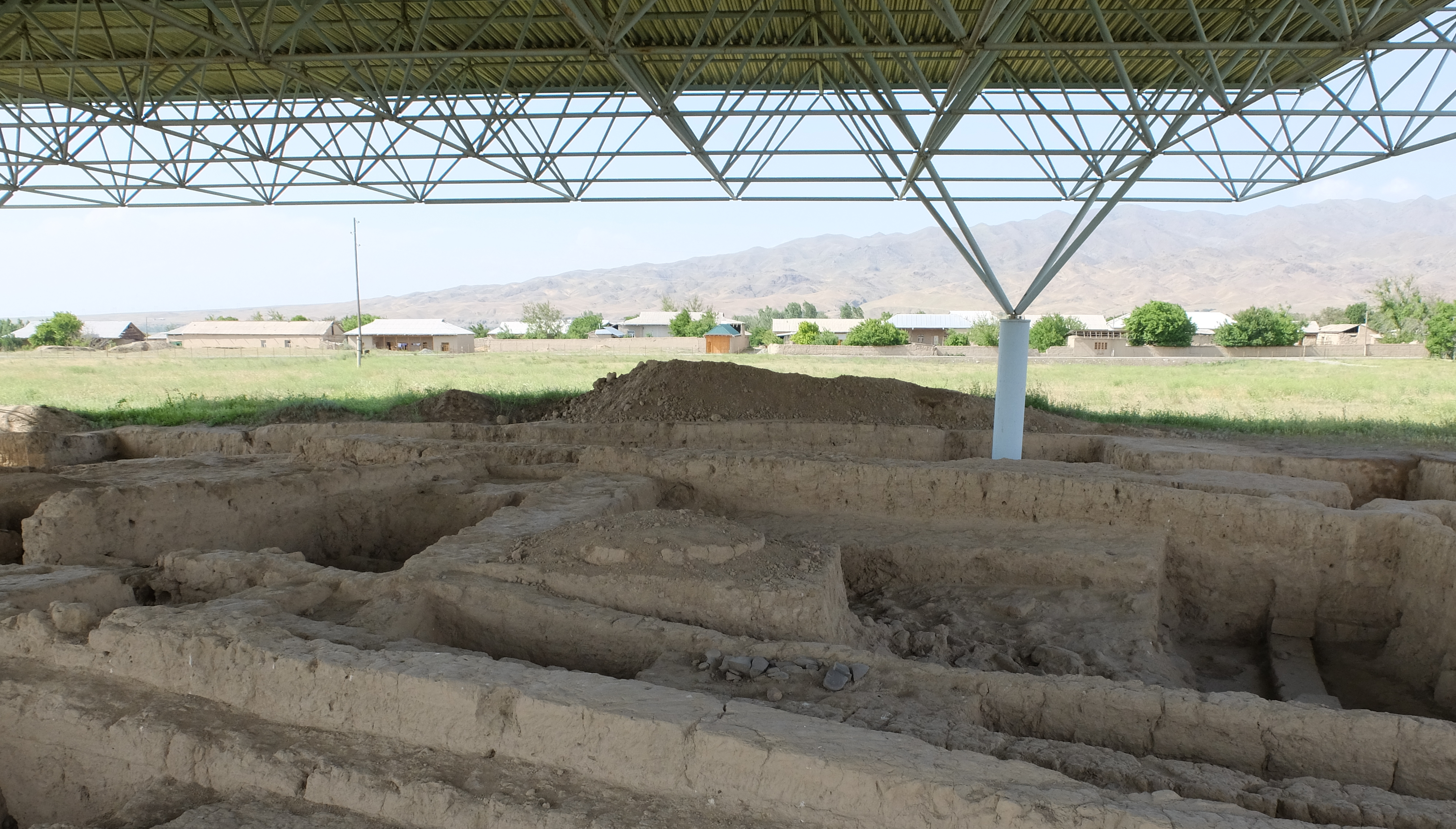
Raw earth architecture in Sarazm.

Among the many structures that were excavated, the majority appear to be multi-rooms habitations, but some seem to have a different purpose and serve as communal buildings. Those buildings seem to be well thought out with clear plans, regular bricks with walls that are sometimes covered in coloured coating; however, their functions remain unclear. Two main building techniques are present on the site: raw earth brick (moulded and dried under the sun) and hand-shaped earth construction.

Sarazm I architecture was badly damaged by the subsequent layer; therefore, it has not been studied thoroughly. The buildings from the second period show the presence of passages of 50-60 centimeters by 20–25 cm linking the building of a complex together and allowing for access to a courtyard where bread ovens were also found. The floors during the Sarazm III period were usually burned. Some buildings also presented large hearths, and it was theorised based on observation of similar hearths in Turkmenistan that these buildings might have served as cult areas.

Fortifications were also discovered in the excavation II.

=== Burial sites ===
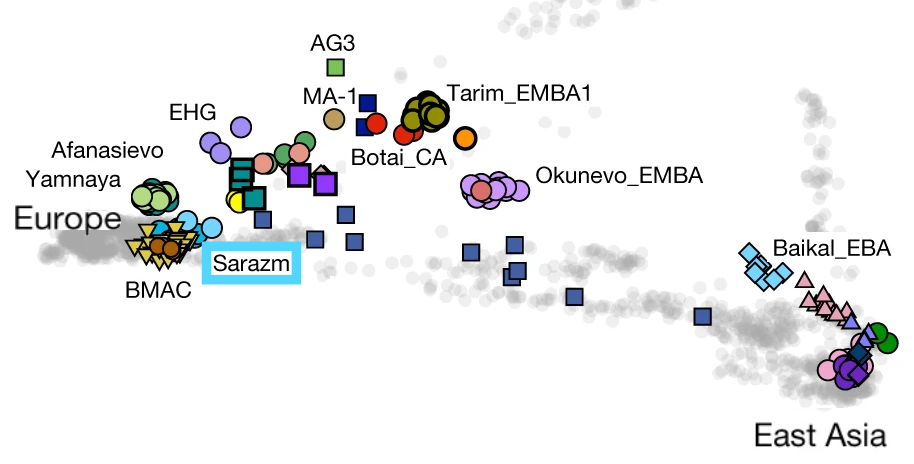
Genetic proximity of the Sarazm Early Neolithic remains, with ancient (color) and modern (grey) populations. Primary Component Analysis (detail).

The Sarazm culture, with contemporary polities and cultures c. 3000 BCE.

Burial sites were in the shape of a large circle of 15-meter diameter surrounded by a wall. In some of the burial chambers, valuables objects such as pottery and beads have been found. A large necropolis has yet to be discovered.

Following the analysis of the remains, the anthropologist Khodzhaiov has concluded that the people of Sarazm originated in southern part of Central and Southwest Asia and are genetically related to the population of other Eneolithic sites in Turkmenistan (Göksur and Qara-depe).

=== Culture and art ===
At the peak of the occupation of Sarazm, the city was economically thriving and artistic production flourished. Pottery was richly ornamented with motifs such as circles, crosses, triangles, lines and net pattern painted using red, yellow and blue pigments. The rosette patterns found on some ceramic could be indicative of an understanding of the solar calendar.

Terracotta statuettes of women and animals with magical powers were also found as sculptural figures emerged as an important artistic trend.

The religious beliefs of the Sarazm people are unclear, but we know that they had altars where sacred fires burned.

Sarazm seems to be connected to the Göksür culture through its east-ward migration in the region.

== World Heritage Site status ==
The proto-urban site of Sarazm was inscribed on the World Heritage List in July 2010 as "an archaeological site bearing testimony to the development of human settlements in Central Asia, from the 4th millennium BCE to the end of the 3rd millennium BCE". It is the first World Heritage Site in Tajikistan.

To protect the archaeological site, some areas have been covered by a metal roof while others have been reburied under soil. With the help of local people and the CRATerre research institute, a protective coating of rice husk and stabilised earth has been designed to cover fragile previously uncovered areas.

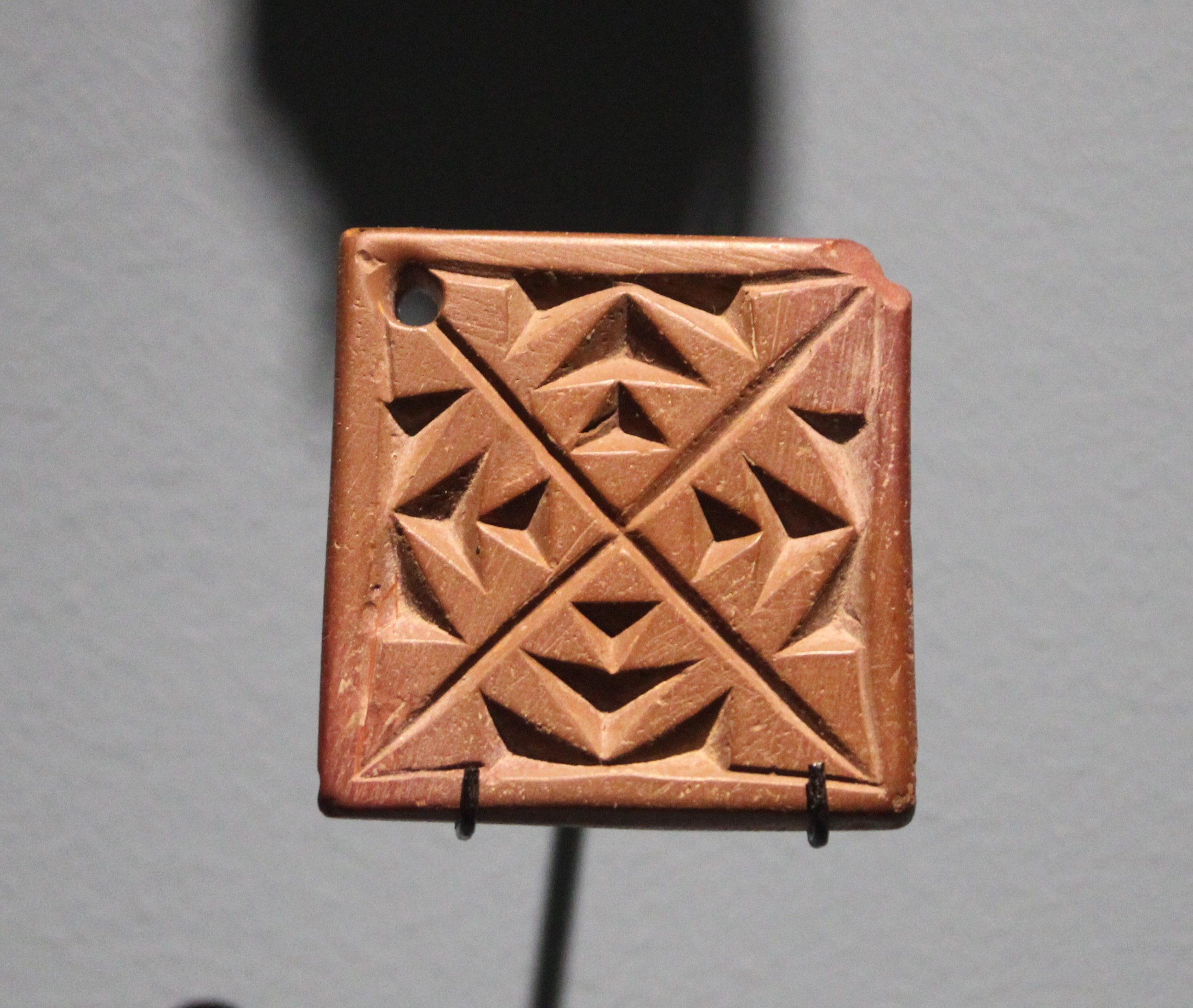
Stone seal, mid-2nd millennium BC.

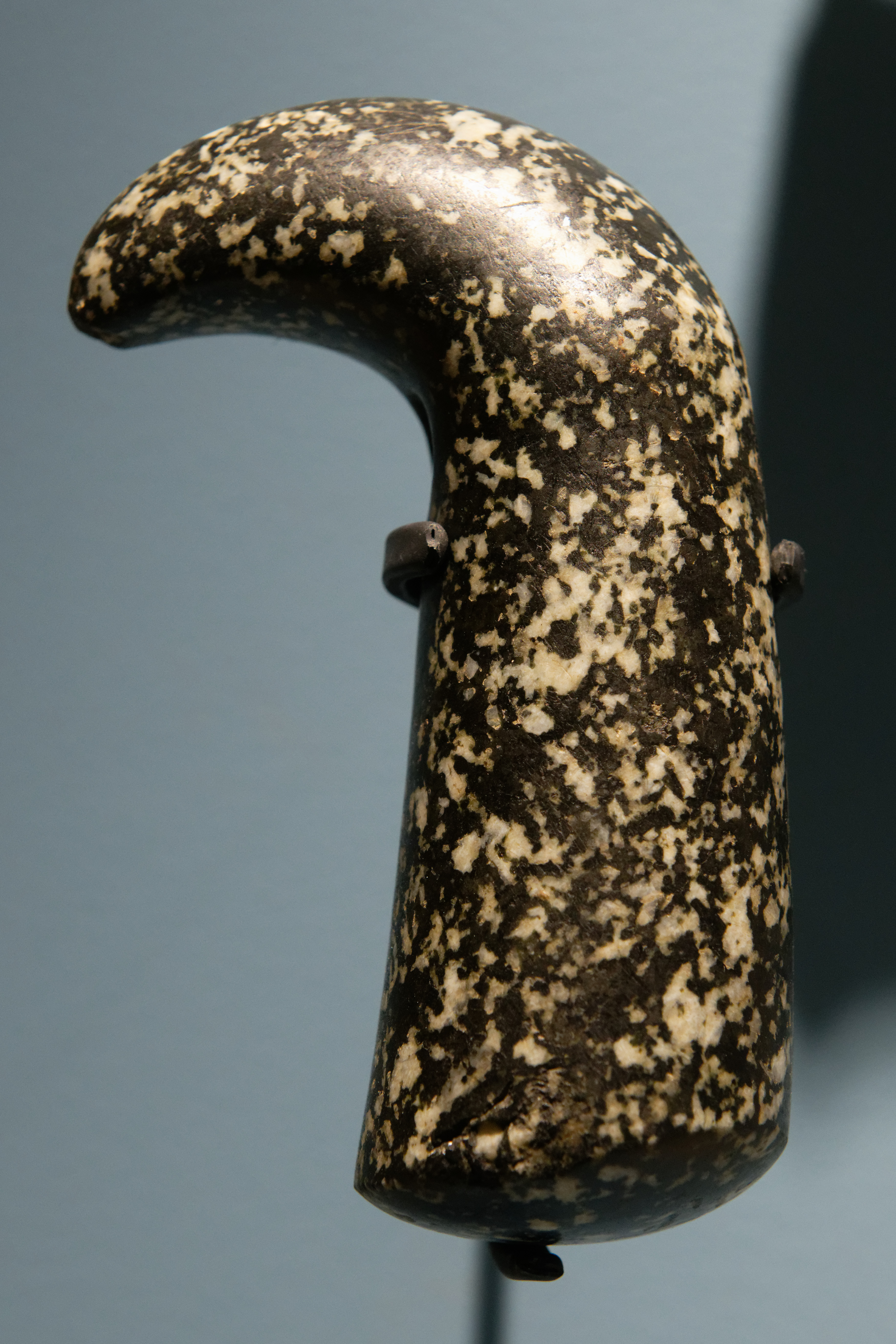
Sceptre, second half of the 3rd millennium BC.

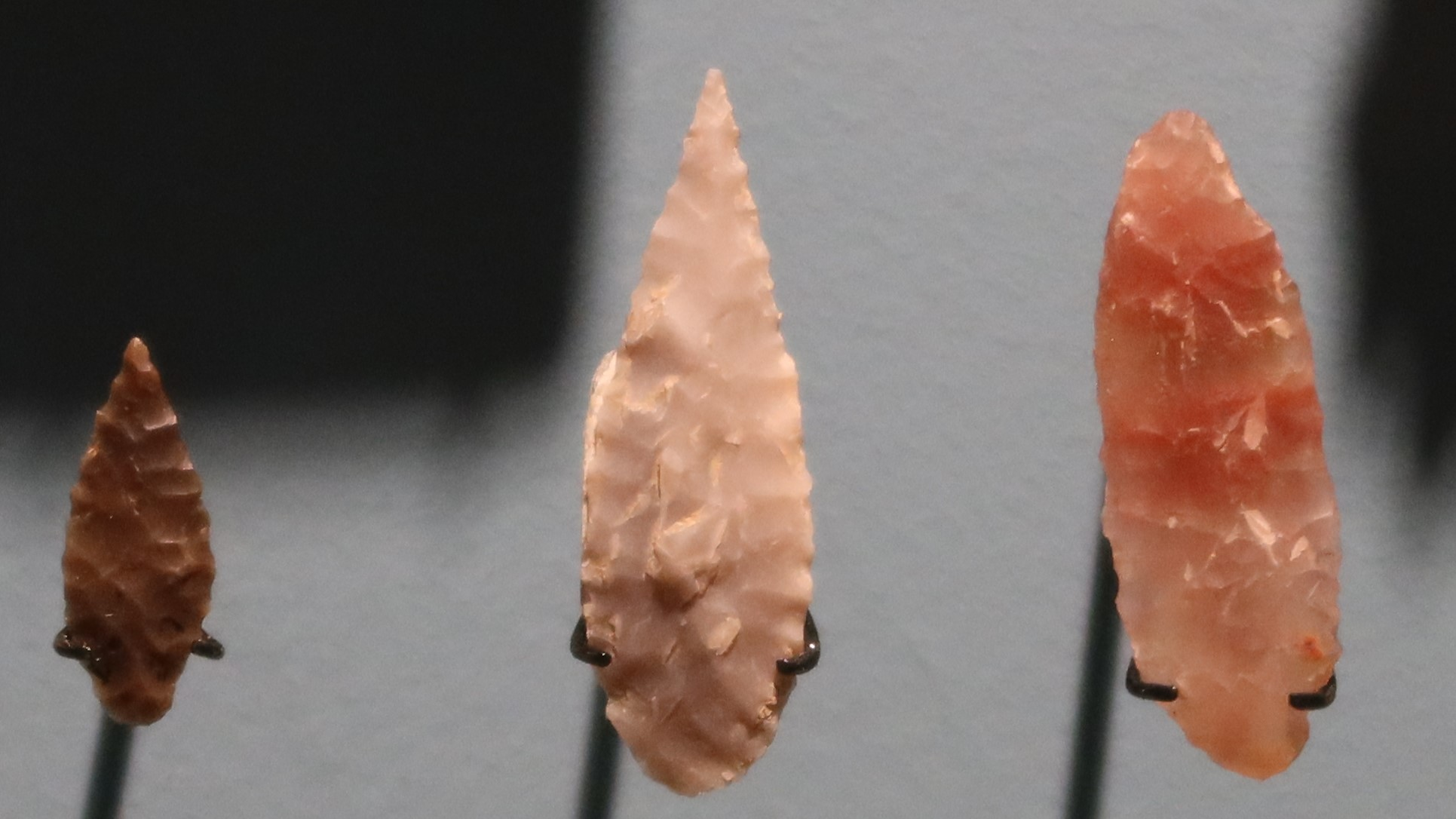
Arrow points, 4-3rd millennium BC

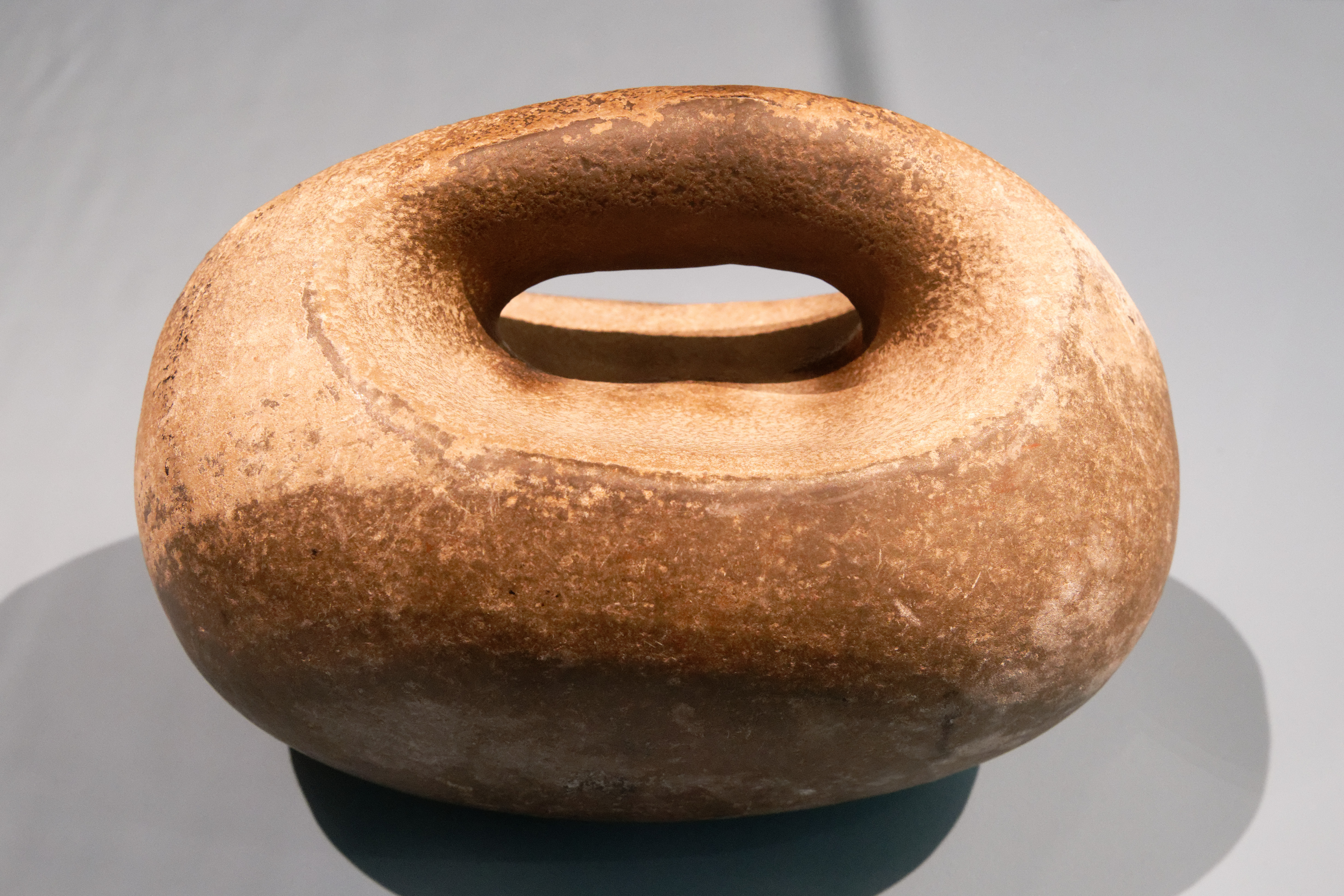
Handled stone or weight, 4th–3rd millennia BC.

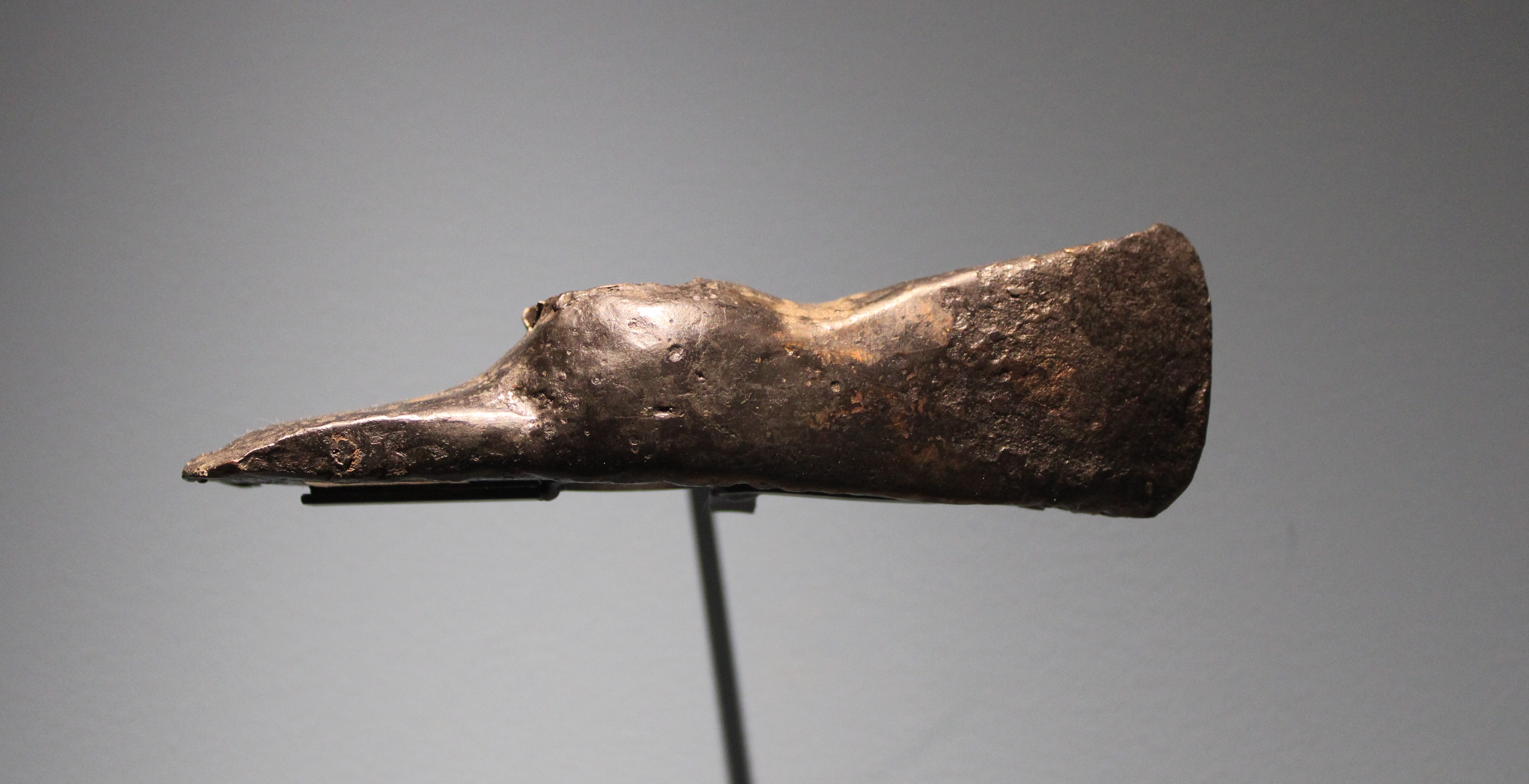
Bronze axe head, second half of the 3rd millennium BC.
