= Obshoron =

- Location in Tajikistan
- Coordinates: 40°34′43″N 69°22′40″E
- Country: Tajikistan
- Region: Sughd Region
- District: Mastchoh District

Population (2020)
  - Total: 3,400
- Official languages: Russian (Interethnic); Tajik (State) (Note: Constitution of Tajikistan)

Obshoron (Russian and Tajik: Обшорон, formerly: Quruqsoy) is a town in north-western Tajikistan. It is located in Mastchoh District, Sughd Region.
