= Gulbahor =

- Urban-type settlement
- Location in Uzbekistan
- Coordinates: 41°04′29″N 69°01′39″E
- Country: Uzbekistan
- Region: Tashkent Region
- District: Yangiyoʻl District
- Urban-type settlement: 1943

Population (2002)
  - Total: 12,100
- Time zone: UTC+5 (UZT)

Gulbahor (Uzbek: Gulbahor/Гулбаҳор, Russian: Гульбахор) is an urban-type settlement in Tashkent Region, Uzbekistan. It is part of Yangiyoʻl District. The town population in 1989 was 9,814 people.
