= Pulatan =

Pulatan Russian: Пулодон Tajik: Пӯлодон
- Town and Jamoat
- Interactive map of Pulatan
- Coordinates: 40°18′N 70°27′E
- Country: Tajikistan
- Region: Sughd Region
- City: Konibodom

Population
  - Total: 26,031
- Time zone: UTC+5 (TJT)
- Official languages: Russian (Interethnic); Tajik (State)

Pulatan (Russian: Пулодон; Tajik: Пӯлодон) is a village and jamoat in north-western Tajikistan. It is part of the city of Konibodom in Sughd Region. The jamoat has a total population of 26,031.
