= Punuk =

Punuk Пунук (Russian and Tajik)
- Village and jamoat
- Location in Tajikistan
- Coordinates: 40°52′N 70°22′E
- Country: Tajikistan
- Region: Sughd Region
- District: Asht District

Population (2015)
  - Total: 8,841
- Time zone: UTC+5 (TJT)
- Official languages: Russian (Interethnic); Tajik (State) (Note: Constitution of Tajikistan)

Punuk (Russian: Пунук) is a village and jamoat in north-west Tajikistan. It is located in Asht District in Sughd Region. As of 2015, the jamoat had a total population of 8,841.
