= Mastchoh =

- Village and Jamoat
- Location in Tajikistan
- Coordinates: 40°22′N 69°20′E
- Country: Tajikistan
- Region: Sughd Region
- District: Mastchoh District

Population
  - Total: 16,401
- Time zone: UTC+5 (TJT)

Mastchoh is a village and jamoat in north-western Tajikistan. It is located in Mastchoh District in Sughd Region. The jamoat has a total population of 21,929 (2015).
