= Konibodom =

Konibodom Russian: Канибадам Tajik: Конибодом
- City
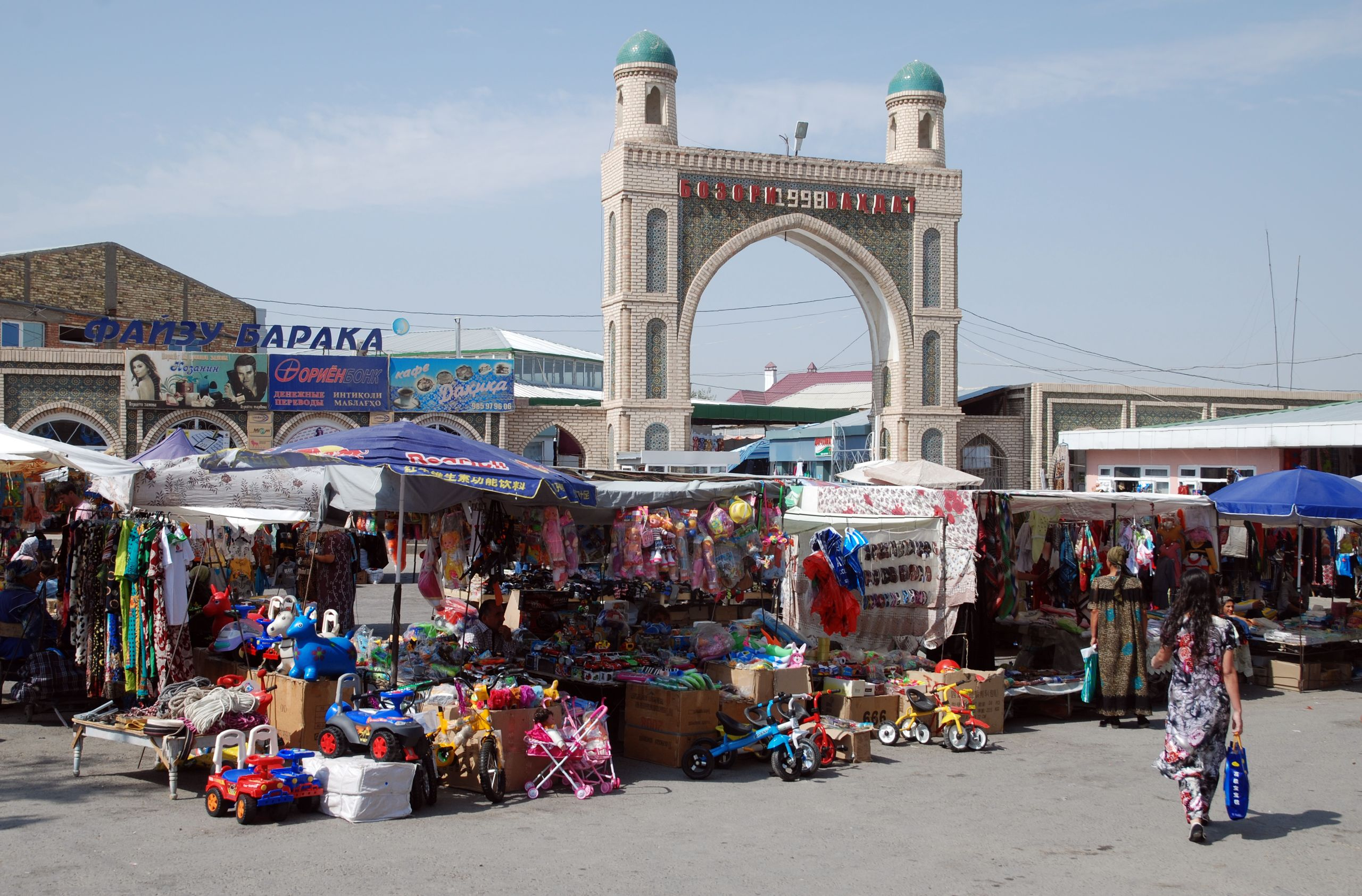
- Konibodom, the bazar.

- Location in Tajikistan
- Coordinates: 40°17′24″N 70°25′37″E
- Country: Tajikistan
- Region: Sughd Region
- Founded: 7th century

Government
  - Chief: Shamsiddinov Hiloliddin

Area
  - City: 829 km^{2} (320 sq mi)
  - Land: 67 km^{2} (26 sq mi)
- Elevation: 410 m (1,350 ft)

Population (2022 est.)
  - City: 54,400
  - Urban: 219,000
- Time zone: UTC+5
- Postal code: 735900
- Official languages: Russian (Interethnic); Tajik (State)
- Website: www.konibodom.tj

Konibodom (Tajik: Конибодом, lit. 'almond mine'; Russian: Канибадам) is a city in the Sughd Region of northern Tajikistan, in western Fergana Valley. It has a population of 54,400 (2022 est.).

== Etymology ==
The city was mentioned in Sogdian documents recovered from the Qal'a-yi Mugh archaeological site under the name Kand, and was later mentioned in the Baburnama and Habib al-Siyar under the name Kand-i Bādām (Persian: کند بادام, lit. 'almond city'). It was first mentioned under its modern name, Kān-i Bādām (Persian: کان بادام, lit. 'almond mine'), in the historical works of Khanate of Kokand.

== Geography ==
=== Climate ===
Konibodom has a hot, dry-summer continental climate (Köppen climate classification Dsa). The average annual temperature is 14 °C (57.2 °F). The warmest month is July with an average temperature of 27.4 °C (81.3 °F) and the coolest month is January with an average temperature of −0.6 °C (30.9 °F). The average annual precipitation is 465.5mm (18.3") and has an average of 68.9 days with precipitation. The wettest month is March with an average of 77.7mm (3.1") of precipitation and the driest month is August with an average of 1.9mm (0.08") of precipitation.

Climate data for Konibodom
Month	Jan	Feb	Mar	Apr	May	Jun	Jul	Aug	Sep	Oct	Nov	Dec	Year
Daily mean °C (°F)	−0.6 (30.9)	1.7 (35.1)	8.6 (47.5)	16.0 (60.8)	21.0 (69.8)	25.6 (78.1)	27.4 (81.3)	25.3 (77.5)	20.4 (68.7)	13.8 (56.8)	7.3 (45.1)	1.9 (35.4)	14.0 (57.2)
Average precipitation mm (inches)	52.1 (2.05)	54.9 (2.16)	77.7 (3.06)	69.9 (2.75)	52.3 (2.06)	12.0 (0.47)	7.7 (0.30)	1.9 (0.07)	5.0 (0.20)	39.7 (1.56)	43.0 (1.69)	49.3 (1.94)	465.5 (18.33)
Average precipitation days (≥ 0.1 mm)	7.6	8.0	9.4	9.1	8.1	3.6	1.9	1.1	1.7	5.1	6.0	7.3	68.9
Average relative humidity (%)	75.7	73.0	65.1	58.1	49.9	39.2	39.5	43.1	46.1	56.7	66.8	75.3	57.4
Source: "The Climate of Konibodom". Weatherbase.

== Subdivisions ==
Before ca. 2018, Konibodom was the seat of Konibodom District, which covered the rural part of the present city of Konibodom. The city of Konibodom covers Konibodom proper and six jamoats. These are as follows:

Jamoat	Population (Jan. 2015)
Hamrabaev	27,143
Lohuti	21,652
Firuzoba	23,813
Patar	17,870
Pulodon	
Kuhandiyor	24,419

== Notable people ==
- Sa'diniso Hakimova, obstetrician and gynecologist
- Lutfi Zohidova, ballet dancer
- Namat Karabaev, the first Hero of the Soviet Union from a Soviet republic.
- Mukarrama Qosimova

== See also ==
- List of cities in Tajikistan
