= Patar, Tajikistan =

Patar Патар (Russian and Tajik)
- Jamoat
- Location in Tajikistan
- Coordinates: 40°20′N 70°27′E
- Country: Tajikistan
- Region: Sughd Region
- City: Konibodom

Population (2015)
  - Total: 17,870
- Time zone: UTC+5 (TJT)
- Official languages: Russian (Interethnic); Tajik (State)

Patar is a village and jamoat in north-western Tajikistan. It is part of the city of Konibodom in Sughd Region. The jamoat has a total population of 17,870 (2015).
