= Lohuti, Tajikistan =

Lohuti Russian: Лохути Tajik: Лоҳутӣ
- Jamoat
- Location in Tajikistan
- Coordinates: 40°15′N 70°08′E
- Country: Tajikistan
- Region: Sughd Region
- City: Konibodom

Population (2015)
  - Total: 21,652
- Time zone: UTC+5 (TJT)
- Official languages: Russian (Interethnic); Tajik (State)

Lohuti (Russian: Лохути; Tajik: Лоҳутӣ) is a town and jamoat in north-western Tajikistan. It is part of the city of Konibodom in Sughd Region. The jamoat has a total population of 21,652 (2015).
