= Imperialis =

Imperialis may refer to:

- Fritillaria imperialis, a plant
- Caenorhabditis imperialis, a nematode
