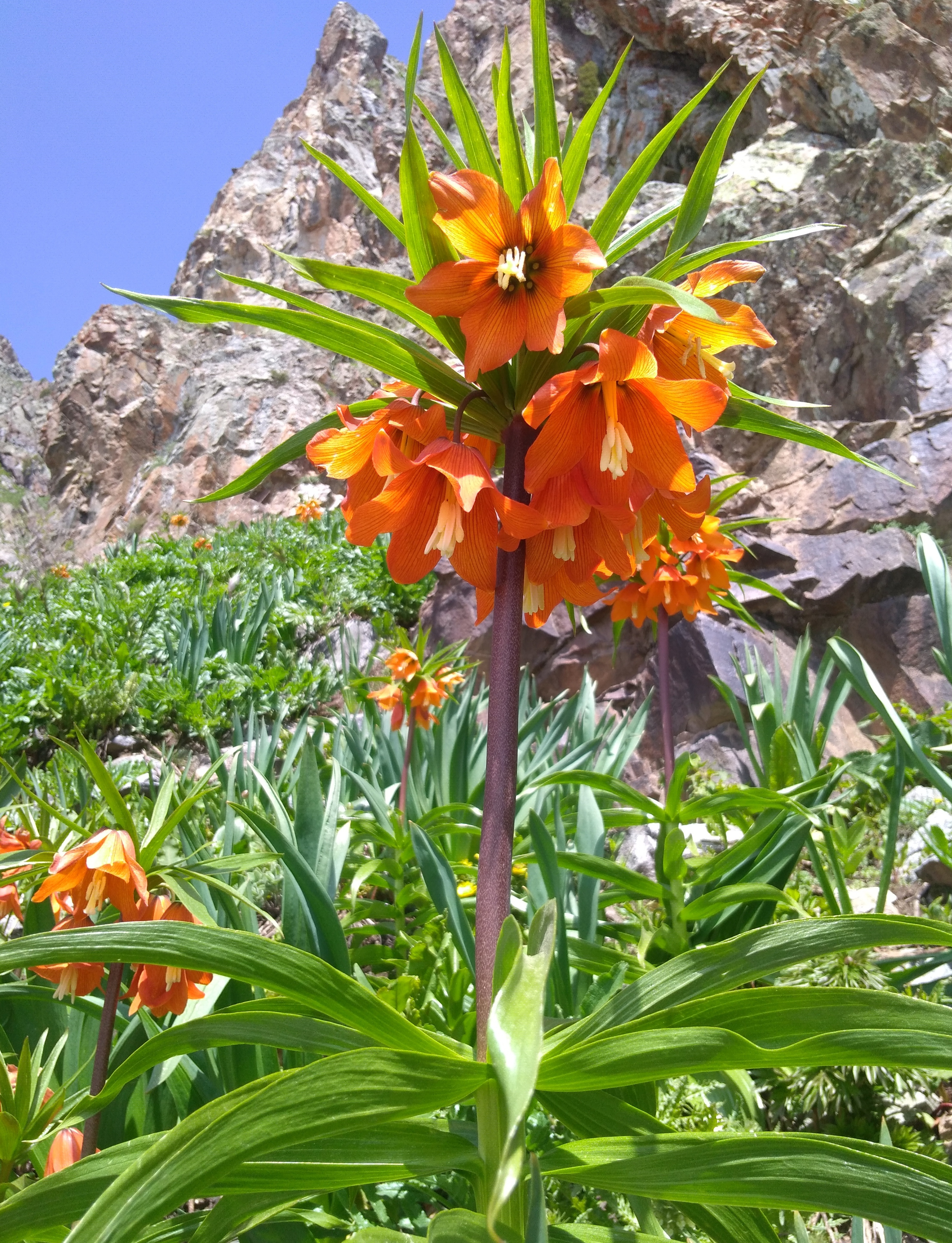
- In habitat at Ilak, Tajikistan

Scientific classification
- Kingdom: Plantae
- Clade: Tracheophytes
- Clade: Angiosperms
- Clade: Monocots
- Order: Liliales
- Family: Liliaceae
- Subfamily: Lilioideae
- Tribe: Lilieae
- Genus: Fritillaria
- Species: F. eduardii

Binomial name
- Fritillaria eduardii A.Regel ex Regel

Synonyms
- Synonymy: Fritillaria imperialis var. eduardii (Regel) Regel; Fritillaria imperialis var. inodora-purpurea Regel; Petilium eduardii (Regel) Vved. (syn of var. eduardii); Fritillaria imperialis var. inodora Regel(syn of var. eduardii); Fritillaria inodora (Regel) Tubergen (syn of var. eduardii)

= Fritillaria eduardii =

Species of flowering plant

Fritillaria eduardii is a species of flowering plant in the family Liliaceae, native to Central Asia. It is closely related to the widely cultivated species, F. imperialis, called "crown imperial."

== Varieties ==
- Fritillaria eduardii var. inodora (Regel) Wietsma - Tajikistan, Uzbekistan
- Fritillaria eduardii var. eduardii - Tajikistan, Uzbekistan, Kyrgyzstan
