= Takhtialif =

Takhtialif Тахтиалиф
- Location in Tajikistan
- Coordinates: 38°37′N 69°29′E
- Country: Tajikistan
- Region: Districts of Republican Subordination
- District: Fayzobod District
- Official languages: Russian (Interethnic); Tajik (State)

Takhtialif (Russian and Tajik: Тахтиалиф, also: Takhtakhamit) is a village in central Tajikistan. It is part of the jamoat Chashmasor in Fayzobod District, one of the Districts of Republican Subordination. It lies near the river Elok, a tributary of the Kofarnihon. It is on the Pamir Highway, 40 kilometers east of Dushanbe, and has a Köppen climate classification of Dsa.
