= Pieter van Kouwenhoorn =

Dutch illustrator

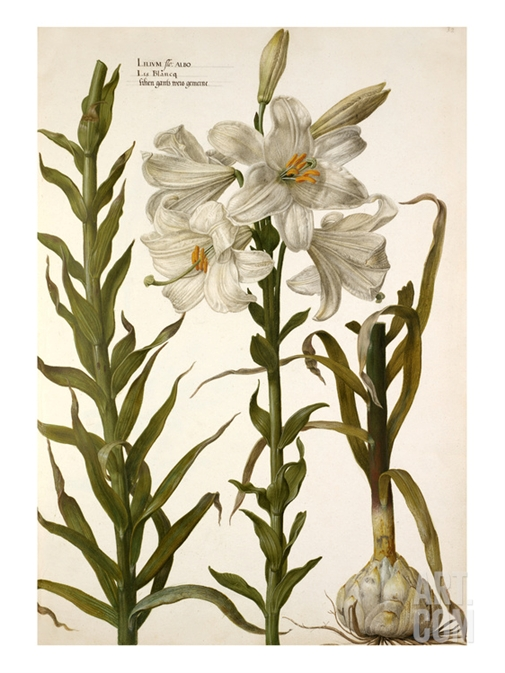
Lilium longiflorum

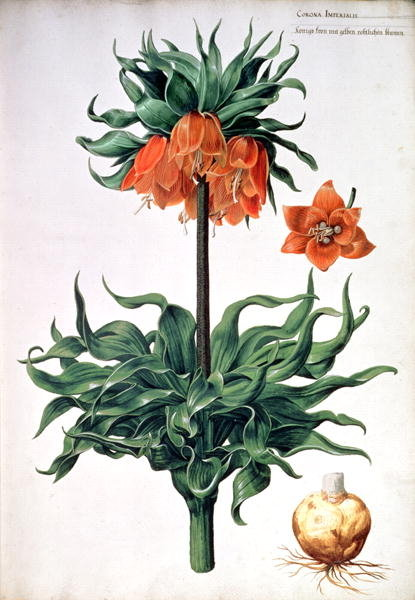
Fritillaria imperialis

Pieter van Kouwenhoorn a.k.a. Pieter Kouwenhoorn (1599 in Haarlem – c. 21 May 1654 in Leiden) (fl. 1620s – 1630s) was a Dutch botanical illustrator. Kouwenhoorn was a glass painter working in Haarlem and Leiden in the Netherlands, and was one of the teachers of the painter Gerard Dou (1613–1675) and Hendrick Jansz. van der Smient (c. 1600 – 1655). He also painted landscapes, portraits and mythological subjects.

He was buried on 21 May 1654 from the 'Hooglandse Kerk' in Leiden.

== Florilegia ==
- "Verzameling van Bloemen naar de Natuur geteekend door Pieter van Kouwenhoorn". Dating from the 1630s this album has 46 paintings with plant names given in Latin, French and German.
