= Dustmurod Aliev (jamoat) =

Jamoat Dustmurod Aliev
- Jamoat
- Location within Tajikistan
- Coordinates: 38°31′N 69°19′E
- Country: Tajikistan
- Region: Districts of Republican Subordination
- District: Fayzobod District

Population (2015)
  - Total: 13,164
- Time zone: UTC+5 (TJT)

Dustmurod Aliev (Tajik: Деҳоти Дӯстмурод Алиев, formerly Jamoat Fayzobod) is a jamoat in Tajikistan. It is located in Fayzobod District, one of the Districts of Republican Subordination. The jamoat has a total population of 13,164 (2015).
