= Mehrobod, Fayzobod District =

Mehrobod
- Village and Jamoat
- Location within Tajikistan
- Coordinates: 38°32′N 69°12′E
- Country: Tajikistan
- Region: Districts of Republican Subordination
- District: Fayzobod District

Population (2015)
  - Total: 11,885
- Time zone: UTC+5 (TJT)

Mehrobod (Tajik: Меҳробод, Russian: Мехрабад, formerly Gumbuloq) is a village and jamoat in Tajikistan. It is located in Fayzobod District, one of the Districts of Republican Subordination. The jamoat has a total population of 11,885 (2015).
