= Fritillaria chitralensis =

Scientific classification
- Kingdom: Plantae
- Clade: Tracheophytes
- Clade: Angiosperms
- Clade: Monocots
- Order: Liliales
- Family: Liliaceae
- Subfamily: Lilioideae
- Tribe: Lilieae
- Genus: Fritillaria
- Species: F. chitralensis

Binomial name
- Fritillaria chitralensis (auct.) B.Mathew

Synonyms
- Fritillaria imperialis var. chitralensis auct., published anonymously

Species of flowering plant

Fritillaria chitralensis is a species of flowering plant in the lily family Liliaceae, native to Afghanistan and the Chitral District of northern Pakistan.

It is closely related to the more widely cultivated species, F. imperialis, called "crown imperial."

Fritillaria chitralensis produces bulbs up to 30 mm across. Stems can reach a height of 45 cm. Flowers are bell-shaped, hanging downwards, bright yellow.

It is currently in cultivation in various nurseries in the UK, probably from specimens cultivated at Kew from the Carter’s collection of bulbs collected in 1970, apparently where the Kunar River enters Afghanistan southwest of Barikot. It was also recorded at Drosh in the Kunar Valley in 1908.

It was pictured in 2023 flourishing in Chitral, on a scree slope with Quercus baloot where it was shown to be pollinated by a small bee.
