= 30-solagii Istiqlol =

30-solagii istiqlol 30-солагии истиқлол
- town
- Location within Tajikistan
- Coordinates: 38°41′N 69°33′E
- Country: Tajikistan
- Region: Districts of Republican Subordination
- District: Fayzobod District

Population (2015)
  - Total: 17,749
- Time zone: UTC+5 (TJT)

30-solagii istiqlol (before 30 May 2022 Miskinobod; Tajik: 30-солагии истиқлол) is a town (before 2022 jamoat and village) in Tajikistan. It is located in Fayzobod District, one of the Districts of Republican Subordination. The jamoat has a total population of 17,749 (2015).
