= Qalaidasht =

- Village and Jamoat
- Location within Tajikistan
- Coordinates: 38°38′N 69°30′E
- Country: Tajikistan
- Region: Districts of Republican Subordination
- District: Fayzobod District

Population (2015)
  - Total: 12,074
- Time zone: UTC+5 (TJT)
- Official languages: Russian (Interethnic); Tajik (State) (Note: Constitution of Tajikistan)

Qalaidasht (Tajik: Қалъаидашт, Persian: قلعه دشت) is a village and jamoat in Tajikistan. It is located in Fayzobod District, one of the Districts of Republican Subordination. The jamoat has a total population of 12,074 (2015). It consists of 7 villages, including Ilak.

== Geography ==
Qalaidasht is on the Pamir Highway, 45 kilometers east of Dushanbe in the valley of the river Elok, a tributary of the Kofarnihon. It has a Köppen climate classification of Dsa and experiences wet and cold winters with dry cool summers.
