= Chashmasor, Fayzobod District =

Chashmasor
- Village and Jamoat
- Location within Tajikistan
- Coordinates: 38°37′N 69°27′E
- Country: Tajikistan
- Region: Districts of Republican Subordination
- District: Fayzobod District
- Time zone: UTC+5 (TJT)

Chashmasor (Tajik: Чашмасор, Persian: چشمه‌سار) is a village and jamoat in Tajikistan. It is located in Fayzobod District, one of the Districts of Republican Subordination. It consists of 7 villages, including Chashmasor (the seat) and Takhtialif.
