= Ilak (village) =

Ilak Элок
- Village
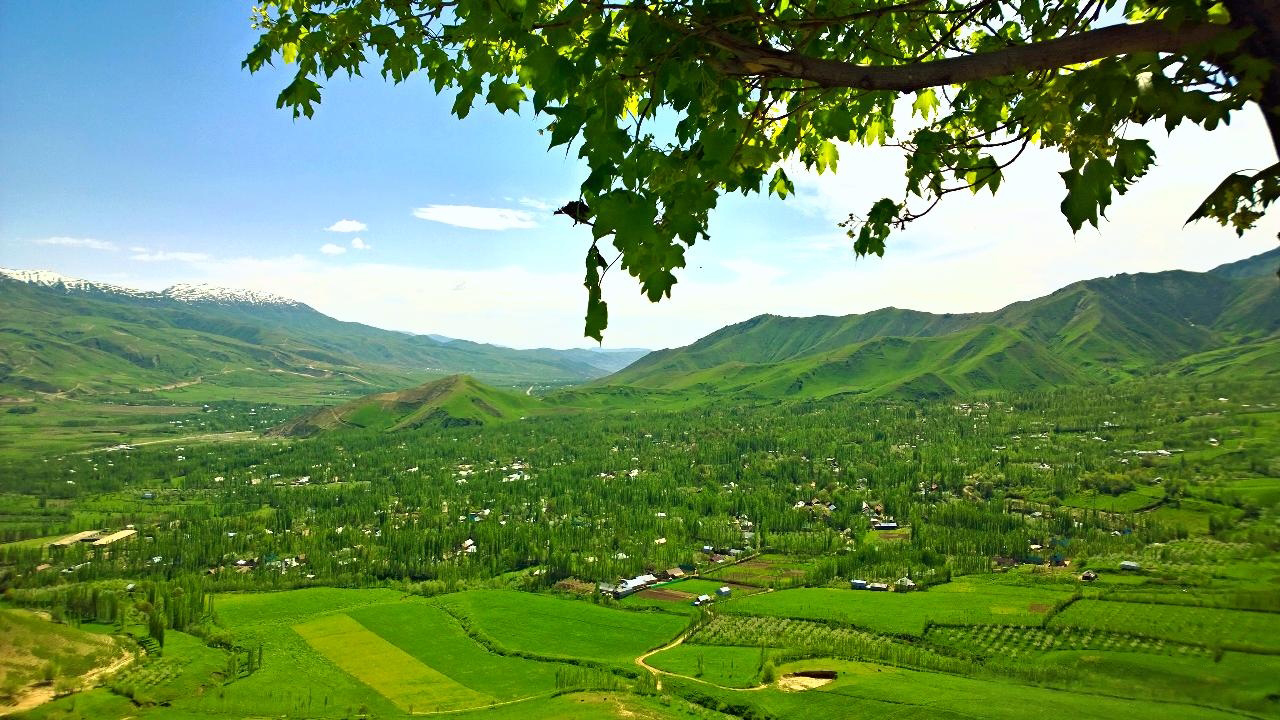

- Location within Tajikistan
- Coordinates: 38°40′N 69°31′E
- Country: Tajikistan
- Region: Districts of Republican Subordination
- District: Fayzobod District
- Jamoat: Qalaidasht

Population (2010)
  - Total: 2,049
- Time zone: UTC+5 (TJT)

Ilak (Tajik: Элок) is a village in Fayzobod District, Districts of Republican Subordination, Tajikistan. At the 2010 census, its population was 2049, in 524 families.
