= Javonon =

- Village and Jamoat
- Location within Tajikistan
- Coordinates: 38°34′N 69°20′E
- Country: Tajikistan
- Region: Districts of Republican Subordination
- District: Fayzobod District

Population (2015)
  - Total: 13,359
- Time zone: UTC+5 (TJT)

Javonon (Persian: جوانان) is a town and jamoat in Tajikistan. It is located in Fayzobod District, one of the Districts of Republican Subordination. The jamoat has a total population of 13,359 (2015).
