= Vashgird =

- Jamoat
- Location within Tajikistan
- Coordinates: 38°32′N 69°14′E
- Country: Tajikistan
- Region: Districts of Republican Subordination
- District: Fayzobod District

Population (2015)
  - Total: 5,509
- Time zone: UTC+5 (TJT)
- Official languages: Russian (Interethnic); Tajik (State)

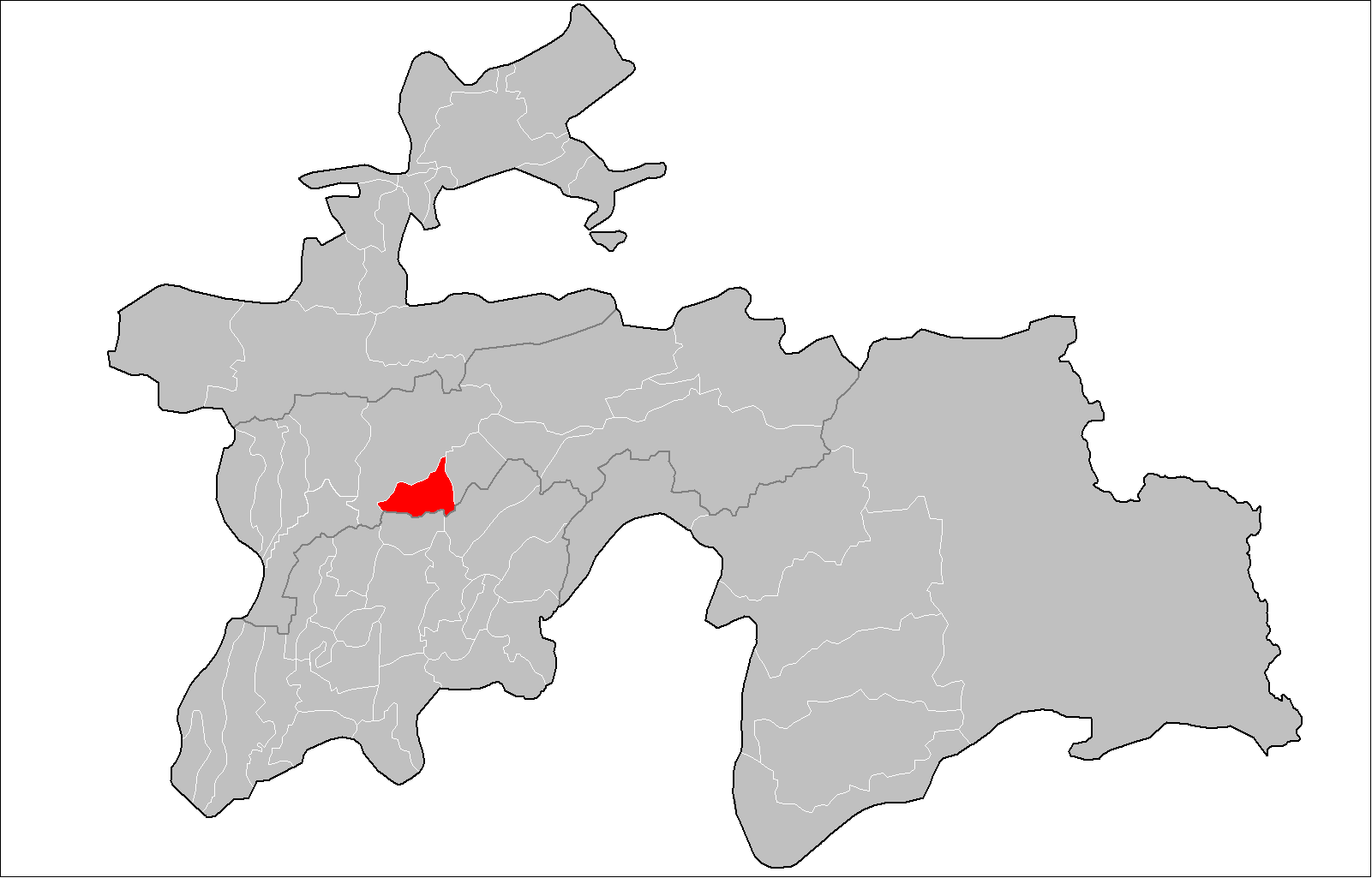
Location of Fayzobod District in Tajikistan

Vashgird (Russian and Tajik: Вашгирд, Persian: ویشگرد) is a jamoat in Tajikistan. It is located in Fayzobod District, one of the Districts of Republican Subordination. The jamoat has a total population of 5,509 (2015).
