= Fayzabad, Tajikistan =

Fayzabad
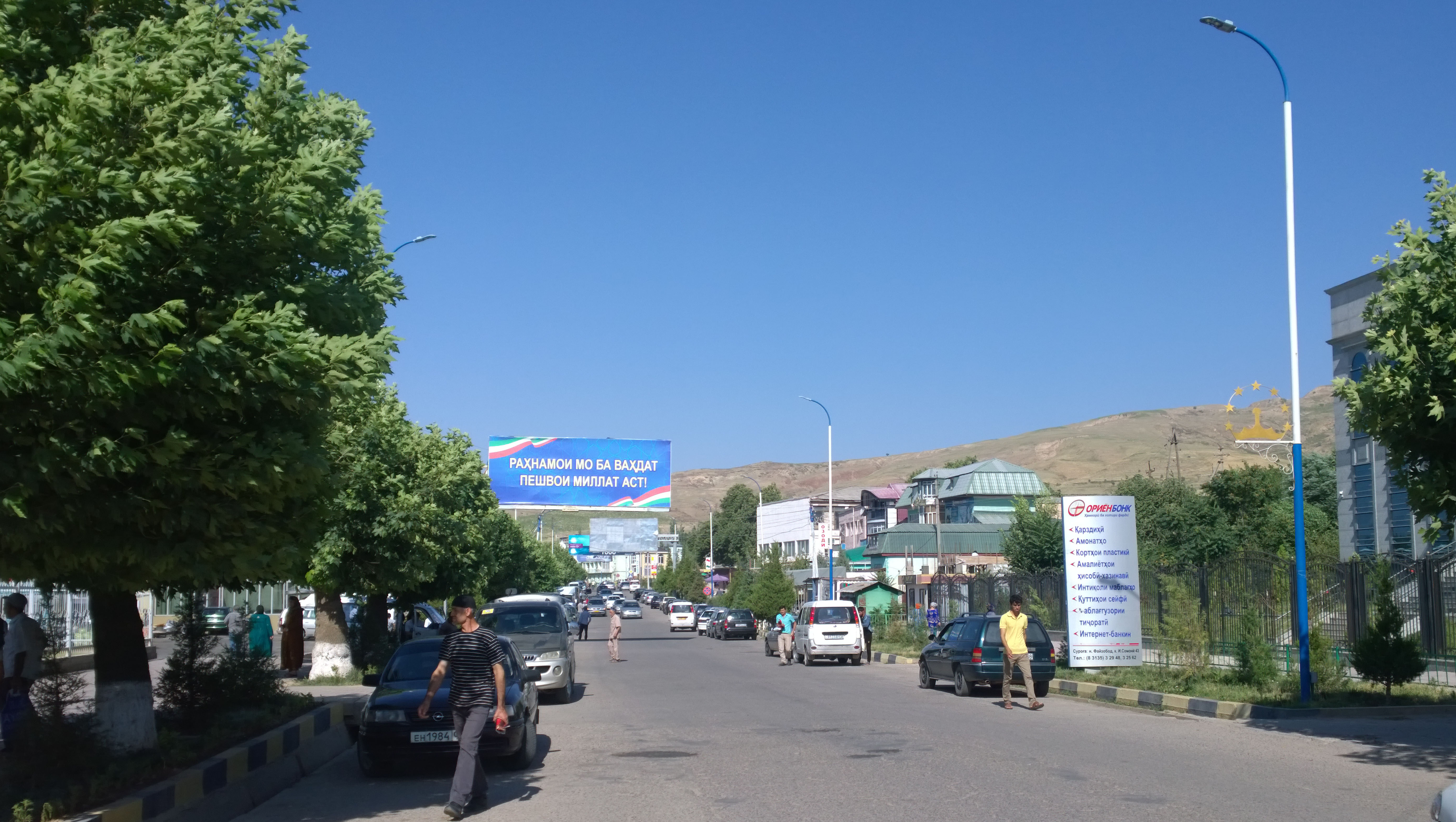

- Location in Tajikistan
- Coordinates: 38°33′N 69°19′E
- Country: Tajikistan
- Region: Districts of Republican Subordination
- District: Fayzabad District

Population (2020)
  - Total: 10,400

Fayzabad (Tajik: Файзобод, Russian: Файзабад) is a town in Tajikistan. It is located in the Rasht Valley, 50 km east of Dushanbe. It is the seat of Fayzabad District. The Sari Mazar mausoleum in Fayzabad holds the remains of 8th-century Sufi saint Abu Abdurahmon from Balkh. The population of the town is 10,400 (January 2020 estimate).
