= Caenorhabditis imperialis =

Scientific classification
- Domain: Eukaryota
- Kingdom: Animalia
- Phylum: Nematoda
- Class: Chromadorea
- Order: Rhabditida
- Family: Rhabditidae
- Genus: Caenorhabditis
- Species: C. imperialis

Binomial name
- Caenorhabditis imperialis Félix, Marie-Anne; Braendle, Christian; Cutter, Asher D., 2014

Synonyms
- Caenorhabditis sp. 14

Species of roundworm

Caenorhabditis imperialis is a species of nematodes in the genus Caenorhabditis. Prior to 2014, it was referred to as C. sp. 14. The type isolate was collected in Mo'orea, French Polynesia, and other isolates were collected in Guadeloupe.

This species groups with C. afra in the 'Japonica' group, the sister clade to the 'Elegans' group, in the 'Elegans' supergroup.
