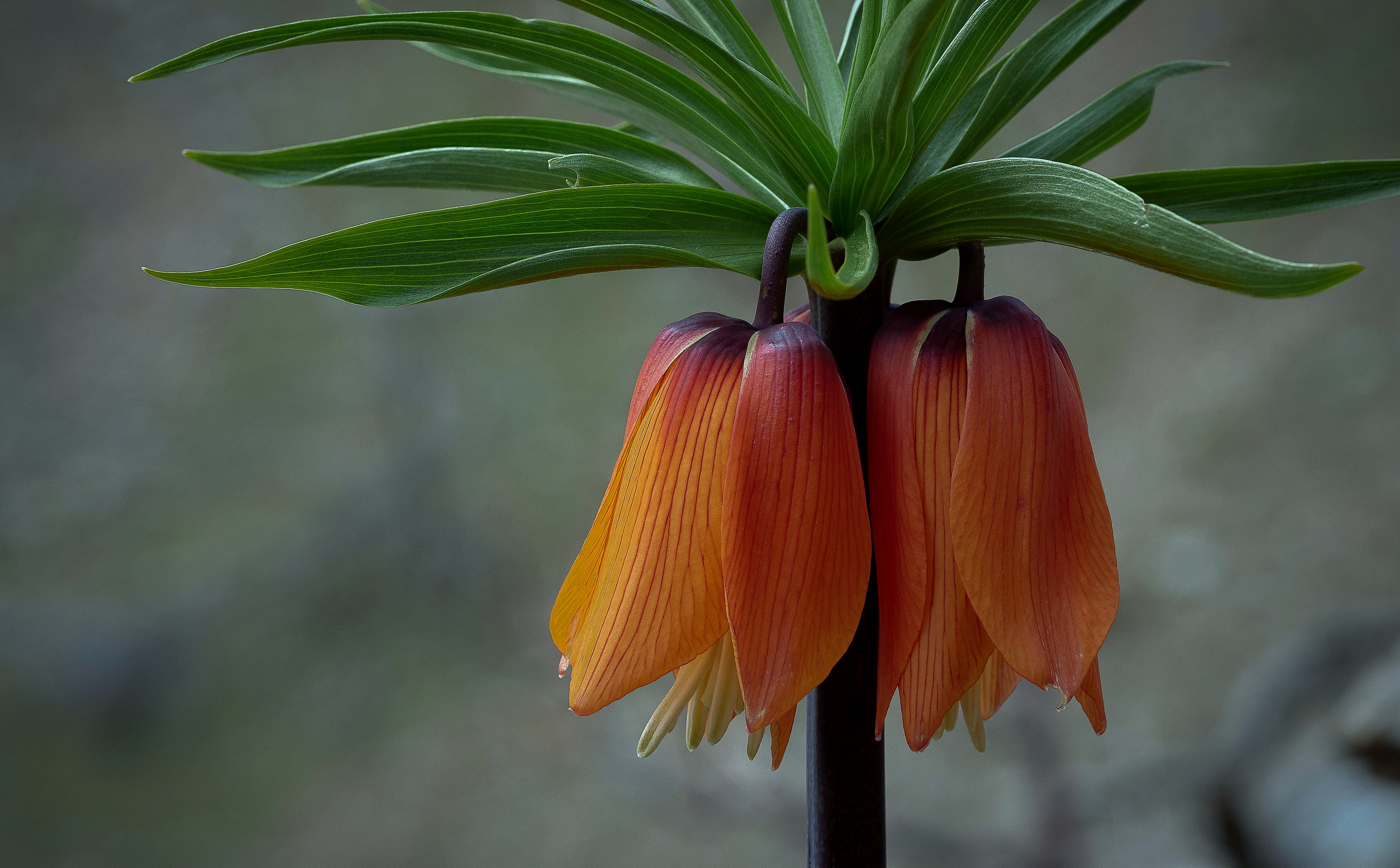

Scientific classification
- Kingdom: Plantae
- Clade: Embryophytes
- Clade: Tracheophytes
- Clade: Angiosperms
- Clade: Monocots
- Order: Liliales
- Family: Liliaceae
- Subfamily: Lilioideae
- Genus: Fritillaria
- Species: F. imperialis

Binomial name
- Fritillaria imperialis L.

Synonyms
- Synonymy: Fritillaria aintabensis Post; Fritillaria corona-imperialis Panz.; Fritillaria corona-imperialis Gaertn.; Fritillaria imperialis var. longipetala auct.; Fritillaria imperialis var. maxima Eeden; Fritillaria imperialis var. rubra-maxima auct.; [Imperialis comosa Moench; Imperialis coronata Dum.Cours.; Imperialis superba Mirb.; Lilium persicum E.H.L.Krause; Petilium imperiale (L.) J.St.-Hil.; Petilium imperiale Jaume

= Fritillaria imperialis =

Species of flowering plant in the lily family

Fritillaria imperialis, the crown imperial, imperial fritillary or Kaiser's crown, is a species of flowering plant in the lily family Liliaceae, native to a wide stretch of Asia including Turkey, Iran (e.g. Kurdistan), Iraq, Afghanistan, Pakistan, Northern India, and the Himalayan foothills. It is also widely cultivated as an ornamental and reportedly naturalized in Austria, Sicily, and Washington State, US. The common names and the epithet "imperialis", literally "of the emperor", refer to the large circle of golden flowers, reminiscent of an emperor's crown.

== Taxonomy ==
A few names have been coined for taxa once considered as belonging to Fritillaria imperialis but now regarded as distinct species:

- Fritillaria imperialis var. chitralensis, now called Fritillaria chitralensis
- Fritillaria imperialis var. eduardii, now called Fritillaria eduardii
- Fritillaria imperialis var. inodora, now called Fritillaria eduardii var. inodora
- Fritillaria imperialis var. inodora-purpurea, now called Fritillaria eduardii var. eduardii

== Description ==
Fritillaria imperialis grows to about 1 m (3 ft) in height, and bears lance-shaped, glossy leaves at intervals along the stem. It bears a prominent whorl of downward facing flowers at the top of the stem, topped by a 'crown' of small leaves, hence the name. While the wild form is usually orange-red, various colours are found in cultivation, ranging from nearly a true scarlet through oranges to yellow. The pendulous flowers make a bold statement in the late spring garden; in the northern hemisphere, flowering takes place in late spring, accompanied by a distinctly foxy odour that repels mice, moles and other small animals.

== Pollination ==
F. imperialis is a bird-pollinated species, with adaptations for ornithophily by passerine birds. It is not known what species pollinate it in its native range. However, pollination has been observed in its introduced European range, including Eurasian blue tits, great tits, willow warblers, Eurasian blackcap, and garden warblers. This makes it a rare example of ornithophily at northern latitudes. On the other hand, some other bird species nectar rob instead of pollinating, and bumblebees are ineffective pollinators despite visiting the flowers for nectar.

== Cultivation ==
The species and the yellow-flowered 'Maximea Lutea' have both gained the Royal Horticultural Society's Award of Garden Merit. Other cultivars in shades of red, yellow and orange, are available.

Like other members of the lily family, F. imperialis is susceptible to depredation by the scarlet lily beetle (Lilioceris lilii).

F. imperialis is easy to grow in well-drained soil in a sunny site. The plant is drought tolerant, and bulbs should be planted in the early autumn. Note that bulbs do not like to be out in the air for long.

== Role in the culture of Iran ==
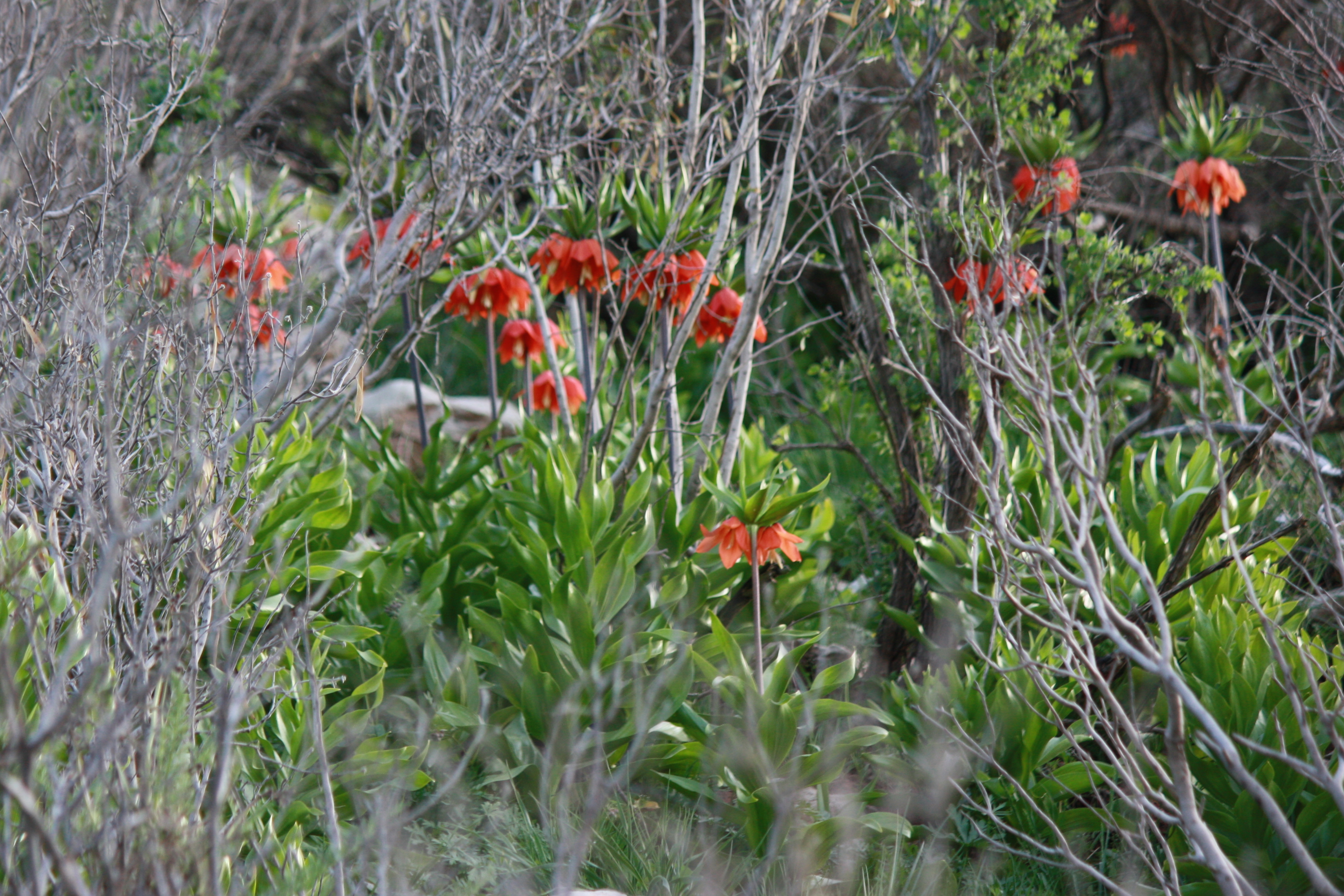
Fritillaria imperialis in Dena, Iran

The flower has a long and deep connection with the history, religion, mythology and folklore of its native Iran and, as a result, has acquired a wealth of evocative vernacular names, often referencing the pendent form of the blossoms and the tear-like nectar drops borne by the six nectaries. In Iranian folklore the nodding flowers are described (in comparison with the upright flowers of tulips) as being 'upside-down', this curious posture being attributed to the plant's bowing its (originally upright) 'head' in sorrow upon the death of a mythological or religious personage. Likewise, the glistening drops of nectar at the base of each flower are described as the tears which the plant weeps in mourning the departed. Depictions of the distinctive inflorescences may be seen on the sculpted capitals of Sassanid columns, as at Taq-e Bostan. F. imperialis is linked to the legend of the death of Siyâvash, a semi-divine hero in the Iranian national epic Shahnameh, whence the common name Ashk-e Sivash ('Tear of Siyâvash').

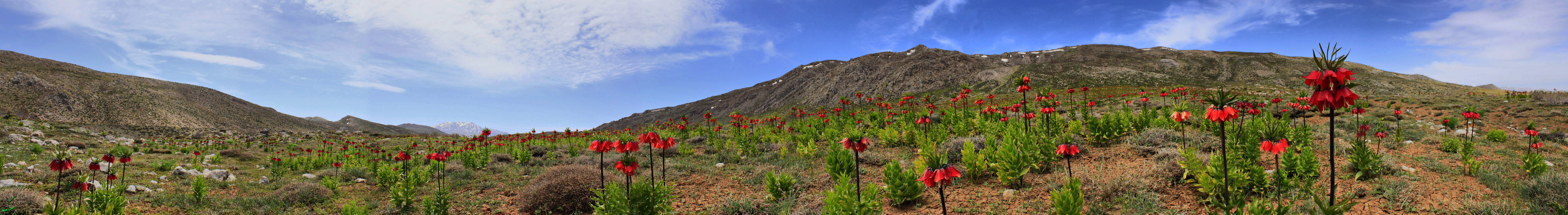
Crown imperial plain, Fars, Iran

== Gallery ==
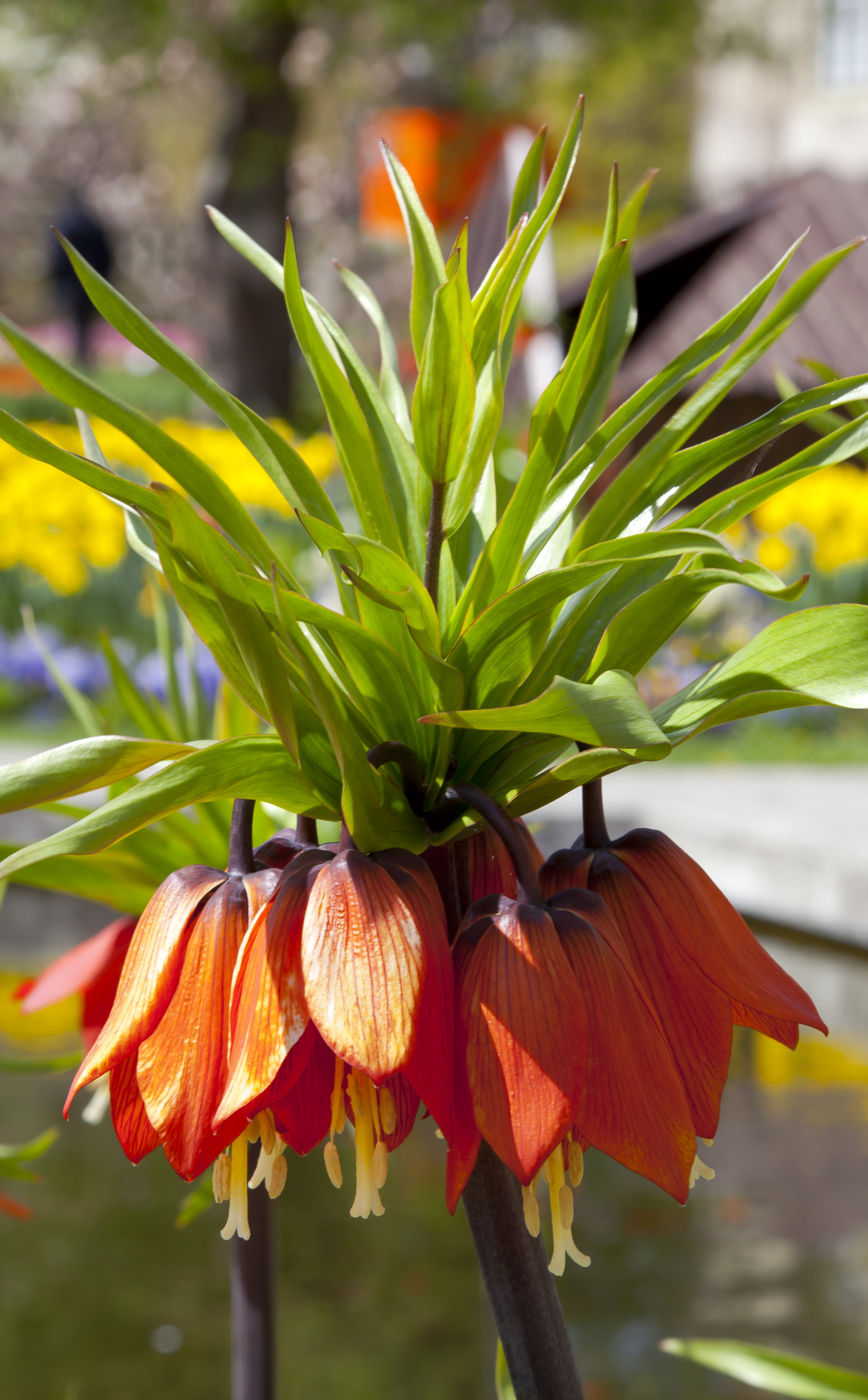
Fritillaria imperialis in botanic garden, Germany

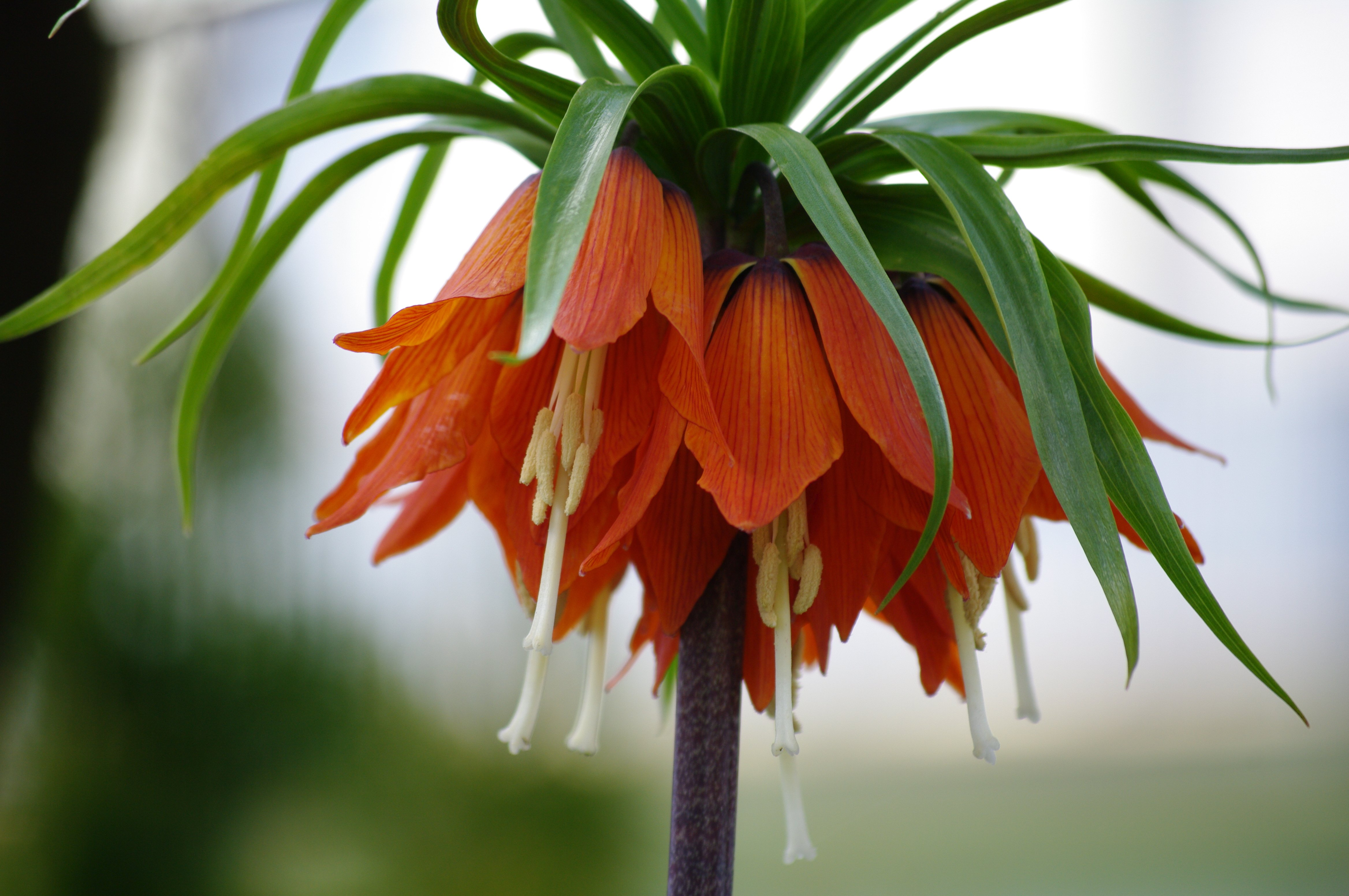
'Rubra Maxima'

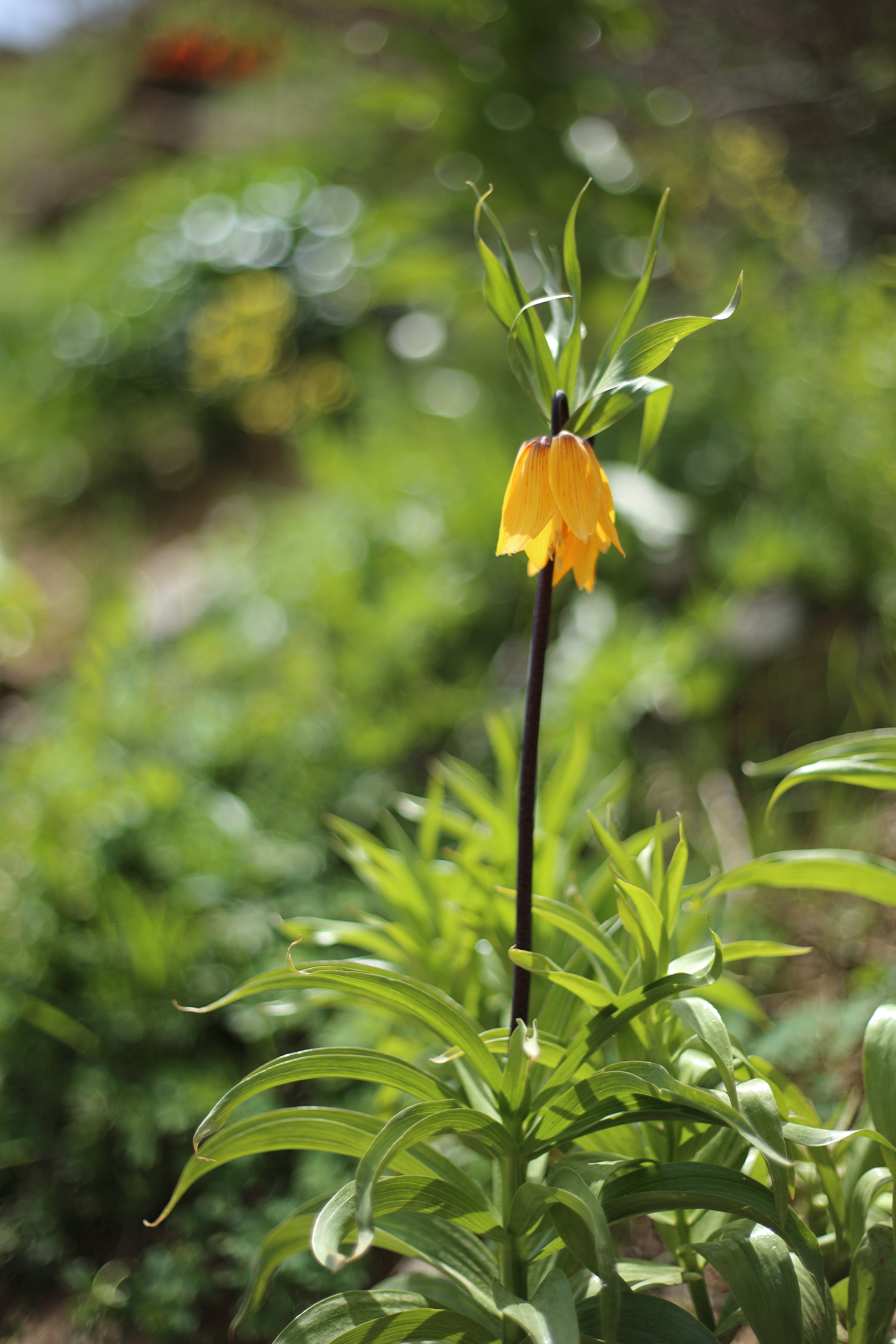
Kurdistan, Iran

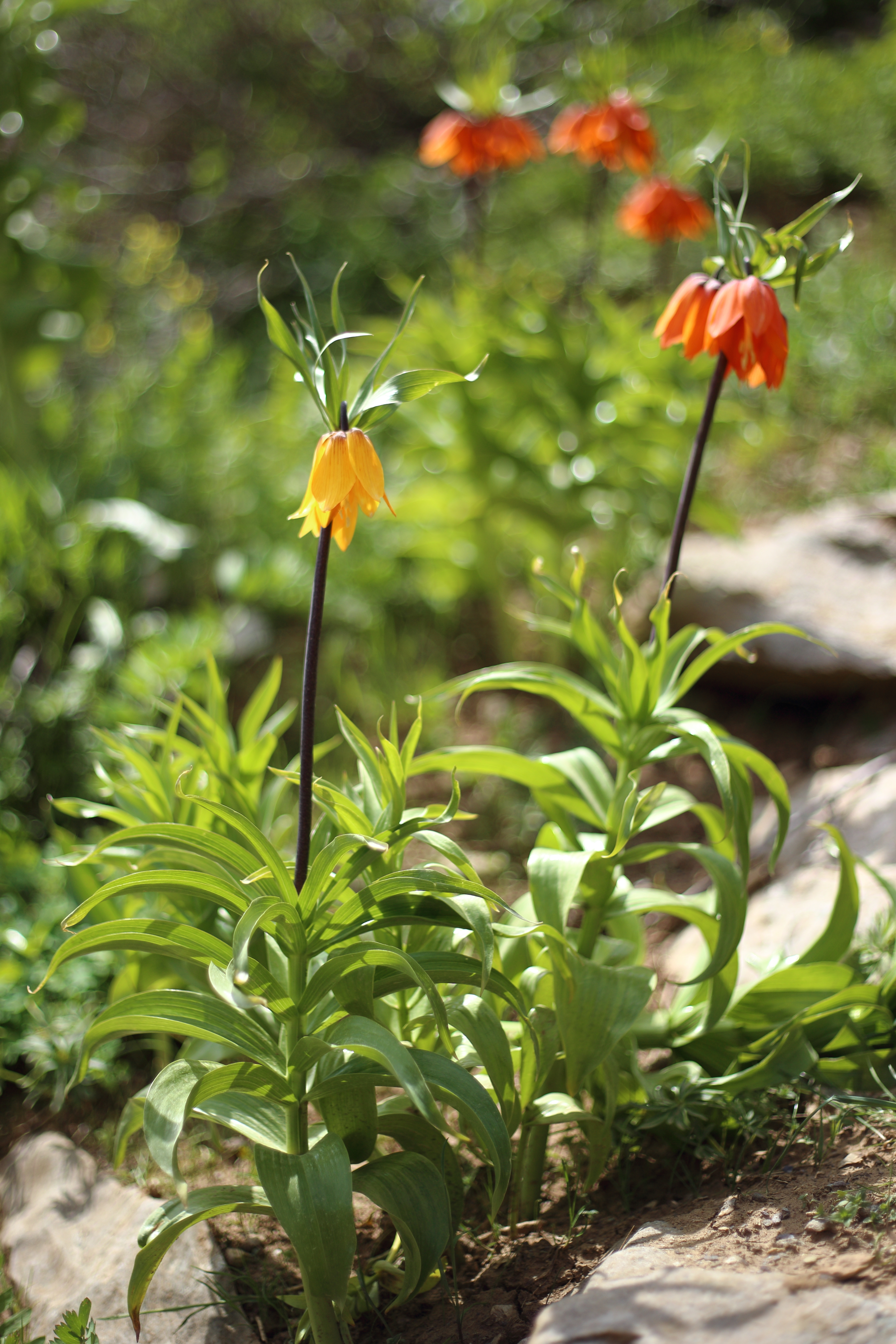
Kurdistan, Iran

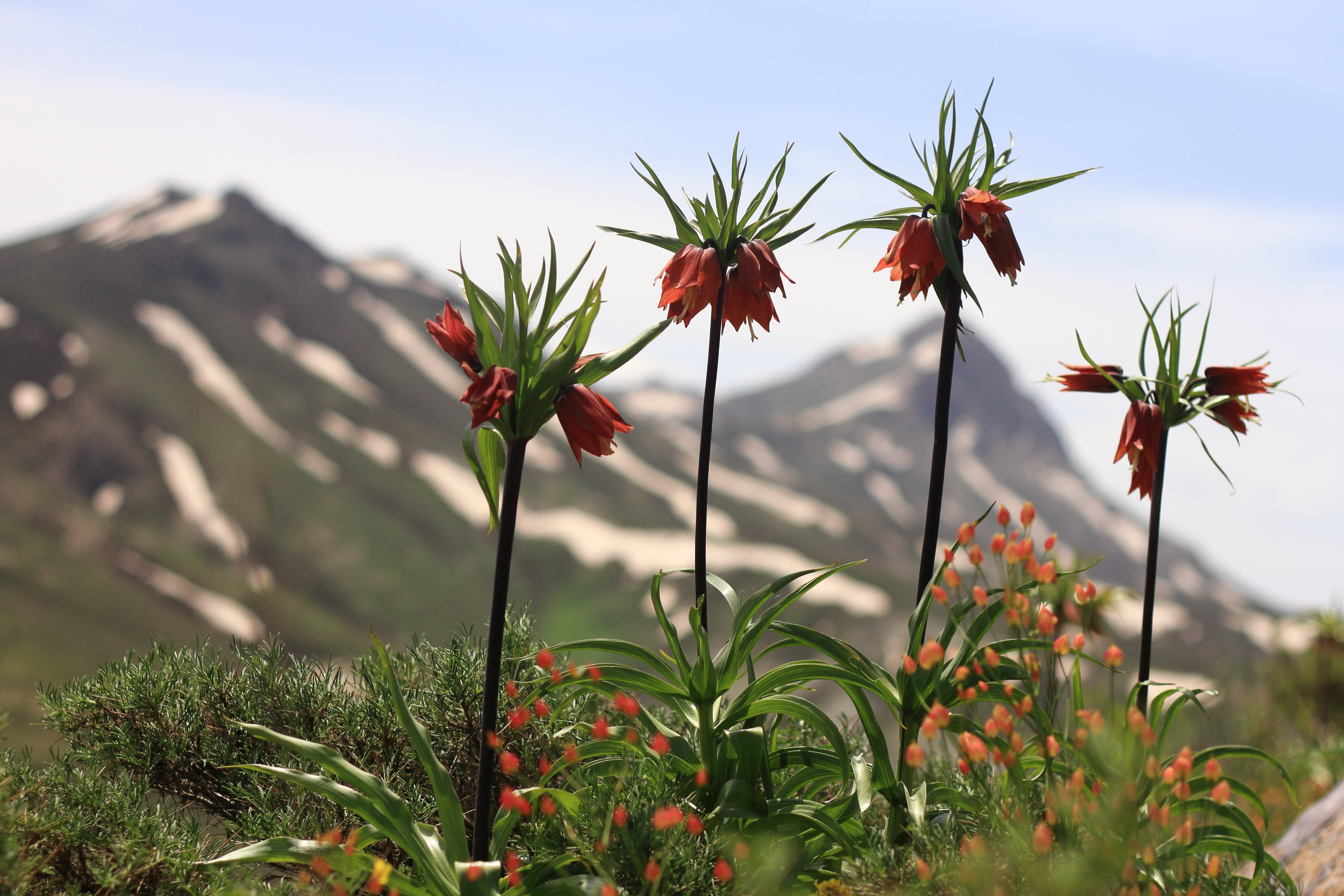
Kurdistan, Iran

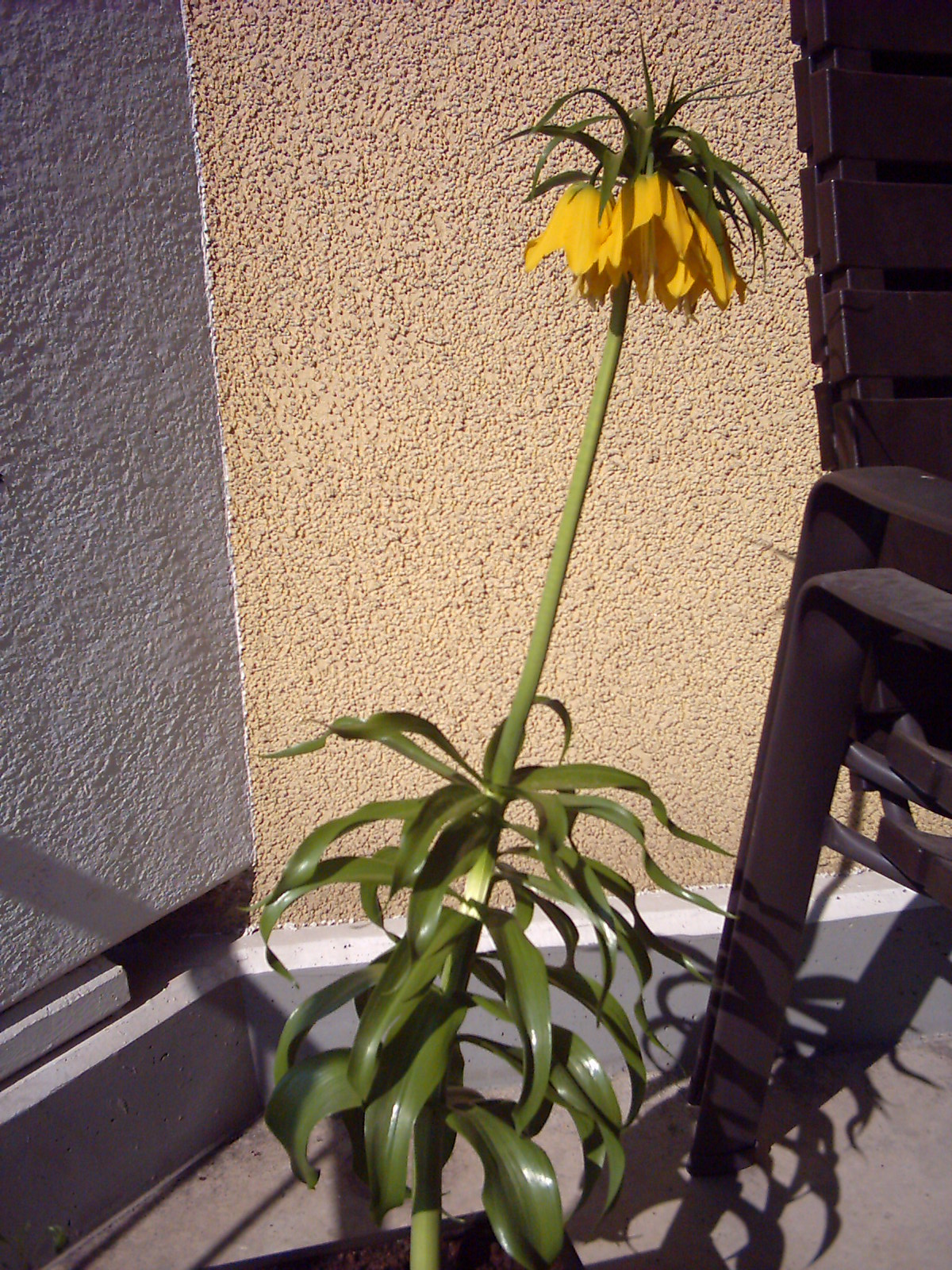
View of the whole plant

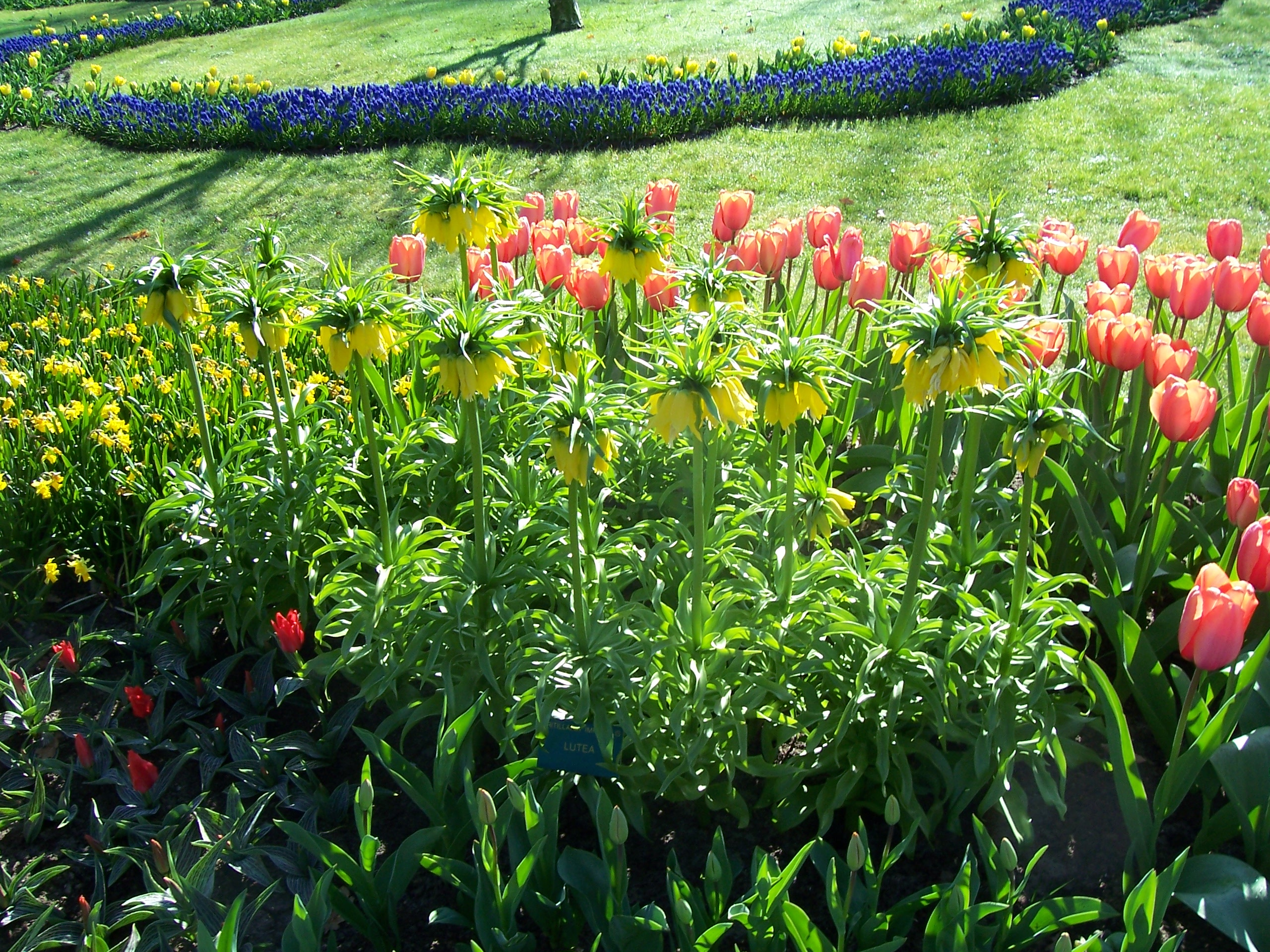
Keukenhof, Lisse, Netherlands

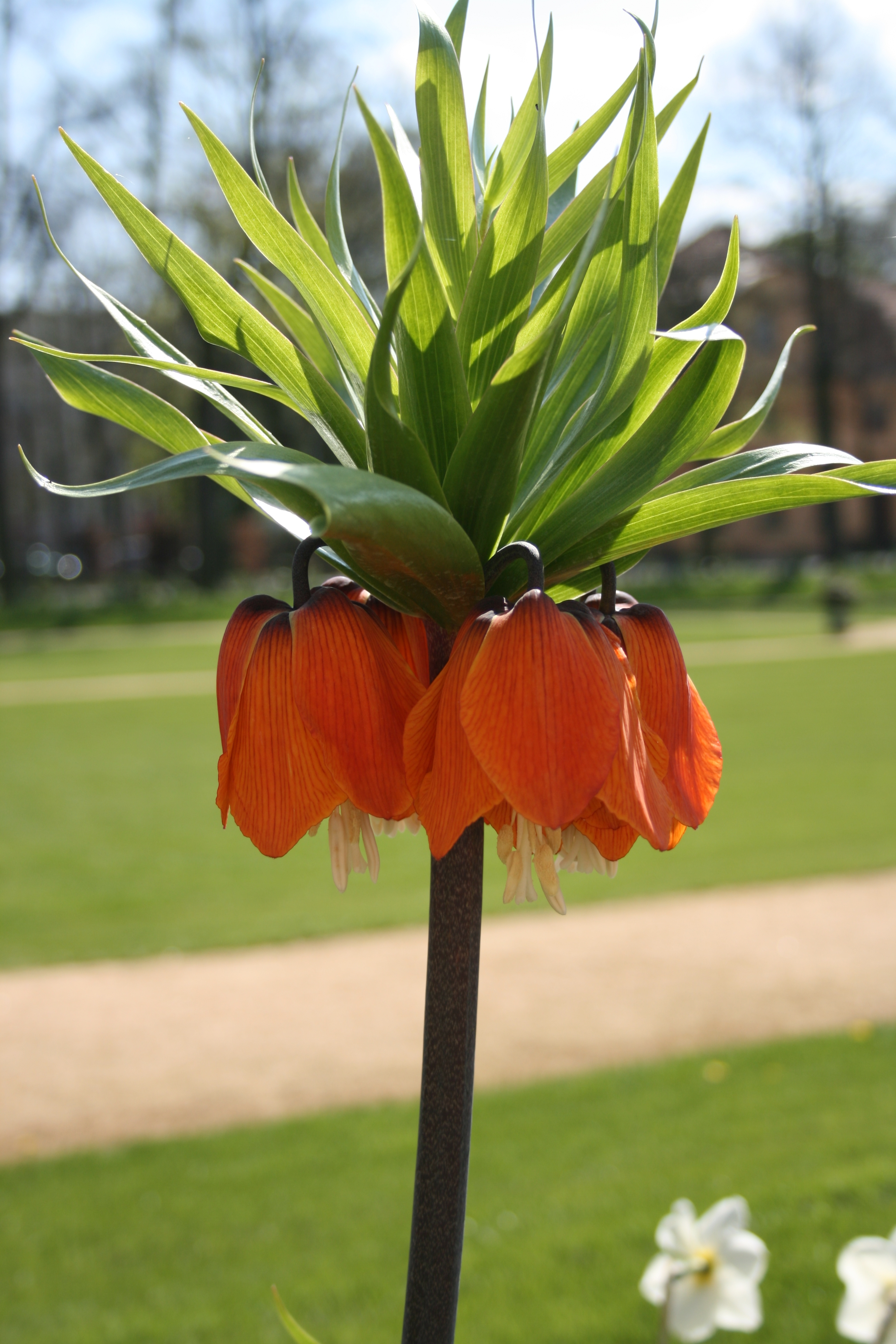
Charlottenburg Palace garden

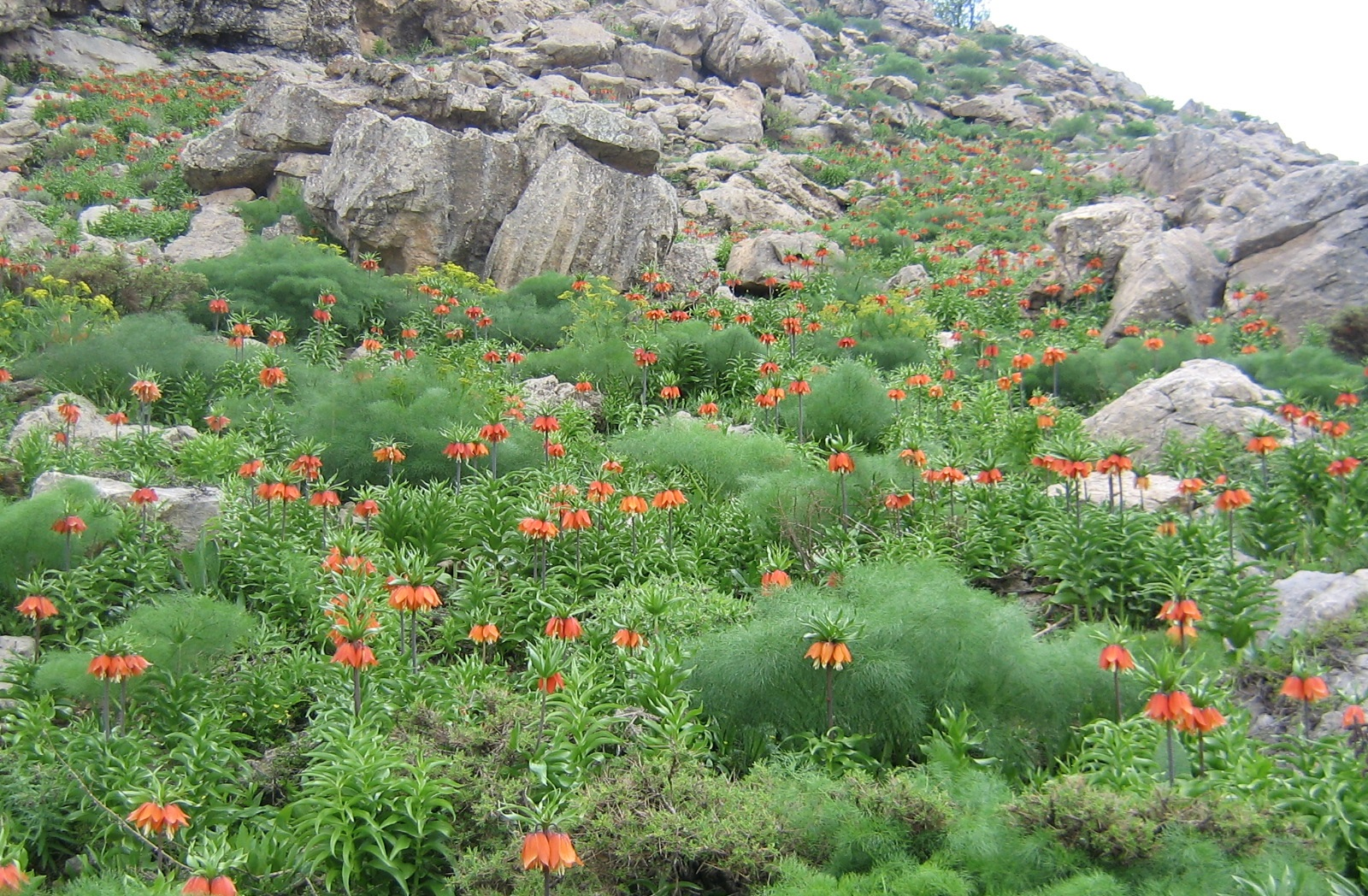
Fritillaria imperialis in Siirt, Turkey

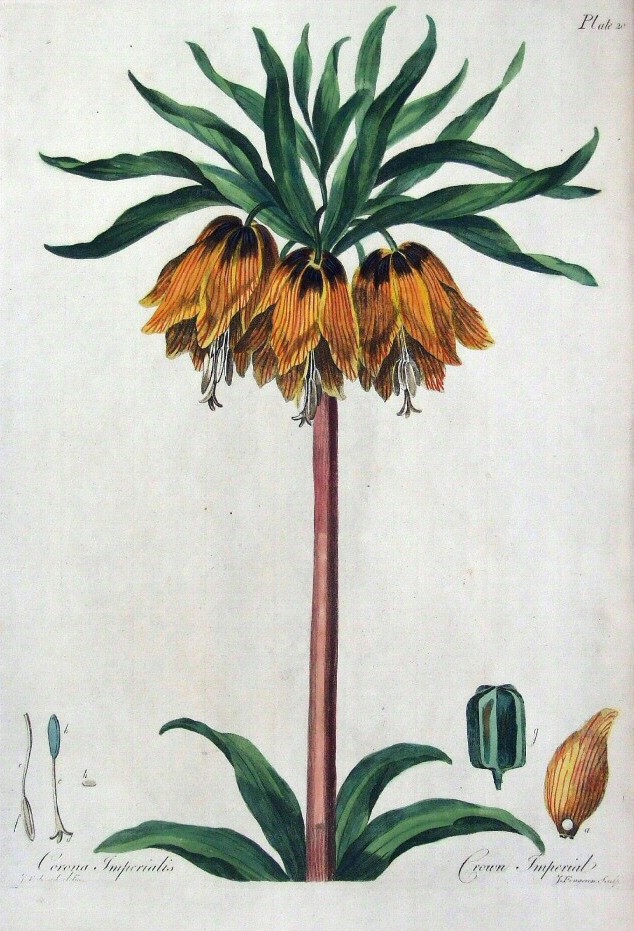
Illustration in John Edwards, The British Herbal, 1769

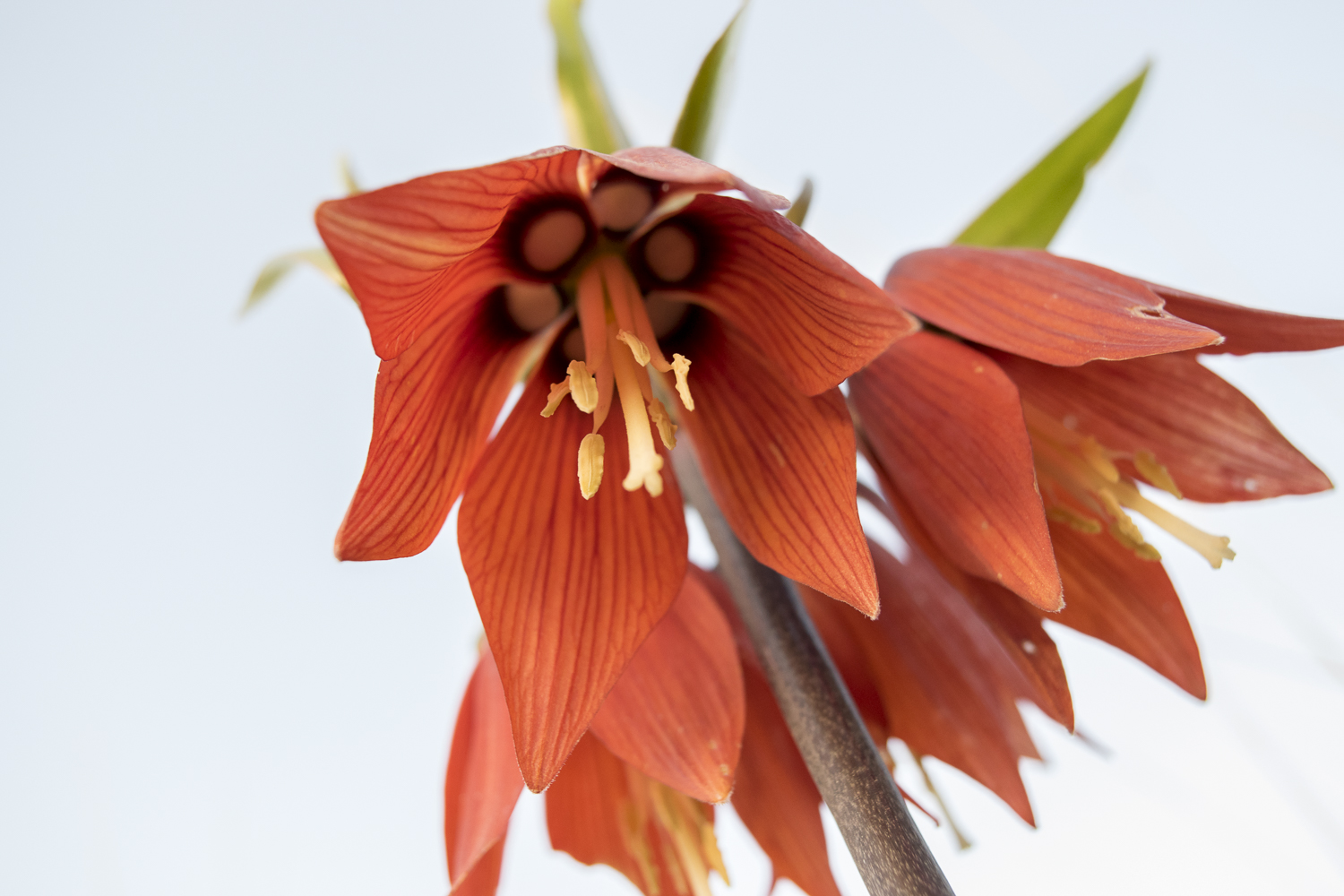
Khansar, Iran. This picture shows the six nectaries, dark spots each with a drop of nectar.

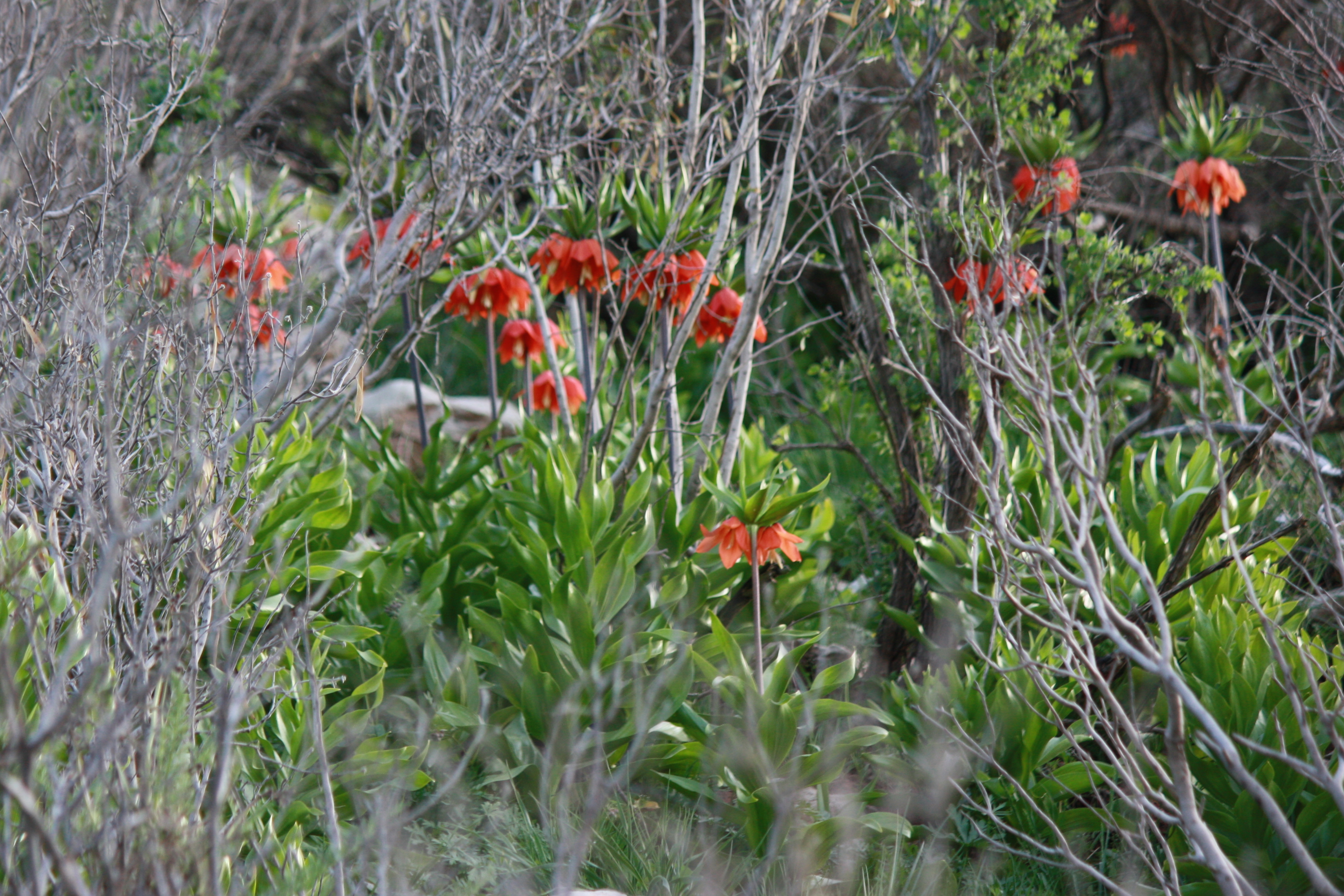
Fritillaria imperialis in Dena, Iran
