= Fayzabad District, Tajikistan =

Fayzabad District Tajik: Ноҳияи Файзобод Russian: Файзабадский район
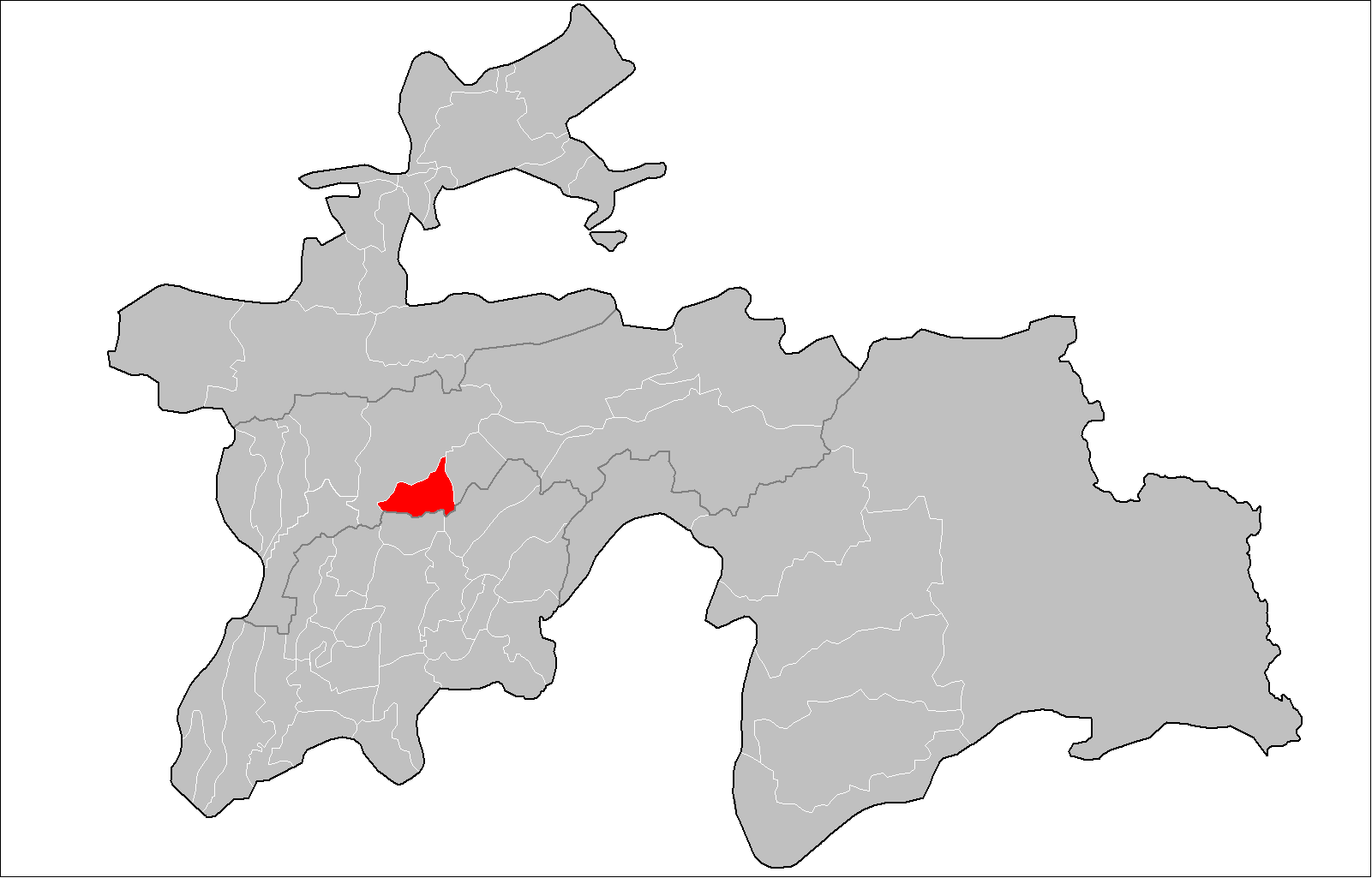
- Location of the district in Tajikistan
- Coordinates: 38°33′N 69°19′E
- Country: Tajikistan
- Region: Districts of Republican Subordination
- Capital: Fayzobod

Area
  - Total: 900 km^{2} (350 sq mi)

Population (2020)
  - Total: 103,600
  - Density: 120/km^{2} (300/sq mi)
- Time zone: UTC+5
- Official languages: Russian (Interethnic); Tajik (State)
- Website: faizobod.tj

Fayzabad District (Tajik: Ноҳияи Файзобод, Russian: Файзабадский район) is a district in Tajikistan. One of the Districts of Republican Subordination, it is about 60 km east of Dushanbe. It borders on the city of Vahdat from the west and the north, the city of Roghun from the east, and the Khatlon Region from the south. Its capital is Fayzobod. The population of the district is 103,600 (January 2020 estimate).

== Administrative divisions ==
The district has an area of about 900 km^{2} (300 sq mi) and is divided administratively into one town and eight jamoats. They are as follows:

Jamoat	Population (Jan. 2015)
Fayzabad	9,400
Dustmurod Aliev	13,164
Buston	8,853
Chashmasor	
Javonon	13,359
Mehrobod	11,885
Miskinobod	17,749
Qalaidasht	12,074
Vashgird	5,509
