= Mehrobod, Asht District =

Mehrobod Мехробод (Russian and Tajik)
- Jamoat
- Location in Tajikistan
- Coordinates: 40°33′N 70°26′E
- Country: Tajikistan
- Region: Sughd Region
- District: Asht District

Population (2015)
  - Total: 13,123
- Time zone: UTC+5 (TJT)

Mehrobod (Tajik: Меҳробод, formerly Kamyshkurgan) is a jamoat in north-west Tajikistan. It is located in Asht District in Sughd Region. The jamoat has a total population of 13,123 (2015). It consists of 6 villages, including Khujiston (the seat, formerly Kamyshkurgan), Boshtol, Qaroqazon and Dulona.
