= Qaroqazon =

- Location in Tajikistan
- Coordinates: 40°33′N 70°18′E
- Country: Tajikistan
- Region: Sughd Region
- District: Asht District
- Official languages: Russian (Interethnic); Tajik (State) (Note: Constitution of Tajikistan)

Qaroqazon (Russian: Кароказон; Tajik: Қароқазон) is a village in Sughd Region, northern Tajikistan. It is part of the jamoat Mehrobod (formerly: Qamishqurghon) in Asht District.
