= Boshtol =

- Location in Tajikistan
- Coordinates: 40°35′N 70°27′E
- Country: Tajikistan
- Region: Sughd Region
- District: Asht District

Boshtol is a village in Sughd Region, northern Tajikistan. It is part of the jamoat Mehrobod (formerly: Qamishqurghon) in Asht District.
