= Orders, decorations, and medals of Tajikistan =

The following is a list of state awards in Tajikistan. State awards include the orders, decorations, and medals.

== Orders ==
Name	Notes
Gold Star of the Hero of Tajikistan	The title of Hero of Tajikistan is the highest state award in Tajikistan, being first awarded in 1996.
Order of the Star of the President of Tajikistan	The Order "Star of the President of Tajikistan" is divided into 3 degrees: I degree is awarded to: heads of state, government and parliaments of foreign states.; II degree is awarded to: ministers, ambassadors and heads of departments of foreign states.; III degree is awarded to: persons holding leading public positions of the Tajik civil service.; Among those awarded with the order was former Mayor of Dushanbe Mahmadsaid Ubaydulloyev and presidential advisor Ozoda Rahmon.
Order of the Crown	
Order of Ismoili Somoni	The Order of Ismoili Somoni is a high distinction of the Republic, named after Isma'il ibn Ahmad. Notable recipients include Ahmad Shah Massoud, Vladimir Putin, and Ban Ki-moon.
Order of the Leader of the Nation - Emomali Rahmon	
Order of Friendship	The Order of Friendship is awarded to statesmen and public figures for their active role in strengthening peace and cooperation between the different ethnicities in Tajikistan.
Order of Spitamen	
Order of Glory	

== Medals ==
=== Military and security forces ===
- Medal of Mercy
- Medal of the Valiant Border Guard of Tajikistan
- Medal "For 15 years of Impeccable Service"
- Medal "5 years of the Armed Forces of the Republic of Tajikistan"
- Medal "10 years of the Armed Forces of the Republic of Tajikistan"
- Medal "15 years of the Armed Forces of the Republic of Tajikistan"
- Medal "75 years of the Tajik Militia"
- Medal "80 years of the Tajik Militia"
- Medal "5 Years of the Presidential Guard"

== Titles ==
=== People's Writer ===
The title of People's Writer is awarded to those who have made advancements in the field of literature. It has been awarded to writers such as Abdumalik Bahori and Jalol Ikrami. It was unveiled on 31 July 2001.

=== People's Poet ===
The title of People's Poet is awarded to those who have made advancements in the field of poetry. Among the notable People's Poets was Zulfiya Atoulloeva (2010), Gulrukhsor Safieva, Aminjan Shokuhi, Mirzo Tursunzoda, Qutbi Kirom, Lāyiq Shēralī and Gulnazar Keldi

=== Soviet era titles ===
- People's Artist of the Tajik SSR

== Gallery ==
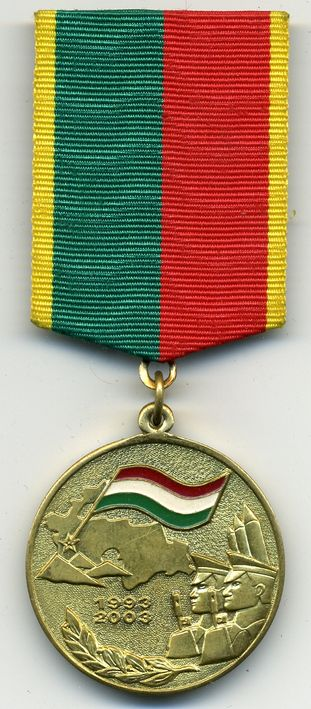
Medal "10 Years of the Tajik Armed Forces

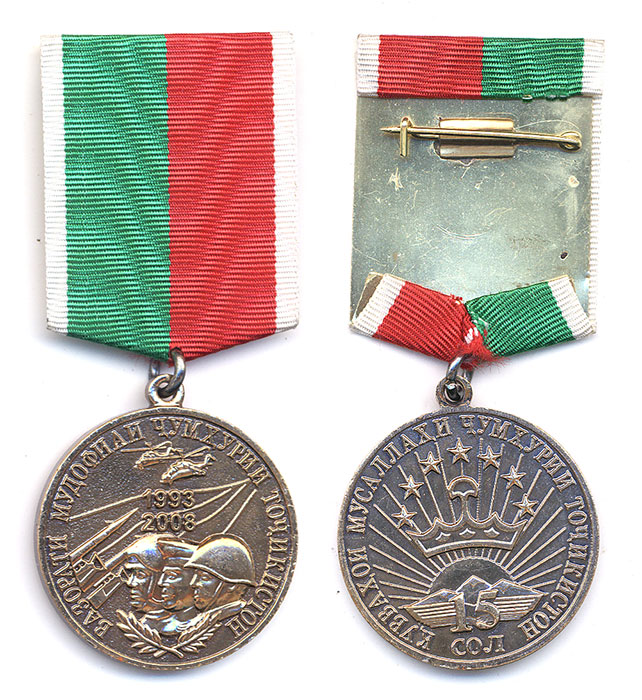
Medal "15 Years of the Tajik Armed Forces

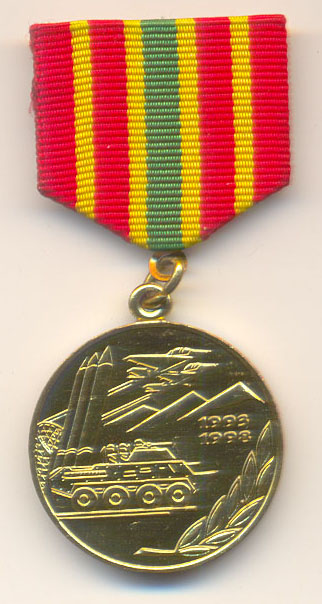
Medal "5 Years of the Tajik Armed Forces

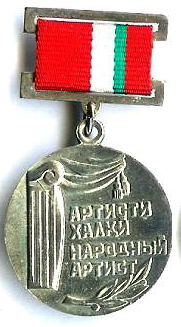
People's Artist of the Tajik SSR Medal

Order of Glory

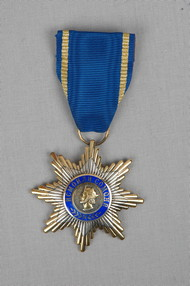
Order of Ismoili Somoni
