= Order of Spitamen =

Awarded by President of Tajikistan
- Established: 16 December 1996; 31 July 2001 (reestablished)
- Status: Currently constituted

Precedence
- Next (higher): Order of Friendship
- Next (lower): Order of Glory
- Ribbon of the order

The Order of Spitamen (Tajik: Ордени Спитамен) is an order and decoration of the Republic of Tajikistan. It is awarded to members of the Tajikistani Armed Forces, the Police of Tajikistan, the Ministry of Internal Affairs and security structures for special feats. It is named Spitamenes, the leader of the uprising in Sogdiana and Bactria against Alexander the Great, King of Macedon, in 329 BC. The Order of Spitamen is worn on the left side of the chest with a ribbon.

== Degrees ==
The Order of Spitamen has the following ranks:

- 1st Degree - Awarded for achievements in leading and managing personnel.
- 2nd Degree - Awarded for feats in the fight against crime, in emergency situations, and during the performance of military and service duty.

== Recipients ==
- Rajan Batyrkhanov
- Rajabali Rahmonali (1997)
- Ghaffor Mirzoyev (1997, stripped in 2006)
- Oleg Zakharchenko
- Emomali Sobirzoda (2009)
- Sherali Mirzo
- Saimumin Yatimov
- Ramazon Rahimov
