= Saidullo Khairullaev =

Tajik politician (born 1977)

- Файзалӣ Идизода
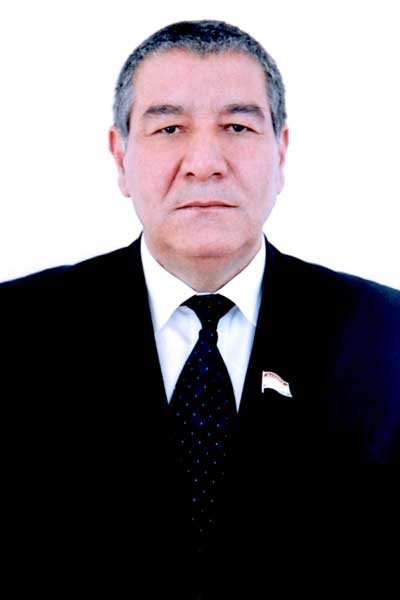

Chairman of the Assembly of Representatives of Tajikistan
- In office March 27, 2000 – April 23, 2010
- Preceded by: Position established
- Succeeded by: Shukurjon Zuhurov

Personal details
- Born: Saidullo Khairulloevich Khairulloev; August 10, 1945 (age 80) Dekhi-Mullobadal, Gharm District, Tajik SSR, Soviet Union
- Party: People's Democratic Party

Saidullo Khairulloevich Khairulloev (Tajik: Сайдулло Хайруллоевич Хайруллоев, born August 10, 1945) is a politician from Tajikistan who was the first Chairman of Assembly of Representatives of Tajikistan from 2000 to 2010.

== Early life and career ==
He was born in the village of Dekhi-Mullobadal in the Gharm District. He graduated from the Tajik Agricultural Institute in 1969. He worked as an engineer from 1969 to 1977. In 197, he became Deputy Chairman of the Garm District Executive Committee. From 1977 to 1979, he was a student of the Tashkent Higher Party School. From 1979 to 1985, he served as Chairman of the Gharm District Executive Committee. From 1990 to 1991, he was Chairman of the Kurgan-Tyube Regional Executive Committee.

From 1991 to 2000, he worked in the government of the Tajik Soviet Socialist Republic and the Republic of Tajikistan, such as Deputy Chairman of the Council of Ministers, Deputy Prime Minister of the Tajik SSR, Minister of Nature Protection, Chairman of the Committee on Precious Metals and Gemstones, and Chairman of the Committee on Land Management and Land Reform.

== Parliamentary career ==
In 1995, he began his parliamentary career and was elected to the first convocation of the Supreme Assembly from the 36th Navobod district. He is a member of the Majlisi Oli Committee on Legislation and Human Rights.

After the switch to bicameralism in 2000 he was elected as a deputy of the Assembly of Representatives of Tajikistan of the second convocation from the Garm electoral district No. 12, and in March 2000 he was appointed chairman of the chamber. In 2005, he was reelected as a deputy of the Assembly of Representatives of Tajikistan of the third convocation, and re-elected as chairman. In 2010, he refused to run for election in Assembly of Representatives.

In 2010, he was elected as a National Assembly of Tajikistan. Since November 2010, he has been the Chairman of the Presidium of the Tajik Society of Friendship and Cultural Relations with Foreign Countries (TSFCR).

== Awards ==
- Order of Ismoili Somoni, 1st degree (September 5, 2006)
- Order of the Commonwealth (March 25, 2002)
- Order of Glory
- Order of the Badge of Honor (1981)
- Order of the Red Banner of Labor (1989)
- Order of Glory (Afghanistan) (1989)
- Honored Worker of Tajikistan (September 4, 1998, No. 1059)
- Medal "20th Anniversary of Independence of the Republic of Tajikistan" (August 6, 2011, No. 1130)
- Gold Medal "For Strengthening Peace and Harmony between Nations" of the International Federation for Peace and Harmony of the Russian Federation (2011)
- Gold Medal of the CIS Interparliamentary Assembly (March 27, 2012)
- Medal in honor of the "10th anniversary of the Parliament of Kazakhstan" (2006)
- Medal in honor of the 10th anniversary of the Drug Control Agency under the President of the Republic of Tajikistan (May 27, 2009)
- Medal in honor of the "85th anniversary of the Tajik police" (January 29, 2010)
- Medal in honor of the "15th anniversary of the Armed Forces of Tajikistan"
- Medal "15th Anniversary of the Federation Council" (September 13, 2008)
- Medal "In Memory of the 300th Anniversary of St. Petersburg" (July 3, 2003)
- Medal "IPA CIS. 25 years" (March 27, 2017, Interparliamentary Assembly of the CIS)
