= Order of Glory (disambiguation) =

The Order of Glory was a Soviet military decoration established in 1943.

Order of Glory or Glory Order may also refer to

== Order of Glory ==
- Order of Glory (Afghanistan)
- Order of Glory (Armenia)
- Order of Glory (Azerbaijan)
- Order of Military Glory (Belarus)
- Order of Glory (Kazakhstan); see Orders, decorations, and medals of Kazakhstan
- Order of Glory (Ottoman Empire)
- Order of Glory (Tajikistan)
- Order of Glory (Tunisia)

== See also ==
- Order of Honor and Glory; see Orders, decorations and medals of Abkhazia § Orders
- Order of Labour Glory
- Order of Maternal Glory
