= Alpha Group (disambiguation) =

Alpha Group is a Soviet and, later, Russian special operations forces unit.

Alpha Group name can also refer to:

== Military units ==
- Alpha Group (Belarus), a Belarusian special operations forces unit
- Alpha Group (Tajikistan), a Tajik special forces unit
- Alpha Group (Ukraine), a Ukrainian special operations forces unit

== Companies ==
- Alpha Group Co., a Chinese animation and toy company
