= Rajabali Rahmonali =

- Раджабали Рахмонали
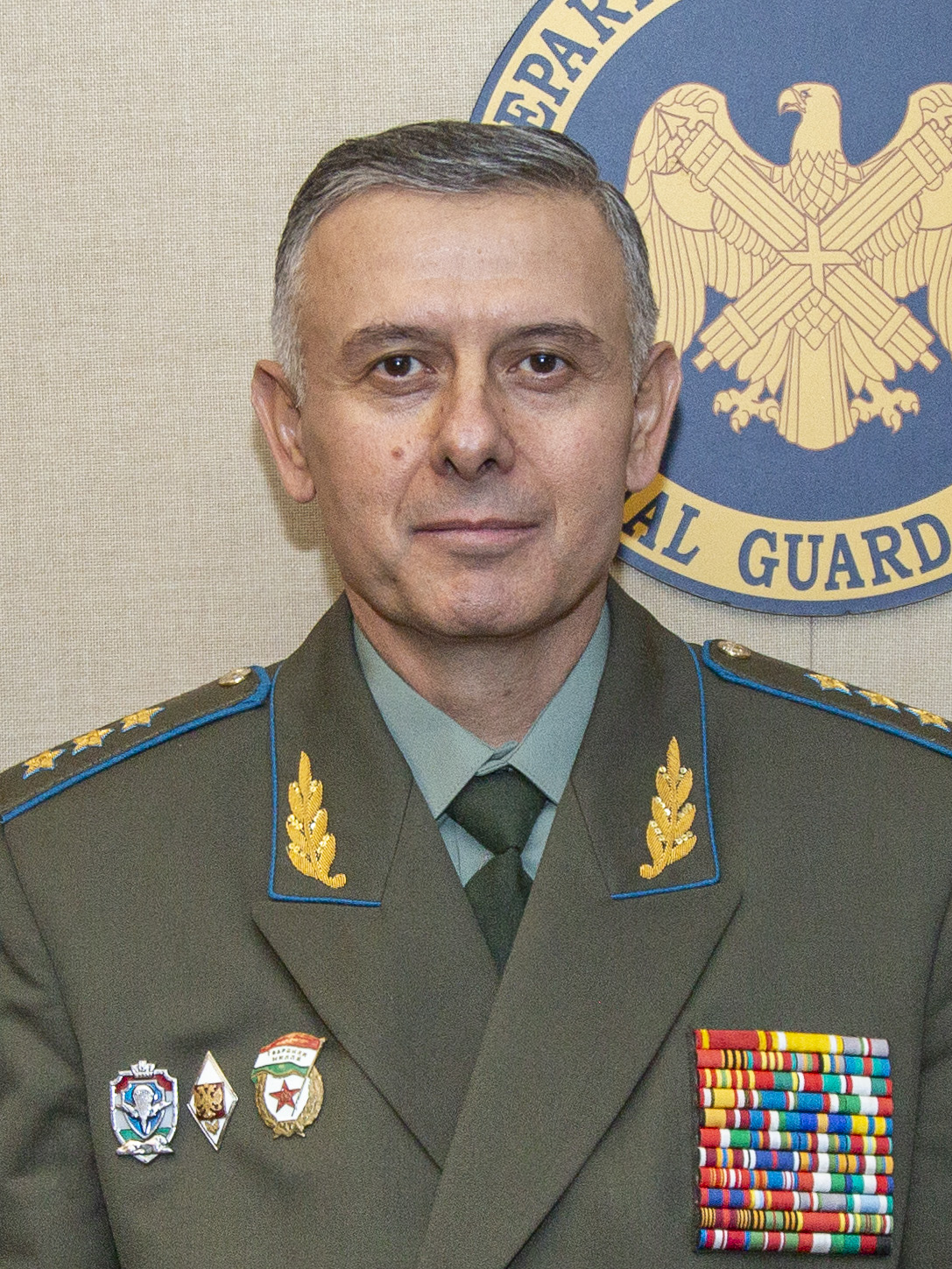
- Rahmonali in September 2023

Chairman of the Committee of Emergency Situations and Civil Defense of Tajikistan
- Incumbent
- Assumed office 21 January 2025
- President: Emomali Rahmon
- Preceded by: Rustam Nazarzoda

Personal details
- Born: 7 October 1967 (age 58) Danghara, Tajik SSR, USSR

Military service
- Allegiance: Tajikistan
- Branch/service: Armed Forces of Tajikistan
- Service years: 1992–present
- Rank: Lieutenant General (since February 21, 2018)
- Battles/wars: Tajikistani Civil War

Colonel General Rajabali Rahmonali (Tajik: Раджабали Рахмонали; born 7 October 1967), born as Rajabali Fayzalievich Rakhmonaliev is a military leader in the armed forces of Tajikistan. Since 21 January 2025, he has been the Chairman of the Committee of Emergency Situations and Civil Defense of Tajikistan.

== Career ==
He was born on 7 October 1967 in Danghara, a town in the Khatlon Region of the Tajik SSR and the capital of the Danghara District. In 1989, he graduated from the Tallinn Higher Military-Political Construction School, majoring in military-political specialization. From August 1989 to March 1992, he served as an officer in the ranks of the Soviet Army. During his service, he was based in Chelyabinsk and the Kazakh SSR.

In March 1992, he joined the Tajik National Army, serving in the Ministry of Defense in the positions of deputy military commissar. During the Tajikistani Civil War, he served in a detachment in the Popular Front of Tajikistan. He was one of the leaders of the liberation of Dushanbe. In 1997, he became the commander of the 7th Airborne Assault Brigade. In 2004 he graduated from the Combined Arms Academy of the Armed Forces of the Russian Federation with a degree in Combined Arms Units and Formations Management. In January 2004, he became Commander of the National Guard, replacing Ghaffor Mirzoyev. On 20 November 2013, he was appointed First Deputy Chairman of the State Committee for National Security, which concurrently comes with the posts of Head of the Main Directorate of the Border Troops and Commander of the Border Troops of the SCNS. On 21 January 2025, he was appointed Chairman of the Committee of Emergency Situations and Civil Defense under the Government of the Republic of Tajikistan.

== Personal life ==
He is married with five children. He is a nephew of President Emomali Rahmon, In 2020, he was infected with COVID-19, and was hospitalized with pneumonia.

== Awards ==
He holds the following state awards:

- Order of Spitamen (1997)
- Order of Glory (1999)
- Order of the Crown, 2nd Degree (2013)
