= Rafiqa Musoeva =

Politician from Tajikistan

Rafiqa Musoeva (born 1953) is a Tajikistani politician whose career began during the Soviet era.

Museova is from Khujand, and was one of four children in her family. She received a degree in engineering from the Moscow Institute of Engineers of Civil Aviation in 1979, whereupon she became a lecturer at the Tajik Polytechnic Institute. In 1980 she received an appointment as Secretary of the Central Committee of the Komsomol of the Tajik SSR; in 1987 she became First Secretary of the Central District of the Dushanbe CPT Committee. In 1989 she was first elected to the Supreme Soviet of the Tajik SSR, being elected to its successor, the Supreme Assembly, in 1994. She was part of the working group tasked with drafting the new constitution of Tajikistan after the country declared its independence from the Soviet Union in 1991. In 1994 she took the chairmanship of the State Building Committee of the Majlisi Oli. She served as minister of labor and social protection from January 2000 to January 2003. Musoeva later went on to chair the Tajik Energy Workers' Association. In 2012 she was named director of the Dushanbe Plaza state business center by Dushanbe mayor Mahmadsaid Ubaydulloyev; he removed her from the post in 2015. She has two children, a son and a daughter.
