= 7th Airborne Assault Brigade =

- Бригадаи 7-уми ҳамла ба десанти Тоҷикистон
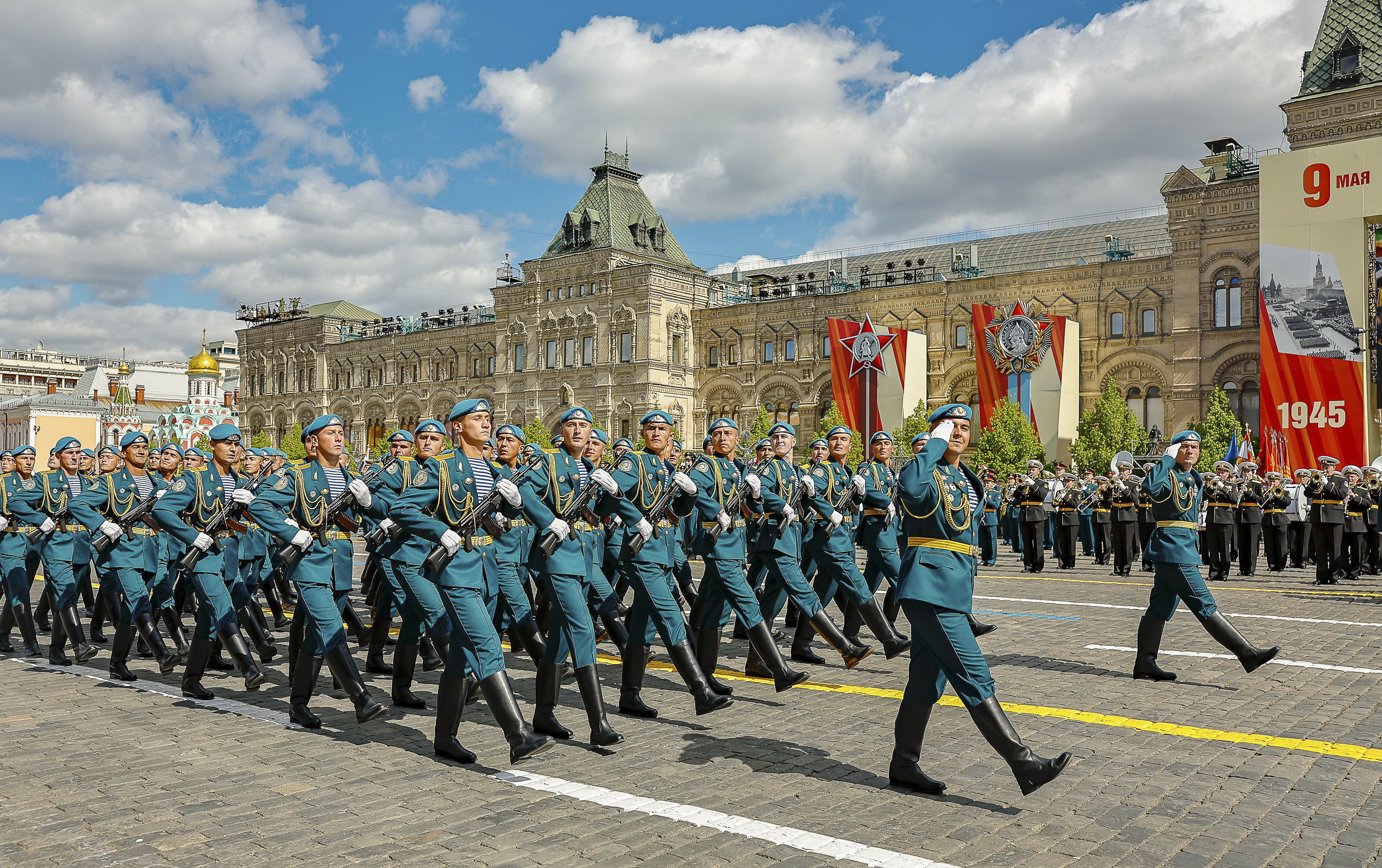
- Troops of the brigade during the 2025 Moscow Victory Day Parade.
- Founded: 2 August 1997
- Country: Tajikistan
- Branch: Tajik Mobile Forces
- Type: Paratroopers
- Role: Counterterrorism, special forces
- Headquarters: Dushanbe
- Equipment: Dongfeng EQ2050

Commanders
- Notable commanders: Rajabali Rakhmonaliev

The 7th Airborne Assault Brigade (Tajik: Бригадаи 7-уми ҳамла ба десанти) is a paratrooper unit of the Tajik Mobile Forces. The Mobile Forces act as the special forces of Tajikistan, under the Defense Ministry. Located in Dushanbe, it forms the backbone of the mobile forces.

The brigade is also one of the most combat ready forces in the Tajik Armed Forces.

== History ==
During the Tajik civil war, special forces units were formed in addition to the regular army. The first of these units that appeared in Tajikistan was the special forces company of the National Security Committee (the former KGB of the Tajik Soviet Socialist Republic), which was formed in 1991. It was later reorganized into a battalion. As the armed conflict began, it was expanded into a battalion as a practicality. On 2 August 1997, this battalion was transformed into the 7th Airborne Assault Battalion. 12 graduates of the Ryazan Higher Airborne Command School formed the basis of the battalion's officer corps, with Rajabali Rakhmonaliev (a graduate of the Tallinn Higher Military-Political Construction School) being appointed commander. In 1999, the battalion was transformed into an airborne assault brigade, becoming the reserve of the Supreme Commander (President of Tajikistan).

About half of the brigade's officer corps, served during the Civil War. In particular, the unit was sent to Khujand to battle against the forces of Colonel Mahmud Khudoiberdiyev, freeing hostages and stopping the mutiny after four days of fighting.

== Modern era ==
Currently, the brigade is part of the Collective Rapid Reaction Forces of the CSTO, during which they take part in exercises with the Russian Airborne Forces, the Special Forces of Belarus, and the Special Forces of the Kyrgyz Army, among others.

Every year, brigade fighters take part in military exercises held in a field training center located a couple of kilometers from Dushanbe. In addition, the brigade's fighters also are trained extensively in hand-to-hand combat. The average age of women serving in the brigade, of which there is just twenty, is 20–30 years old. The positions they hold, include that of snipers, shooters and sappers, one of the few Central Asian nations to have that arrangement.

On the occasion of the 25th anniversary of the establishment of the brigade, President Emomali Rahmon visited them in the Khuroson District in the Khatlon Region, calling Tajik paratroopers "one of the important structures of the Armed Forces of Tajikistan born from the era of independence of our country and a reliable shield of the new statehood of Tajiks." More than 95% of the brigade's officers are graduates of Tajik and foreign military institutions and more than 40 brigade personnel have been awarded state awards.

In 2025, troops from the brigade took part in Victory Day Parades on Moscow's Red Square and Minsk's Victors Avenue.

== Equipment ==
=== Vehicles ===
- BM-27 Uragan
- TOS-1A
- Dongfeng EQ2050

=== Aircraft ===
- MI-8
- MI-24
- L-39
- AN-2

== Commanders ==
- Rajabali Rakhmonaliev (1997-January 2004)
- Bobodzhon Dzhamolzoda (?)
- Tokhir Khayrulloyev (January 2007-?)
- Colonel Abdulmumin Asozoda (?-present)
