= Yuri Ponosov =

Soviet politician (1941–2024)

- Юрий Поносов

First Deputy Prime Minister of Tajikistan
- In office 28 March 1996 – 18 February 1998
- President: Emomali Rahmon
- Prime Minister: Yahyo Azimov
- Preceded by: Mahmadsaid Ubaydulloyev
- Succeeded by: Haji Akbar Turajanzade

Mayor of Dushanbe
- In office 1994–1996
- Preceded by: Jamoliddin Mansurov
- Succeeded by: Mahmadsaid Ubaydulloyev
Additional positions
Head of the Department of Rosstroy
In office
1998–2001
Minister of Construction of the Tajik Soviet Socialist Republic
In office
1990–1992
First Deputy Chairman of the Dushanbe City Executive Committee
In office
1988–1990
Second Secretary of the Gorno-Badakhshan Regional Committee of the Communist Party of Tajikistan
In office
1985–1988
First Secretary of the Kulob City Committee of the Communist Party of Tajikistan
In office
1983–1985
Second Secretary of the Ordzhonikidzeabad District Committee of the Communist Party of Tajikistan
In office
1975–1982

Personal details
- Born: Yuri Filimonovich Ponosov; 24 March 1941 Urulga, Karymsky District, Chita Oblast, Russian SFSR, USSR
- Died: 20 April 2024 (aged 83) Moscow, Russia
- Party: PDP
- Other political affiliations: CPSU (1967–1991); CPT (1967–1991)
- Education: Tashkent Institute of Railway Transport Engineers
- Awards: Order of the Badge of Honour

Military service
- Allegiance: Soviet Union; Tajikistan
- Branch/service: Soviet Army
- Years of service: 1963–1966

Yuri Filimonovich Ponosov (Tajik/Russian: Юрий Филимонович Поносов; 24 March 1941 – 20 April 2024) was a Tajikistani of Russian descent who was a Soviet politician.

== Early life and education ==
Ponosov was born to a working-class family in the Russian Soviet Federative Socialist Republic in 1941. He graduated from a college in Chita in 1961 and later graduated from the Tashkent Institute of Railway Transport Engineers in the Uzbek SSR in 1974.

== Career ==
From 1961 to 1962, Ponosov worked as a machine operator of a construction department in the Tajik SSR. He then became a mechanic of a house building plant in the Ordzhonikidzeabad District (now Vahdat District) in the Tajik SSR. He served in the Soviet Ground Forces from 1963 to 1966. In 1966, he became the chief technologist of the same house building plant and was promoted to Deputy Director of the plant in 1972.

Ponosov joined the Communist Party of the Soviet Union in 1967. From 1973 to 1975, Ponosov served as the Deputy Chairman of the Ordzhonikidzeabad District Executive Committee. From 1975 to 1982, he served as the Second Secretary of the Ordzhonikidzeabad District Committee of the Communist Party of Tajikistan; the Tajik SSR branch of the Communist Party of the Soviet Union. He served as the Head of the Department of Organization and Party Work for the Kulob City Committee of the Communist Party of Tajikistan. From 1983 to 1985, he served as the First Secretary of the Kulob City Committee of the Communist Party of Tajikistan. He served as the Second Secretary of the Gorno-Badakhshan Regional Committee of the Communist Party of Tajikistan from 1985 to 1988. He served as the First Deputy Chairman of the Dushanbe City Executive Committee from 1988 to 1990. He was also appointed to the post of Minister of Construction of the Tajik SSR in 1990. He retained his post of Minister of Construction after the dissolution of the Soviet Union although the ministry was dissolved by the Supreme Soviet of the Tajik SSR in 1992. Ponosov was the third mayor of Dushanbe and served from 1994 to 1996. He assumed the position of First Deputy Prime Minister of Tajikistan on 28 March 1996, but was relieved on 18 February 1998 and left for Moscow. He served as the Head of the Department of Rosstroy of Russia from 1998 to 2001.

== Personal life and death ==
Ponosov lived in Russia from 1998. He died on 20 April 2024, at the age of 83.

== Awards ==
- (Soviet Union) Order of the Badge of Honour

== See also ==
- Politics of Tajikistan
- Politics of the Soviet Union
