= List of international prime ministerial trips made by Mikhail Mishustin =

This is a list of prime ministerial trips made by Mikhail Mishustin, during his premiership, which began on 16 January 2020.

== Summary ==
As of June 2026, the number of visits per country where Mishustin travelled are:

- One visit: Greece, United Arab Emirates, Iran, Pakistan, Vietnam, and Brazil.
- Two visits: Tajikistan, and Turkmenistan.
- Three visits: Azerbaijan, China, and Uzbekistan.
- Four visits: Armenia, Kyrgyzstan.
- Five or more visits: Kazakhstan, and Belarus.

== List ==
=== 2020 ===
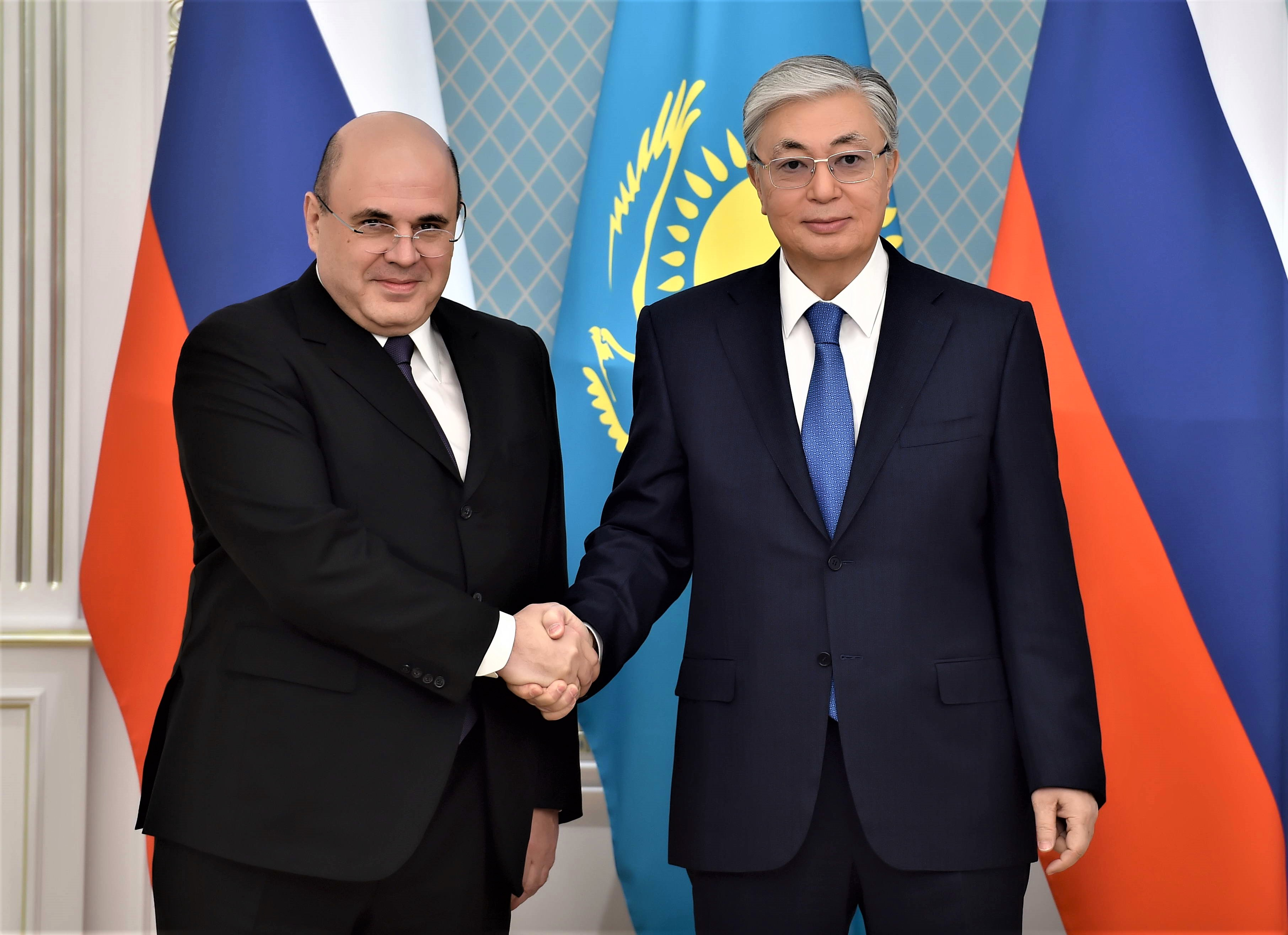
Mishustin with President of Kazakhstan Kassym-Jomart Tokayev in Nur-Sultan, on 1 February 2020

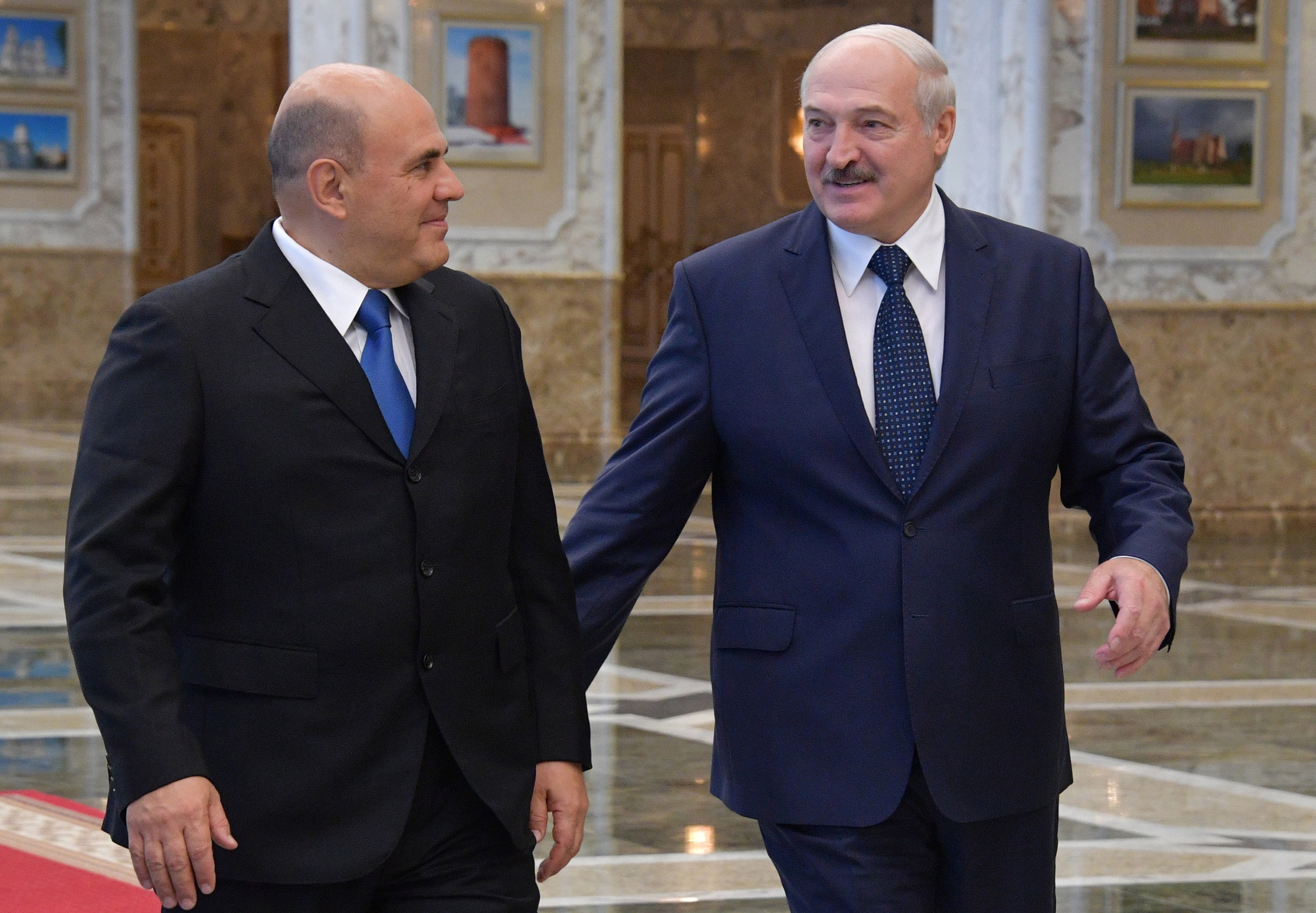
Mishustin with President of Belarus Alexander Lukashenko, in Minsk, on 3 September 2020

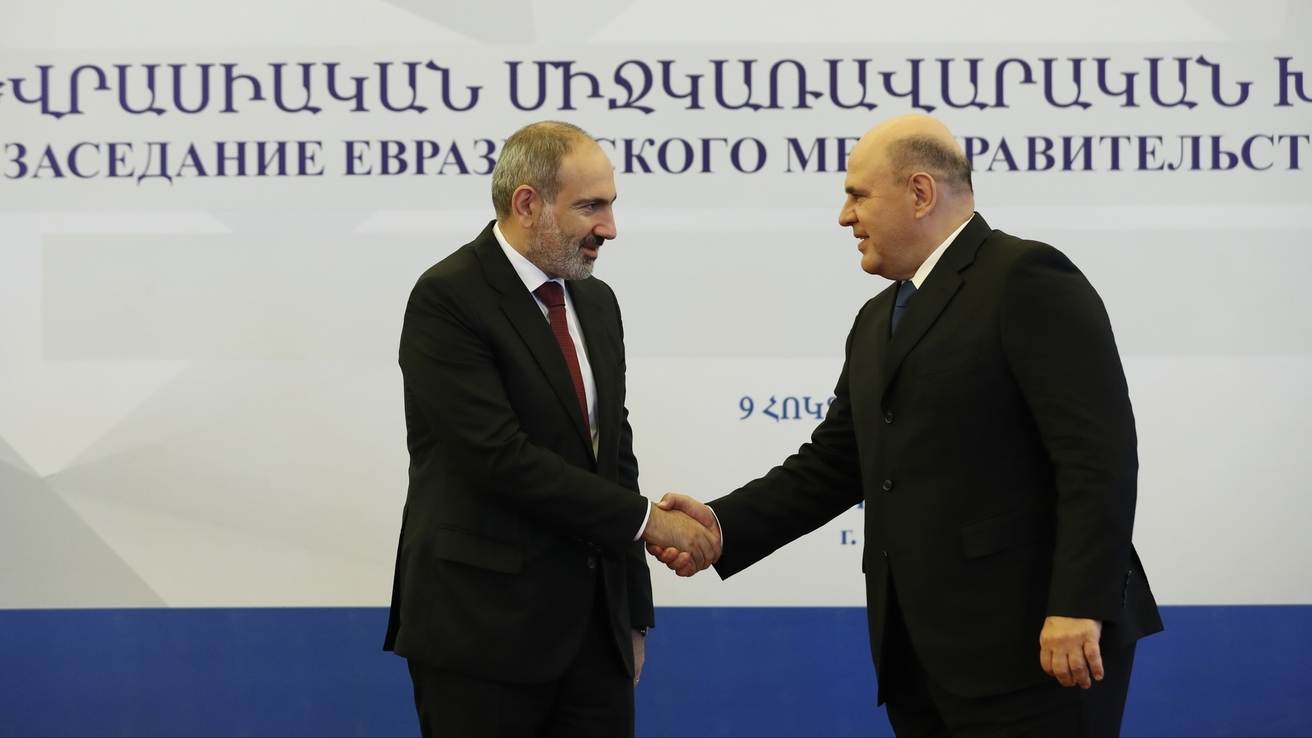
Mishustin with Prime Minister of Armenia Nikol Pashinyan, in Yerevan, on 9 October 2020

Country	Areas visited	Date(s)	Notes
Kazakhstan	Almaty, Nur-Sultan	30 January – 1 February	Working visit, participation in the session of the Eurasian Intergovernmental Council.
Belarus	Minsk	17 July 2020	Working visit, participation in the session of the Eurasian Intergovernmental Council.
Belarus	Minsk	3 September	Working visit, meeting with Belarusian President Alexander Lukashenko and Prime Minister Roman Golovchenko.
Armenia	Yerevan	9 October	Working visit, participation in the session of the Eurasian Intergovernmental Council.

=== 2021 ===
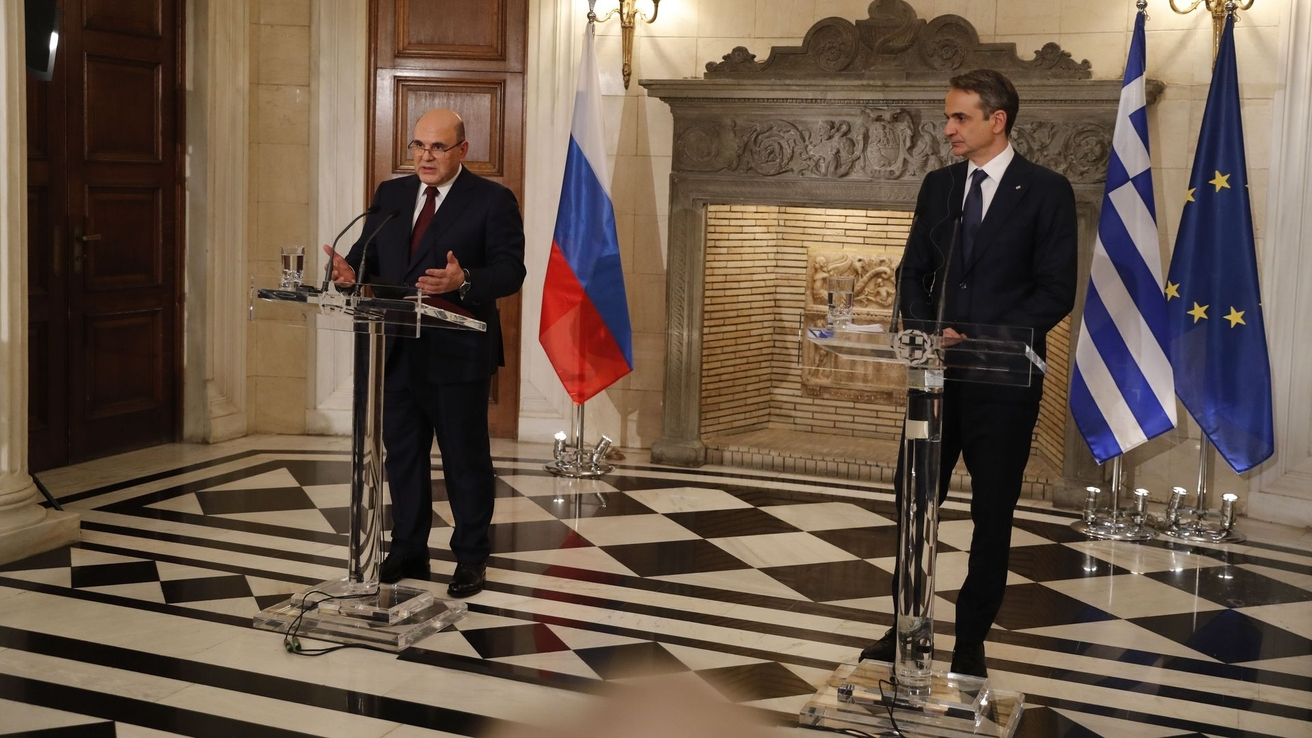
Mishustin with Prime Minister of Greece Kyriakos Mitsotakis, in Athens, on 24 March 2021

Country	Areas visited	Date(s)	Notes
Kazakhstan	Almaty	4–5 February	Working visit, participation in the session of the Eurasian Intergovernmental Council.
Greece	Athens	24–26 March	Working visit, represented Russia at the bicentennial celebrations of the Greek War of Independence.
Belarus	Minsk	16 April	Working visit, meeting with Belarusian President Alexander Lukashenko and Prime Minister Roman Golovchenko.
Belarus	Minsk	27–28 May	Working visit, participation in the session of the CIS Council of the heads of government.
Kazakhstan	Nur-Sultan	18–19 August	Working visit, meeting with Kazakh President Kassym-Jomart Tokayev, former President Nursultan Nazarbayev and Prime Minister Asqar Mamin.
Kyrgyzstan	Cholpon-Ata	19–20 August	Working visit, participation in the session of the Eurasian Intergovernmental Council.
Belarus	Minsk	10 September	Working visit, participation in the session of the Union State Council of Ministers.
Armenia	Yerevan	18–19 November	Working visit, participation in the session of the Eurasian Intergovernmental Council.
United Arab Emirates	Dubai	4 December	Working visit, participation in the opening ceremony of the National Day of Russia at Expo 2020.

=== 2022 ===
Country	Areas visited	Date(s)	Notes
Kazakhstan	Nur-Sultan	24–25 February	Working visit, participation in the session of the Eurasian Intergovernmental Council.
Belarus	Minsk	20–21 June	Working visit, participation in the session of the Eurasian Intergovernmental Council.
Kyrgyzstan	Cholpon-Ata	25–26 August	Working visit, participation in the session of the Eurasian Intergovernmental Council.
Armenia	Yerevan	20–21 October	Working visit, participation in the session of the Eurasian Intergovernmental Council.
Kazakhstan	Astana	27–28 October	Working visit, participation in the session of the CIS Council of the heads of government.
Azerbaijan	Baku	17–18 November	Working visit, meeting with Azerbaijani President Ilham Aliyev and Prime Minister Ali Asadov.
Uzbekistan	Samarkand	1–2 December	Working visit, meeting with Uzbek Prime Minister Abdulla Aripov, participation in the Russian-Uzbek Business Forum.

=== 2023 ===
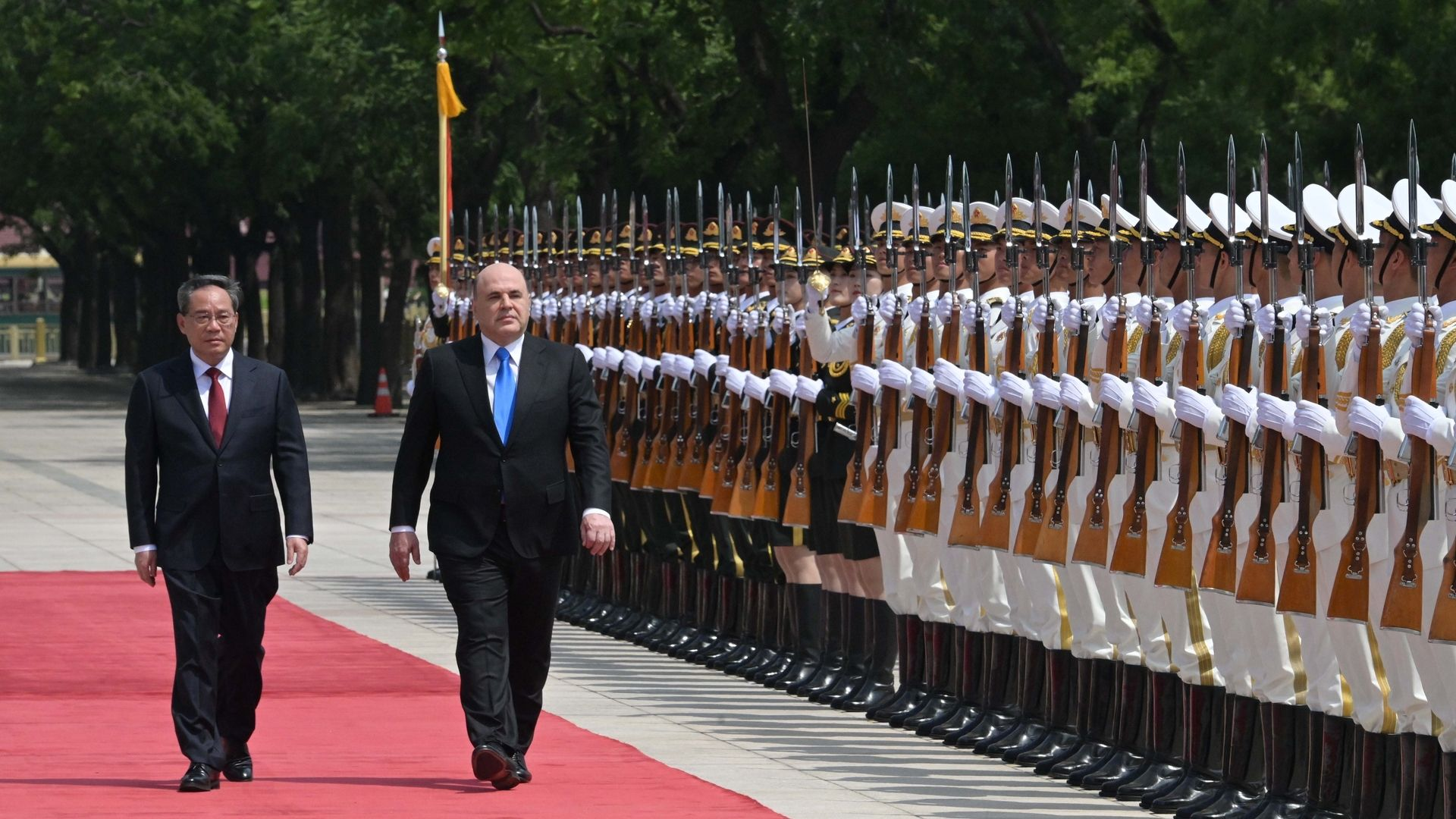
Mishustin with Premier of China Li Qiang, in Beijing, on 24 May 2023

Country	Areas visited	Date(s)	Notes
Turkmenistan	Ashgabat	19–20 January	Working visit, meeting with Turkmen President Serdar Berdimuhamedow and former President Gurbanguly Berdimuhamedow, participation in the Russian-Turkmen Business Forum.
Kazakhstan	Almaty	2–3 February	Working visit, participation in the session of the Eurasian Intergovernmental Council.
Tajikistan	Dushanbe	2–3 March	Working visit, meeting with Tajik President Emomali Rahmon, Prime Minister Kokhir Rasulzoda and Majlisi Milli Chairman Rustam Emomali.
China	Shanghai; Beijing	23–24 May	Working visit, meeting with Chinese President Xi Jinping, Prime Minister Li Qiang and New Development Bank Chair Dilma Rousseff, participation in the Russian–Chinese Business Forum.
Armenia	Tsaghkadzor	24 August 2023	Working visit, participation in the session of the Eurasian Intergovernmental Council.
Kazakhstan	Astana	24–25 September	Working visit, participation in the Innoprom.Kazakhstan exhibition.
Kyrgyzstan	Bishkek	25–26 October	Working visit, participation in the sessions of the Eurasian Intergovernmental Council, the CIS Council of the heads of government and the SCO Council of the heads of government.
China	Beijing	19–20 December	Working visit, meeting with Chinese President Xi Jinping and Prime Minister Li Qiang.

=== 2024 ===
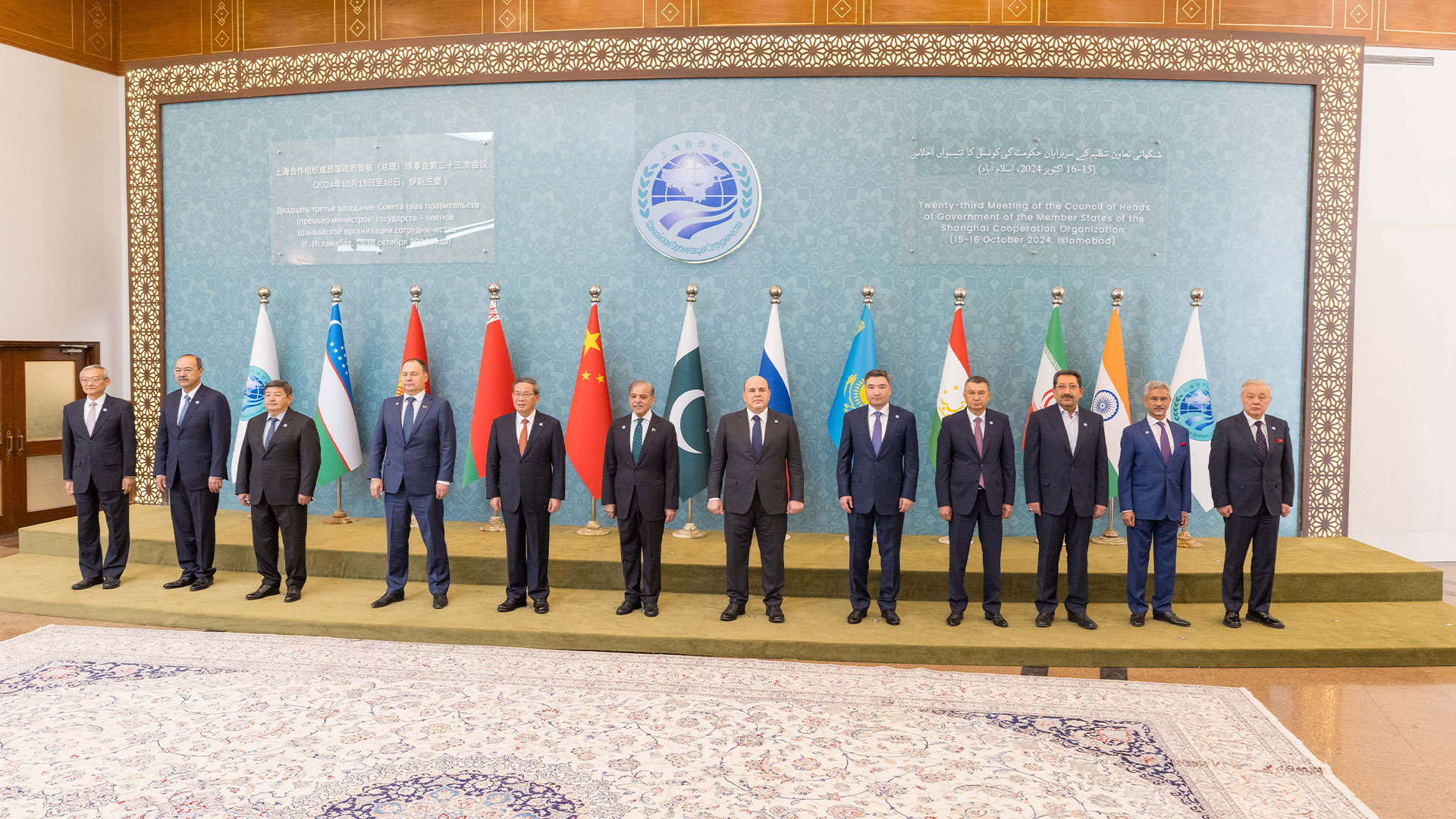
Mishustin at 2024 Islamabad SCO summit

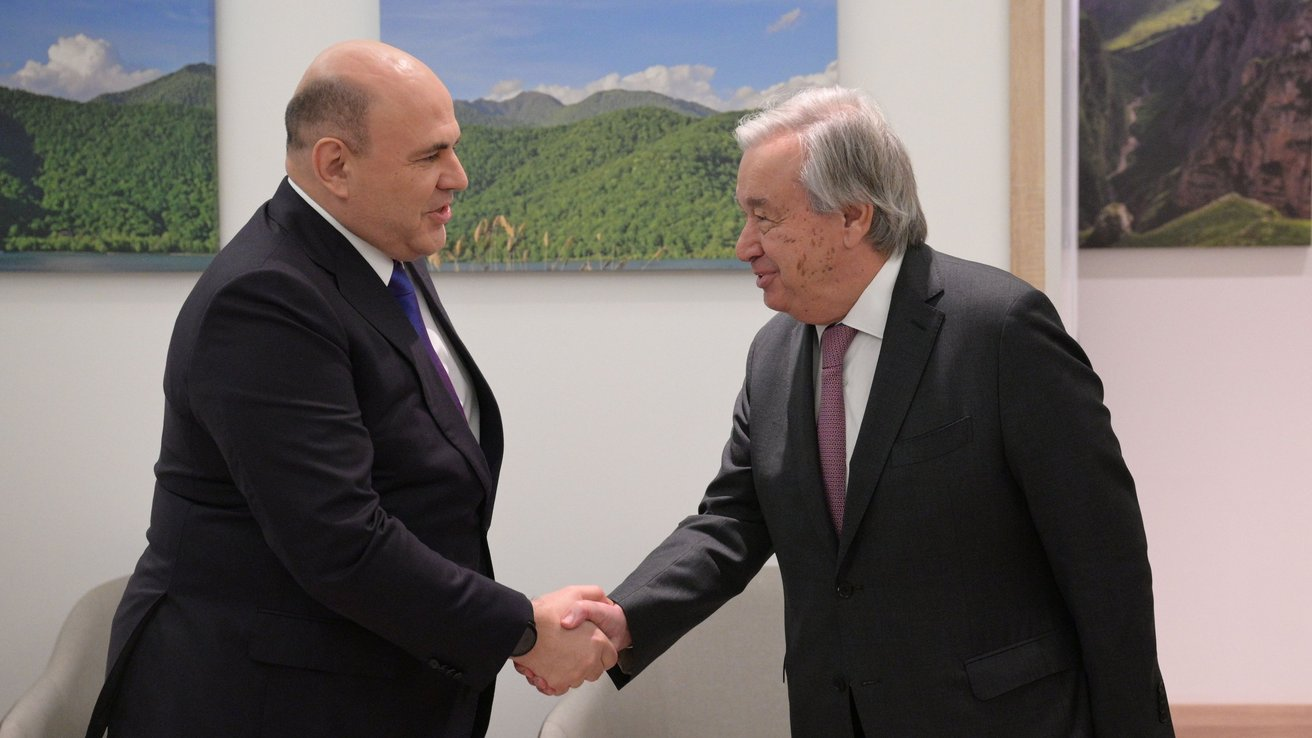
Mishustin with UN Secretary General António Guterres, during the 2024 UN Climate Change Conference in Baku, on 13 November 2024

Country	Areas visited	Date(s)	Notes
Kazakhstan	Almaty	1–2 February	Working visit, participation in the session of the Eurasian Intergovernmental Council.
Azerbaijan	Baku	5–6 March	Working visit, meeting with Azerbaijani President Ilham Aliyev and Prime Minister Ali Asadov.
Turkmenistan	Ashgabat	24 May	Working visit, participation in the session of the CIS Council of the heads of government.
Belarus	Minsk Oblast	3–4 June	Working visit, participation in the session of the Eurasian Intergovernmental Council.
Uzbekistan	Tashkent	9–10 September	Working visit, meeting with Uzbek President Shavkat Mirziyoyev and Prime Minister Abdulla Aripov.
Iran	Tehran	30 September	Official visit, meeting with Iranian President Masoud Pezeshkian and Vice President Mohammad Reza Aref.
Armenia	Yerevan	30 September – 1 October	Working visit, participation in the session of the Eurasian Intergovernmental Council.
Pakistan	Islamabad	15–16 October	First Prime Minister of Russia to visit Pakistan, since 2007. Attended 2024 Islamabad SCO summit. Held a delegation level meeting with the Prime Minister of Pakistan Shehbaz Sharif. Also met Premier of China Li Qiang and Prime Minister of Mongolia Luvsannamsrain Oyun-Erdene.
Belarus	Minsk	5 November	Working visit, participation in the session of the Union State Council of Ministers.
Azerbaijan	Baku	13 November	Working visit, participation in the 2024 United Nations Climate Change Conference.
Belarus	Minsk	6 December	Working visit, participation in the session of the Union State Supreme State Council.

=== 2025 ===
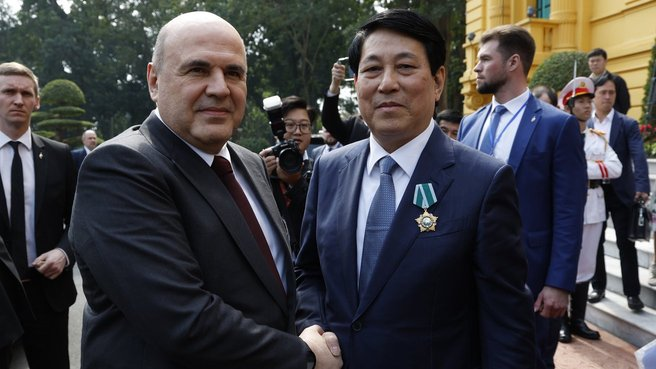
Mishustin with President of Vietnam Lương Cường, on 14 January 2025

Country	Areas visited	Date(s)	Notes
Vietnam	Hanoi	14–15 January	Official visit, meeting with Vietnamese President Lương Cường, Prime Minister Phạm Minh Chính, National Assembly Chairman Trần Thanh Mẫn and Communist Party General Secretary Tô Lâm.
Kazakhstan	Astana, Almaty	29–30 January	Working visit, participation in the session of the Eurasian Intergovernmental Council, speech at the Digital Almaty 2025 Forum.
Tajikistan	Dushanbe	4–5 June	Working visit, participation in the session of the CIS Council of the heads of government.
Kyrgyzstan	Cholpon-Ata	14–15 August	Oficial visit, participation in the session of the Eurasian Intergovernmental Council.
Belarus	Minsk	29–30 September	Working visit, participation in the sessions of the Eurasian Intergovernmental Council and the CIS Council of the heads of government.
China	Hangzhou	3–4 November	Working visit, meeting with Chinese President Xi Jinping and Prime Minister Li Qiang.

=== 2026 ===
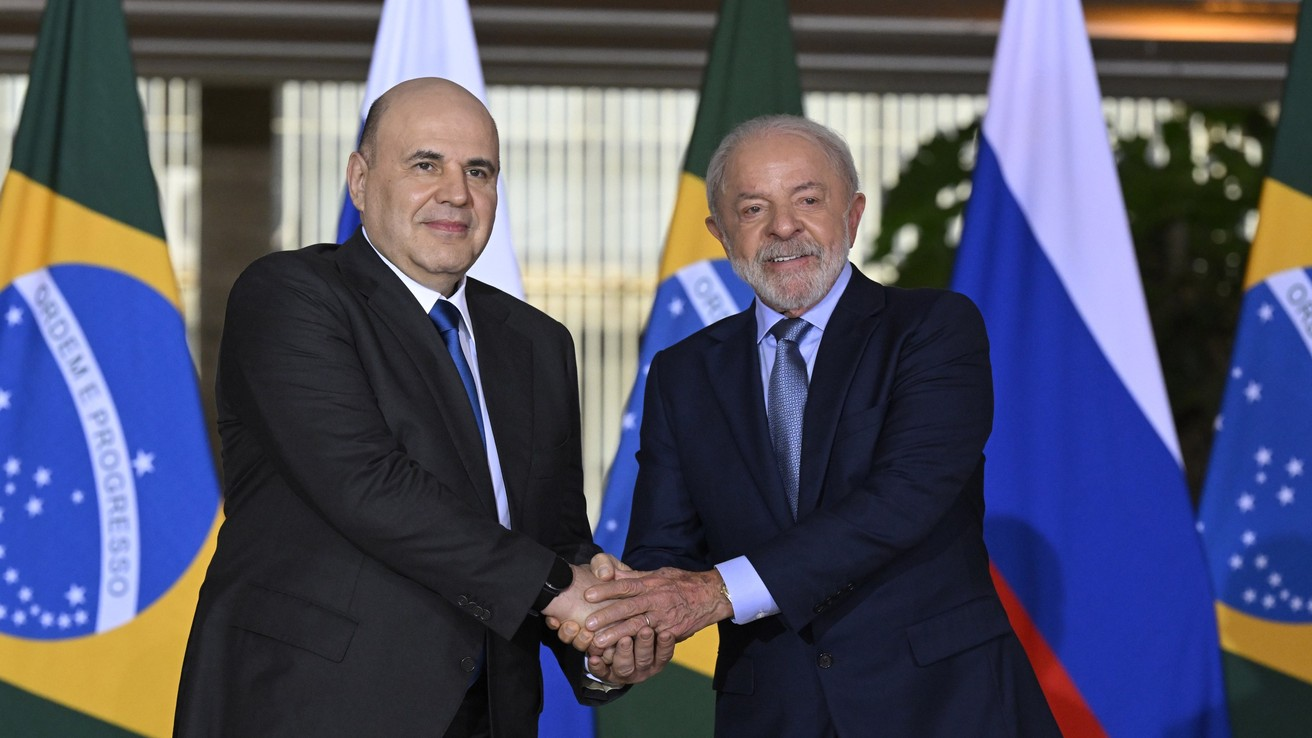
Mishustin with President of Brazil Luiz Inácio Lula da Silva, on 5 February 2026

Country	Areas visited	Date(s)	Notes
Brazil	Brasília	5 February	Official visit, meeting with Brazilian President Luiz Inácio Lula da Silva, Vice President Geraldo Alckmin, participation in the meeting of the Russian-Brazilian High-level Commission on Cooperation and opening of the Russian-Brazilian Business Forum.
Kazakhstan	Astana, Shymkent	25–27 March	Working visit, including Russian-Kazakh government talks with Prime Minister Olzhas Bektenov, a meeting with President Kassym-Jomart Tokayev, participation in meetings of the Eurasian Intergovernmental Council, and participation in the Digital Qazaqstan 2026 international digital forum.
Uzbekistan	Tashkent	16–17 June	Working visit, including meetings with Uzbek officials and participation in the Tashkent International Investment Forum and its opening ceremony.

== See also ==
- List of international prime ministerial trips made by Vladimir Putin
- List of international prime ministerial trips made by Dmitry Medvedev
