= Saimumin Yatimov =

- Саймумин Ятимов

Head of the State Committee for National Security
- Incumbent
- Assumed office 2 September 2010
- President: Emomali Rahmon
- Preceded by: Khayriddin Abdurakhimo

Personal details
- Born: 23 July 1955 (age 71) Farkhor District, Tajik SSR, USSR
- Education: Kulyab State University
- Awards: Order of the Crown

Military service
- Rank: Lieutenant General

Saimumin Sattorovich Yatimov (Tajik: Саймумин Сатторович Ятимов; born 23 July 1955) is a senior government official in Tajikistan who has led the country's State Committee for National Security since September 2010. He holds the rank of lieutenant general and is among the 10 most influential individuals in Tajikistan.

== Early life and education ==
Yatimov was born in what is now Farkhor district in Tajikistan's southern Khatlon province. In 1976, he graduated from the State Pedagogical Institute in Kulob, Khatlon Province, with a specialist degree in Tajik language and literature. Following the graduation, he worked as a Tajik language teacher in secondary schools in Farkhor district. From 1977 to 1979, Yatimov served in the Soviet army in Kaunas, Lithuania. After competing the mandatory military service, he returned to Farkhor and worked as a secondary school teacher until 1980.

In 2001, Yatimov defended his dissertation, Foreign Policies of the Islamic Republic of Iran: Ideological Foundations, receiving an academic degree of Candidate of Sciences. One year later, he defended another dissertation, Khomeini-ism and the Ideology of the Foreign Policy of the Islamic Republic of Iran in the New System of International Relations, receiving a degree of Doctor of Sciences. In 2003, Yatimov completed his second education, graduating from the Tajik State National University with a degree in law.

== Political career ==
Between 1980 and 1992, Yatimov worked in the Farkhor district executive committee, making his way to the position of the head of a department. When the civil war began in 1992, he was appointed to head a department in the Khatlon province administration.

In 1996, Yatimov was appointed a special envoy of Tajikistan's Ministry of Foreign Affairs. There is no public information about what he was responsible for as a special envoy. Between 1997 and 2000, Yatimov served as a minister-counsellor in the Tajik embassy in Iran. He must have served there as an operative of the Tajik security services because, in 2000, he returned to Tajikistan and was appointed deputy minister of security.

In 2005, Yatimov returned to the diplomatic service when president Emomali Rahmon appointed him first deputy minister of foreign affairs. In May 2007, he was appointed Tajikistan's ambassador to Belgium and head of the country's mission to the European Union. During the period, he also served as Tajikistan's permanent delegate to UNESCO.

In 2010, Yatimov returned to work in Tajikistan's security police that had been re-branded from the Ministry for Security to the State Committee for National Security (SCNS). In May 2010, he was appointed deputy head of the SCNS. About three months later, following an escape of 25 inmates from SCNS-run detention center in Dushanbe, president Emomali Rahmon fired the head of the State Committee for National Security and appointed Yatimov as the new head of the committee on 2 September 2010. In August 2011, he was awarded the rank of lieutenant general.

== Family life ==
Yatimov is married and has five children.
