= Kulob State University =

Public university in Kŭlob, Tajikistan

The Rudaki Kulob State University is a higher education institution in the Republic of Tajikistan, located in the city of Kulob. The university was founded on July 24, 1992.

== Story ==
The university is one of the oldest universities in Tajikistan. On June 2, 1940, in accordance with Resolution No. 124 of the Council of People's Commissars of the Tajik SSR "On the Establishment of the Kulob Teacher Training Institute on the Basis of the Kulob Pedagogical College," the first university in the region was established. After the end of the Second World War, on August 15, 1945, the same resolution was adopted again to establish the Kulob Teacher Training Institute. On August 7, 1953, by the decree of the Ministry of Public Education of the USSR "On the liquidation of the Kulob Teacher Training Institute and the formation on its basis of the Pedagogical State Institute in the city of Kulob in the 1953-1954 academic year," the educational institution was renamed. On July 24, 1992, in accordance with the decree of the Council of Ministers of the Republic of Tajikistan, the institute was renamed Kulob State University. On April 24, 2009, by decree of the Government of Tajikistan, the university was renamed Kulob State University named after poet, singer, and musician Rudaki.

== Educational process ==
The university offers education in nine faculties. Its 34 departments train personnel in 42 specialties. Currently, 358 scientists and faculty members teach in the university's departments, including 11 doctors of science and 87 candidates of science. The university has its own magazine.

== Rectors ==
- Khursand Azimov (–2008)
- Karimjon Qodirov (2008–2010)
- Nurali Salikhov (2010–2012)
- Abdullo Khabibullo (2012–2020)
- Abdusalom Miralizoda (2020–2022)
- Dilshod Rahmon (10 June 2022-22 April 2025)
- Munir Vatan Safarzoda (28 May 2025)

== University structure ==
The university consists of 9 faculties:

- Faculty of Physics, Mathematics and Computer Science
- Faculty of Chemistry, Biology and Geography
- Faculty of Tajik Philology and Journalism
- Faculty of Russian Philology
- Faculty of Foreign Languages
- Faculty of History and Law
- Faculty of Physical Education
- Faculty of Economics and Management
- Faculty of Economics and Finance

== Alumni ==
- Saimumin Yatimov
- Emomali Sobirzoda
- Manija Dawlat
- Hamrokhon Zarifi
- Homiddin Sharifov

== Links ==
- Website
