= SCNS Higher School =

Coordinates: 38°32′33.1″N 68°45′54.7″E

The SCNS Higher School, officially known as the Higher School of the State Committee for National Security (Tajik: Мактаби олии Кумитаи амнияти миллии Ҷумҳурии Тоҷикистон) is a Tajik public institution under the Government of Tajikistan. Based in Dushanbe, it trains officers for the agency, which serves to maintain national security and gather intelligence for Tajikistan.

== Summary ==
The status of the institute is a higher professional school and has a state license of the Ministry of Education of Tajikistan for the right to conduct educational activities in the field of higher education and a Certificate of state accreditation.

=== Departments ===
- Department of Law

== History ==
During the Soviet era, the Higher School of KGB operated in the City of Dushanbe. In January 1993, a decision was made to establish the National Security Committee's Training Center. That September, training courses began for the first time. On 3 February 2000, the Higher School of the Ministry of Security was established by government order at the training center and the courses.

== Heads ==
- Islom Kholmurodov (2 December 2014-present)
- Mirzozoda Salomatsho Bozorboy (-December 22, 2023)
- Pirakzoda Hikmatullo (since December 22, 2023)

== See also ==
- Border Troops Academy
