= Rustam Emomali =

Tajik politician (born 1987)

- Рустам Эмомали
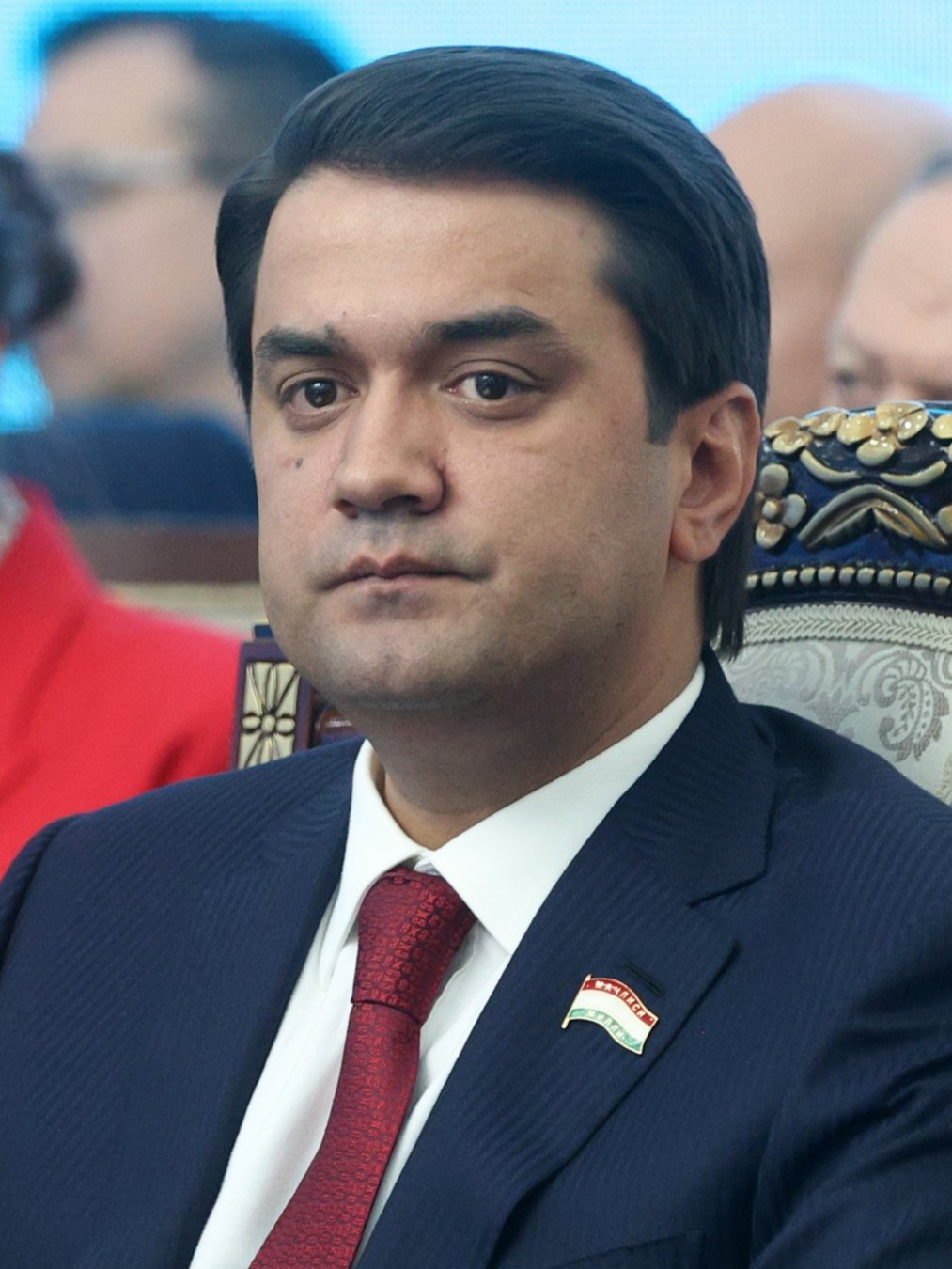
- Emomali in 2023

2nd Chairman of the National Assembly
- Incumbent
- Assumed office 17 April 2020
- Preceded by: Mahmadsaid Ubaydulloyev

Member of the National Assembly for Dushanbe
- Incumbent
- Assumed office 27 March 2020

Mayor of Dushanbe
- Incumbent
- Assumed office 12 January 2017
- Preceded by: Mahmadsaid Ubaydulloyev

President of the Central Asian Football Association
- Incumbent
- Assumed office 24 April 2019
- AFC President: Salman bin Ibrahim Al Khalifa
- Preceded by: Umid Akhmadzhanov

President of the Tajikistan Football Federation
- Incumbent
- Assumed office 5 January 2012
- Preceded by: Sukhrob Kasymov

Personal details
- Born: Рустам Эмомалиевич Раҳмонов; Rustam Emomalievich Rahmonov; 19 December 1987 (age 38) Danghara, Kulob Oblast, Tajik SSR, Soviet Union
- Citizenship: Tajikistan
- Party: People's Democratic Party
- Spouse: Fatimajon Rahmon
- Children: 3
- Parent(s): Emomali Rahmon; Azizmo Asadullayeva
- Relatives: Ozoda Rahmon (sister)
- Education: Tajik National University; RANEPA

Military service
- Allegiance: Tajikistan
- Branch/service: Armed Forces of the Republic of Tajikistan (Reserve); Customs Service of the Republic of Tajikistan
- Years of service: 2014–present
- Rank: Major general

Rustam Emomali (Note: Tajik: Рустам Эмомалӣ, romanized: Rustam Emomalī, pronounced [rʊsˈtʰam emɔmaˈli]) (born Rustam Emomalievich Rahmonov; (Note: Tajik: Рустам Эмомалиевич Раҳмонов pronounced [ɾusˈtʰam e̞mɔmaˈlije̞vitʃ ɾahˈmɔnɔv]) 19 December 1987) is a Tajik politician who is the eldest son of Emomali Rahmon, the long-standing president of Tajikistan. He has been the current Chairman of the National Assembly of Tajikistan since 2020 and Mayor of Dushanbe since 2017.

Rustam Emomali is believed to be prepared by his father to succeed him as the leader of Tajikistan; he holds the title of the constitutionally designated successor to the presidency. He heads the anti-corruption agency in Tajikistan and the state's financial oversight agency. Despite not having served in the armed forces, he holds the rank of major general. He was appointed as the mayor of Dushanbe by his father in 2017 at the age of 29.

== Early life and football career ==
Rustam Emomali was born Rustam Emomalievich Rahmonov in the district of Danghara, Kulob oblast (present-day Khatlon province) in Tajikistan, to parents Emomali Rahmon and Azizmo Asadullayeva. He graduated in 2008 from the Tajik State National University with a specialist's degree in International Economic Relations, studied a specialty in State and Municipal Administration at the Russian Presidential Academy of National Economy and Public Administration in 2011, and took courses with the Diplomatic Academy of the Russian Ministry of Foreign Affairs. In 2007, following his father's suit, he had dropped the Russian-style patronymic and last name, adopting his father's first name, Emomali, as his new surname.

In 2007, Rustam Emomali co-founded the Dushanbe-based football club Istiklol and, during the next several years, he served as the club's captain and played for it as a striker. The club has won five national championships consecutively since 2011, owing at least partially to very favorable refereeing and other preferences. In 2011, Rustam Emomali was appointed deputy president of Tajikistan's Football Federation (TFT) and joined the International Relations Committee of the Olympic Council of Asia.

In January 2012, a designated TFT pannel voted unanimously to appoint Emomali its new president for a four-year term. Following the appointment, he stopped playing for FC Istiklol and promised to cut all ties to the club. Starting in 2012, he served as a member of the FIFA Development Committee for two years. In 2016, the TFT reelected Rustam Emomali as its president for another four years.

Emomali is known for his two expensive hobbies: car racing and collecting sports cars.

He is the first recipient of "Argali Conservation Achievement Award".

== Political career ==
After graduating from the university, Rustam Emomali enjoyed rapid career growth thanks to his status as a son of the country's president. In 2006, he was appointed a leading specialist at Tajikistan's Organization for Cooperation with the World Trade Organization. In 2009, he got a job as a leading specialist in the State Committee on Investments and State Property (SCISP) and was soon promoted to the position of a head of a department in the committee. During his work in the SCISP, he also served as an adviser to the committee. Also in 2009, Rustam Emomali was appointed a deputy head of the Youth Union, the Tajik successor to the Soviet-era Komsomol organization. Starting in 2009, Rustam Emomali began attending major international summits and meetings with foreign dignitaries in Tajikistan. In 2010, he became a member of the central executive committee of the People's Democratic Party of Tajikistan and was elected a member of the Dushanbe municipal parliament.

In February 2011, Emomali Rahmon appointed Rustam Emomali head of the anti-smuggling department in the Customs Service, the first in a number of senior law-enforcement positions that the Tajik president's son has held. Soon after the appointment, he was given the rank of major. In November 2013, Rustam Emomali was appointed head of the Customs Service. The appointment came with a new military rank, major general. In March 2015, president Emomali Rahmon appointed his son to head Tajikistan's principal anti-corruption agency, the State Agency For Financial Control and Measures Against Corruption.

In January 2017, Rustam Emomali was appointed Mayor of Dushanbe by his father, a key position, which is seen by some analysts as the next step to the top of the government.

=== Political succession speculations ===
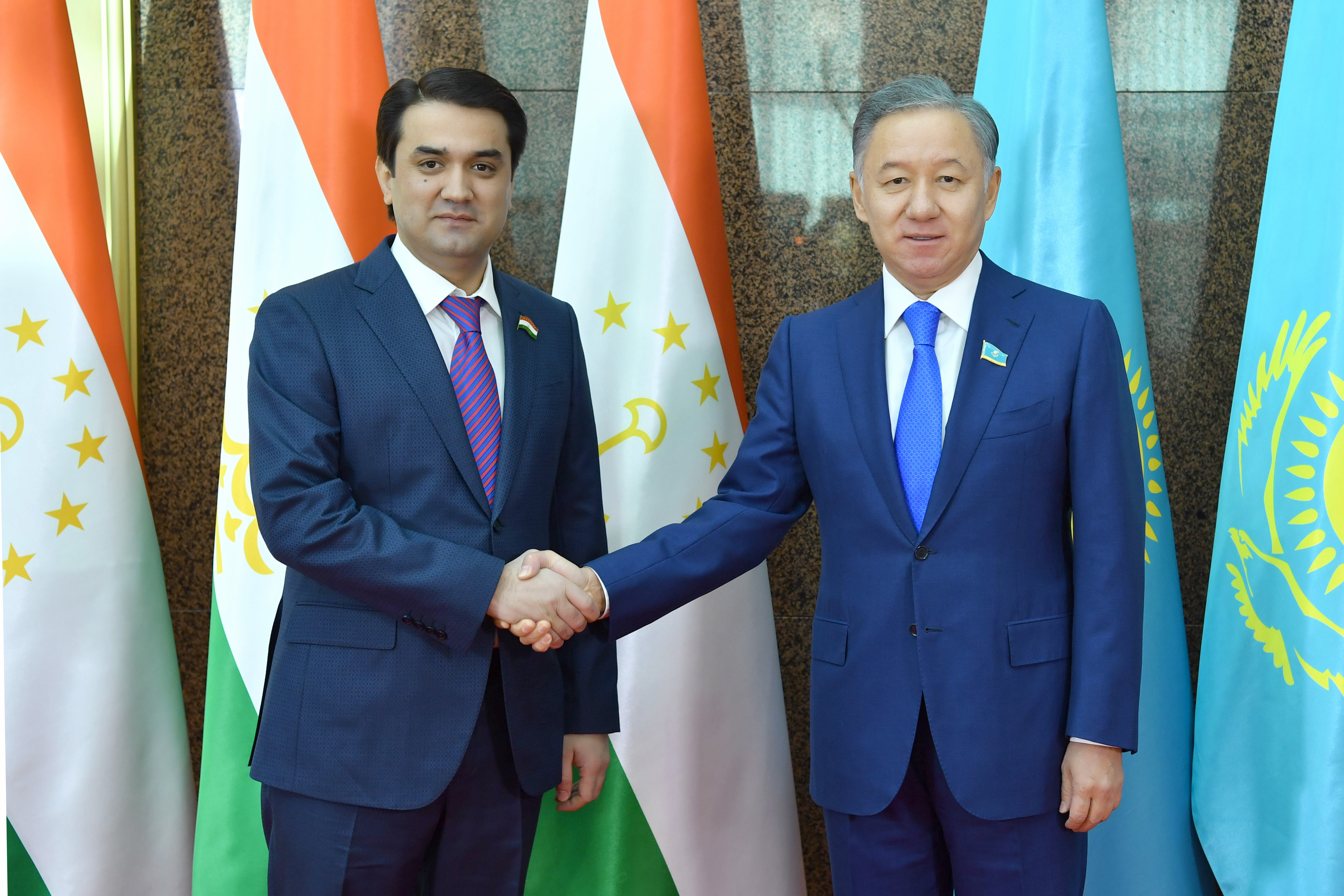
Emomali with Nurlan Nigmatulin, 24 September 2021

Rustam Emomali's rapid career growth and his appointments to a number of different senior government positions has fueled speculations that he was being prepared to succeed his father as the leader of Tajikistan. Rustam Emomali attends all key international summits in the country and accompanies his father during his frequent tours around the country.

On 22 May 2016, a nationwide referendum approved a number of changes to the country's constitution. One of the key amendments reduced the minimum eligibility age for presidential candidates from 35 to 30, effectively enabling Rustam Emomali to succeed his father in office after 2017.

== Personal life ==
Rustam Emomali is the oldest son of Tajikistan's president, Emomali Rahmon. He has eight siblings, including a younger brother, Somon. He got married in 2009 to a daughter of a well-connected entrepreneur who owns a number of food-processing enterprises. The couple has three children, two sons and a daughter.

Rustam's elder sister, Ozoda Rahmon, is the Presidential chief of staff and a former senator in the National Assembly. One of his other sisters, Zarina Rahmon, was a deputy head of Orienbank, appointed in January 2017.

== Notes ==
Political offices
Preceded by Mahmadsaid Ubaydulloyev	Mayor of Dushanbe; 2017–present	Incumbent
Preceded by Mahmadsaid Ubaydulloyev	Chairman of the Majlisi Milli; 2020–present	Incumbent
