= State Committee for Construction =

USSR government body

State Committee for Construction and Investment
- Государственный комитет СССР по строительству и инвестициям

Agency overview
- Formed: 9 May 1950
- Dissolved: 14 November 1991
- Jurisdiction: USSR
- Headquarters: Moscow, Russia
- Agency executive: Ignaty Novikov, chairperson
- Parent agency: Council of Ministers of the Soviet Union

The Gosstroy (Russian: Государственный комитет СССР по строительству и инвестициям (Госстрой)) or State Committee for Construction in the Soviet Union (Gosstroy) was the government body for the implementation of national planning, monitoring and management in the construction sector of the USSR. It handled numerous construction projects (with the exception of military and nuclear power generation).

According to the Soviet Constitution the committee was under the Union-Republican body. The committee had a seal with the coat of arms of the Soviet Union and emblems of the Union and autonomous republics.

== History ==
It was formed on 9 May 1950.

After January 1952 construction of residential and civil buildings and structures were carried out on projects and budgets, in accordance with instructions from the committee.

In November 1952 the committee participated in the development of the Tatar Strait tunnel in Sakhalin project.

In November 1955 the State Committee published the famous Resolution of Central Committee and USSR Council "On elimination of excesses in design and construction," which marked the beginning of model homes, for which Khrushchyovka among others criticized the committee.

=== Liquidation ===
The committee was closed on 14 November 1991 and out of the State Council Decree of the USSR on the Elimination of the Union ministries and departments and managerial – to 1 December 1991 and the transfer of their property and possessions.

According to the decree of 28 November 1991 and President of Russia Boris Yeltsin the financial and other resources, enterprises, organizations and institutions controlled by the committee were given to the Ministry of Architecture, Building and Housing RSFSR, and its executive functions were given to the Federal Agency for Construction and Housing and Utilities.

== Structure ==
The committee was headed by a chairman, appointed in accordance with Soviet Constitution USSR Supreme Soviet, and in the periods between sessions - USSR Supreme Soviet Presidium, with subsequent approval at the session of the USSR Supreme.

== See also ==
- Rosstroy
