= Dongfeng EQ2050 =

Chinese military light utility vehicle based on Humvee

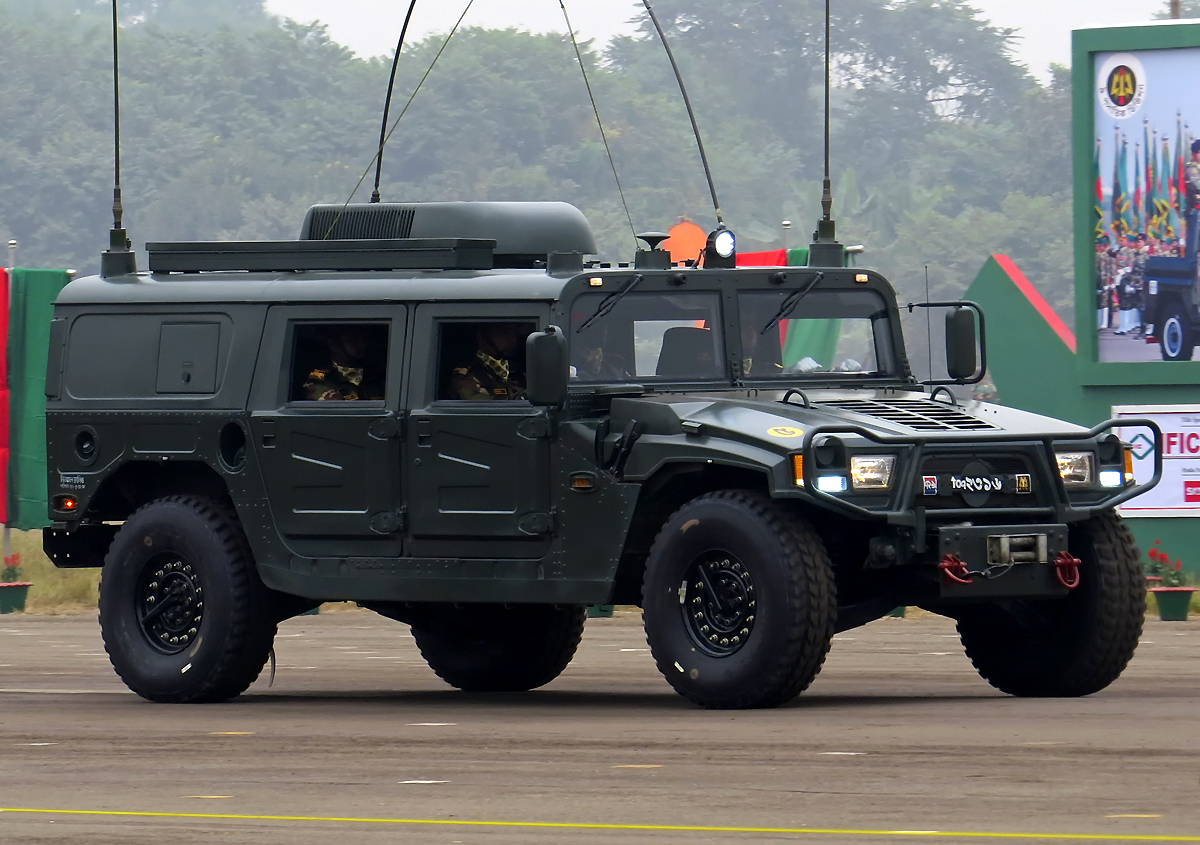
- A Bangladeshi army EQ2050 in 2015
- Type: Military light utility vehicle (unarmored); Infantry mobility vehicle (armored)
- Place of origin: China

Service history
- In service: 2007–present
- Used by: See Users

Production history
- Designer: AM General (Note: The design was based on AM General's Humvee)
- Designed: 2004
- Manufacturer: Dongfeng Motor Group
- Produced: 2007–present
- Variants: See Variants

Specifications
- Mass: 3,250 kg (7,170 lb) (Curb Weight)
- Length: 4,970 mm (196 in)
- Width: 2,134 mm (84.0 in)
- Height: 1,960 mm (77 in)
- Crew: 1 (Driver)
- Passengers: 3 (Passengers)
- Main armament: Various
- Secondary armament: Various
- Engine: GM 6.5 litre V8 turbo-charged diesel (EQ2050); EQB150-20 110kW/2,700R turbo-charged diesel (EQ2058)
- Transmission: 4-speed gearbox (Automatic) (EQ2050); 5-speed gearbox (Manual) (EQ2058)
- Operational range: 130 km/h (Maximum Road Speed)

The Dongfeng EQ2050 (东风EQ2050) (Note: It is also known as Dongfeng Mengshi (东风猛士)) is a Chinese reproduction of the Humvee, manufactured for government use by the Dongfeng Motor Group. The company is known to have sold the vehicle at 700,000 Yuan ($93,000) per unit. The vehicle was created after People's Liberation Army (PLA) officials saw the Humvee deployed in the Gulf War. While it is used in the PLA, it has also been exported to friendly countries for military use.

The EQ2050 is largely being replaced in its role by the newer Dongfeng Mengshi class of vehicles.

== History ==
AM General presented a Humvee to the PLA for a demonstration in 1988 at the Beijing Defence Exhibition. The PLA were initially not interested in the vehicle, due to concerns of high maintenance costs and the vehicle's bulky size. The Humvee were later seen in action worldwide via television during Operation Desert Storm, which gave the PLA second thoughts about having a similar vehicle for military use.

The Chinese petroleum industry purchased civilian Hummers in the 1990s. This gave Chinese automakers the ability to inspect the vehicle for reverse engineering. In 2003, the EQ2050 debuted at a car show after a prototype was made in 2002. Dongfeng Motor Group and Shenyang Aircraft Corporation were involved in producing prototypes similar to the Humvee for the PLA, with the former being selected.

The vehicle became the PLA's preferred candidate in 2004, with 57 vehicles sent to the organization for trials from 2004 to 2006. They were driven in the Tibetan Plateau, Gobi desert, and the northeastern parts of Heilongjiang province to simulate driving the EQ2050 in winter conditions.

The first 100 EQ2050s were manufactured with US-made parts. They passed design trials in 2006. EQ2050s were then delivered to PLA special forces unit in the Guangzhou Military Region.

While the EQ2050 was adopted by the PLA, it has also been adopted by People's Armed Police firefighter brigades and by Chinese Public Security Police forces. A civilian concept known as the Brave Soldier was put on display at the 2011 Shanghai Auto Show. The CS/VA1 Light Strike Vehicle was first seen on public display at the 2012 Africa Aerospace & Defence Exhibition in Pretoria, South Africa.

In October 2016, the EQ2050 was reported to be deployed by the PLA near the Afghan-Chinese border. During the 2020 Belarusian protests, various news agencies reported the deployment of Belarusian EQ2050s throughout Minsk.

On January 4, 2024, the PLA's Hong Kong Garrison officially reported the acquisition of the PCP001.

== Development ==
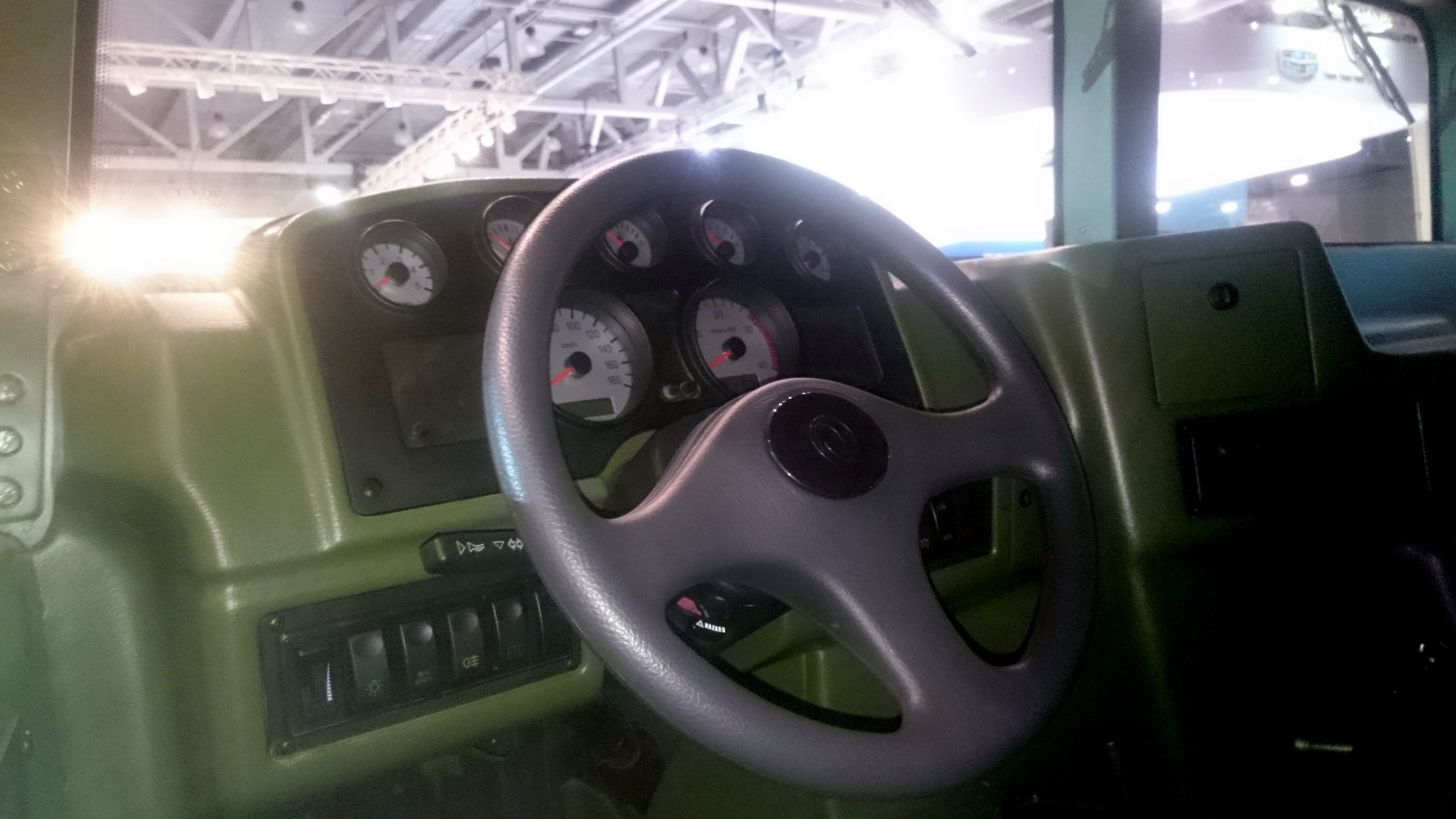
Interior of the EQ2050 at the 2016 Moscow International Automobile Salon convention.

When the vehicle was first built, the EQ2050 included the Hummer H1 chassis. It was powered by a Dongfeng-built Cummins EQB150-20 110 kW/2,700R turbo-charged diesel engine, but it came with the option of using a U.S.-made V8 diesel engine instead. The licensing rights for the Cummins engine were purchased so that Beijing could avoid any potential sanctions.

Since 2008, almost all parts for the EQ2050 are made in China. Both the EQ2050 and EQ2058 vehicles have a 5-speed gear box and a 2-speed transfer box.

The EQ2050 is a four-wheel drive vehicle with an independent suspension system and central inflating system. The EQ2050 has redesigned lights and radiators. Dongfeng worked with AM General Motors to acquire American parts for the first EQ2050s made in production before the company was able to produce the necessary parts in China. The vehicle can be configured to be armed with machine guns, automatic grenade launcher, or anti-tank missiles mounted on top. Body styles include soft, hard, truck, and van versions.

It was previously licensed to DRB-HICOM in Malaysia to be marketed to countries that needed a right-hand drive vehicle, as the HICOM High Mobility Utility Vehicle (HMUV).

== Variants ==
EQ2050
Original model. Consists of the following models:

- Softtop model (2 door)
- Four door softop model (EQ2050A)
- Four door hardtop model (EQ2050B)
- Two door off road pickup truck model (EQ2050C)
- Pickup truck model (EQ2050D)
- Four door hardtop model (EQ2050E)
- Four door hardtop fastback model (EQ2050F)
- Off-road civilian versions (EQ2050M5 and EQ2052M)

EQ2050M
Updated civilian model sold under the Guowo Dongfeng name (国务东风).

EQ2050M3D
RHD model for export.

EQ2058
A version of the EQ2050 made for military purposes, which has an armored body outfitted via armored plating. Bonnet/door are made of non-composite materials to reduce detection through infrared radiation. Equipped with EMP shielding from EMP disruptions.

CS/VA1 Light Strike Vehicle
A fast attack vehicle that can be equipped with either a machine gun or automatic grenade launcher. It is marketed by Norinco.

CTJ-002 Assault Vehicle
EQ2050 variant with machine gun mounted on top.

CSK-002 Airborne Assault Vehicle
Airborne assault vehicle equipped with smoke grenade dischargers, a machine gun on top and an AGL on the front passenger seat.

PCP-001
82 mm self-propelled rapid-deployment automatic mortar system. The mortar system is fed with a magazine. In service with PLA Airborne Corps and Ground Force combined arms battalions.

DongFeng CS/SS4
Self-propelled mortar system with the Type 81 mortar attached on the vehicle's body.

Dongfeng EQ2050 (M50) with mounted mobile laser system

Brave Soldier
A civilian version of the EQ2050 which will use petrol engines instead of diesel engines as a concept. Sometimes known as EQ2040H Brave Soldier. Working models were shown in Chinese auto shows.

Warrior M50
Production version of the EQ2050 made only for the civilian market.

== Users ==
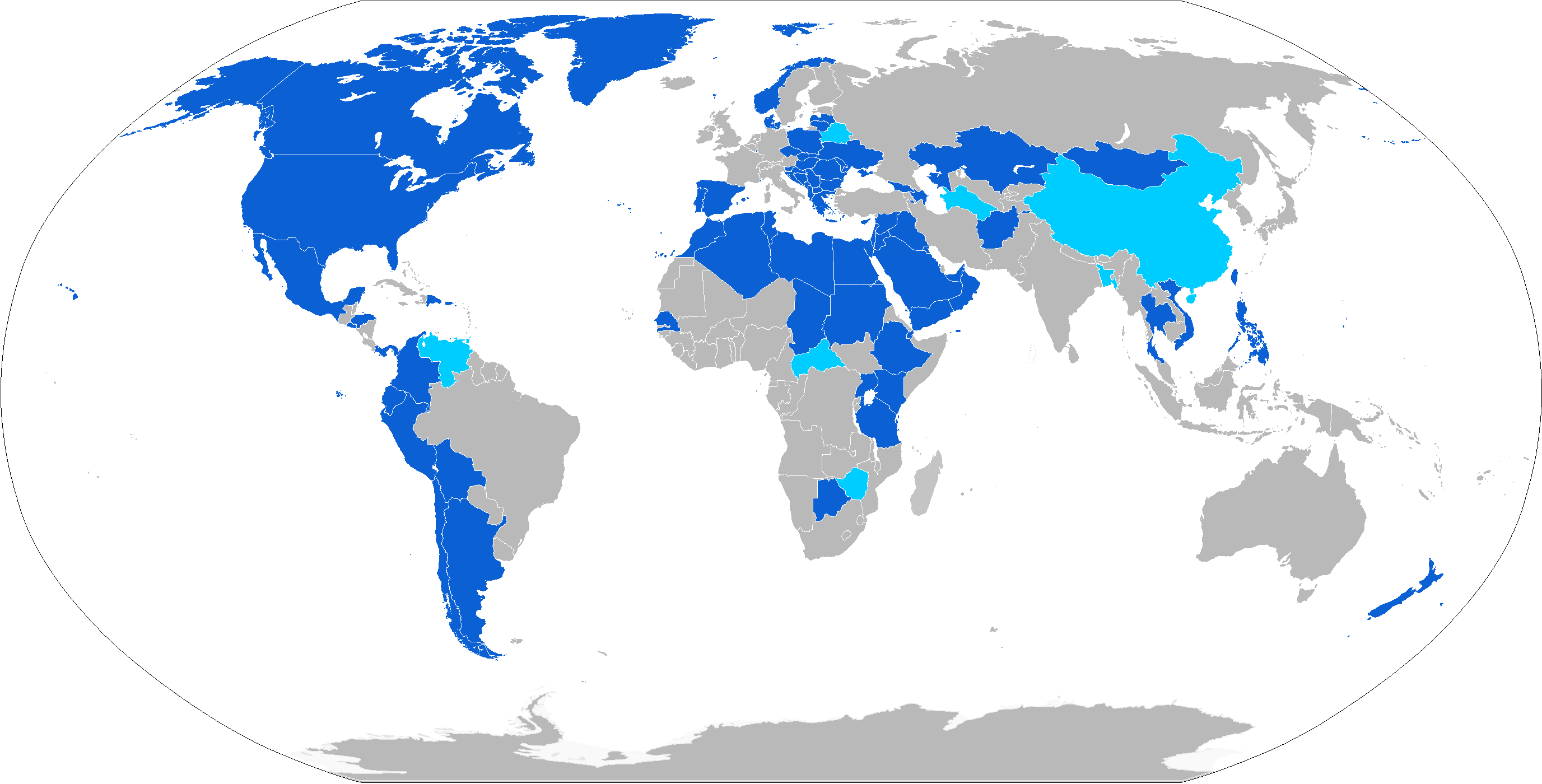
Operators PRC Dongfeng EQ2050 Original HMMWV

- Bangladesh: Bangladesh Army infantry uses Dongfeng EQ2050s.
- Belarus: 22 Dongfeng EQ2058s donated for use by Belarusian Special Forces units. Delivered under an act of gratuitous transfer of military assistance signed by Belarus and China on June 19, 2012, and have made public appearances on its independence day parade. In Belarusian service, it is known as the Bogatyr. They're equipped with either a PK machine gun, 9M113 Konkurs, AGS-17 or the ADUNOK remote control weapons system on top. The hardtop version is only used.
- Burkina Faso: In January 2024, photographs of Burkinabè armed forces with Dongfeng CS/SS4 self-propelled mortars, unveiled in a ceremony attended by Captain Ibrahim Traoré.
- Cambodia: Several supplied to Cambodian Army in 2022.
- Central African Republic: Dongfeng EQ2050s donated in August 2018.
- China: Dongfeng EQ2050s in service with the People's Liberation Army. Also in use by People's Armed Police Fire Fighting brigades and by Public Security Police forces.
- Cuba
- Gabon: Seen with the Gabonese Republican Guard from a 2019 military parade.
- Kyrgyzstan: Used by the Kyrgyz Army.
- Laos: Dongfeng CS/SS4 seen in military parade held to celebrate the 70th anniversary of the Lao People's Armed Forces on January 20, 2019.
- Mali: Reported to be using the EQ2050 since January 2020. EQ2050s shown on display in December 2021.
- Ivory Coast: 15 EQ2050Fs provided to the Ivorian military.
- Tajikistan: Reported to have purchased the EQ2050F and the CS/SS4 as of February 21, 2020 when they were put on a parade. The EQ2050Fs were reported to be used by the 7th Airborne Assault Brigade.
- Trinidad and Tobago: EQ2050s in use with the Trinidad and Tobago Defence Force.
- Turkmenistan
- Venezuela
- Vietnam: EQ2050s used by Vietnamese troops in UN-backed peacekeeping missions, painted in white with UN markings.
- Zimbabwe: Dongfeng EQ2050s used by the Zimbabwe Defence Forces with 100 EQ2050s bought in 2004 with more bought in 2007. 300 EQ2050s in service with the ZDF.

=== Failed contracts ===
- Namibia: In 2013, the Namibia Defence Force was evaluating CS/VA1 Light Strike Vehicles for possible purchase. Namibia ended up choosing the Agrale Marruá.

=== Non-State Actors ===
- United Wa State Army

== See also ==
- Humvee clone manufacturing in China
