= Order of the Crown (Tajikistan) =

- Insignia of the order

Awarded by President of Tajikistan
- Status: Currently constituted

Precedence
- Next (higher): Order of the Star of the President of Tajikistan
- Next (lower): Order of Ismoili Somoni

The Order of the Crown (Tajik: Зарринтоҷ) is a state award of the Republic of Tajikistan. It is awarded to statesmen, public figures, and other citizens of Tajikistan for outstanding service to the state, active state and socio-political activities, for high achievements in implementing democratic transformations and economic reforms, and for dedication and civic valor demonstrated in strengthening peace, stability, and strengthening Tajik statehood, among others. It is also awarded to foreigners

== Grades ==
The Order of the Crown is divided into three grades:

- I degree - The badge of the order is worn on a ribbon over the right shoulder and the star of the order on the left side of the chest.
- II degree - It has a sign that is worn by males on a ribbon around the neck and females on a ribbon bow on the left side of the chest.
- III degree - It has a sign that is worn on a ribbon on the left side of the chest.

== Recipients ==
Notable awardees include:

=== Tajik ===
- Mahmadsaid Ubaydulloyev - Mayor of Dushanbe from 1996 to 2017 (13 January 2016)
- Shukurjon Zuhurov - Chairman of the Assembly of Representatives (2019)
- Rajabali Rahmonali - Chairman of the Committee of Emergency Situations and Civil Defense of Tajikistan (2013)
- Sherali Mirzo - Minister of Defense from 2013 – 2015 (2013)

=== Foreign ===
- Xi Jinping - General Secretary of the Chinese Communist Party and President of China (15 June 2019)
- Shavkat Mirziyoyev - President of Uzbekistan (2021)
