= Aminjan Shokuhi =

Aminjan Shokuhi was a Tajik poet (1923–1979). He is known for poems such as "Maktab" and "My Beloved City".
