= Rosstroy =

Defunct Russian government agency

Rosstroy (sometimes Rosstroi) was the governmental agency for construction, residential and utilities services in Russia. It was the successor of Gosstroy, a Soviet agency.

The full name of the authority is Federal agency of construction, housing and housing services of the Russian Federation.

The agency was abolished by D.A. Medvedev's Decree (Ukase) N 724 of 12 May 2008.

Since 2013, its responsibilities are in the hands of Ministry of Construction Industry, Housing and Utilities Sector.
