= Alpha Group (Tajikistan) =

- Альфа
- Active: 1991; 35 years ago
- Country: Tajikistan
- Branch: State Committee for National Security
- Type: Spetsnaz
- Role: Counter-terrorism; Hostage rescue Special operations
- Size: Classified
- Part of: State Committee for National Security
- Garrison/HQ: Dushanbe

The Tajik Alpha Group (Russian: Альфа) is an elite unit of the State Committee for National Security of Tajikistan, tasked to conduct counter-terrorism operations in Tajikistan. The unit is modeled after the Soviet KGB's Alpha Group.

== History ==
During the Tajik civil war, special forces units were formed to support the Tajik National Army, with the first of these units forming in 1991. The unit's first operators were drawn from the former Special Forces of the KGB of the Tajik Soviet Socialist Republic. This laid the groundwork for the Alpha Group. Many members would later split off and form the 7th Airborne Assault Battalion in 1997.

=== Post-USSR breakup ===
The elimination of the dissident warlord Rahmon Sanginov (also known as Rahmon Hitler) and his fighters in the summer 2001 is often described as the Tajik Alphas' first major successful operation. In October 2010, during the government military operation against several renegade warlords in the Rasht Valley, a military helicopter carrying Alpha troops crashed near the village of Tavildara. At least 19 members of the unit died as the result of the crash, leaving the SCNS with only 32 Alphas on duty.

In September 2015, the Alphas' commander, Colonel Rustam Amakiev, along with another member of the unit were killed during clashes with the mutinous former Deputy Defense Minister Abduhalim Nazarzoda and his supporters.

== Role ==
Although little is known about the current size of the unit and the nature of its primary directives, the unit is formally designed for counter-terrorism tasks. The 2011 International Crisis Group report described the Alphas as "the only Tajik military unit with serious counter-insurgency expertise".

The Alphas are often dispatched to the different areas of Tajikistan ahead of visits by the country's president. They are also the first to be dispatched during the sporadic outbreaks of violence throughout the country. It also has operated in the Gorno Badakhshan Autonomous Region (GBAO) to hunt wolves that attacked villagers in the mountainous regions.

== Commanders ==
- Colonel Rustam Amakiev (until September 2015)
- Colonel Nazar Naimov (since 2015)
