= Order of Glory (Afghanistan) =

Order of Glory د عظمت امر

Awarded by the President of Afghanistan
- Type: Civil order
- Established: May 17, 1982
- Country: Democratic Republic of Afghanistan
- Status: Inactive

Statistics
- Last induction: 1992

Precedence
- Next (higher): Order of Friendship of Peoples
- Next (lower): Order of Bravery

The Order of Glory (Pashto: د عظمت امر) is a state award of the Democratic Republic of Afghanistan established in 1982. The order was awarded to citizens of the Democratic Republic of Afghanistan and foreign nationals.

== Overview ==
The order was established on May 17, 1982. It was awarded to citizens of the state and foreign nationals, individuals and organizations, enterprises, provinces and cities. It was awarded for outstanding state and social activities, for great achievements in the development of national culture, literature and art, for particularly fruitful activities in the education of civil servants and for impeccable work in state administration aimed at all-round development. After the collapse of the Democratic Republic of Afghanistan, the order was abolished in 1992.

The badge of the order has the shape of a regular eight-pointed star with points formed by convex silver-plated rays of different lengths. In the middle is a large round medallion with a border formed by three rings in green, red and black, which correspond to the colors of the Flag of Afghanistan. The background of the medallion is blue enamele. In the middle is a symbol of a sickle and a hammer lying on an open book. Above them is a small red enameled five-pointed star. In the lower part, the central motif is surrounded on both sides by an open green enameled laurel wreath. The badge is attached by a simple eyelet to a metal plate in the shape of a pentagon.

A 24 mm wide silk moiré ribbon covers a pentagon-shaped metal plate. The ribbon is blue with three 1.5 mm wide white stripes in the middle.

== Recipients ==
- Saidullo Khairullaev, Chairman of Assembly of Representatives of Tajikistan from 2000-2010.
- Abdul Rashid Dostum, First Vice President of Afghanistan (2014-2020).
- Ruslan Aushev, President of Ingushetia from March 1993 to December 2001 and the youngest officer in the Soviet Army to reach the rank of lieutenant general.
- Tuleutai Suleimenov, the first Minister of Foreign Affairs of Kazakhstan.
