= Order of Friendship (Tajikistan) =

Awarded by President of Tajikistan
- Established: 14 December 1996
- Status: Currently constituted
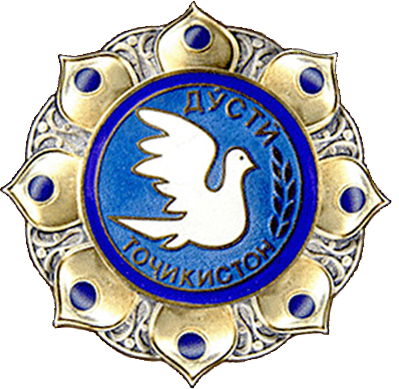
- Ribbon of the order

The Order of Friendship (Tajik: Ордени Дўстӣ) is Tajikistan's highest distinction. It was instituted on 14 December 1996 and is awarded to statesmen and public figures for their active role in strengthening peace and cooperation between the different ethnicities in Tajikistan.

== Recipients ==
- Ramazan Abdulatipov
- Abdulmajid Dostiev
- Helen Clark
- Aga Khan IV
- Davlatmand Kholov
- Ján Kubiš
- Mahmadsaid Ubaydulloyev
- Vitaly Naumkin
- Borys Paton
- Yevgeny Primakov
- Vladimir Pronichev
- Rustam Minnikhanov
- Ján Kubiš
