= Committee of Emergency Situations and Civil Defense of Tajikistan =

Emergencies and civil defense ministry of Tajikistan

- Кумитаи ҳолатҳои фавқулодда ва мудофиаи граждании назди Ҳукумати Ҷумҳурии Тоҷикистон
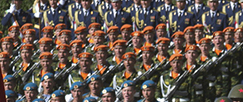
- Troops from the KHF

Agency overview
- Formed: 17 August 1918; 108 years ago
- Jurisdiction: Government of Tajikistan
- Headquarters: Dushanbe
- Agency executive: Colonel General Rajabali Rahmonali, Chairman
- Website: www.khf.tj/ru/

The Committee of Emergency Situations and Civil Defense of Tajikistan (KHF) (Tajik: Кумитаи ҳолатҳои фавқулодда ва мудофиаи граждании назди Ҳукумати Ҷумҳурии Тоҷикистон, Russian: Комитет по чрезвычайным ситуациям и гражданской обороне при правительстве Таджикистана) is the emergencies and civil defense ministry of Tajikistan. The ministry is authorized to make decisions on the protection of the Tajik population/territory from natural disasters and other geological processes.

== Names ==
- Anti-Domestic Defense Force (1918–1961)
- Civil Defense of the Tajik SSR (1961–1992)
- Committee of Civil Defense of the Ministry of Defense (1992–1999)
- Ministry of Emergency Situations and Civil Defense (1999–2000)
- Committee of Emergency Situations and Civil Defense of Tajikistan (2000–Present)

== Structure ==
- KHF Headquarters
  - Office of the Chairman
  - General Directorate
  - Main Department of Population and Territory Protection
  - Personnel Office
  - Department of Management of construction, Operation of Buildings and Structures
  - Personnel Department
  - International Cooperation Office
  - Financial and Economic Management Department
  - Medical Management Department
  - Crisis Management Center
  - Legal Department
  - Public Relations Department
- Operational Section
  - Central Apparatus
  - Office of Specialized Search and Rescue Services
  - Office of Logistics, Food and Transport
  - Sarez Lake Department
  - KHF Office in the Autonomous Regions
  - Department of Emergency and Civil Defense Committee for Kulob and the Khatlon Region
  - Department of the District Departments
  - Rapid Response Rescue squads
  - Anti-Hail Service
  - Civil Defense Troops
- Republican organizations
  - Republican Training Center
  - Republican Chemical Radiometric Laboratory
  - Military Hospital
  - Republican Militarized Mountain Rescue Service

== List of chairmen ==
Since 1994, the KHF has had the following chairmen:

- H. Achilov (1994–1996)
- A. Boboev (1996–1998)
- M. Iskandarov (1998–1999)
- M. Ziyoev (1999–2006)
- Mahmadtohir Zokirzoda (2006–2008)
- H. Latipov (2008–2012)
- Khayriddina Abdurahimov (2012–February 2, 2016)
- Rustam Nazarzoda (February 2, 2016–?)
- Rajabali Rahmonali (21 January 2025–Present)

== Cooperation with regional partners ==
The KHF had made many agreements with its regional neighbors such as the Russian Federation and China, which date back to the country's establishment in 1991. Similar agreements on a much smaller scale have been established between countries such as Kyrgyzstan, Switzerland and Ukraine. The committee closely cooperates with the international organizations on humanitarian affairs such as the United Nations and its subordinate bodies (UNICEF, the Red Cross and United Nations Office for the Coordination of Humanitarian Affairs).
