= FIFA Development Committee =

- Headquarters: Zürich, Switzerland
- Official language: English, French, Spanish, German
- Chairperson: Nualphan Lamsam
- Deputy Chairperson: Lyndon Cooper
- Website: https://www.fifa.com/who-we-are/committees/committee/1934070/

The FIFA Development Committee is one of the nine standing committees of FIFA. Its purpose is to deal with FIFA’s development programs.

== Membership ==
The Fifa Development Committee for the 2025–2029 term is composed as follows:

Role	Name	Country
FIFA Council delegate	Hany Abo Rida	Egypt
Chairperson	Nualphan Lamsam	Thailand
Deputy chairperson	Lyndon Cooper	Saint Lucia
Members	Maria Abella	Colombia
Members	Issaka Adamou	Niger
Members	Mansoor Al Ansari	Qatar
Members	Ali Bin Khalifa Al Khalifa	Bahrain
Members	Sophie Beyala	Cameroon
Members	Teófilo Cubillas	Peru
Members	Dragan Džajić	Serbia
Members	Kieron Edwards	Trinidad and Tobago
Members	Milashu Isaak	Eritrea
Members	Mike Jones	Wales
Members	John Kapi Natto	Papua New Guinea
Members	Pablo Milad	Chile
Members	Pierre Mounguengui	Gabon
Members	Samuel Petaia	Samoa
Members	Manuel Quintanilla	Nicaragua
Members	Abdoulaye Sow	Senegal
Members	Mamoutou Touré	Mali
Members	David Trunda	Czechia
Members	Dasho Ugen Tsechup	Bhutan
Members	Marton Vagi	Hungary
