= National Assembly of Tajikistan =

Upper house of the Tajik legislature

National Assembly Маҷлиси миллии Национальный совет

Type
- Type: Upper house of the Supreme Assembly of Tajikistan

History
- Founded: 6 November 1994

Leadership
- Chairman of the Majlisi Milli: Rustam Emomali, People's Democratic Party since 17 April 2020

Structure
- Seats: 33
- Political groups: Independents (33)
- Length of term: 5 years

Elections
- Voting system: 25 seats chosen by deputies of regional assembly; 8 seats appointed by the President of Tajikistan

Meeting place
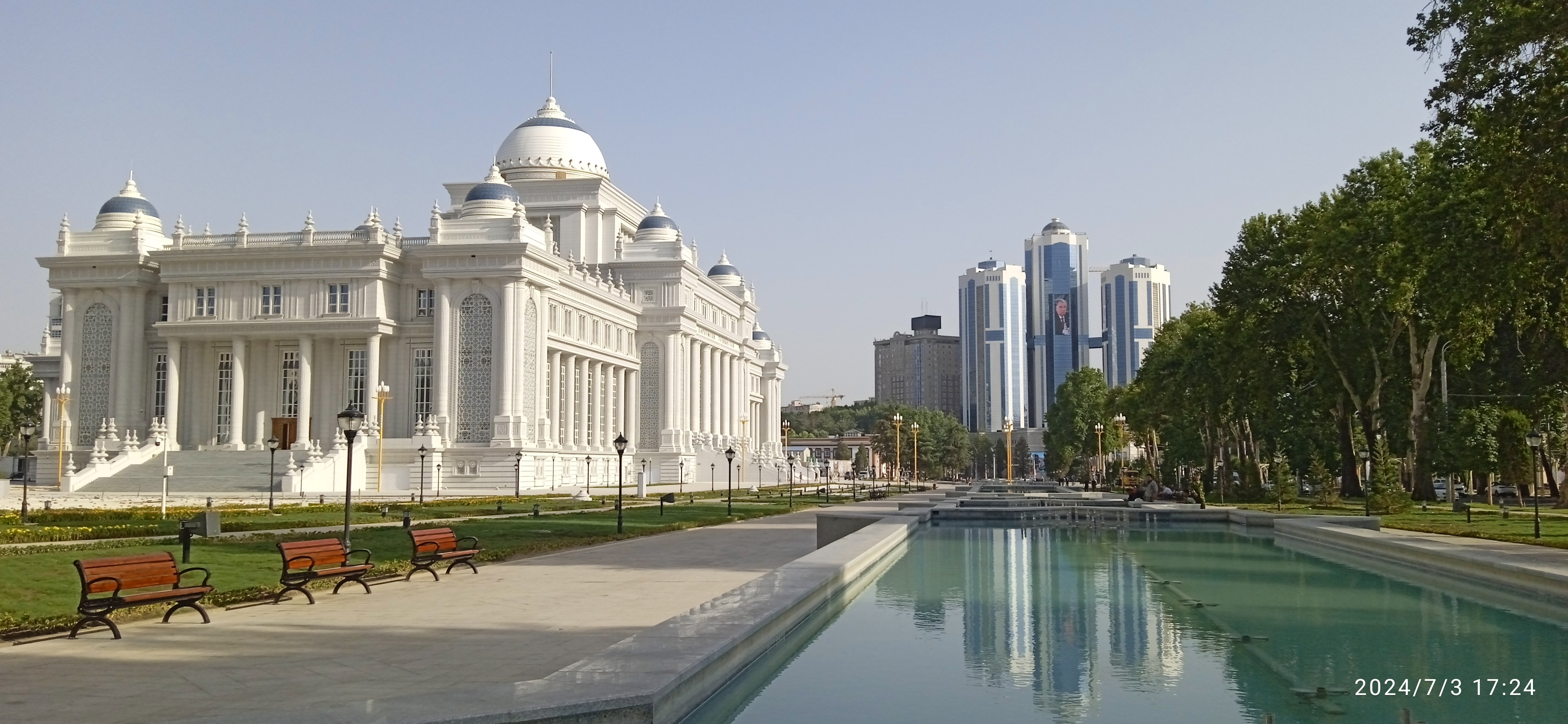
- Parliament Building; Dousti Square, Dushanbe, Tajikistan

The National Assembly (Tajik: Маҷлиси миллии, romanized: Majlisi milliyi, pronounced [mad͡ʒˈlisi milˈliji]; Russian: Национальный совет) is the upper chamber of Tajikistan's bicameral parliament. Rustam Emomali, who is the son of incumbent President Emomali Rahmon, is serving as the Chairman of the Majlisi Milli since 17 April 2020.

Twenty-five members were elected on 28 March 2025 and the President appointed one quarter of the members in April, bringing the total number of members to thirty-one.

== Electoral system ==
25 out of 33 members of the National Assembly are elected indirectly by district and city councils from the five regions of Tajikistan for a five-year term with each region being represented by equal number of members. The other eight members are appointed by the president. By right, former presidents are members for life.

== Chairmen of Majlisi Milli ==
No.	Portrait	Name (birth–death)	Term of office		Duration	Political party	Notes
1		Mahmadsaid Ubaydulloyev; Маҳмадсаид Убайдуллоев (born 1952) (Note: As Chairman of Majlisi Mili, he was the de facto number second in Tajikistan.)	17 April 2000	17 April 2020	20 years, 4 days	PDP	
2		Rustam Emomali; Рустам Эмомалӣ (born 1987) (Note: As Chairman of Majlisi Mili, he is the de facto number second in Tajikistan.)	17 April 2020	Incumbent	6 years, 204 days	PDP	
