= State Committee for National Security (Tajikistan) =

Tajik national intelligence agency

- Кумитаи давлатии амнияти миллӣ (Tajik)
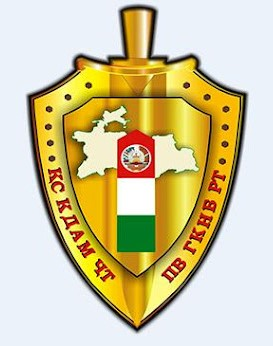
- Logo of the SCNS

Special service overview
- Formed: 27 December 1991
- Preceding Special service: KGB of the Tajik SSR
- Jurisdiction: Government of Tajikistan
- Headquarters: Dushanbe, Tajikistan
- Employees: Classified
- Annual budget: Classified
- Special service executive: Colonel General Saimumin Yatimov, Chairman
- Website: https://sarhad.tj/kumita/

The State Committee for National Security (SCNS; Tajik: Кумитаи давлатии амнияти миллӣ, romanized: Kumitai Davlatii Amniyati Millī; Russian: Государственный комитет национальной безопасности) is the principal national security and intelligence agency of Tajikistan. Its main responsibilities include internal and border security, counter-intelligence, counter-terrorism, counter-narcotics, fighting organized crime, and surveillance. The chairman of the committee and all of his deputies are appointed by and answerable to the president of Tajikistan. Colonel General Saimumin Yatimov has served as the SCNS chairman since September 2, 2010.

The SCNS is governed by the Law About National Security Bodies of the Republic of Tajikistan. Its activity is formally overseen by the Office of the Prosecutor General, although in practice the external oversight of the SCNS is virtually non-existent.

== History ==
The SCNS is the Tajik successor organization to the Committee for State Security (KGB) of the Soviet Union and its regional affiliate in the Tajik SSR. Following the dissolution of the Soviet Union, the State Security Committee of the Tajik Soviet Socialist Republic was renamed the National Security Committee (Tajik: Кумитаи амнияти миллӣ; Russian: Комитет национальной безопасности) of the Republic of Tajikistan on December 28, 1991. In 1995, the State Security Committee was reorganized and renamed into the Ministry of Security (Tajik: Вазорати амният; Russian: Министерство безопасности). On November 30, 2006, the Ministry of Security was disbanded, and the newly created State Committee for National Security took over its responsibilities. The new agency also took responsibility for border security that had previously fallen under the mandate of the State Committee for Border Protection.

Colonel General Khayriddin Abdurakhimov served as Tajikistan's Minister of Security from March 1999 to November 2006. When the SCNS was created, Abdurakhimov was appointed its chairperson and led the committee until September 2010. Following a daring escape of 25 inmates from the SCNS high-security detention center in Dushanbe on August 23, 2010, Abdurakhimov and his four deputies filed resignations letters.

On September 2, 2010, president Emomali Rahmon signed the resignation letters, appointing Lieutenant General Saymumin Yatimov, one of Abdurakhimov's deputies, as the chairperson of the SCNS.

== Organization ==
The SCNS is headquartered at the intersection of Jalol Ikrami Street and Sheroz Street in the center of Dushanbe. Below the nationwide level, the SCNS has regional offices in all districts and regions of Tajikistan. It also has administrations in the armed forces and other military institutions, Ministry of Internal Affairs, national railway company, and national air carrier.

There is no open information about the current organizational structure of the SCNS due to the atmosphere of secrecy shrouding the organization. However, the SCNS has most likely retained a structure similar to the Soviet Union's Committee for State Security. The SCNS has separate departments (Russian: управление) responsible for foreign espionage, counter-intelligence, political surveillance in the armed forces, counter-terrorism and counter-extremism, border control, economic security, protection of the top political officials, censorship and surveillance, economic security, personnel, and investigation.

=== Bodies under its jurisdiction ===
The committee operates the Higher School of the State Committee for National Security in Dushanbe which trains officers for the agency. It has command over the Tajik Alpha Group unit.

== List of chairmen ==
=== Chairmen of the KGB of the Tajik SSR ===
- Dmitry Kochetov (1 April 1954 – 2 April 1957)
- Semyon Tsvigun (2 April 1957 – 22 October 1963)
- Mikhail Milyutin (22 October 1963 – 7 May 1968)
- Sergey Sazonov (7 May 1968 – 26 November 1970)
- Vasily Shevchenko (26 November 1970 – 15 October 1975)
- Yevgeny Perventsev (15 October 1975 – 17 January 1985)
- Vladimir Petkel (17 January 1985 – 1 July 1991)
- Anatoly Stroykin (1 July 1991 – 28 December 1991)

=== Ministers of National Security/Chairmen of the SCNS ===
- Saidamir Zukhurov (1992–1995, 1996–1999)
- Saidanvar Kamolov (1995–1996)
- Khayriddin Abdurakhimov (March 1999 – September 2010)
- Saimumin Yatimov (since 2 September 2010)

== Criticism ==
The SCNS is often accused of human rights violations and disregard for the due process of law. Susan Corke, director of Eurasia Programs at Freedom House, has described the SCNS as "a notoriously corrupt and repressive institution, allegedly involved in drug smuggling and openly engaged in repression of legitimate political dissent". The organization is frequently accused of using torture, deaths in custody, and occasional extrajudicial killings.

Overall, Tajikistan's law enforcement agencies, and the SCNS in particular, are notorious for ignoring the due process of law, using violence as an interrogation technique, extrajudicial killings, searches without warrants, disappearances, the planting of incriminating evidence, and arresting individuals for conduct that was not illegal.

== See also ==
- SCNS Higher School
