= Mayor of Dushanbe =

- Шаҳрдори Душанбе
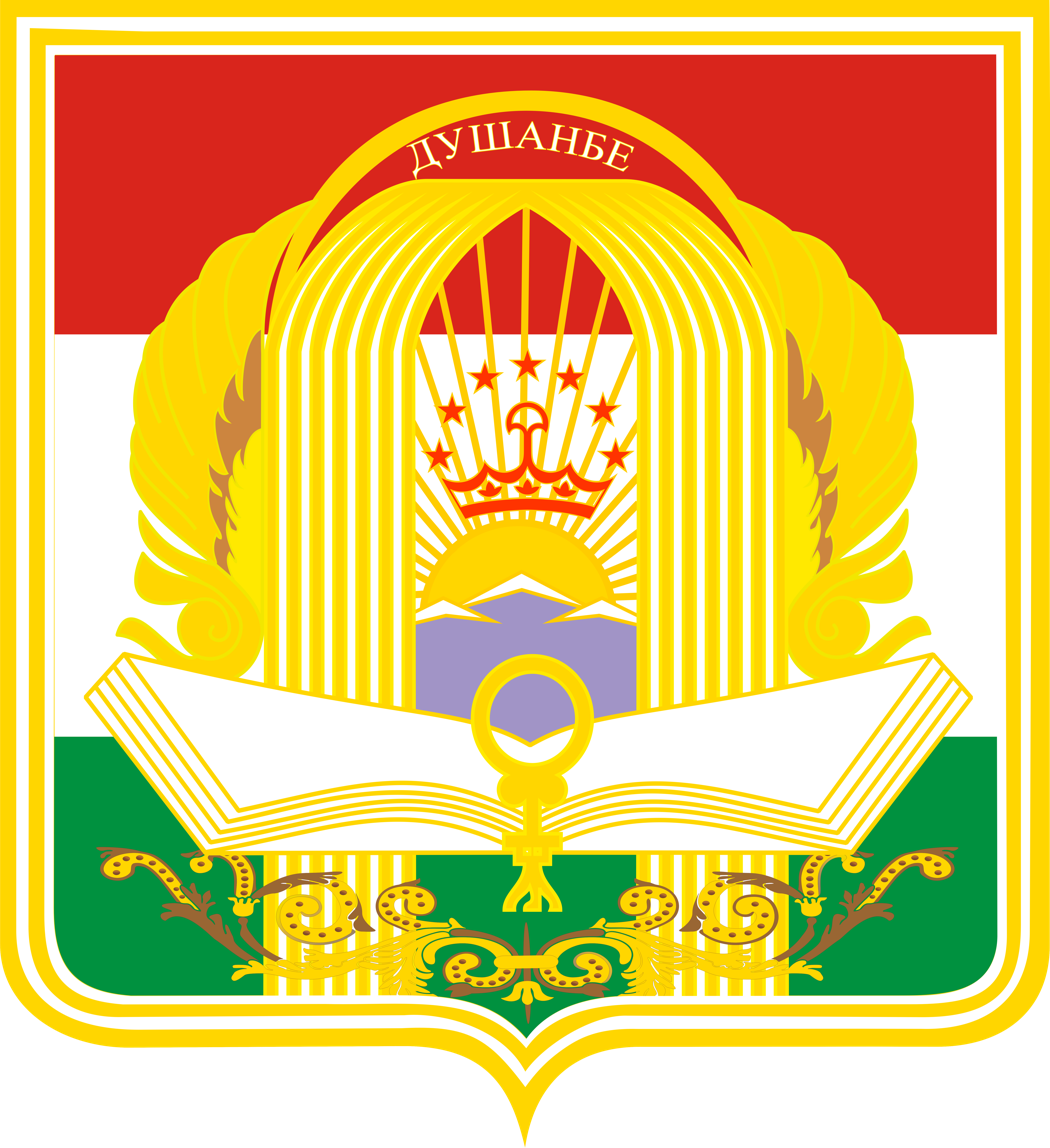
- Coat of Arms of Dushanbe

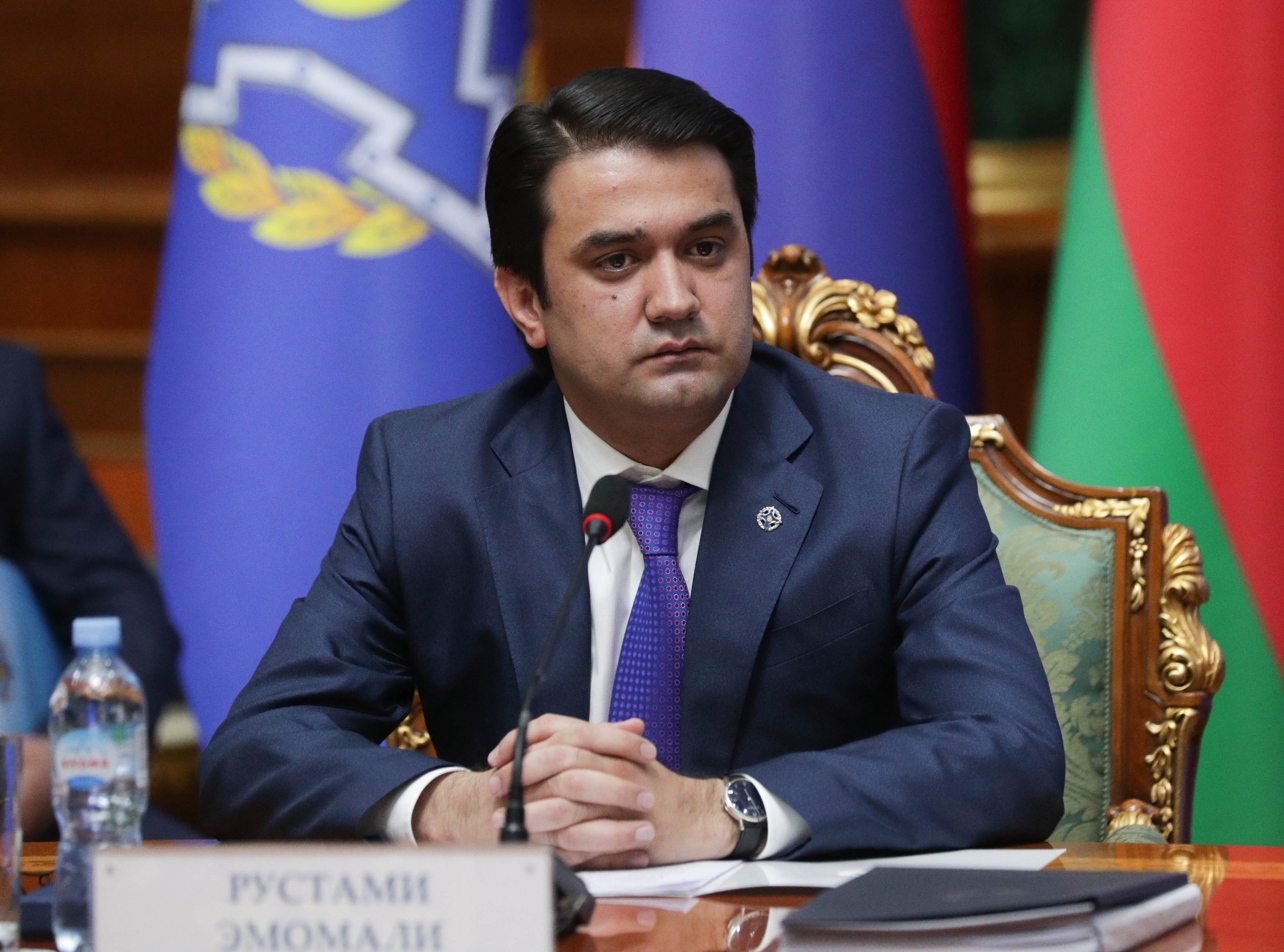
- Incumbent; Rustam Emomali since 12 January 2017
- Style: Mr. Mayor
- Appointer: President of Tajikistan
- Inaugural holder: Mirzotemur Mirzoev
- Formation: 6 November 1992
- Website: http://www.dushanbe.tj/

The Mayor of Dushanbe (Tajik: Шаҳрдори Душанбе, romanized: Shahrdori Dushanbe) is the chief executive of the Tajik capital of Dushanbe. The current mayor of Dushanbe is Rustam Emomali.

== Soviet era leaders of the capital ==
Until November 1994, power in the capital was derived from the Council of People's Deputies and its executive committee. Chairmen of the Executive Committee of Dushanbe have included:

- Mirzosharif Rahimov (1925–1926)
- Juma Ziyo (1926–1928)
- Bobonazar Mirzoev (1928–1929)
- С. Vazirov (1929–1930)
- J. Yakubov (1930–1931)
- L. Rizoev (1931–1932)
- B. Khamdamov (1932–1933)
- А. Yormuhammadov (1933)
- А. Raziqov (1933–1937)
- J. Shanbezoda (1937–1938)
- М. Kalitin (1938–1940)
- T. Sarayev (1940–1943)
- S. Yusufov (1943–1947)
- G. Yakubov (1947–1950)
- К. Ibragimov (1950–1953)
- А. Asrorov (1953–1956)
- K. Solehboev (1956–1957)
- Н. Bobojonov (1957–1960)
- М. Narzibekov (1960–1967)
- М. Naimov (1967–1969)
- K. Mamadnazarov (1969–1976)
- К. Nazirov (1976–1982)
- Н. Shorahmonov (1982–1986)
- М. Ikromov (1986–1992)

The post of Mayor was also preceded in the Tajik SSR by the First Secretary of the Dushanbe City Committee of the Communist Party of Tajikistan, serving as an influential post in Dushanbe. The last Soviet-party leader was Jamshed Karimov, who served from 1989 to 1991.

== List of mayors since 1992 ==
- Mirzotemur Mirzoev (1992)
- Jamoliddin Mansurov (1992–1994)
- Yuri Ponosov (1994–1996)
- Mahmadsaid Ubaydulloyev (1996–2017)
- Rustam Emomali (2017–Present)
