= Mahmadsaid Ubaydulloyev =

Tajikistani politician (born 1952)

- Маҳмадсаид Убайдуллоев
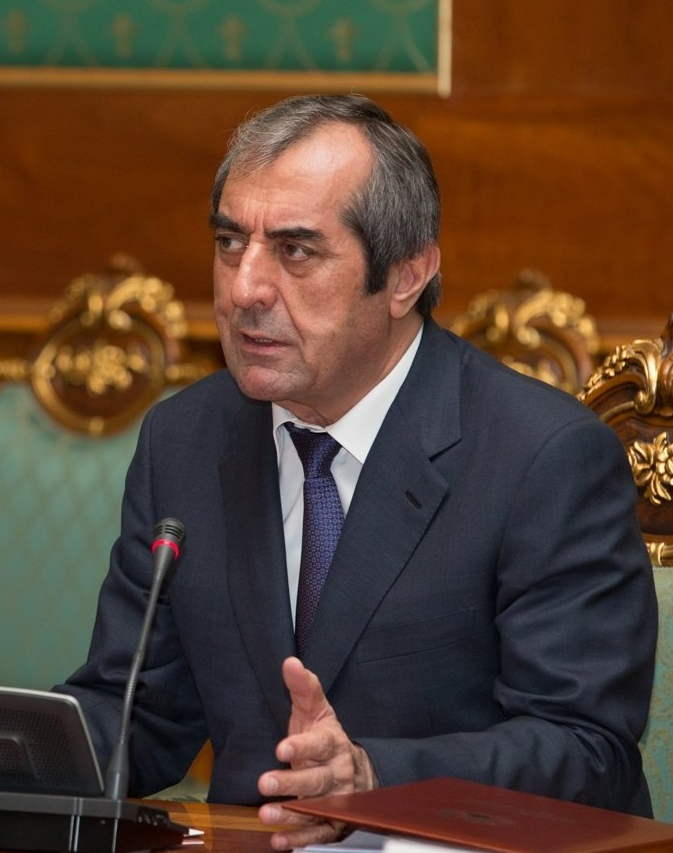
- Ubaydulloyev in 2016

1st Chairman of the National Assembly
- In office 17 April 2000 – 17 April 2020
- Preceded by: Position established
- Succeeded by: Rustam Emomali

Mayor of Dushanbe
- In office 1996 – 12 January 2017
- Appointed by: Emomali Rahmon
- Preceded by: Yuri Ponosov
- Succeeded by: Rustam Emomali

Personal details
- Born: 1 February 1952 (age 73); Kulob, Tajik SSR, Soviet Union
- Political party: People's Democratic Party

Mahmadsaid Ubaydulloyev (Tajik: Маҳмадсаид Убайдуллоев, Mahmadsayid Ubaydulloyev; born 1 February 1952) is a Tajikistani politician who was Mayor of Dushanbe, the national capital, from 1996 to 2017. He had also served as Chairman of the National Assembly (the upper chamber of the Tajik parliament) from 2000 until 2020. He was awarded the Order of Zarintoj 1st Class on January 13, 2016.
