= Order of Glory (Tajikistan) =

Order of Glory

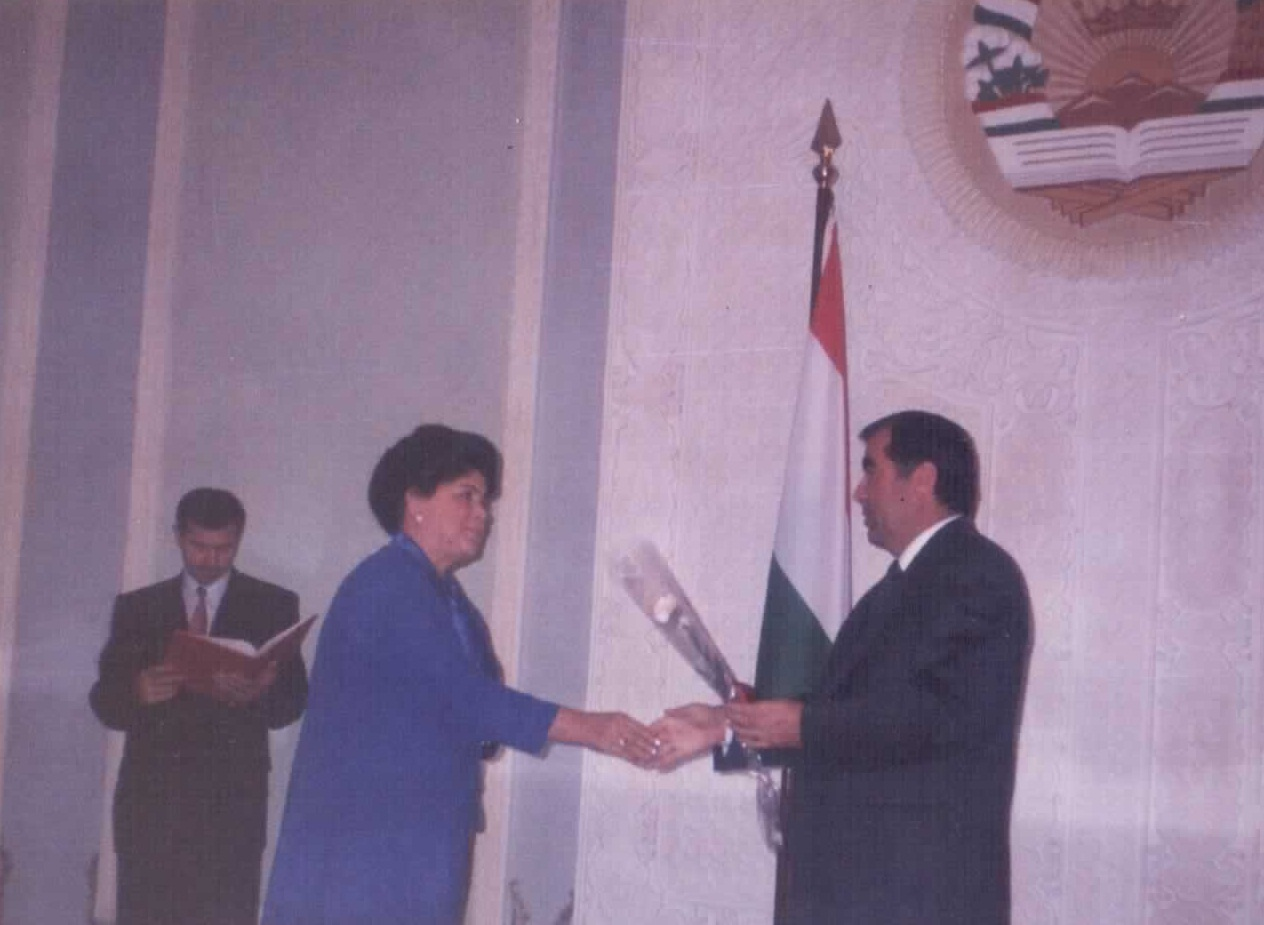
President Emomali Rahmon awarding Deputy Prime Minister Bozgul Dodkhudoeva with the order in 1999.

The Order of Glory or Sharaf Order (Tajik: Ордени «Шараф») is a state distinction and award of the Republic of Tajikistan. It is awarded to people for their services to the development of the economy, social sphere, science, culture and education, exemplary state and military service and fruitful public activity. The Order of Honor has two degrees:

- 1st degree, which is hung with a ribbon on the left side of the chest
- 2nd degree, which is hung with a ribbon on the left side of the chest.

== Recipients ==
- Sirodjidin Aslov (2010)
- Dilshod Nazarov (2015 and 2016)
- Ramil Nadyrov
- Ozoda Rahmon (2015)
- Rajabali Rahmonali
- Rahmonali Safaralizoda
- Vladimir Anatolyevich Yakovlev
