= Tajikistani Armed Forces =

Combined military forces of the republic of Tajikistan

- Tajik: Қувваҳои Мусаллаҳи Ҷумҳурии Тоҷикистон; Russian: Вооружённые силы Таджикистана
- The shoulder patch of the armed forces
- Founded: 23 February 1993; 33 years ago
- Service branches: Ground Forces; Air Force; Mobile Forces; Security Forces ∟ National Guard ∟ Internal Troops ∟ Border Troops
- Headquarters: Dushanbe

Leadership
- President: Emomali Rahmon
- Minister of Defense: Lieutenant-General Emomali Sobirzoda
- Chief of the General Staff: Major-General Bobojon Saidzoda

Personnel
- Conscription: 18 years of age for compulsory military service; conscript service obligation – 2 years
- Active personnel: 9,500

Expenditure
- Budget: US$446 million (2025)
- Percent of GDP: 2.8 (2025 est.)

Industry
- Foreign suppliers: Current: Russia; China; France; India; Iran

Related articles
- History: Civil war in Tajikistan; Insurgency in Gorno-Badakhshan (2010–2015); 2021 Kyrgyzstan–Tajikistan conflict; 2022 Kazakh unrest; 2022 Kyrgyzstan–Tajikistan clashes
- Ranks: Military ranks of Tajikistan

The Tajik National Army, (Note: (Tajik: Артиши миллии Тоҷикистон;Russian: ВС Таджикистана)) officially known as the Armed Forces of the Republic of Tajikistan, (Note: (Tajik: Қувваҳои Мусаллаҳи Ҷумҳурии Тоҷикистон, romanized: Quvvahoi Musallahi Jumhurii Tojikiston;Russian: Вооружённые силы Таджикистана)) is the national military of the Republic of Tajikistan. It consists of the Ground Forces, Mobile Forces, and the Air Force, with closely affiliated forces including the national guard, border and internal troops.

== History ==
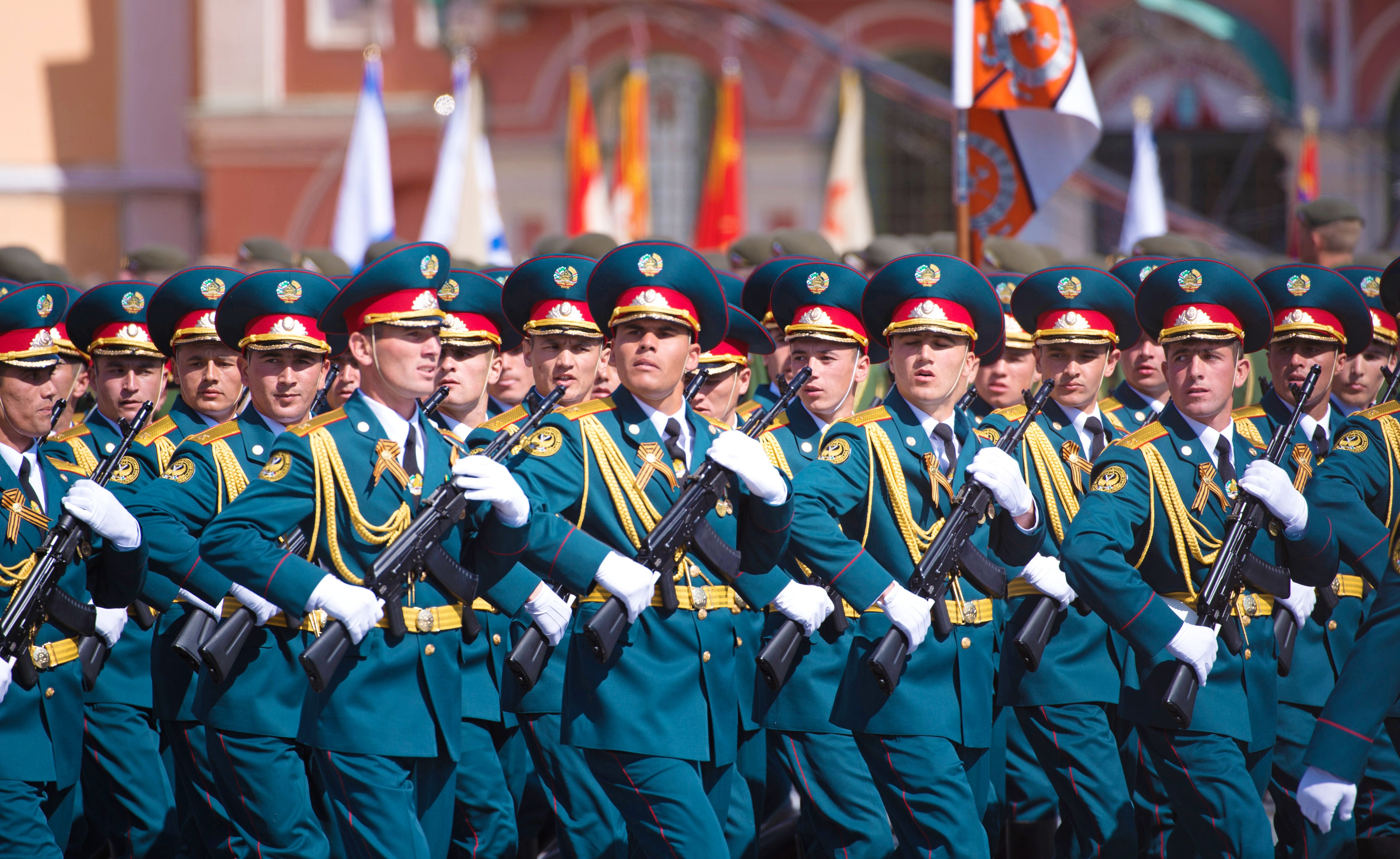
Tajik military personnel at the Victory Parade on May 9, 2015 in Red Square, Russia.

=== Background ===
Unlike the other former Soviet states of Central Asia, Tajikistan did not form armed forces based upon former Soviet units on its territory. Instead, the Russian Ministry of Defence took control of the Dushanbe-based 201st Motor Rifle Division. Control simply shifted from the former district headquarters in Tashkent, which was in now-independent Uzbekistan, to Moscow. Also present in Tajikistan was a large contingent of Soviet border guards, which transitioned into a Russian-officered force with Tajik conscripts. For a long period a CIS peacekeeping force, built around the 201st MRD, were in place in the country.

=== Establishment and the Civil War ===
On 18 December 1992, the Chairman of the Supreme Council of Tajikistan Emomali Rahmon signed the Resolution "On the Establishment of the Armed Forces of the Republic of Tajikistan" on the basis of the Popular Front and the forces supporting the constitutional government. The Popular Front sported paramilitary formations who were armed by former President Rahmon Nabiyev. On 23 February 1993, in the center of Dushanbe, the first military parade of militants of the Popular Front was held, which has since been considered the day the military formed. Due to the presence of Russian forces in the country and the Tajikistani Civil War, Tajikistan only formally legalised the existence of its armed forces in April 1994. During the 1990s, the armed forces were often suffered from a poor commanded structure and poor discipline while their equipment was under-maintained. Draft-dodging and desertion was commonplace. Reflecting the fragmented militia group origin of the army's units, in late 1995 the 1st (led by Mahmud Khudoiberdiyev) and 11th Brigades (led by Faizali Saidov) of the Army exchanged fire several times, and fighting again broke out between the Army Rapid Reaction Brigade (formerly the Mahmud Brigade) and the Presidential Guard in June 1996. Colonel Khudoiberdiev, commander of the Rapid Reaction Brigade was relieved of his command as a result.

=== Post-war to present ===
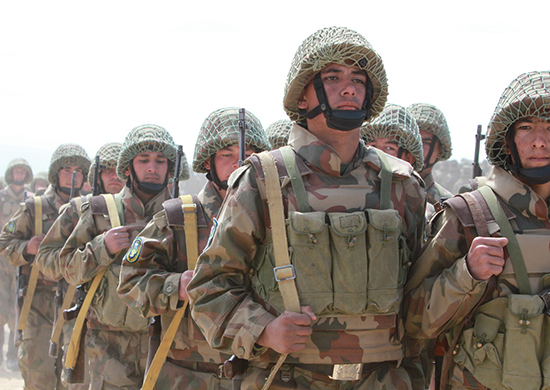
Tajik Army soldiers

Following a 1997 treaty between the Rahmon government and the United Tajik Opposition, several UTO units became part of the National Army, becoming some of its most experienced units. Popular Front units also were incorporated into the Tajik regular army, although many units, such as the First Brigade, maintained its autonomy. Russian military advisors formed a committee in the Ministry of Defense that year that established a system of operational training throughout the armed forces.

In 1999, the first military exercises of the Armed Forces were held in the Khatlon Garrison. In 2001, military regulations were introduced. In October 2005, a military doctrine was also introduced.

In September 2013, the Russian government has given the Tajik military $200 million worth of weapons and hardware, in return for letting them continue to use the 201st base. In late April 2021, forces of the military fought the Kyrgyz military on the Kyrgyzstan–Tajikistan border near Kök-Tash, utilizing heavy artillery. The Kyrgyz Prosecutor General's Office on 30 April accused the Tajik Armed Forces of invading the country and seizing their sovereign territory.

In July 2021, the Tajik military held its largest training exercise in response to the Taliban offensive coming near their borders.

It is reported by Russian Ambassador to Tajikistan Igor Lyakin-Frolov that at the end of 2021, large-scale supplies of Russian military hardware, equipment, weapons and munitions were made to Tajikistan.

== Overview ==
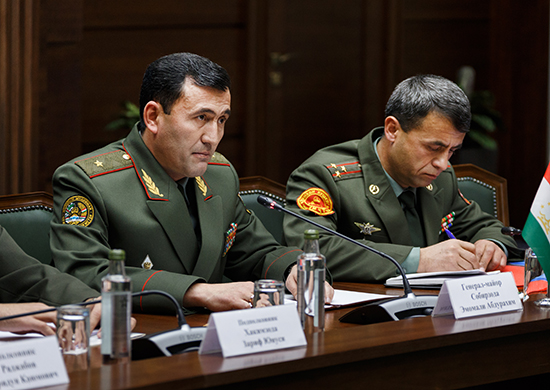
Chief of Staff Emomali Sobirzoda

=== Command ===
The Security Council advises the President of Tajikistan on matters of national security. As Supreme Commander-in-Chief, the President of Tajikistan is entitled to use the Center for the Management of the Armed Forces (opened on National Army Day in 2018), which would serve as the main military command center for the president, similarly to the Russian Armed Forces National Defense Management Center.

The main body of operational command and control of troops is the General Staff, which is responsible for developing mobilization plans and proposals on the military doctrine of the Republic. The plan for the deployment of troops is also developed by the General Staff in agreement with the Government.

=== Personnel ===
==== Military education ====
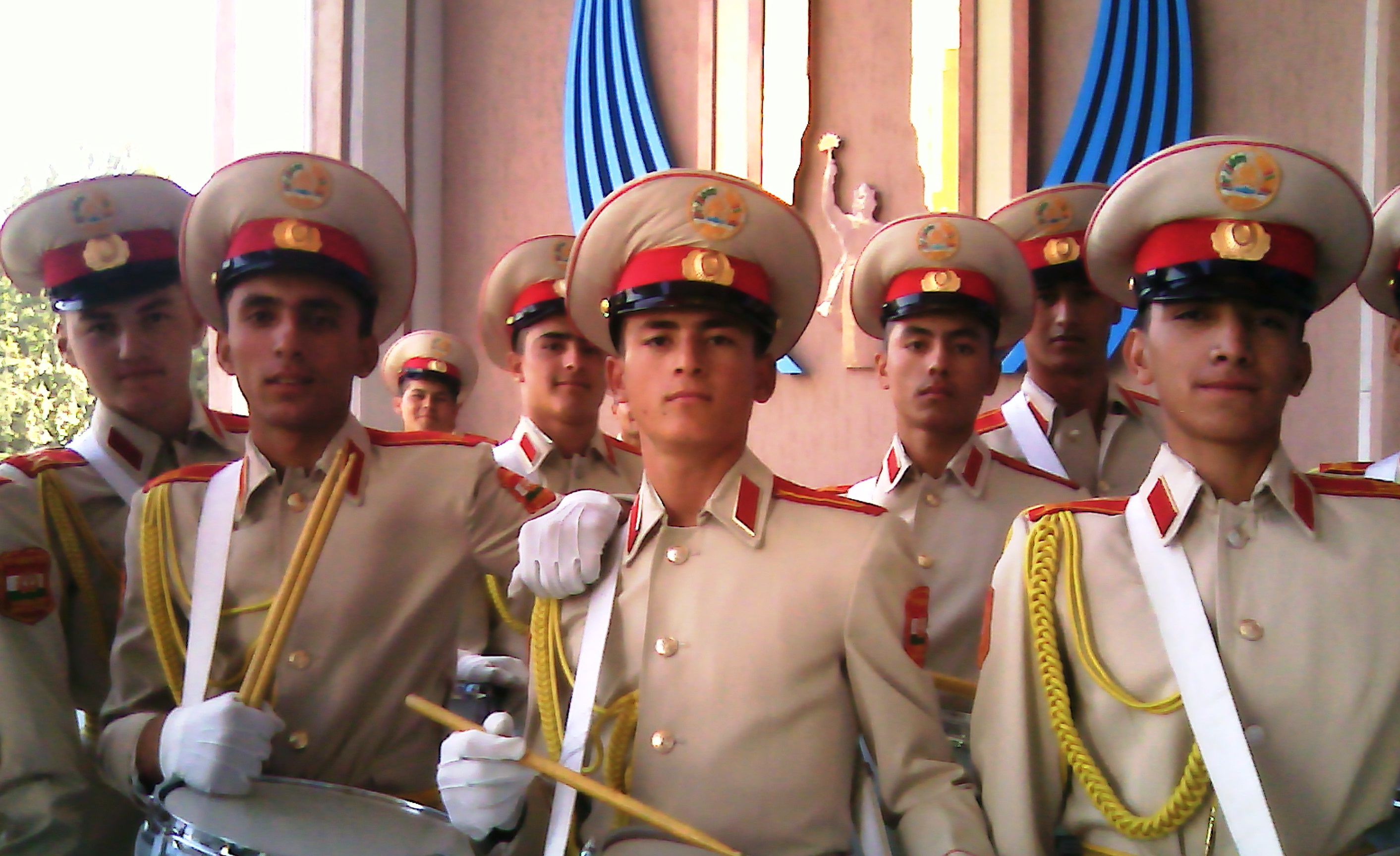
Members of the corps of drums of the military lyceum.

Russia provided much support toward the creation of the national army, and trained command and engineer personnel. An institute of higher military education was created in Tajikistan. Despite the large budget and the adequate training of personnel, the national army was still far from a professional service. Currently, over 100 Tajik military cadets have undergone training at National Defense Academy and the Indian Military Academy in India. Tajiks also study in Kazakhstan, Azerbaijan, China, Pakistan, and the Czech Republic to study, retrain, and improve their professional skills.

The following are higher military educational institutions that are part of the Ministry of Defence and/or other militarized institutions:

- Military Institute of the Ministry of Defense of Tajikistan
- Academy of the Ministry of Internal Affairs of Tajikistan
- Border Troops Academy

Military faculties operate in the armed forces:

- Military Faculty of the Tajik National University
- Department of Military Medicine of Avicenna Tajik State Medical University

The following is for mid-tier officers:

- Karatag National Training Center – Established in 2010 with American assistance. It is located about 30 miles from the capital and is administered by the Tajik National Guard.
- Border Troops Training Centre
- Training Center "Poytakht"
- National Guard Training Center

Secondary institutions:

- Mastibek Tashmukhamedov Military Lyceum of the Ministry of Defense of Tajikistan
- Cyrus the Great Border Troops Military Gymnasium

==== Personnel training and conscription ====
Tajik men aged 18–27 are eligible to be drafted in the armed forces, and are expected to serve up to two years. Public servants such as educators have been exempt from the conscription since the early 2000s. The Armed Forces annually has two training sessions.

=== Regional areas ===
The National Army has five Territorial Defense Zones (Tajik: минтақаи мурофиавии ҳудудии), divided among the Regions of Tajikistan and Dushanbe:

- Khatlon Territorial Defense Zone
- Territorial Defense Zone for Districts of Republican Subordination
- Sughd Territorial Defense Zone
- Dushanbe Territorial Defense Zone
- Gorno-Badakhshan Territorial Defense Zone

They are led by their elected governors.

=== Facilities ===
- Fakhrabad Training Ground
- Chorrukh-Dayron Training Center
- Nurafshon Training Ground (near the city of Isfara and the Sughd suburbs)
- Mumirak Military Base

=== Military Justice ===
Military courts are run by the Ministry of Defense and the National Guard. They are established on a territorial basis at the location of garrisons. Their activity is aimed at protecting the rights and freedoms of servicemen, as well as the interests of military units. A military court consists of the chairman, deputy chairman, judges and people's deputies.

=== Military awards ===
- Medal of the Valiant Border Guard of Tajikistan
- Medal "For 15 years of Impeccable Service"
- Medal "5 years of the Armed Forces of the Republic of Tajikistan"
- Medal "10 years of the Armed Forces of the Republic of Tajikistan"
- Medal "15 years of the Armed Forces of the Republic of Tajikistan"
- Medal "5 Years of the Presidential Guard"
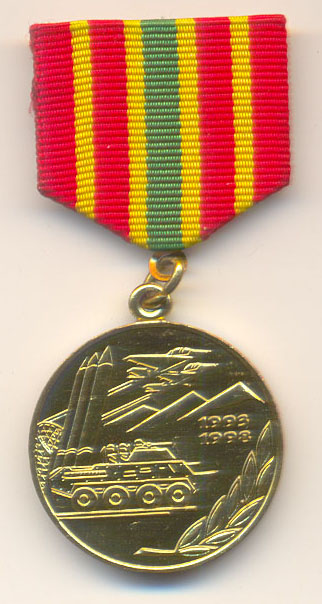
Medal "5 Years of the Tajik Armed Forces"

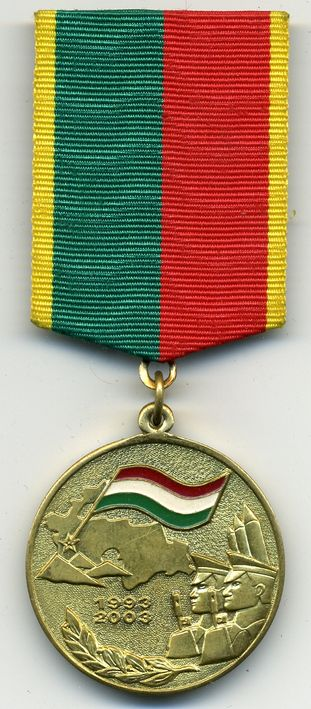
Medal "10 Years of the Tajik Armed Forces"

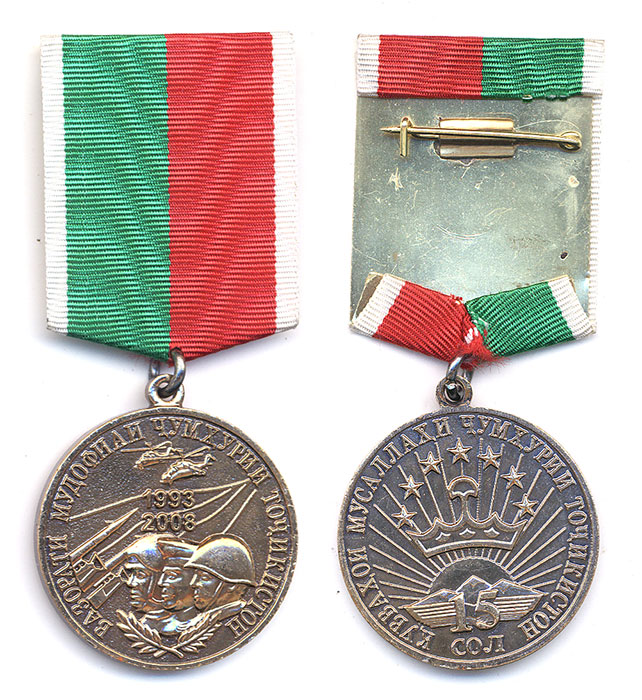
Medal "15 Years of the Tajik Armed Forces"

== Branches ==
=== Army ===
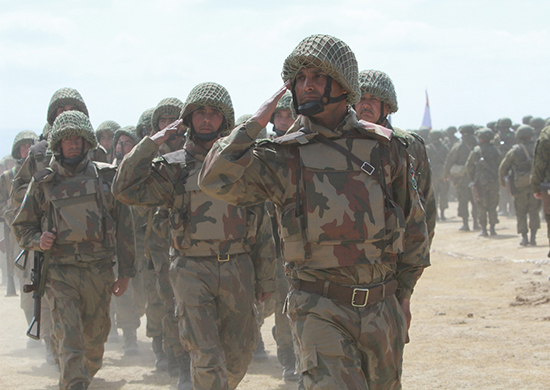
Tajik National Army members

During the Tajik civil war (1992–1993), the Russian government had around 22,000 to 25,000 troops stationed in Tajikistan to help the regime as part of a defense agreement, which is why the Tajik government was able to survive the war. The war was often thought to have been started by Islamic fundamentalists, but more accurately, it was a war between the regional clans and ethnic groups.

By the mid-1990s, the National Army numbered to around 3,000. The majority of the officer corps were Russian, mostly veterans of the war in Afghanistan. The Ministry of Defense of Russia continued providing material support for the National Army. It was especially difficult for the Army to create its own military force because many Tajiks preferred to serve in the Russian Army, due to the higher pay. Because of military opposition in the country, the regime had the largest military buildup in the Central Asian region. As of 1997, Tajikistan had two motorized rifle brigades (one of them is a training brigade), a special operations brigade and detachment (all primarily intended for the protection of the ruling regime), and a combined aviation squadron. Tajikistan further had a basic set of units and sub-units that provide operational, technical, and logistic support.

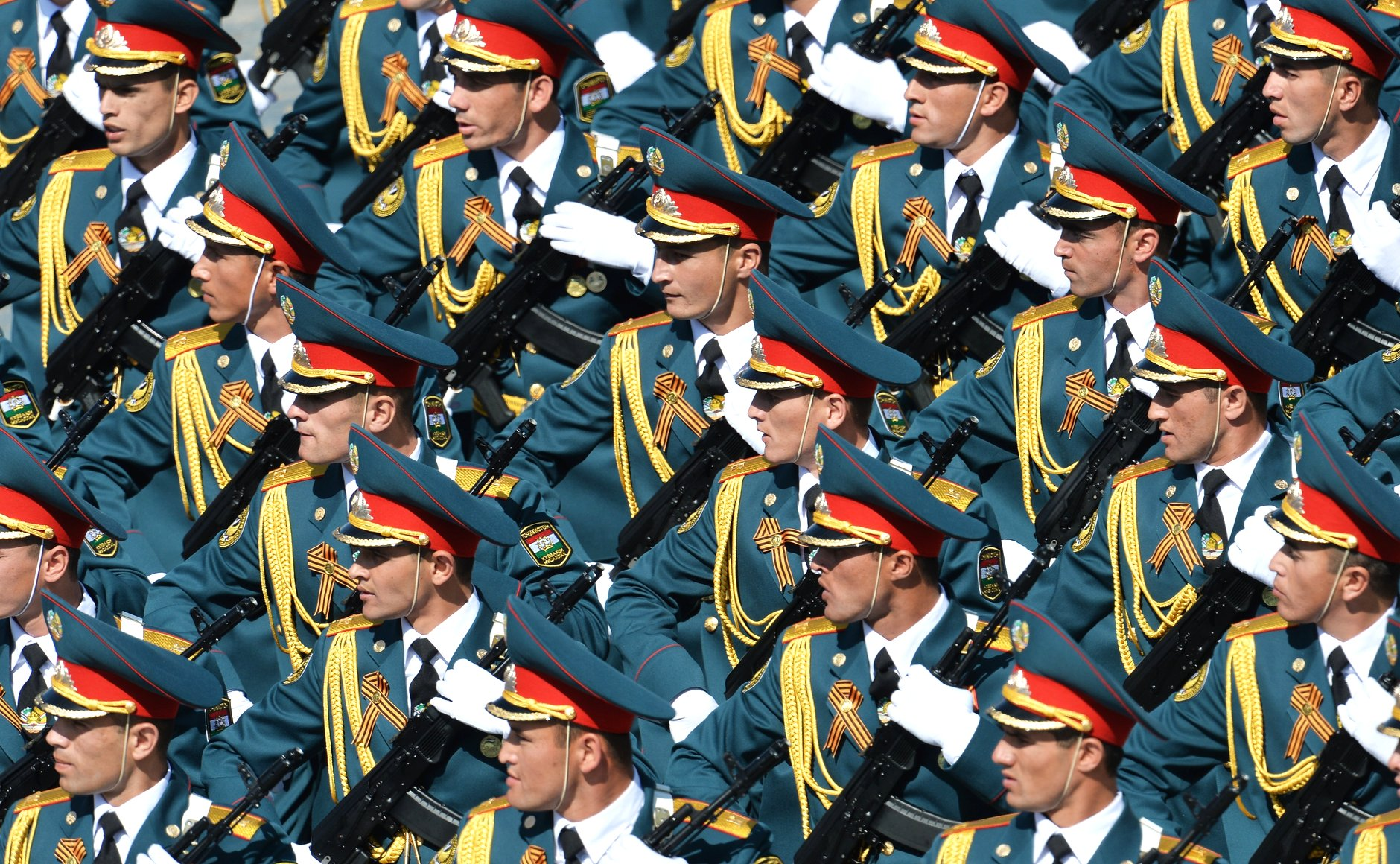
Contingent from the Tajik military during the Moscow Victory Day Parade, 9 May 2015

The Tajikistan army in 2007 had two motorized rifle brigades, one mountain brigade, one artillery brigade, one airborne assault brigade, one airborne assault detachment, and one surface-to-air missile regiment.

=== Air Force ===
Throughout the 1990s, the military did not have an air force and relied on the Russian Air Force for air defense, however, the government planned on making one aviation squadron. In 2007, the Air Force had 800 troops and 12 helicopters. The organizational structure of the Air Force is unknown. Tajik airspace is patrolled by the Russian Air Force.

The Tajik Air Force remains small as Dushanbe doesn't expect an attack on Tajikistan from the air, and that Russian Air Force units at Gissar in Tajikistan and other such Russian contingents in Kazakhstan would detect any such assault. Tajikistan is also patrolled by Russian aircraft as part of the Joint CIS Air Defense System. The air force is mostly used for search and rescue missions, transportation, and the occasional attack on militant groups.

For funding, the government relied upon modest foreign funds. In February 2013, a 20th anniversary parade occurred in Dushanbe, celebrating the creation of the armed forces. During the parade, 20 helicopters flew over the city. India made a deal in which the Tajik and Russian Air Forces share an air base. The base is commanded jointly by Indian, Tajik, and Russian personnel, who rotate units there periodically.

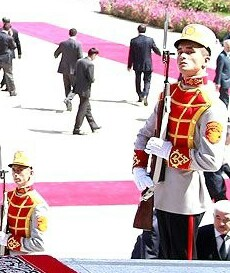
A National Guardsmen.

Because of the civil war, air force development was slow. The first equipment to arrive was 10 MI-8MTBs and 5 MI-24 in 1993 based at Dushanbe. The first transport aircraft were AN-24s(?) and AN-26s(?) were supplied in 1996. A plan from the 1990s to acquire SU-25s from Belarus to form an attack squadron did not occur. However, Moscow did help bolster the Tajik's helicopter contingents in 2006–07 by giving them six Mil Mi-8 and Mil Mi-24 Hind attack helicopters. It also provided four L-39 Albatros.

An accident occurred on 6 October 2010 when a Mi-8, military helicopter from the Tajik National Guard crashed in the Rasht Valley close to Ezgand and Tavildara. The helicopter got caught in some power lines while attempting to land. The helicopter caught fire and crashed without survivors. This is the deadliest accident in Tajik aviation since 1997.

=== Mobile Forces ===
The Mobile Forces are the airborne troops of the armed forces. Similar to the Russian Airborne Troops, whom they perform training with, the Mobile Forces were created with no increase in military personnel by transferring a unit of the National Army. Although they are called paratroopers, the Mobile Forces often deploy out of helicopters, as the Tajik Air Force has few planes. On 4 August 2007, the Ministry of Defence created a Paratroopers' Day to celebrate the Mobile Forces.

== Security Forces ==
=== National Guard ===
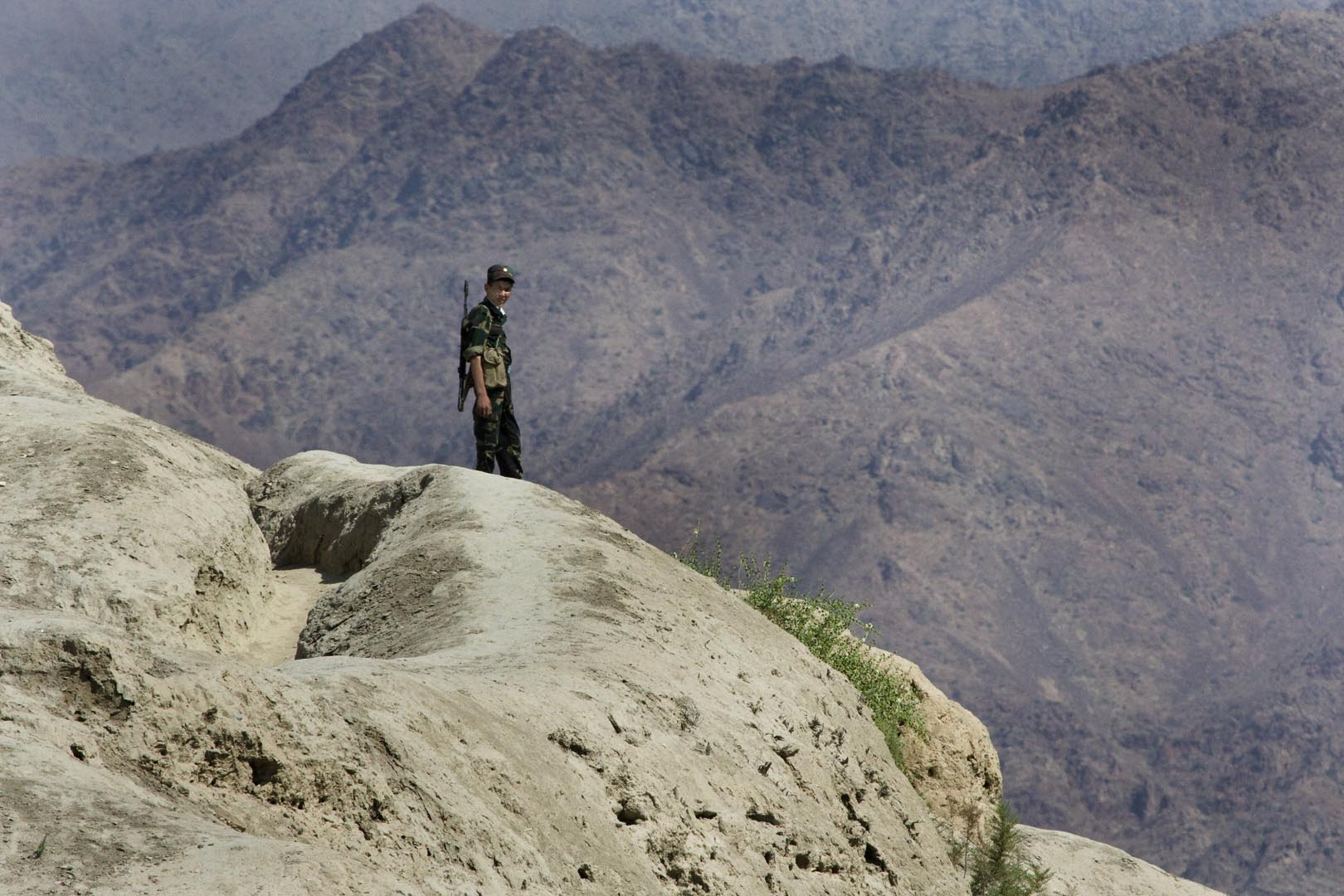
A border guard.

The Tajik National Guard is a special task force under direct command of the President of Tajikistan. Formed on 4 December 1992, it was originally a special forces unit known as the Brigade of Special Mission during the 16th session of the Supreme Council of Tajikistan, under the Tajik Interior Ministry. During its first years, the Guard underwent serious testing, which earned the trust of the President and the people. It was the reason why the President changed it from the Special Mission to the Presidential National Guard.

Their primary task is ensuring public safety and security. Within two years, four additional units were formed in the towns of Chkalovsk, Kalinin, and Obigarm. They had a similar structure to the rest of the military. Worthy of note is the honesty that the National Guard has exhibited. The Rapid Reaction Force, also called the First Brigade, under Colonel Mahmud Khudoiberdiyev, took part in the Tajik civil war, as part of the Guard and the regular Army. The colonel and his men fled into Uzbekistan. On 26 January 2004, the Presidential Guard was transformed into the National Guard.

=== Border Troops ===
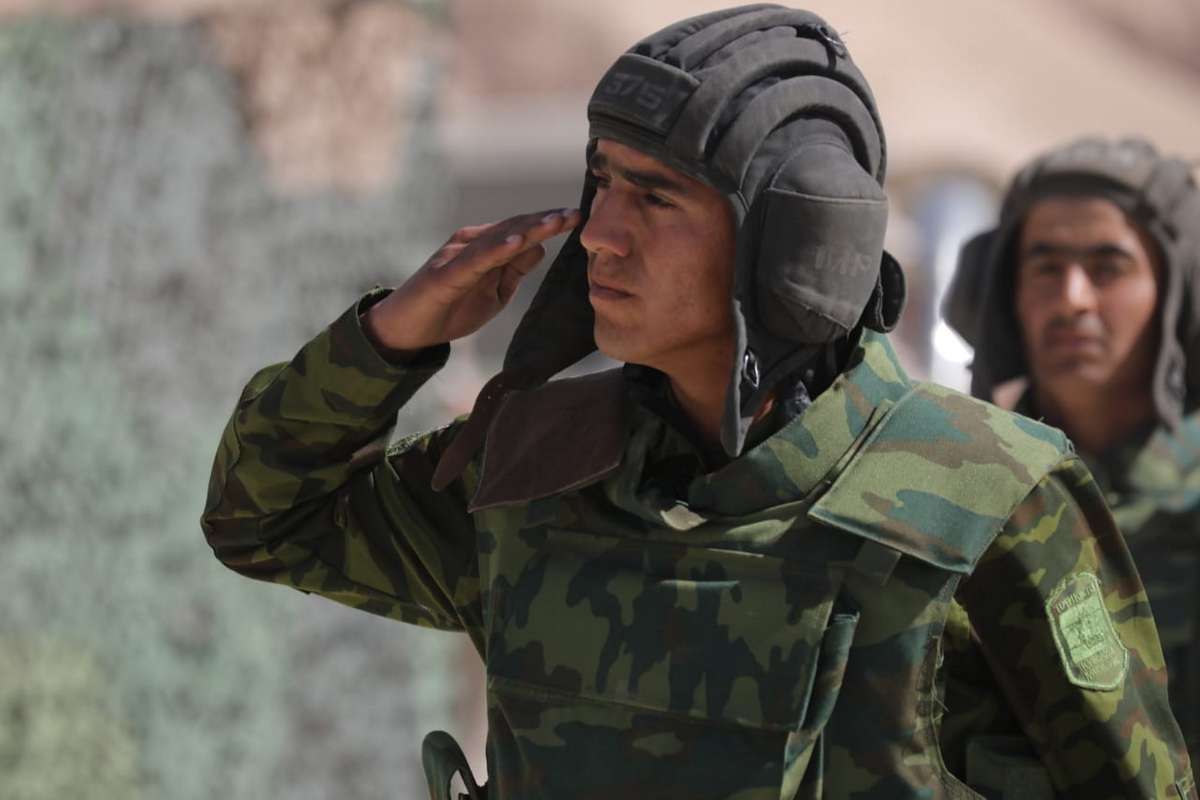
A Tajik army tankist.

The Border Troops of Tajikistan are responsible for border security and operate often with the Afghan Border Police. Development of the border guard is overseen by the Organization for Security and Co-operation in Europe. A Border Troops Academy is located in Dushanbe, while a Border Troops Training Centre is found to the south in the Rudaki District. In 2011, the Border Troops, along with the National Army and Mobile Forces, took part in a joint war game with Kyrgyzstan on the Kyrgyz-Tajik border. The operation involved eliminating two attacking groups of terrorists.

=== Internal Troops ===
The Internal Troops, whose constituting document was passed on 28 December 1993, are tasked with state security, operating under the Interior Ministry. The also act as a reserve for the military, and are similar to the National Guard. They have a similar structure to the military.

=== Committee of Emergency Situations and Civil Defense ===
The Committee of Emergency Situations and Civil Defense is the emergencies and civil defense ministry of Tajikistan. The ministry is authorized to make decisions on the protection of the Tajik population/territory from natural disasters and other geological processes.

== Equipment ==
=== Infantry weapons ===
Small arms
Name	Origin	Type	Caliber	Notes
Makarov PM	Soviet Union	Semi-automatic pistol	9×18mm Makarov	
PSM	Soviet Union	Semi-automatic pistol	5.45×18mm	
AKM	Soviet Union	Assault rifle	7.62×39mm	
AK-74	Soviet Union	Assault rifle	5.45×39mm	
AKS-74U	Soviet Union	Assault carbine	5.45×39mm	
Type 56	China	Assault rifle	7.62×39mm	
SVD	Soviet Union	Designated marksman rifle	7.62×54mmR	
LR2	China	Anti-materiel rifle	12.7×108mm	
PK	Soviet Union	General-purpose machine gun	7.62×54mmR	
DShK	Soviet Union	Heavy machine gun	12.7×108mm	
NSV	Soviet Union	Heavy machine gun	12.7×108mm	
W85	China	Heavy machine gun	12.7×108mm	
RPG-7	Soviet Union	Rocket-propelled grenade	40 mm	

=== Vehicles and artillery ===
Vehicles
Name	Origin	Type	Variant	Quantity	Notes
T-72	Soviet Union Russia	Main battle tank	T-72 Ural/A/AV/B T-72B1	28 3	
T-62	Soviet Union	Main battle tank	T-62AV/AM	7	
BRDM-2	Soviet Union	Scout car	BRDM-2 BRDM-2M	9 22	
BMP-1	Soviet Union	Infantry fighting vehicle		8	
BMP-2	Soviet Union	Infantry fighting vehicle		15	
BTR-60	Soviet Union	Armoured personnel carrier			23 BTR-60/70/80s as of 2024.
BTR-70	Soviet Union	Armoured personnel carrier			23 BTR-60/70/80s as of 2024.
BTR-80	Soviet Union	Armoured personnel carrier			23 BTR-60/70/80s as of 2024.
VP11	China	MRAP		13	Used by the Tajik military police.
CS/VN3	China	Utility		24	
Dongfeng EQ2050	China	Utility			Used by the 7th Air Assault Brigade.
Tigr	Russia	Utility			
Shaanxi Baoji Tiger	China	Utility			

Artillery
Name	Origin	Type	Caliber	Quantity	Notes
2S1 Gvozdika	Soviet Union	Self-propelled gun	122 mm	3	
D-30	Soviet Union	Howitzer	122 mm	13	
BM-21	Soviet Union	Multiple rocket launcher	122 mm	14	
TOS-1A	Russia	Multiple rocket launcher	220 mm	Some	
DongFeng CS/SS4	China	Self-propelled mortar	82 mm		
82-BM-37	Soviet Union	Mortar	82 mm		
120-PM-43	Soviet Union	Mortar	120 mm	10	

=== Air defense ===
Surface-to-air missiles
Name	Origin	Type	Quantity	Notes
S-125 Pechora-2M	Soviet Union / Russia	Medium-range	3	NATO designation: RS-SA-26
S-125M1 Neva-M1	Soviet Union / Russia	Short-range	5	NATO designation: RS-SA-3 Goa
9K32 Strela-2	Soviet Union	Man-portable air-defense system		NATO designation: RS-SA-7 Grail
Akash	India	Medium-range		

Anti-aircraft guns
Name	Origin	Caliber	Quantity	Notes
BTR-ZD	Soviet Union	23 mm	8	
ZU-23M1	Soviet Union / Russia	23 mm		

== Foreign forces ==
Outside the Tajik military, there are also significant foreign forces in the country, principally the Russian 201st Military Base of the Russian Armed Forces. As of 2021, 5000 Russian troops are deployed at 201st Military Base. Stationed at the base are 40 T-72B1, 60 BMP-2, 80 BTR-82A, 40 MT-LB, 18 2S1 Gvozdika, 36 2S3 Akatsiya, 6 2S12 Sani, and 12 9P140 Uragan. A helicopter squadron consisting of 4 Mi-24P Hind, 4 Mi-8MTV Hip, and 2 Mi-8MTV-5-1 Hip is stationed at the base as well. Russia claims to be sending additional tanks and armored vehicles by the end of 2021 after the Taliban takeover of Afghanistan to bolster its forces in Tajikistan. Another country with a military presence in Tajikistan is France, which formerly the Operational Transport Group of the French Air Force. It was designed to provide support to the French contingent in Afghanistan. The base was operated since 2002. In 2005, two French military transport aircraft and about 150 technicians/soldiers were deployed at the Dushanbe International Airport. France used the space free of charge as a result of a bilateral cooperation agreement signed by Presidents Rahmon and Nicolas Sarkozy. The contingent began to pull out in April 2013.

In 2010, India took part in a multimillion-dollar renovation of the Soviet-era Hisar Air Base near the Tajik capital. The completion of the renovation work at the base was marked by a military parade and a visit by President Rahmon. Farkhor Air Base is directly operated by the Indian Air Force. It is the first military base outside its territory. In 2003, Pakistani President Pervez Musharraf raised concerns to the Tajik government over the fact that Indian planes coming from the base would be able reach the border with Pakistan within minutes. The United States government has decided that after ISAF troops pull out of Afghanistan, tens of millions of dollars' worth of equipment will be given to the army of Tajikistan, because the Afghan National Army has ties to the Taliban and is not stable.

Tajik-Pakistan military cooperation began in 2009.

Relations between Iran and Tajikistan have made great progress since 2020. On May 17, 2022, Iran inaugurated a drone factory in neighboring Tajikistan.

== See also ==
- Tajikistani Civil War

== Bibliography ==
- International Institute for Strategic Studies (12 February 2024). "Chapter Four: Russia and Eurasia". The Military Balance. 124 (1): 158–217. doi:10.1080/04597222.2024.2298592. ISSN 0459-7222.
- Jones, Richard D; Ness, Leland, eds. (2010). Jane's Infantry Weapons 2010-2011 (36th ed.). Surrey: Jane's Information Group. ISBN 978-0-7106-2908-1.

== References and links ==
- Jane's Information Group, Jane's World Armies, 2004 edition
- United Nations Secretary-General's reports on UNMOT, 1990s
- CIA World Factbook page
- Ҳифзи Ватан
