= Military Institute of the Ministry of Defense of Tajikistan =

Military academy in Tajikistan

- Донишкадаи ҳарбии Вазорати мудофиа
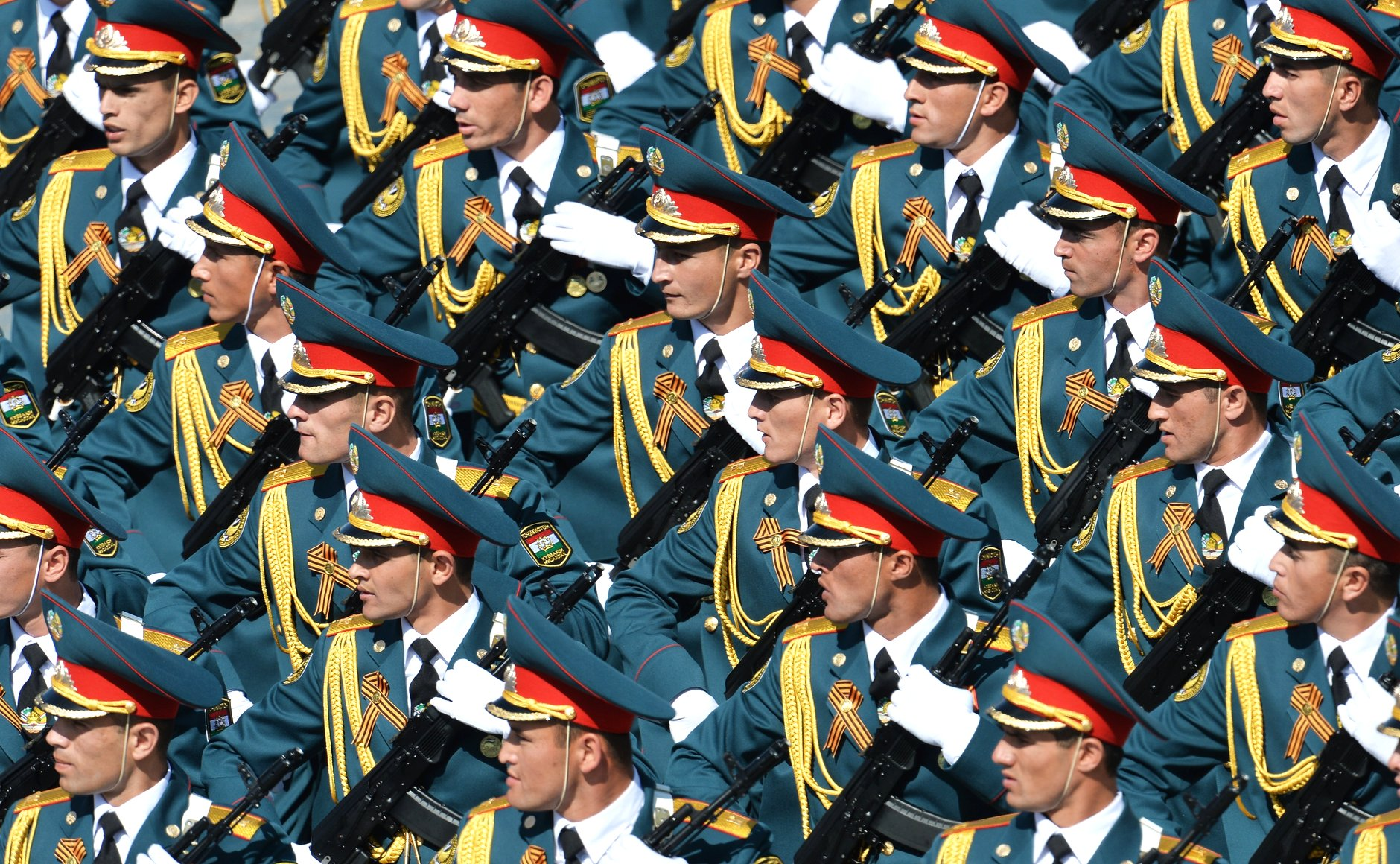
- The cadets of the school (led by Colonel Ilkhom Makhsumov) participating in the 2015 Moscow Victory Day Parade.
- Former name: Military Engineering College
- Type: military academy
- Established: 1993
- Founders: Ministry of Defence; Council of Ministers
- Affiliations: Armed Forces of the Republic of Tajikistan
- Commandant: Hafiz Azizzoda
- Location: Dushanbe, Tajikistan
- Language: Tajik, Russian

The Military Institute of the Ministry of Defense of Tajikistan is a higher military educational institution in the national education system of the Armed Forces of the Republic of Tajikistan. It was formerly named after Sangak Safarov, who served as the head of the Popular Front of Tajikistan.

== History ==
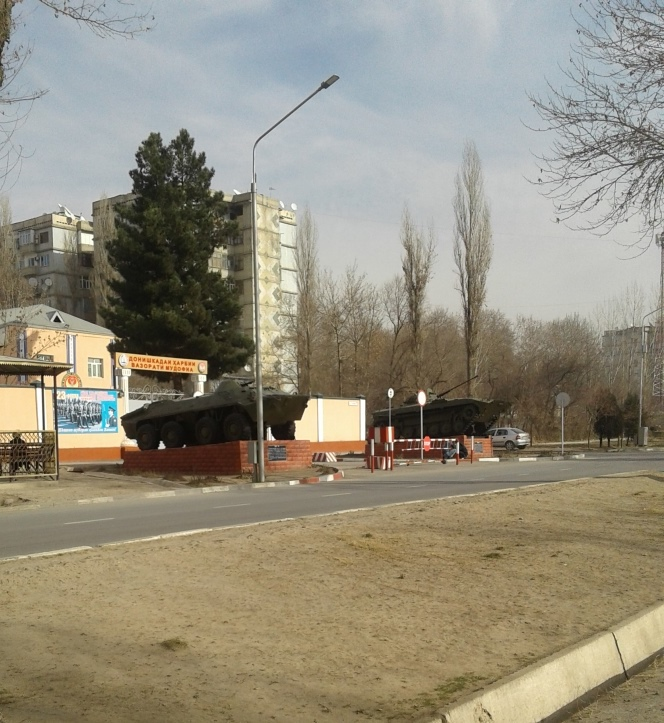
The entrance to the institute.

On 29 September 1992, by decree of the Council of Ministers, the academy was established as the Military Commander Engineering Military College. The first group of cadets of the institute began their training for the first time on 23 February 1993, which was the day when the Armed Forces of the Republic of Tajikistan were formed. The college's establishment would prove to be essential to deal with the country's internal conflicts, such as the Tajikistani Civil War. On 30 April 2002, the school was transformed into the Military Institute of the Ministry of Defense by order of President Emomali Rahmon. The order became effective the following school year on 1 September.

== Academics ==
It has a state license of the Ministry of Education of Tajikistan giving it the right to conduct educational activities in the field of higher education. The military academy specializes in the enhancement of physical strength, military-political knowledge, and a wide range of capacities to increase the number of professional officers in the military units of the country. The cadets, who become commissioned Lieutenants upon graduation, are given seven specialties: gunners, motorized riflemen, tank commanders, infantry fighting vehicles, armored personnel carriers, as well as platoon commanders of engineering units.

Since 2004, the institute has operated a military aviation department for members of the Tajik Air Force, graduating 150 officers by 2008.

== Students and alumni ==
The Ministry of Defense invites young men aged 18 to 21 to study at the Military Institute. Military Institute alumni now constitute more than 70% of the commissioned staff of the armed forces. Many graduates are sent to military universities in the Russia, India, Kazakhstan, Uzbekistan and Azerbaijan. 40 cadets from Afghanistan have studied within the walls of this educational institution.

== Campus and facilities ==
At present, the Military Institute has special educational buildings:

- Dormitory
- Sports Field
- Medical Clinic
- Conference Hall
- Library
- Museum "Honor of War" (Осорхонаи шарафи ҷангии шаҳри Душанбе)
- Car Park
- Shooting Range
- Tactical Field
- Military Music Band
- Training Center

=== Flight Department ===
The flight department has 12 training classes with 250 seats, 9 workrooms for officers and teachers, a sports hall, a student dormitory, a personnel lounge, and a warehouse for storing weapons and military equipment. The cost of building the four-story building amounted to over 453,000 USD (four million Tajik somoni).

== Organization ==
The Military Institute operates the following:

- 3 faculties
- 10 departments
- Khujand Branch

== Activities ==
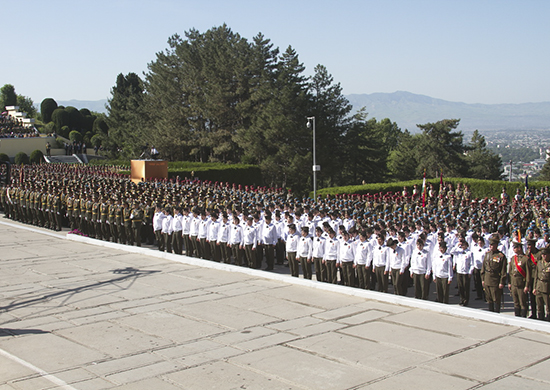
Male and female cadets of the institute on parade in Victory Park.

In 2010, for the first time, 75 cadets of the Military Institute took part in the Victory Parade in Moscow. It consisted of the command group (3 officers), a color guard carrying the Flag of Tajikistan (3 cadets) and a parade team (64 cadets). It later took part in the 2015 parade, and in 2020, an alumni company took part in the parade. In 2018, Subbotnik was performed by members of the institute in Khujand. In early 2020, a delegation from the Aviation Department visited the Higher Military Aviation School of Uzbekistan.

== Commandants ==
- Major-General Hokimsho Hofizov (1998–27 January 2006)
- Major-General Fayzali Sharifzoda (2006–2015)
- Major-General Ahliddin Majidov (2015–2020)
- Hafiz Azizzoda (2020–Present)
