= Military ranks of Tajikistan =

The Military ranks of Tajikistan are the military insignia used by the Armed Forces of the Republic of Tajikistan. Being a former member of Soviet Union, Tajikistan shares a rank structure similar to that of Russia. Tajikistan is a landlocked country, and does therefore not possess a navy.

== Commissioned officer ranks ==
The rank insignia of commissioned officers.

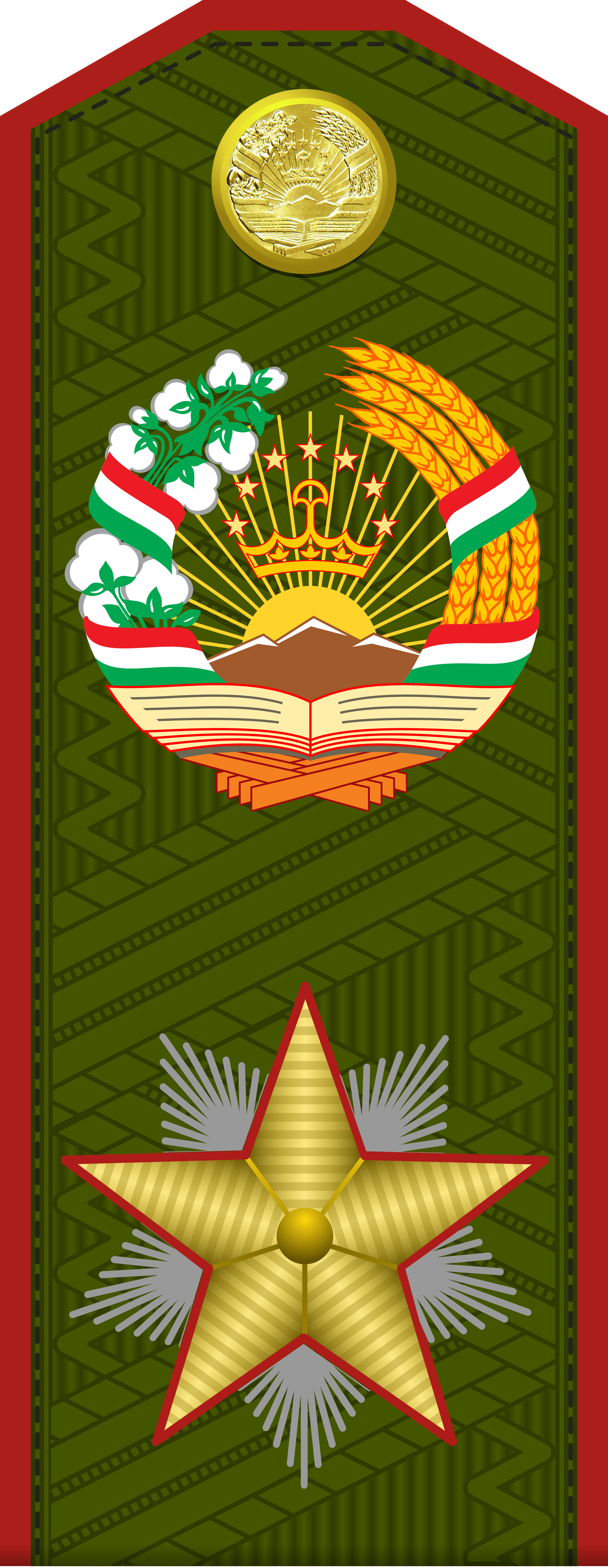
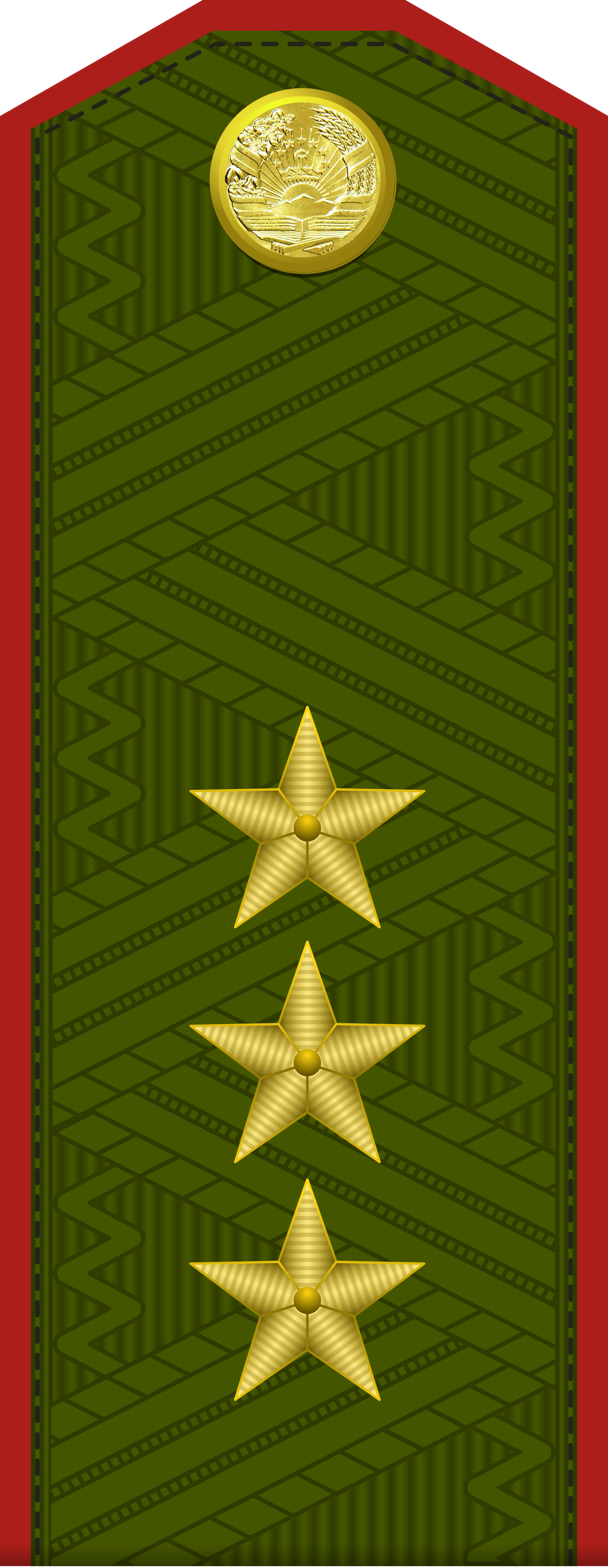
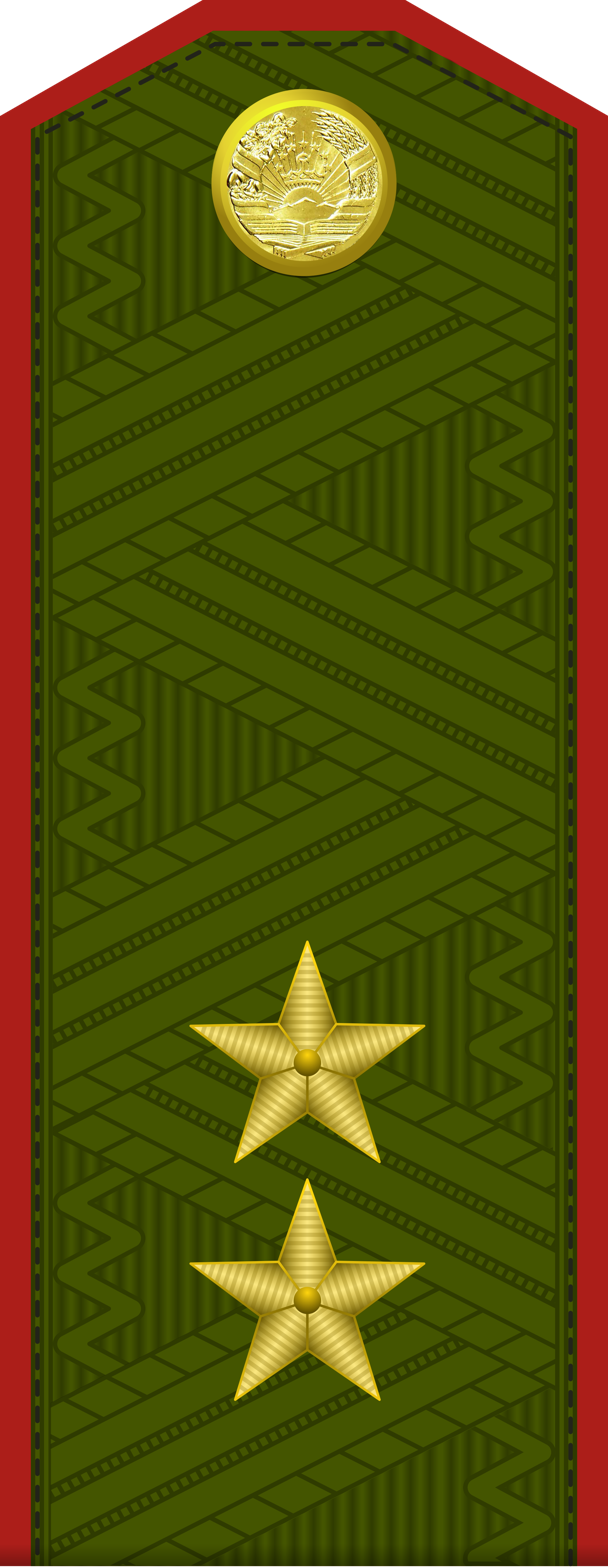
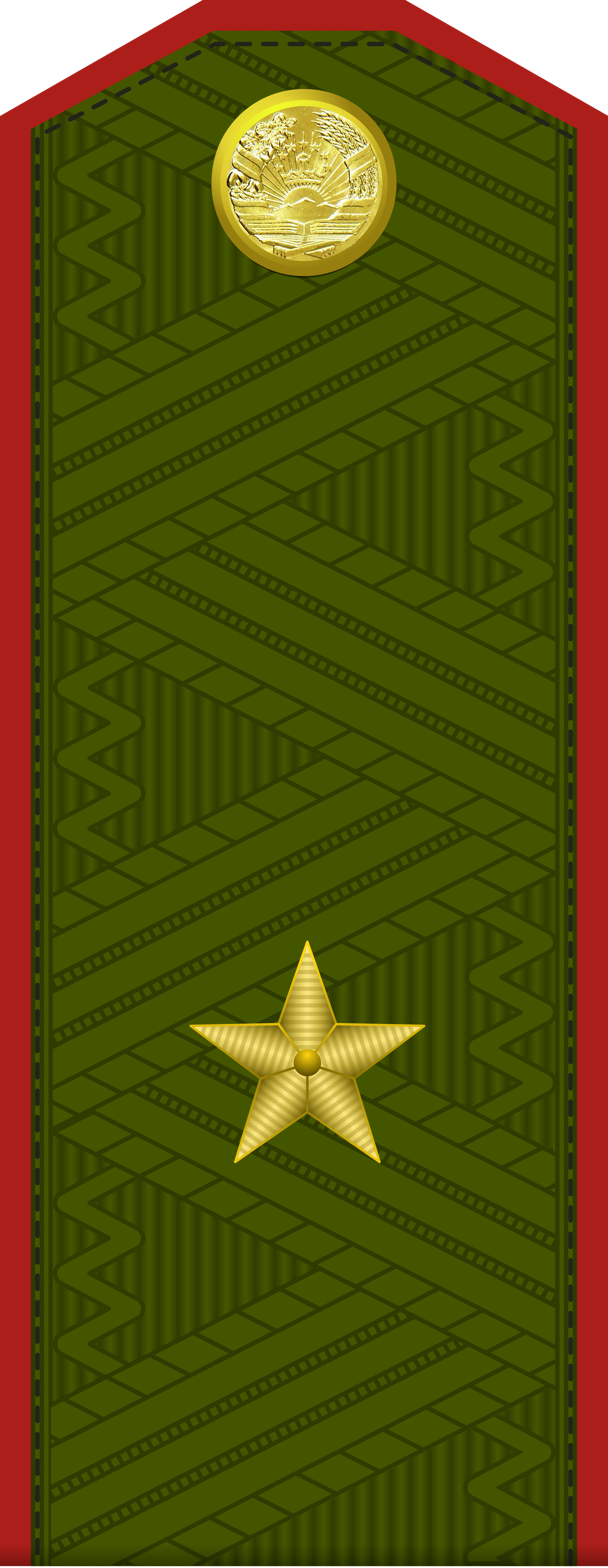
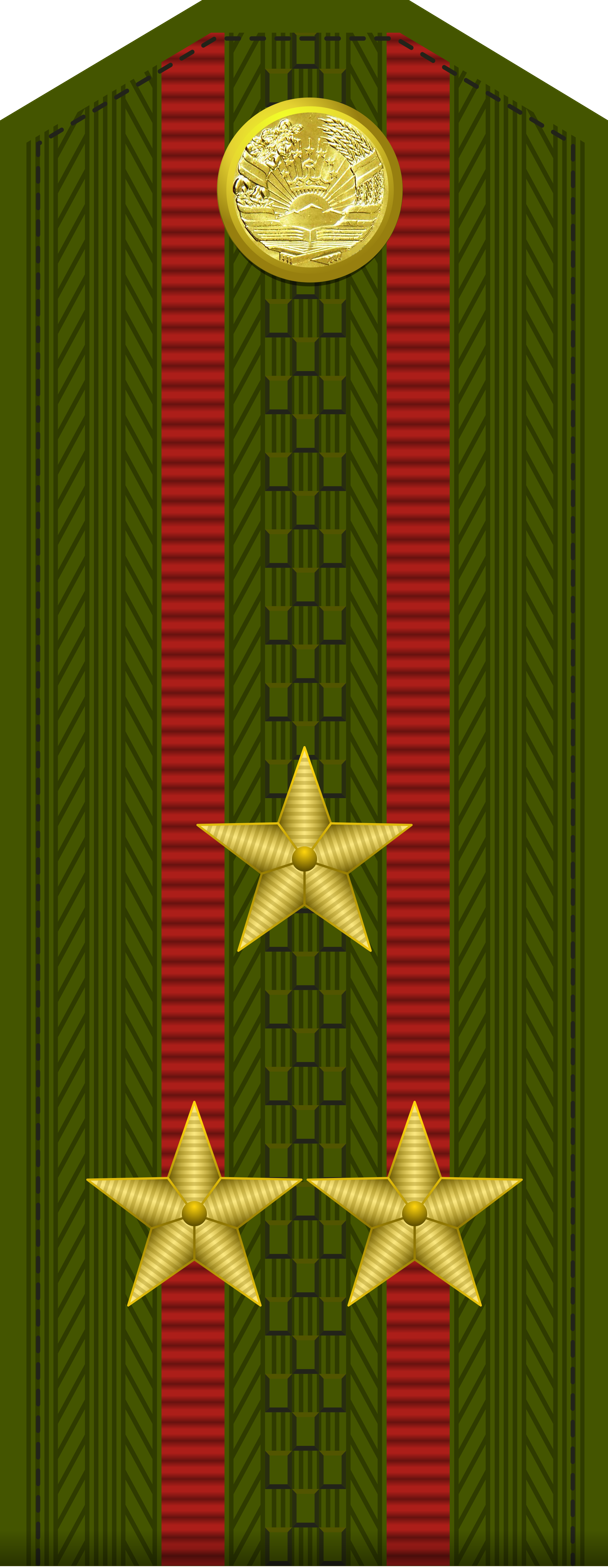
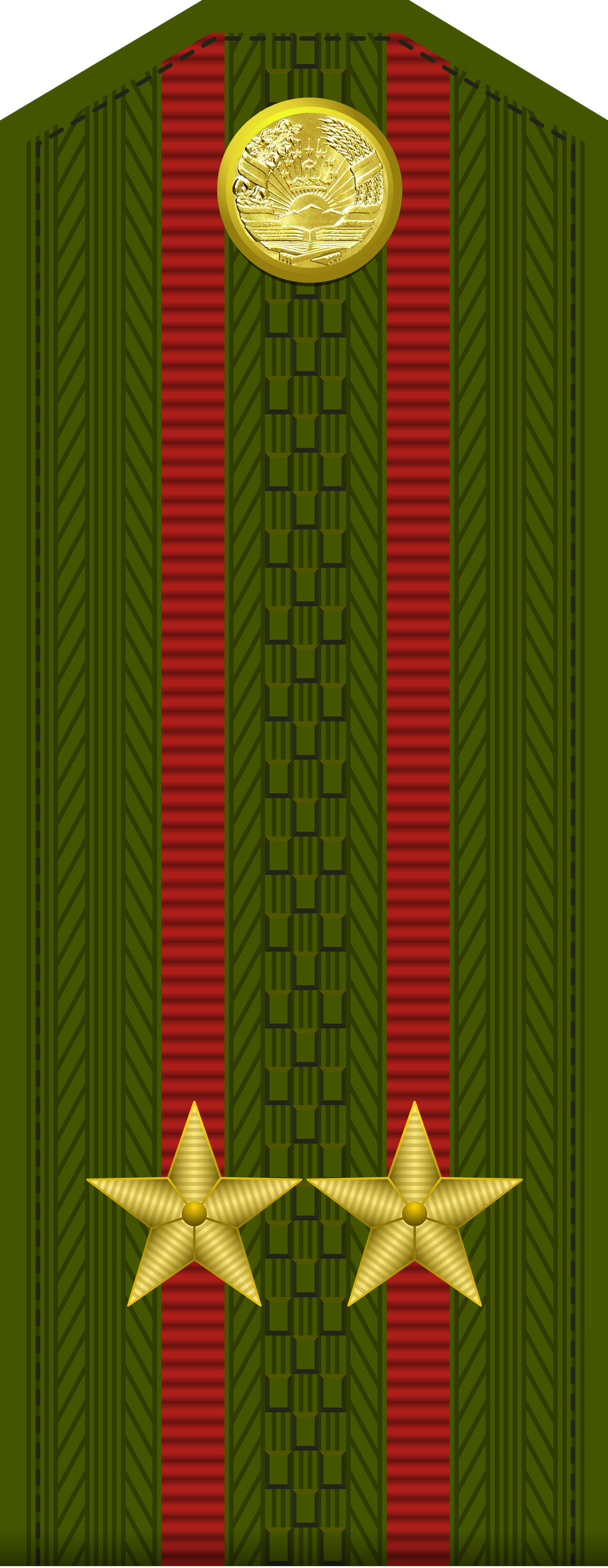
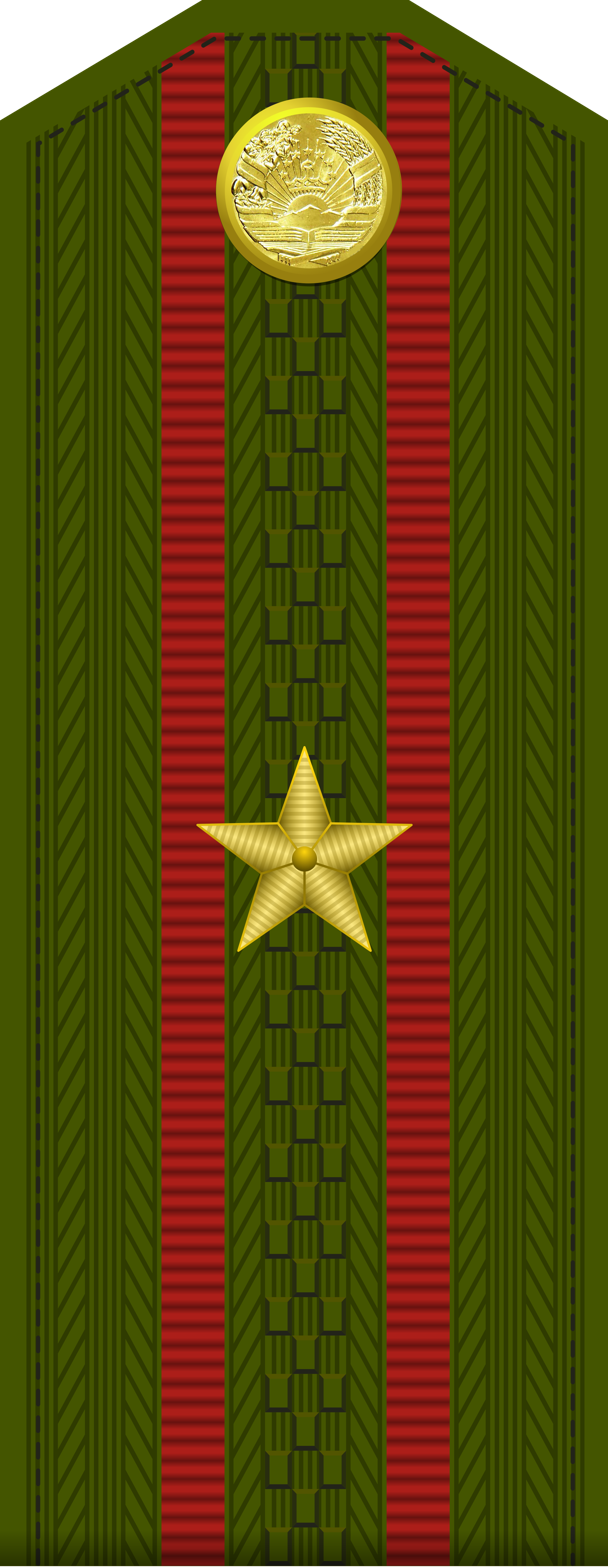
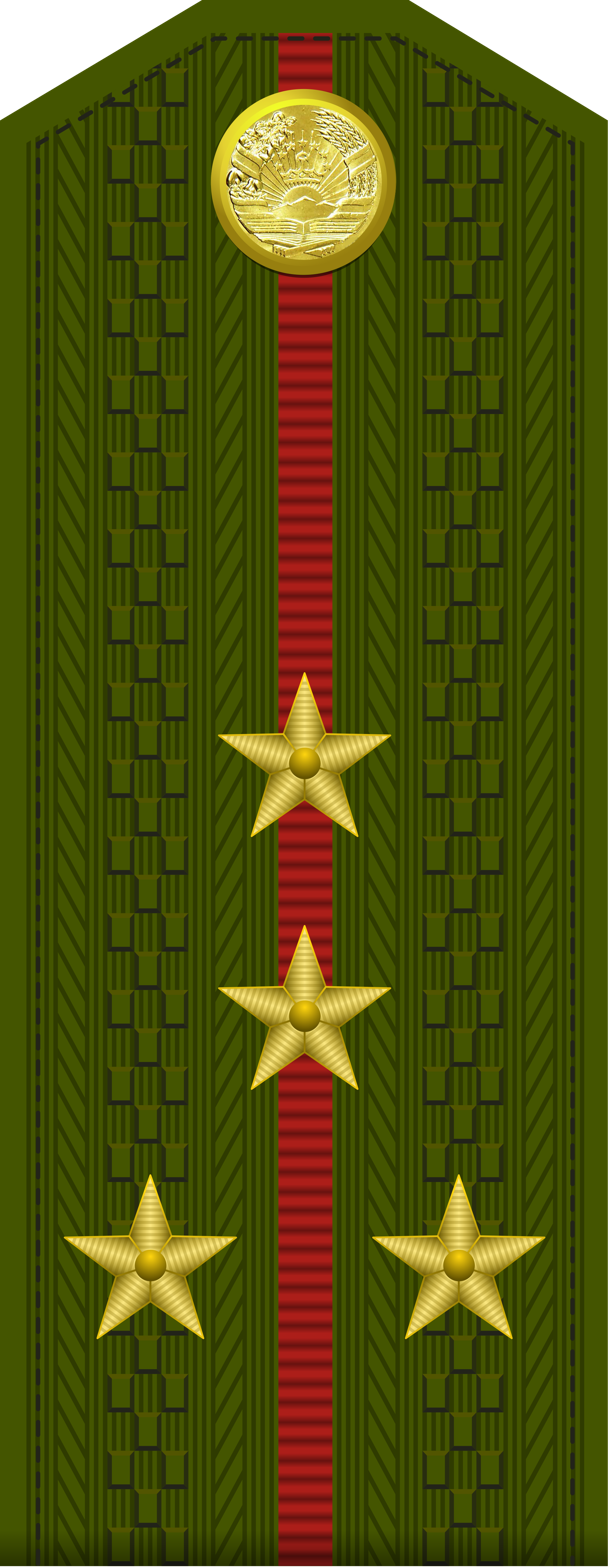
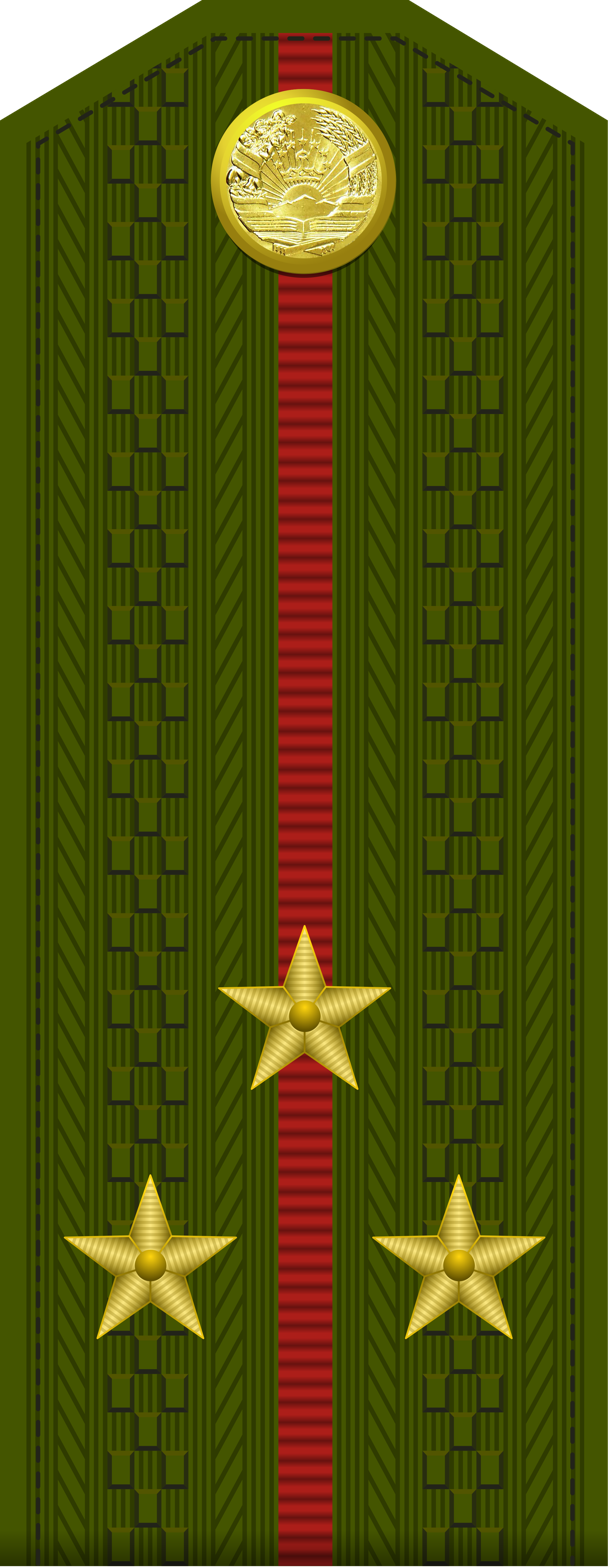
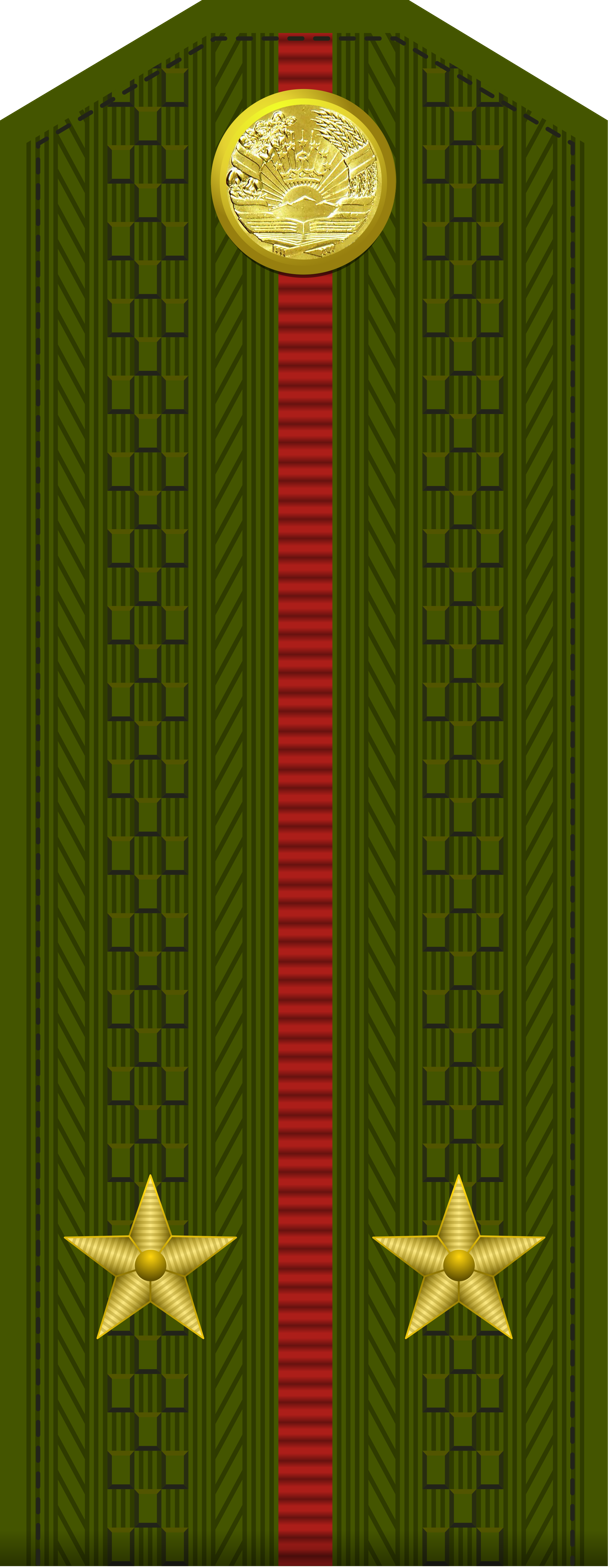
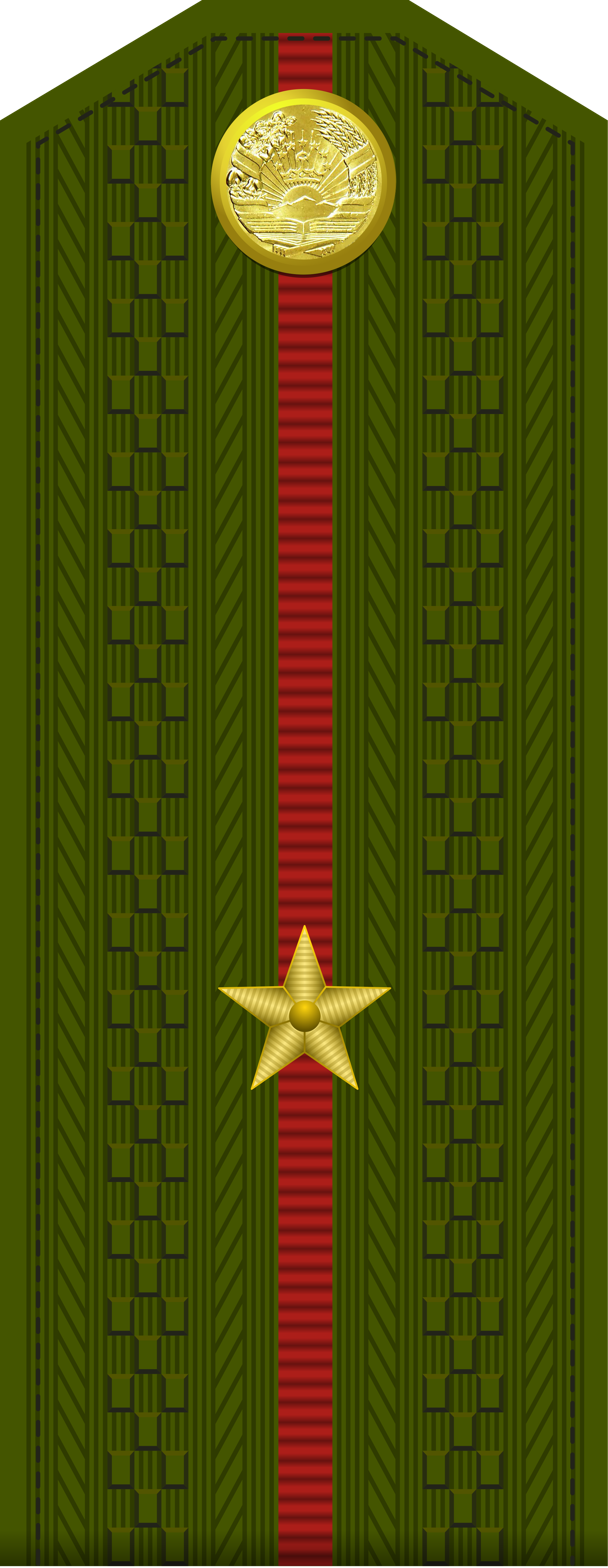
Rank group	General / flag officers				Senior officers			Junior officers
Tajik Ground Forces
Tajik Ground Forces	Генерали артиш Generali artish	Генерал-полковник; General-polkovnik	Генерал-лейтенант; General-leytenant	Генерал-майор; General-mayor	Полковник; Polkovnik	Подполковник; Podpolkovnik	Майор; Mayor	Капитан; Kapitan	Лейтенанти калон Leytenanti kalon	Лейтенант; Leytenant	Лейтенанти хурд Leytenanti xurd
Tajik Air Force
Tajik Air Force		Генерал-полковник; General-polkovnik	Генерал-лейтенант; General-leytenant	Генерал-майор; General-mayor	Полковник; Polkovnik	Подполковник; Podpolkovnik	Майор; Mayor	Капитан; Kapitan	Лейтенанти калон Leytenanti kalon	Лейтенант; Leytenant	Лейтенанти хурд Leytenanti xurd
Rank group	General / flag officers				Senior officers			Junior officers

== Other ranks ==
The rank insignia of non-commissioned officers and enlisted personnel.

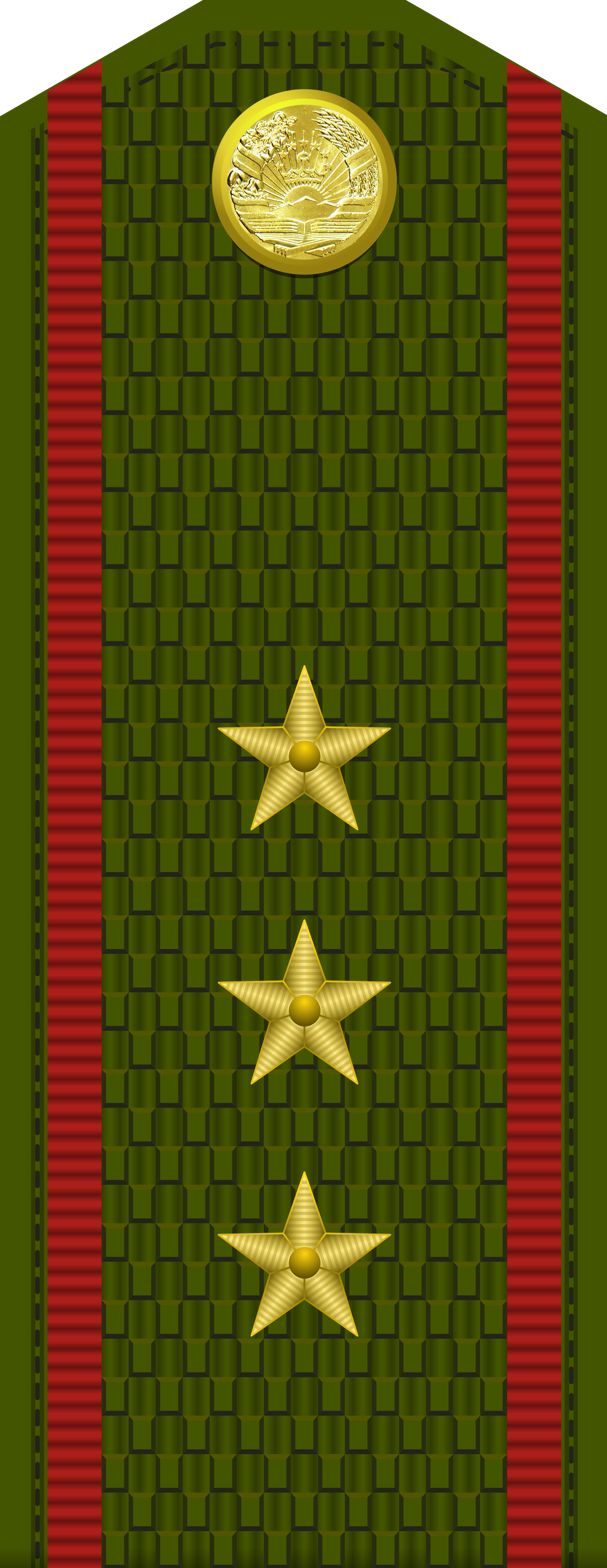
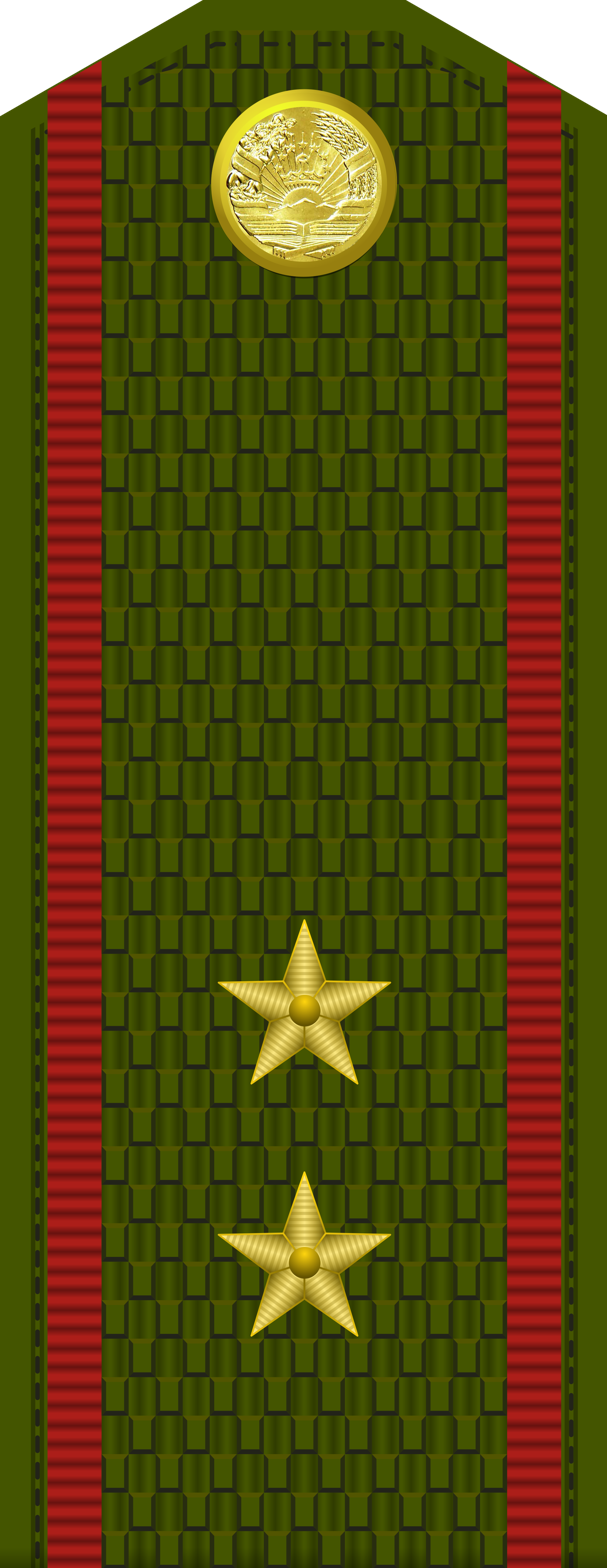
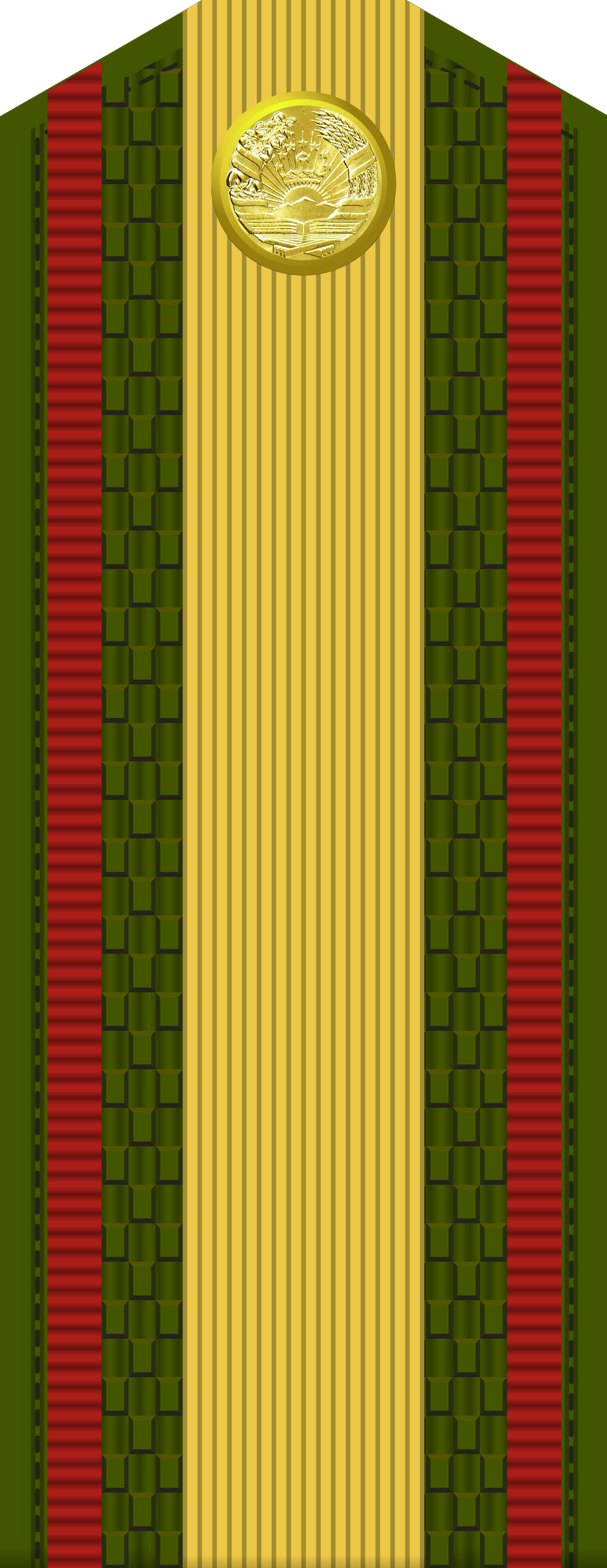
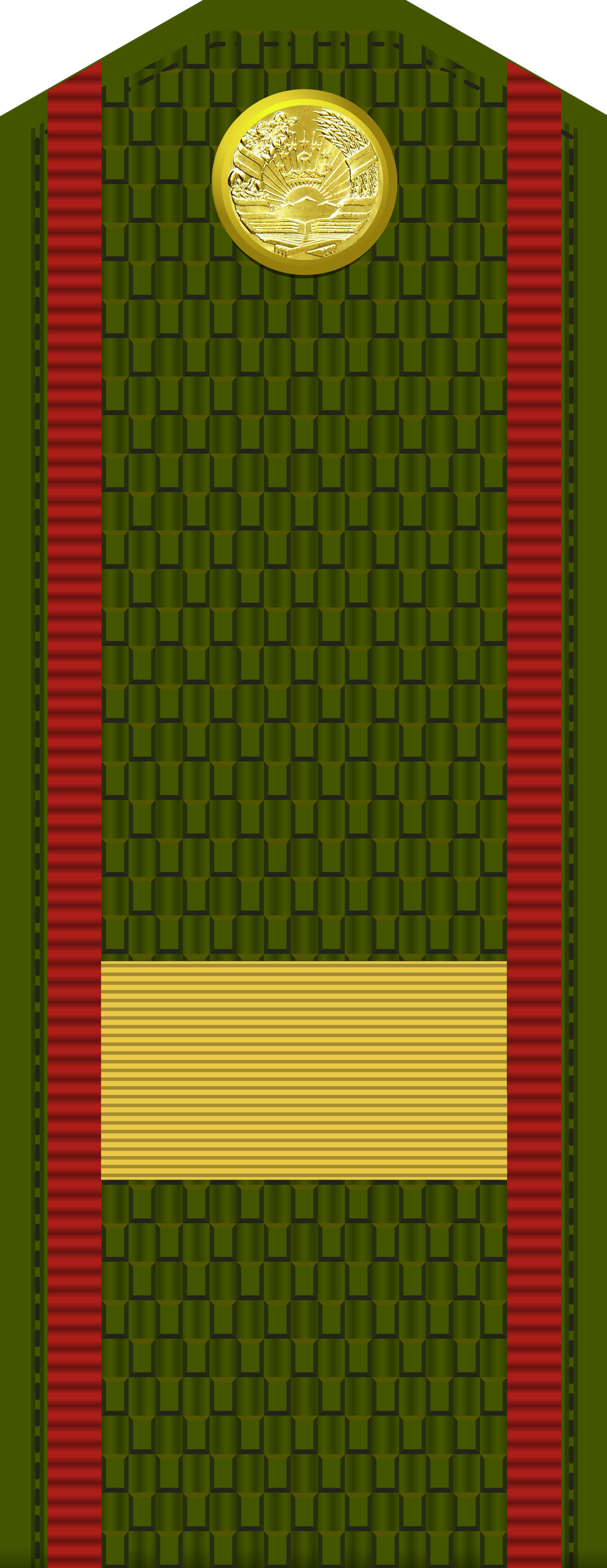
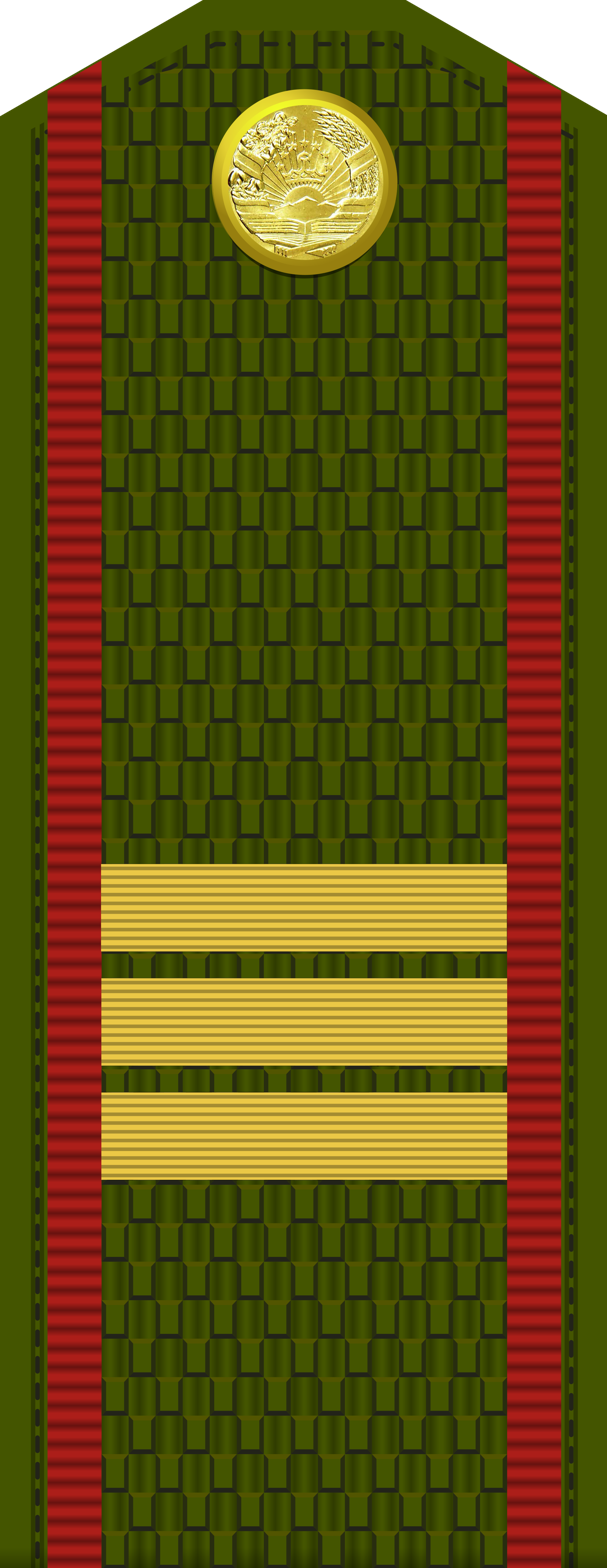
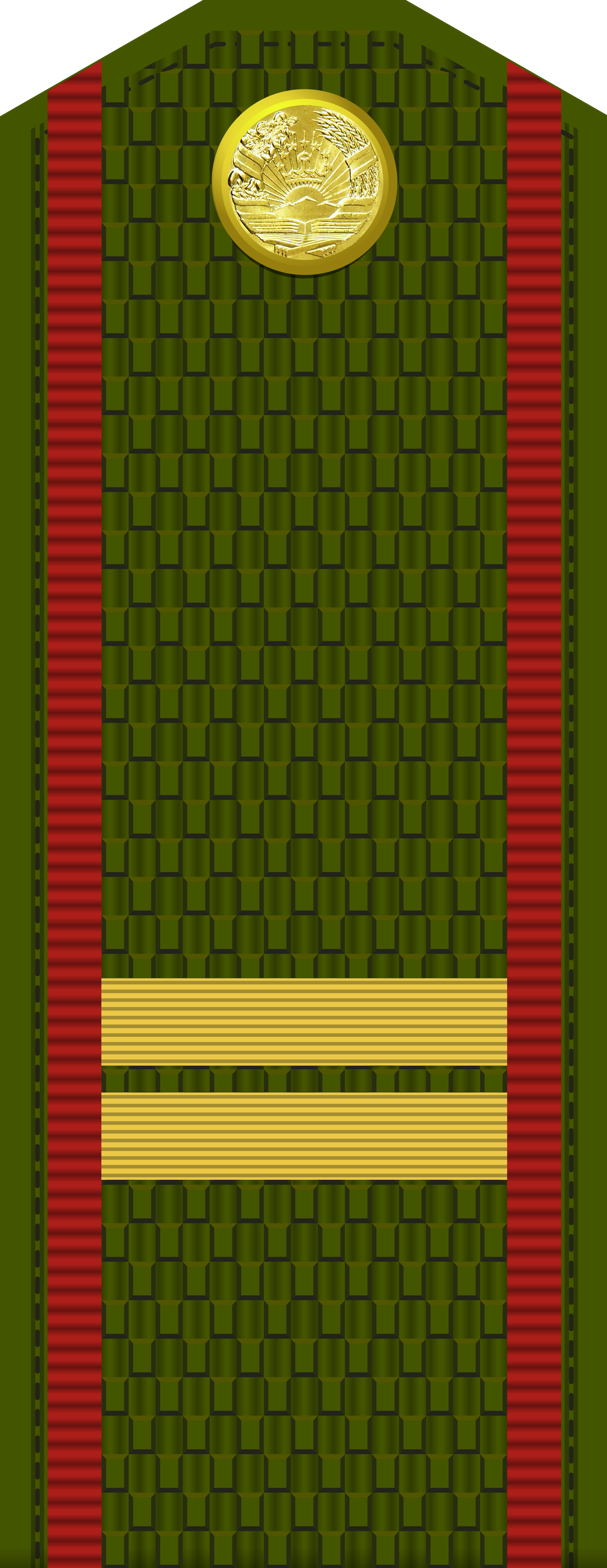
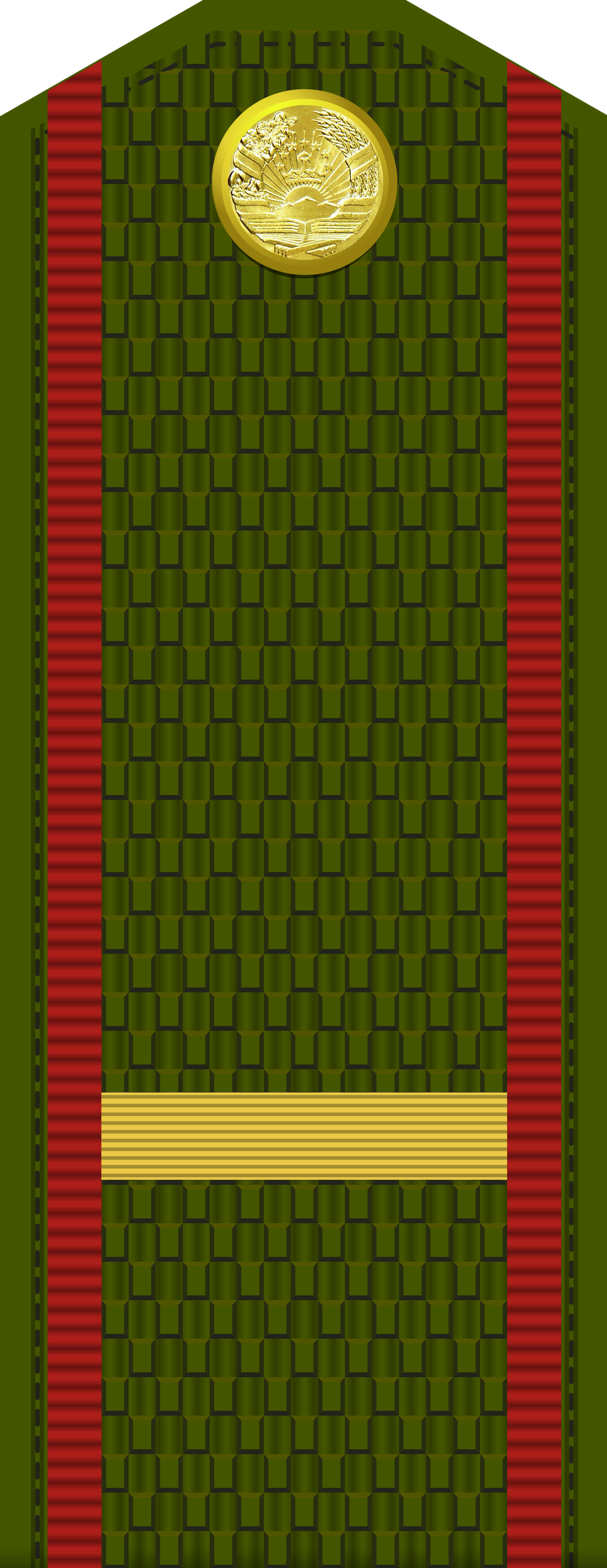
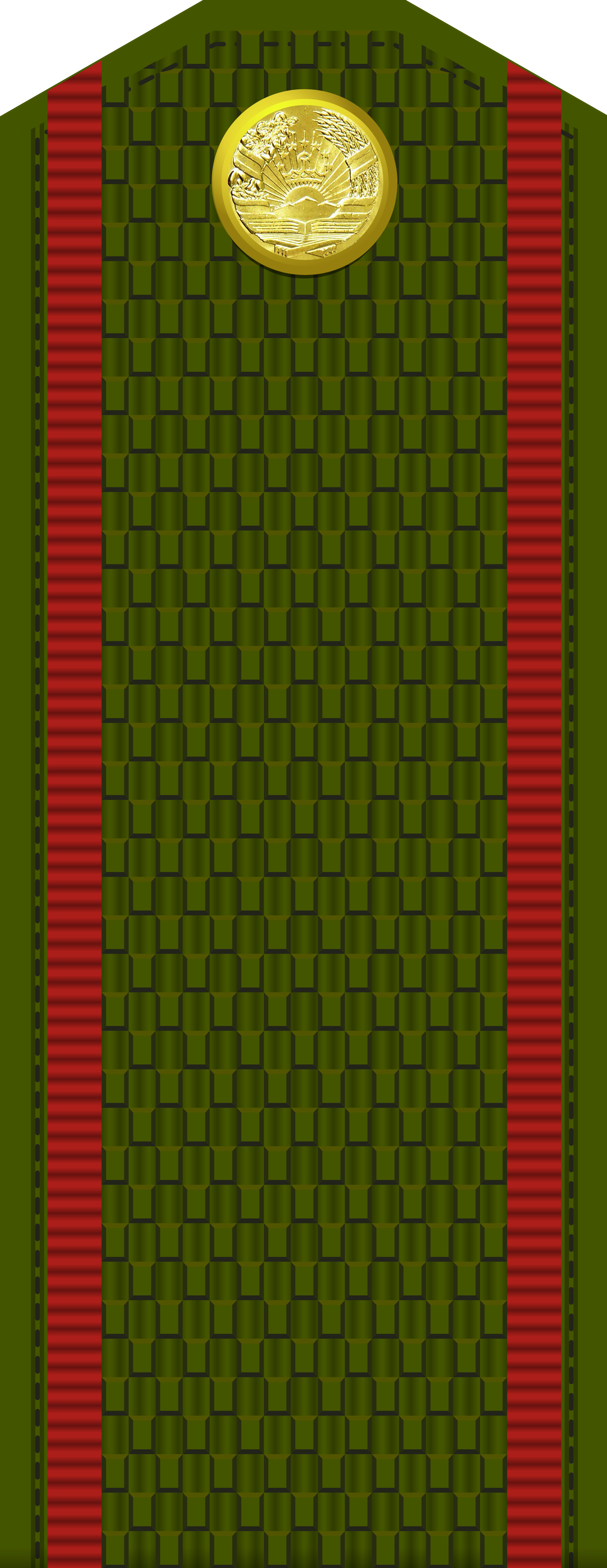
Rank group	Senior NCOs						Junior NCOs	Enlisted
Tajik Ground Forces
Tajik Ground Forces	Прапоршики калон Praporshiki kalon	Прапоршик; Praporshik	Старшина; Starshyna	Сержанти калон Serzhanti kalon	Сержант; Serzhant	Сержанти хурд Serzhanti xurd	Ефрейтор; Efreytor	Қаторӣ; Qatorī
Tajik Air Force
Tajik Air Force	Прапоршики калон Praporshiki kalon	Прапоршик; Praporshik	Старшина; Starshyna	Сержанти калон Serzhanti kalon	Сержант; Serzhant	Сержанти хурд Serzhanti xurd	Ефрейтор; Efreytor	Қаторӣ; Qatorī
Rank group	Senior NCOs						Junior NCOs	Enlisted

== Name change ==
Guided by the principles of historicism, continuity, unification and standardization of military terminology between Persian-speaking states, the Committee on Language and Terminology, in 2018, invited the Ministry of Defense of the Republic of Tajikistan to adopt the names of formations from the Iranian Armed Forces and restore the historical names of military units.

Based on the fact that in the Persian-Tajik language military ranks traditionally come from the names of units and formations, the following military rank system for the Tajik Armed Forces was proposed:

Proposed Tajik names of military units and ranks
Units		meaning and etymology	Ranks		meaning and etymology
English names	Tajik names	meaning and etymology	British Army	Proposed Tajik	meaning and etymology
			Private	Sarbāz	lit. 'risking one's head' (from sar "head" + bāz "to lose, to let go")
			Lance corporal	Razmyār	lit. 'comrade-in-arms' < razmyār (from razm "combat" < *razma- "formation" < *raźman- "order of battle" + ayār < *hada-bāra- "assistant, deputy"
Squad	Razma	(from razma < *razma- "formation" < *raźman- "order of battle")	Corporal	Razmāvar	lit. 'leading into battle' (from razm + -āvar : -var "to lead" < *bara- "leader" < √*bar- "to lead")
			Sergeant	Razmdār	lit. 'holder of the battle formation' (from razm + dār < dār < *dār(a)- < Proto-Iranic *dārai̯a- "to hold")
			Staff Sergeant	Razmārā	lit. 'who arrays troops; experienced in warfare; adorning the battle-field, an accomplished warrior' (from razm + ārāy- "to equip (army), to arrange; put in order" < *ā-rāda- < √*rād-)
			Sergeant First Class	Razmāzmā	lit. 'skilled or accomplished in warfare; skilled in war, war-like)' (from razm + āzmāy "to measure, to test" < Middle Persian: uzmāy- < *uz-māya- < √*māy-)
			Warrant officer class 2	Razmpardāz	lit. 'who prepares the soldiers for battle' (from razm + pardāz "to prepare, to arrange" < *para-tāča- < √*tak- "to run; to attack")
			Warrant officer class 1	Razmsāz	lit. 'intent on combat; putting in battle array' (from razm + sāz < sāč- : sāxtan "to make, to prepare, to arrange" < *sāča- < √*sak- "to be ready, to be able")
Platoon	Tahma	taḥm is a Middle Persian term (from taḥmīh "force" < *taxma- < √*tak-) denoting military units originally consisting of 50 — 100 men in the Parthian and Sasanian armies	Third lieutenant	Tahmavar	lit. 'leader of a tahma; platoon commander' (from tahma + -var "to lead" < *bara- "leader" < √*bar- "to lead")
			Second lieutenant	Tahmadār	tagmadār is a Parthian term (from ancient greek tagma + dār lit. 'commander of a taḥm' in the Parthian army), which probable is a calque from the Ταγματάρχης which means "commander of a tagma"
			First lieutenant	Tahmabān	lit. 'keeper of a tahma; platoon commander' (from tahma + -bān < -pān < pāna- "keeper, guard" < *√pā- "to protect")
Company	Vašt	wašt is a Middle Persian term (from wast meaning one hundred) denoting military units originally consisting of 100 men in the Parthian and Sasanian armies	Captain	Sarwašt	lit. 'head of company' (from sar "head, chief" + vašt 'company' < wašt 'one hundred')
Battalion	Gordān	lit. 'battalion' (plural of gord "hero" < gurd < Proto-Iranic vr̥ta- < √*vr̥t- : *vart- "to protect; to resist")	Major	Sargord	lit. 'major' (from sar "head, chief" + gord "commander of a group of troops")
			Lieutenant colonel	Sarhangyār	lit. 'deputy of the colonel' (from sarhang "colonel" + -yār "assistant, deputy")
Regiment	Hang	lit. 'regiment' (from hang "strength, power" < *√θang- "to draw; to pull")	Colonel	Sarhang	lit. 'colonel' (from sarhang < sar + hang "commander of the regiment")
Brigade	Gond	gund is a Parthian term (from *vr̥nda- "army, troop")) denoting a major tactical military formation in the Parthian and Sasanian armies	Brigadier general	Gond-sālār	lit. 'general of brigade' gund-sālār is a Parthian term (from gund "army, troop" + sālār "general" < sarδār < *sara-dāra- "leader") denoting a commander of major tactical military formation in the Parthian and Sasanian armies
Division	Laškar	lit. 'division' (from laškar < *raxša-kara- "guardian" < Proto-Iranic *raxš- + *kar- "guard")	Major general	Laškar-sālār	lit. 'divisional general' (from laškar "division" + sālār "general")
Corps	Sipāh	lit. 'corps' (from spāh < spāda- < Proto-Iranic *spāda- «army»)	Lieutenant general	Sipah-sālār	lit. 'army corps general' (from spāh-sālār "commander-in chief of an army")
Army	Arteš	lit. 'army' (from artēštārīh "warriorhood" < artēštār "warrior" < raθaē-štar- "a charioteer")	General	Arteš-sālār	lit. 'army general' (from artēštārān-sālār "chief of the warriors")

The proposed system of Tajik military ranks sent to the National Security Council of Tajikistan.
