= Tajikistani Border Troops =

Tajikistani Border Troops Қӯшунҳои сарҳадӣ

Agency overview
- Formed: 26 May 1994; 32 years ago
- Preceding agency: Soviet Border Troops
- Employees: 25,000

Jurisdictional structure
- Operations jurisdiction: Tajikistan
- Specialist jurisdiction: National border patrol, security, integrity

Operational structure
- Headquarters: Dushanbe
- Agency executive: Colonel General Rajabali Rahmonali, Chief of the Border Troops
- Parent agency: State Committee for National Security

Notables
- Significant Conflict: Tajikistani Civil War 2021 Kyrgyzstan–Tajikistan conflict
- Anniversary: Border Guards Day

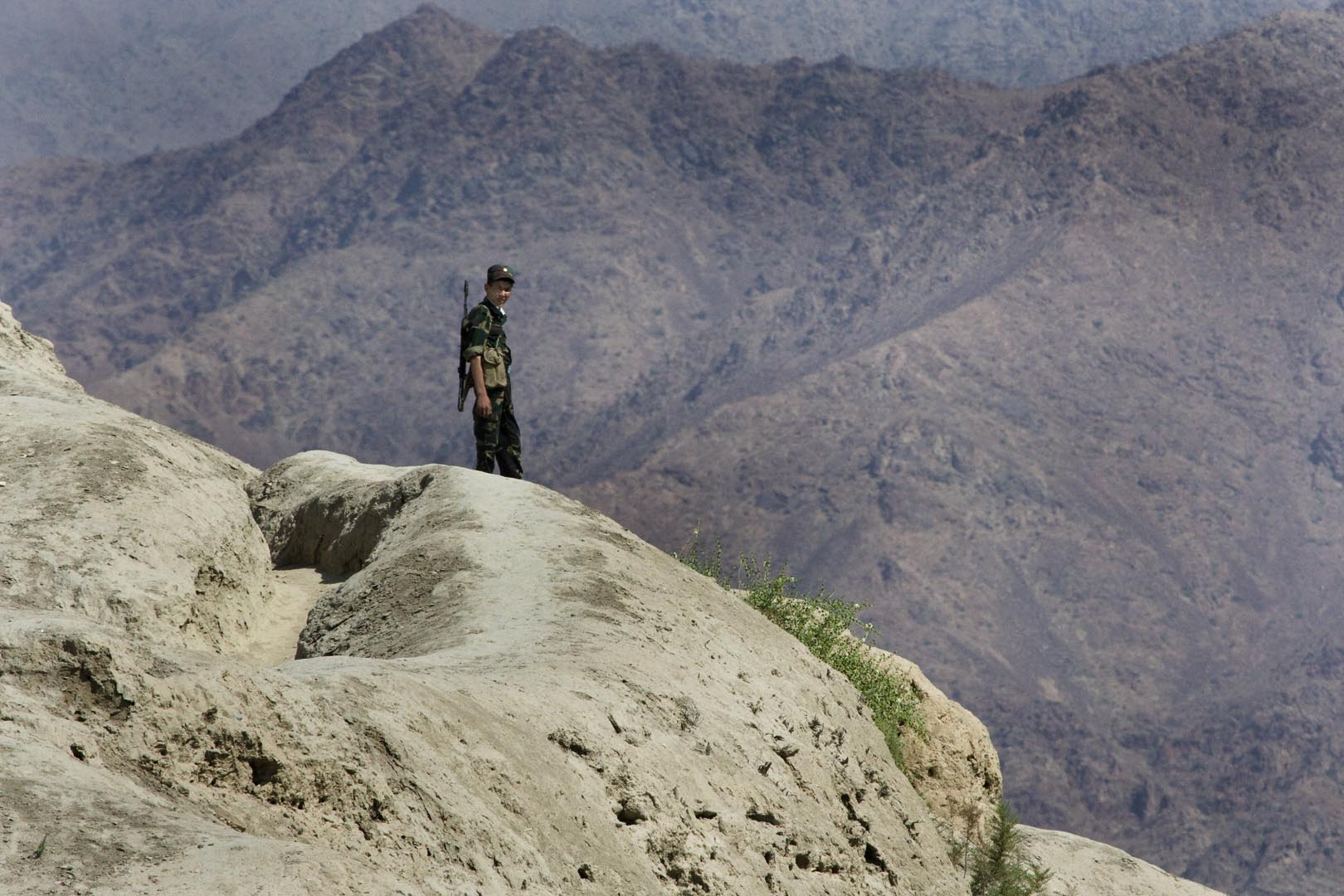
A soldier of the Border Troops stands guard in Khujand.

The Tajikistani Border Troops (Tajik: Қӯшунҳои сарҳадӣ, romanized: Qūşunhoi sarhadī), also called the Border Service, is the border guard of Tajikistan. Functioning under the State Committee for National Security as part of the Armed Forces, the border guards are trained by the Organization for Security and Co-operation in Europe, along with the Afghan Border Police. A higher education college is located in the capital, Dushanbe, the Border Troops Academy, and a Border Troops Training Centre is located south of it, in the Rudaki District. The main control station of the border troops is the Border Management Center of the Main Border Guard Directorate of the SCNS.

Outside the border troops, a detachment of the Border Service of the FSB deployed in Tajikistan mostly consists of Tajik conscripts preferring to serve under Russian command.

== History ==
At the very beginning of the Tajikistani Civil War, one of the main factors in the escalation was the state border. As a result, a Special Border Brigade, and later the Border Protection Department, were set up under the auspices of the State Security Committee, and a decision was made by the Presidium of the Supreme Soviet to establish the Border Service. This was put into force on 26 May 1994.

In 2011, the Border Troops, along with the national army and mobile forces, took part in a military drill with Kyrgyzstan. Their objective was to eliminate two terrorist groups on the Kyrgyzstani–Tajikistani border. In late 2014, four Tajikistani border guards were abducted from their posts on the border with Afghanistan by an unidentified group. Unidentified gunmen from Afghanistan killed 2 Tajikistani border guards on 26 August 2018.

== Structure ==
The border troops control the following:

- 3 regional administrations
- 17 border detachments
- 2 Spetsnaz units
- Separate air squadron
- 7 border commandant's offices
- 158 observation posts
- 34 checkpoints
- 4 training centers
- 5 military units of technical support
- Border Troops Academy

== Educational institutions ==
=== Training Center "Poytakht" ===
The Training Center "Poytakht" of the Border Troops is located in the metropolitan area of Firdavsi of Dushanbe. It is considered the main training base for servicemen of the Border Troops of SCNS, conducting the training of a large number of recruits of border guards, military personnel, including sappers, signalers, dog handlers, drivers, snipers and motorized infantry. Facilities include a sewing workshop, an assembly hall, an educational building and Radio-technical Border Management College. The silver jubilee military parade occurred on the site of the center in 2019.

=== Military Gymnasium ===
The Border Troops Military Gymnasium named after Cyrus the Great (Kurushi Kabir) was opened on 28 May 2019. The building of the Military Gymnasium consists of three two-storey buildings with an area of 1,360 square meters that includes classrooms, libraries and dormitories. Many of the students of this institution are orphans who come from remote cities and districts of the country, and it annually enrolls up to 100 people after 9th grade. Training in this gymnasium is conducted mainly in the Tajik language, and 14 non-military teachers also teach various subjects. Language classrooms specializing in English, Chinese, Turkish and Russian are also built in.

Education in the gymnasium is defined as two years, and graduates have the opportunity to further study at domestic and foreign military universities, including those in the Russian Federation, the People's Republic of China, Kazakhstan, and Azerbaijan. It has a large library for students, which allows students to use a wide range of literature. The institution is designed for 130 people. A greenhouse was built near the gymnasium in order to provide students with fresh products.

== Chairman ==
- Sherali Mirzo (2006–2013)
- Rajabali Rahmonali (since 2013)
