= Sangak Safarov =

Tajik military leader (1928–1993)

Head of the Popular Front of Tajikistan
- In office 19 June 1992 – 29 March 1993
- President: Rahmon Nabiyev
- Preceded by: post established
- Succeeded by: post abolished

Personal details
- Born: Sangak Murodovich Safarov; January 1, 1927 Danghara, Tajik ASSR, USSR
- Died: March 29, 1993 (aged 65) Bokhtarsky District, Khatlon Region, Tajikistan

Military service
- Allegiance: (Tajik Soviet Socialist Republic) Tajikistan
- Service: (Tajik Soviet Socialist Republic) Popular Front
- Service years: 1992–1993
- Conflict: Tajik Civil War

Sangak Murodovich Safarov (Tajik: Сангак Муродович Сафаров; 1 January 1928 – 29 March 1993) was a Tajik paramilitary leader and warlord who was one of the leaders of the Popular Front of Tajikistan during the Tajikistani Civil War. Also known as Bobo Sangak, although he did not hold high positions in the government, for some time he was considered by many to be almost the de facto leader of Tajikistan because of his position in the Popular Front.

== Biography ==
He was born on 1 January 1928 in the village of Dangara. Safarov was a Kulabi Tajik. His father was purged in 1935, his older brother was convicted and shot in 1939, and his two younger brothers died of hunger. In 1951, Safarov was sentenced to 1 year in prison for stealing a car, then in 1957 he was convicted of hitting a pedestrian, which led to death. After serving another term of imprisonment, Safarov worked as a barman in the central park of Dushanbe, but in 1964, he killed a Chechen racketeer, after which he was convicted and spent 23 years in prison.

== Civil War ==
In June 1992, during the Civil War in Tajikistan, his supporters staged an armed uprising in Kulob. On July 28, 1992, a ceasefire was declared, but Safarov stated that his people would not lay down their arms until the opposition government resigns. In September, Safarov, with the active support of Russian Spetsnaz colonel and military intelligence officer Vladimir Kvachkov launched an offensive in Dushanbe. In Kulob, Safarov's units put the biggest pressure on the United Tajik Opposition, and in early October, his forces seized the capital.

He is also credited with organizing the killing former Tajik President Qadriddin Aslonov in November 1992. After the 16th session of the Supreme Soviet, Safarov did not receive any official position, remaining the leader of the Popular Front. At the same time he had unlimited power, as many members of the government feared the Popular Front and its influence.

== Death ==
He was assassinated on 29 March 1993 alongside Faizali Saidov after an armed clash at the latter's house. The clash reportedly occurred during an argument over the fate of Tajik refugees in Afghanistan, and it is often believed that they killed each other. Despite this, there are also theories that they were both killed by government forces. The national government declared a state of emergency after their deaths.

31 March was declared a day of mourning. Safarov was buried in the city of Kulob in the Khatlon Region. The funeral was attended by Chairman of the Supreme Soviet Emomali Rakhmonov and Prime Minister Abdumalik Abdullajanov.

== Personal life ==
Safarov's first marriage was with an Ossetian woman, Tonya, with whom he had a son, Igor. In 1978, after his release from prison, he entered into a second marriage with a 17-year-old Tajik woman, who bore him 4 daughters and 4 sons. His third marriage with a nurse named Mehri in 1992.

== Legacy ==
Safarov has been described as a "butcher", with opposition journalist Timur Klychev claiming Safarov entered a village recently and sworn "to destroy all the men from Garm and make the women into slaves."

The Tajik Higher Military College was named after Sangak Safarov (in 2002 it was renamed the Military Institute of the Ministry of Defense).
