= Border Troops Training Centre =

Tajik military academy in Rudaki District

The Border Troops Training Centre is located in the Rudaki District of the Districts of Republican Subordination in Tajikistan, used for training personnel of the Tajik Border Troops as of 2011.
