= Border Troops Academy =

Higher Border Institute of the State Committee for National Security
- Tajikistan

Information
- Other names: Border Troops Academy; Tajik Frontier Institute
- Established: 2001; 25 years ago
- Affiliation: State Committee for National Security

The Border Troops Academy (Tajik: Академияи Қӯшунҳои сарҳадӣ) or Tajik Frontier Institute, officially known as the Higher Border Institute of the State Committee for National Security (Tajik: Донишкадаи олии сарҳадии Қӯшунҳои сарҳадии Кумитаи давлатии амнияти миллии Тоҷикистон), is a higher education college for training of officers for the Tajik Border Troops, located in Dushanbe, the capital of Tajikistan. It is a state institution.

== History ==
The Border Troops Academy was established in 2001 (25 years ago), with the first 28 border officers graduating from it in 2004.

== Academics ==
Graduates are commissioned as lieutenants in the border troops. As of 2016, it has trained more than 700 officers. Special courses are held here, overseen by the Organization for Security and Co-operation in Europe.

== Heads ==
- Abdurahmon Azimov (-August 2015)
- Shohiyoni Abdusattor (?)
- Badriddin Mirzoev (?-10 July 2020)
