= Popular Front of Tajikistan =

Tajik paramilitary organisation (1992–1997)

- Tajik: Фронти халқии Тоҷикистон; Russian: Народный фронт Таджикистана
- Leaders: Sangak Safarov and Safarali Kenjayev
- Founded: 19 June 1992
- Dates active: 1992–1997
- Dissolved: 27 June 1997
- Allegiance: Tajik Government of Emomali Rahmon
- Headquarters: Dushanbe
- Ideology: Militarism; Conservatism; Secularism; Anti-clericalism
- Political position: Centre-right
- Wars: the Civil war in Tajikistan

The Popular Front of Tajikistan (Tajik: Фронти халқии Тоҷикистон; Russian: Народный фронт Таджикистана) was a politicized paramilitary movement composed of volunteers that fought for the government during the Tajik Civil War. Up to 8,000 fighters served as part of the front.

== History ==
It emerged in June 1992, during which it began fighting against the United Tajik Opposition. The founders of the movement were Sangak Safarov and Safarali Kenjayev. It quickly gained popularity among rulers of Tajikistan, and by the fall of 1992, veterans of the Soviet Army and KGB, local militiamen, as well as law enforcement personnel joined the Popular Front. The leadership of the front subsequently became known as the “Yurchiki”, named after Yuri Andropov due to the large presence of former KGB employees. Subsequently, by the end of 1992, most of the supporters of former President Rahmon Nabiyev joined the Popular Front. In December 1992, a new government under Emomali Rahmon (the Chairman of the Supreme Council of Tajikistan) signed a resolution "On the Establishment of the Armed Forces of the Republic of Tajikistan" on the basis of the Popular Front and the forces supporting the ‘constitutional government’. On 27 June 1997, the People's Front of Tajikistan movement was disbanded. Following the 1997 peace treaty, several units of the front became part of the Tajik National Army.

== Operations ==
With the aid of the Russian 201st Motor Rifle Division and the Uzbek army, the Leninabadi-Kulobi Popular Front forces routed the opposition in early and late 1992. In Kulob, Safarov's units put the biggest pressure on the opposition. In early October, the forces of the Popular Front, acting under communist slogans, tried to seize the capital, which was then controlled by the Islamist forces.

=== Allegations of war crimes ===
According to Human Rights Watch, after the Popular Front entered Dushanbe, 'they conducted a campaign of summary executions" as well as "disappearances" of people who originate from the Pamiri and Garmi origins. Their actions resulted in the deaths of more than 300. According to eyewitnesses, Popular Front soldiers stopped buses and trolley buses, as well as deployed forces at Dushanbe International Airport to check peoples passports for people from these regions.

On 17 October 1992, musician Karomatullo Qurbonov and a number of his band members were murdered by gunmen from the Popular Front militia. Qurbonov was one of a number of intellectual and cultural figures murdered during the Tajik Civil War. In 2008 a former member of the Popular Front, Mahmadahdi Nazarov, also known as Makhsum Mahdi, was convicted of Qurbonov's murder. He is also the father of the famous female singer of Tajikistan, Noziya Karomatullo.

== Notable personnel ==
- Mahmud Khudoiberdiyev
- Faizali Saidov
- Abdulmajid Dostiev

== See also ==
- Islamic Renaissance of Tajikistan
- United Tajik Opposition
- Yerkrapah
