= Parthian army =

Army of the Parthian Empire (247 BC – 224 AD)

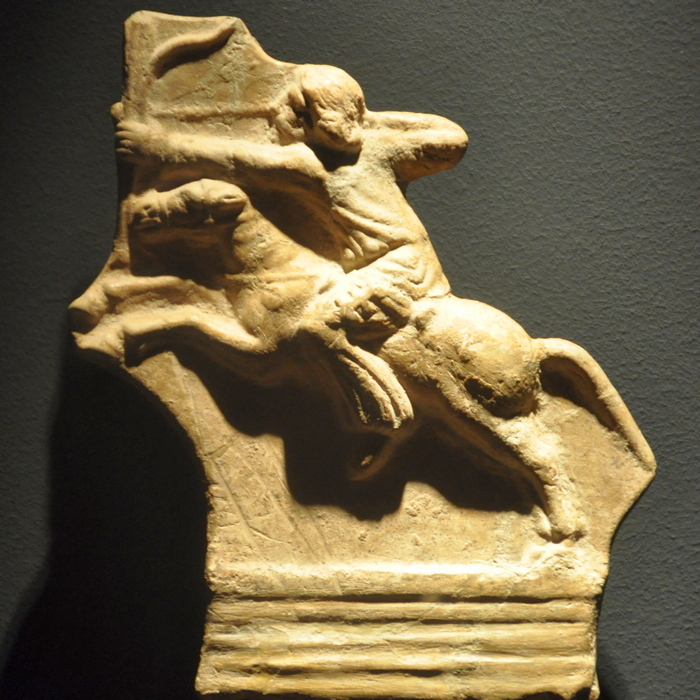
- Parthian mounted archer, located in Palazzo Madama, Turin
- Military leader: The Parthian king, his son or a spahbed from one of the great houses
- Dates active: 247 BC – 224 AD
- Allegiance: Parthian Empire
- Active regions: Iranian plateau, Mesopotamia, Asia Minor, Levant, Caucasus, Transoxiana, Arabian Peninsula
- Size: 20,000–50,000

The Parthian army was the army of the Parthian Empire (247 BC – 224 AD). The core of the army consisted of Parthians. Having no standing army, the Parthian king mainly relied on his vassal kings, regional and tribal lords, and garrison commanders. Mercenaries were also sometimes used in the army; however, this was only when the forces of the king were found lacking, or when a vassal refused to cooperate. The leader of the army was the king, his son, or a spahbed (military commander) selected from one of the great houses.

The Parthians were able to swiftly conquer a sizable portion of the Middle East because of their openness to other cultures, which encouraged the locals to cooperate with them. Parthian rulers regularly assigned their subordinates to protect Mesopotamia while they conducted military expeditions elsewhere. This occurred, for example, in 53 BC when Orodes II entrusted Surena with the region while he invaded Armenia.

== Image ==
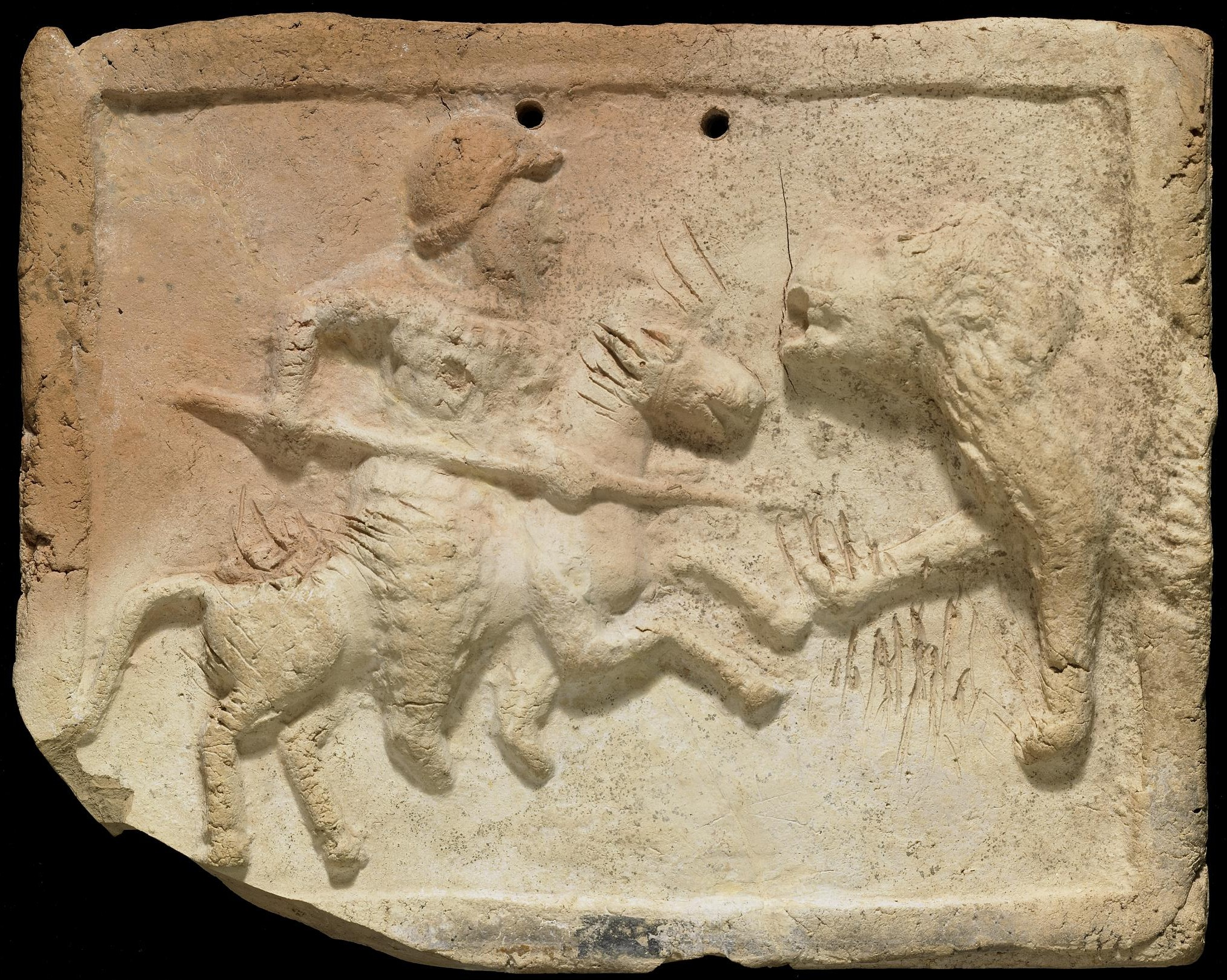
Cataphract fighting a lion, made between the 3rd BC–2nd BC century, in the Seleucid or Parthian period

Greek and Roman viewpoints dominate the historical record of the Parthian Empire. These Western writers respected Parthian military victories and imperial power, but they still viewed them as barbarians. The Parthians did not fit into the ancient idea of environmental determinism, which usually blamed a group's behavior on their climate and location. Because of this, Greeks and Romans struggled to categorize them. They considered the Parthians to be a strange mixture of Persian and Scythian traits. In these descriptions, the Parthians were brave but deceptive warriors, as well as talented but cruel leaders. Western writers respected Parthian achievements while looking down on them as culturally inferior. They created a contradictory image of a military force that was powerful in battle but cowardly and unreliable by nature. According to the modern historian Nikolaus Leo Overtoom; "Unfortunately, these western perspectives permeate our understanding of the political, cultural, and military history of the Parthians to this day."

The Roman–Jewish historian Josephus highlighted the martial prowess of the Parthians in his writings. He stated that Parthian men always carried swords and held brave adversaries in high regard. Because horses were central to their society, Josephus noted that stripping a nobleman naked and forcing him to ride a donkey was the worst possible humiliation. These observations often relied on Mesopotamian Jewish sources who knew Parthian culture well. Ultimately, the Jews viewed the Parthians as skilled warriors. Josephus even included a speech by Herodian ruler Herod Agrippa II that described the Parthians as "that most warlike body of men, and lords of so many nations, and encompassed with such mighty forces".

Parthians trained in riding and archery from childhood. Their reputation has survived in the Persian word pahlevan (derived from Pahlav, itself from Parθava). Additionally, military history texts frequently cite Parthian battle strategies and archery methods.

== Composition ==
The army was mainly composed of Parthian nobles (azadan) and their subjects whom they brought along. The army did thus not endure for long, due to the nobles having to go back to their estates and crops. The Parthian general wanted to finish the expedition as fast as possible and return home. The king himself did not wish the campaign to fare for long, due to stress of a possible rebellion occurring in his realm, which frequently happened and was the biggest defect of the empire.

The Parthian forces mainly consisted of two types of cavalry; the cataphracts, heavy cavalry with man and horse decked in mailed armor, who formed the smaller part of the cavalry. The second and main component of the cavalry were the mounted archers, light cavalry whose mobility and long-range warfare abilities made them a menacing enemy. They used composite bows and were able to shoot at enemies while riding and facing away from them; this technique, known as the Parthian shot, was a highly effective tactic. According to Strabo, Parthian warhorses were distinct from those of the Greek world, but similar to the Nisean horses of the kings of the Achaemenid Empire.

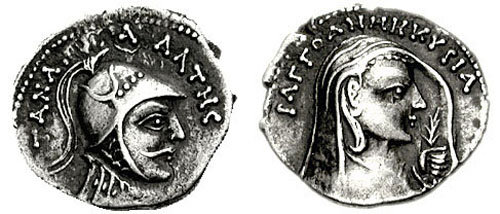
Coin of Tanlis Mardates (TANAIEMAIAATHE), governor of the Arsacid provinces of Sakastan and Arachosia (80-40 BC), with Rangodeme (PAITOAHMH KYPIA). He wears the armour and headgear of Parthian cataphracts: his coins show a low, oval helmet, with a neckguard and a plume.

Parthians made less use of infantry, due to their less convenient role on the wide expanses of Mesopotamia, Iran and Central Asia. They were thus small in numbers and mainly used to guard forts. The Parthians also made use of camel riders equipped with long lances, most likely recruited from the western frontier or nomadic allies. The camel was better suited than the horse to bear the weight of the rider and tolerate harsh circumstances. Furthermore, with the camel, the rider could unload his arrows from an elevated spot. However, Roman caltrops considerably hindered the animal. The Parthians did not employ war chariots, and limited the use of chariots to carry women accompanying the commanders.

There are a few records of Parthians using war elephants. The Roman historian Cassius Dio reported that Vologases I (r. 51–78) entered combat on an elephant, though this was likely a rare occurrence.

== Organization ==
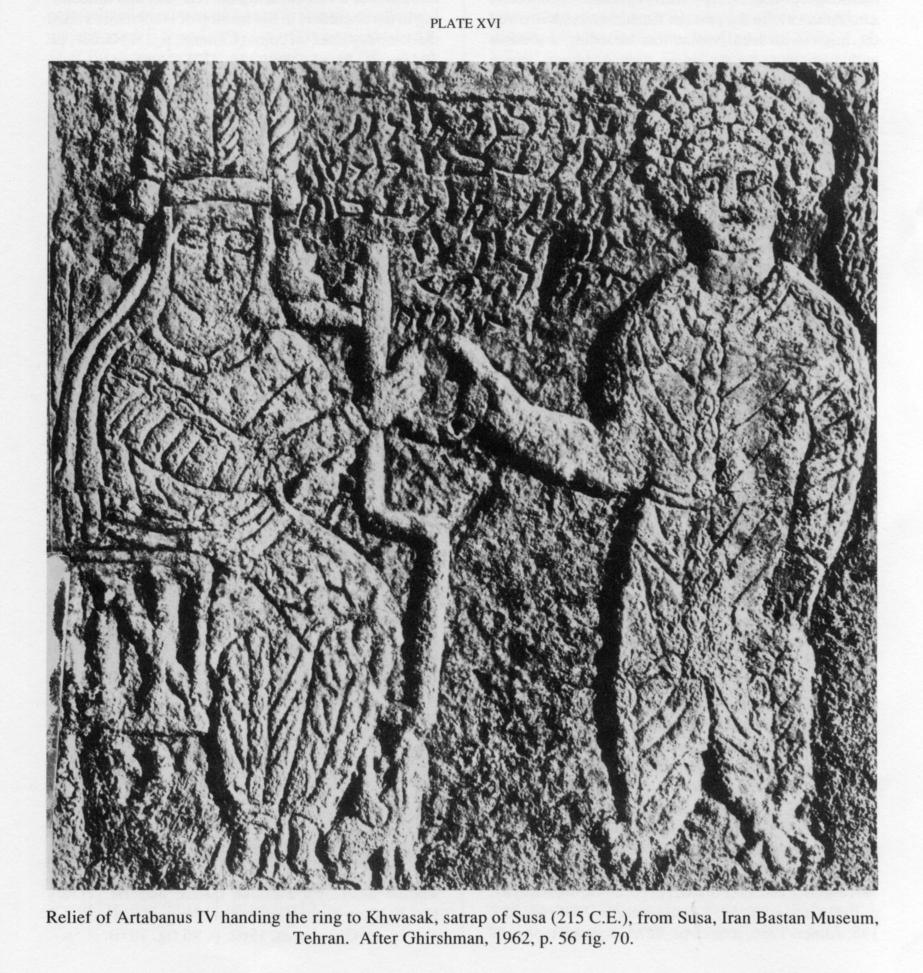
Relief of Artabanus IV and Khwasak, satrap of Susa, dated 215 AD

The military structure of the Parthian Empire possibly mirrored that of the Achaemenid Empire, where the king and provincial governors maintained security within their specific regions. Roman forces in Mesopotamia typically encountered local leaders rather than the Parthian king. This perspective provides an alternative interpretation of the account of the Roman civil servant Herodian, who wrote that Vologases V "had little idea that Severus' war against Hatra was any concern of his. So he was inactive". Vologases V possibly viewed the Roman border violation as a regional conflict for his subordinate king to manage. The Parthian king intervened only when Roman incursions escalated into full-scale threats to the entire empire, as demonstrated during major Roman invasions and the revolt by Ardashir I in the 220s AD.

== Numbers, divisions and banners ==
The core of the army consisted of Parthians. For the majority of Parthian history, probably between 20,000 and 50,000 were deployed in battle. The largest number of soldiers that the Parthians are recorded to have mustered were 50,000 against the Roman politician Mark Antony. Each division of the Parthian army had its standard, which either displayed an image of a dragon, eagle, or the sun. The imperial banner seems to have been the Derafsh Kaviani, the national emblem of Iran.

The successor of the Parthians, the Sasanians, incorporated the Parthian forces into their army.

== Sources ==
- Brosius, Maria (2006), The Persians: An Introduction, Routledge, ISBN 978-0415320900
- Dąbrowa, Edward (2012). "The Arsacids and their State". In Rollinger, Robert (ed.). Altertum und Gegenwart : 125 Jahre alte Geschichte in Innsbruck : Vorträge der Ringvorlesung Innsbruck 2010. pp. 21–52.
- Ellerbrock, Uwe (2021). The Parthians: The Forgotten Empire. Routledge. ISBN 978-0367481902.
- Garthwaite, Gene Ralph (2005), The Persians, Oxford & Carlton: Blackwell Publishing, Ltd., ISBN 978-1-55786-860-2
- Hauser, Stefan (2006). "Was there no paid standing army? A fresh look on military and political institutions in the Arsacid Empire". In Mode, Markus; Tubach, Jürgen (eds.). Arms and Armour as Indicators of Cultural Transfer: The Steppes and the Ancient World from Hellenistic Times to the Early Middle Ages. Reichert. pp. 295–319. ISBN 978-8779344433.
- Kurz, Otto (1983). "Cultural Relations Between Parthia and Rome". In Yarshater, Ehsan (ed.). The Cambridge History of Iran: The Seleucid, Parthian and Sasanian Periods. Vol. 3(1). Cambridge: Cambridge University Press. pp. 559–567. ISBN 0-521-20092-X..
- McDonough, Scott (2013). "Military and Society in Sasanian Iran". In Campbell, Brian; Tritle, Lawrence A. (eds.). The Oxford Handbook of Warfare in the Classical World. Oxford University Press. pp. 1–783. ISBN 9780195304657.
- Overtoom, Nikolaus (2024). "Patricide, Fratricide, and Betrayal: the Role of Parthia in the First War with Rome". In Hyland, John; Rezakhani, Khodadad (eds.). Brill's Companion to War in the Ancient Iranian Empires. Brill Publishers. pp. 329–365. ISBN 978-9004708211.
- Overtoom, Nikolaus (2025). "Concepts of Courage and Cowardice in the Formation of the Parthian State". In Finn, Jenn (ed.). Brill's Companion to Courage and Cowardice in Ancient Warfare. Brill Publishers. pp. 385–419. ISBN 978-9004708211.
- Shahbazi, A. Shapur (1986). "Army i. Pre-Islamic Iran". Encyclopaedia Iranica, Vol. II, Fasc. 5. pp. 489–499.
- Shahbazi, A. Shapur (1994). "Derafš". In Yarshater, Ehsan (ed.). Encyclopædia Iranica. Vol. VII/3: Dehqān I–Deylam, John of. London and New York: Routledge & Kegan Paul. pp. 312–315. ISBN 978-1-56859-021-9.
