= Faizali Saidov =

Tajikistani military leader

Faizali Saidov (Tajik: Файзали Саидов) was a military leader from Tajikistan who led forces of the Popular Front of Tajikistan during the Tajikistani Civil War.

== Biography ==
His father was a Lakai-Uzbek while his mother was a Kulabi. He was born in 1964 and came from a sovkhoz near Kurgan-Tyube. In September 1992, officers of the 191st Motorized Rifle Regiment of the Russian 201st Motor Rifle Division seized tanks to be transferred to the Saidov in order to prevent the seizure of the city of Kurgan-Tyube by Islamist detachments. During the war, he led the 11th Independent Special Forces Brigade of the Ministry of Defense, based out of the city of Kalininabad. Saidov's 65-year-old father was mutilated and burnt to death by opposition forces, in violation of a deal to exchange him for POWs freed by Saidov, as a result of which he began a crackdown against the opposition. After the front took control of Dushanbe, Saidov, laid siege to the headquarters to the Ministry of Internal Affairs (VKD) with a demand that he be given “some job.”

== Death ==
He was assassinated on 29 March 1993, alongside Sangak Safarov after an armed clash at his house. There are multiple versions of their deaths, including one where they kill each other as well as another where government troops were responsible for his death. The clash reportedly occurred during an argument over the fate of refugees living in Taliban Afghanistan. The government declared a state of emergency after their deaths. Saidov was succeeded as brigade commander by Izat Kuganov.

== Legacy ==
On 24 June 1993, by order of the Council of Ministers led by Abdumalik Abdullajanov, the name Faizali Saidov was attached to the 11th Brigade. It therefore became the 11th Independent Special Forces Brigade "Faizali Saidov". A memorial billboard commemorating Saidov is located in Khatlon Region. There is a state farm named after Faizali Saidov in the Kushoniyon District.
