= Nikolai Moskvitelev =

Soviet military officer

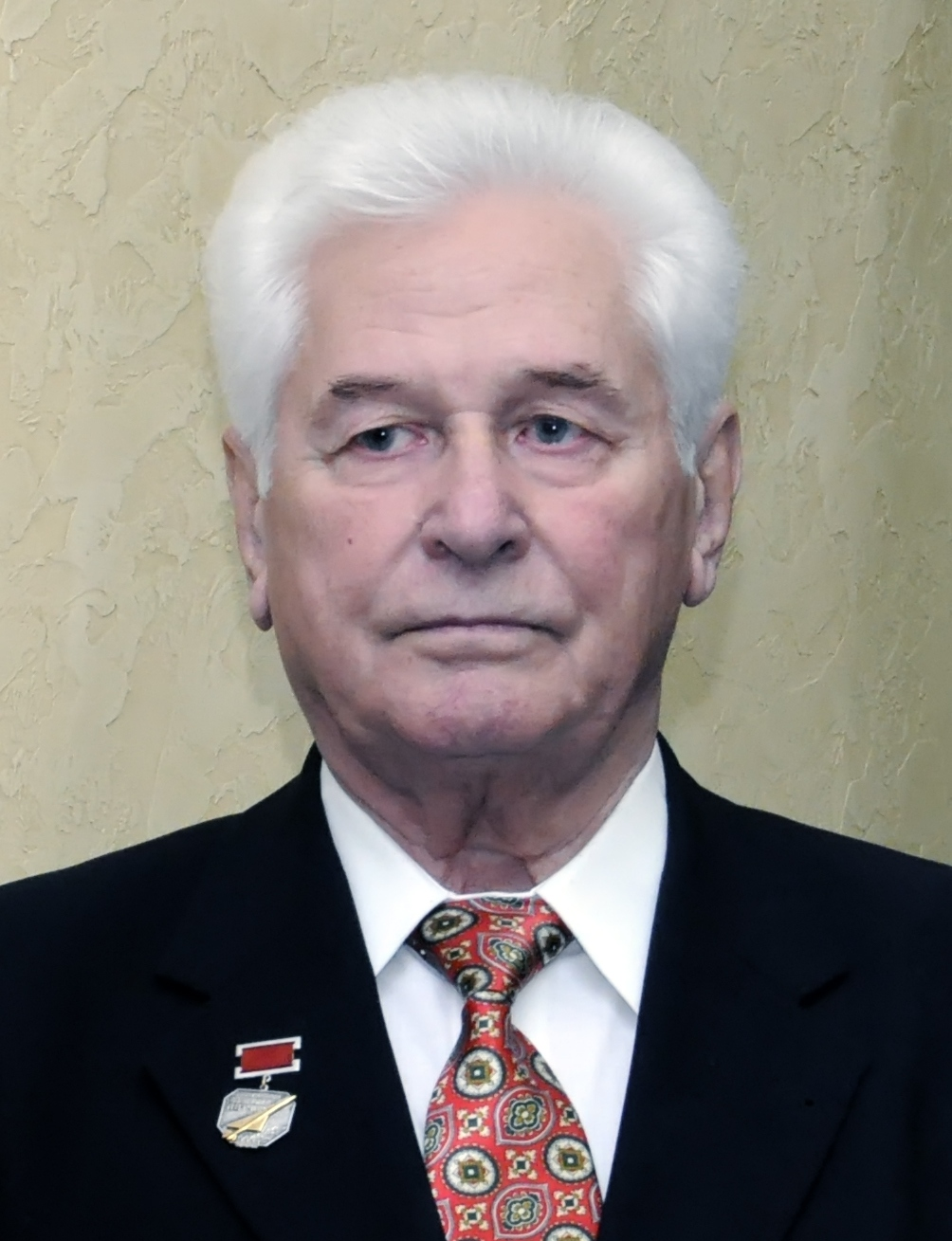
- Moskvitelev in 2011
- Native name: Николай Иванович Москвителев
- Born: 27 July 1926; Vyazovy Gai, Nikolayevsky Uyezd, Samara Governorate, Russian SFSR, USSR
- Died: 12 February 2020 (aged 93) Moscow, Russia
- Buried: Federal Military Memorial Cemetery
- Allegiance: Soviet Union; Russia
- Branch: Soviet Naval Aviation; Soviet Air Defence Forces
- Service years: 1943–1990
- Rank: Colonel General
- Awards: Order of Honour; Order of Friendship; Order of the October Revolution; Order of the Red Banner; Order of the Red Banner of Labour; Three Orders of the Red Star; Order "For Service to the Homeland in the Armed Forces of the USSR" Third Class; Medal of Zhukov; Medal "For the Victory over Germany in the Great Patriotic War 1941–1945"; Honoured Military Pilot of the USSR

Nikolai Ivanovich Moskvitelev (Russian: Николай Иванович Москвителев; 27 July 1926 – 12 February 2020) was an officer of the Soviet Armed Forces, having served in Soviet Naval Aviation and the Soviet Air Defence Forces, rising to the rank of Colonel General and the position of commander of the Air Defence Forces' aviation component.

Born into a working-class family which suffered hardships during the 1930s, Moskvitelev volunteered for service at the front during the Second World War, but was instead posted to pilot training. The war ended before he could see combat, but he remained in the armed forces, being assigned to Soviet Naval Aviation with the Baltic Fleet. He trained on new types of aircraft, including the jet fighter aircraft which began to enter service in the 1950s, such as the Mikoyan-Gurevich MiG-15. After two and half years with the fleet, Moskvitelev was assigned to a role retraining naval aviators on new models of jet fighters, and in 1958 took up an active service role with the Black Sea Fleet's naval aviation. This post was short-lived. By 1960 naval aviation units were being phased into the Air Defence Armies, and Moskvitelev's regiment was assessed by three times Hero of the Soviet Union Alexander Pokryshkin prior to being transferred. This was the start of an enduring relationship between the two, with Pokryshkin acting as Moskvitelev's patron and commander in a number of positions.

By now part of the Soviet Air Defence Forces, Moskvitelev studied in absentia at the Air Defence Military Command Academy, and in 1967 became deputy chief of aviation of the 8th Air Defence Army. He took part in the military intervention in Czechoslovakia during the Prague Spring in 1968, and later became deputy commander and then commander of the aviation component of the Moscow Air Defence District. In April 1977 he became commander of the aviation component of the entire Soviet Air Defence Forces, and over the next decade oversaw the integration of new technologies and types of aircraft into the Air Defence Forces. In 1987 he was appointed representative to the Headquarters of the Allied Forces of the Warsaw Pact countries, until his retirement in 1990.

In retirement Moskvitelev worked as assistant to the general designer of the Mikoyan Design Bureau, and as chief adviser at the Gromov Flight Research Institute. He remained active in air force matters, and in 2007 formed the Honoured Military Pilots, Test Pilots and Navigators Club. Over his career he had received a number of awards and honours, wrote his memoirs, and continued to fly in old age. He died in 2020 at the age of 93.

== Family and early life ==
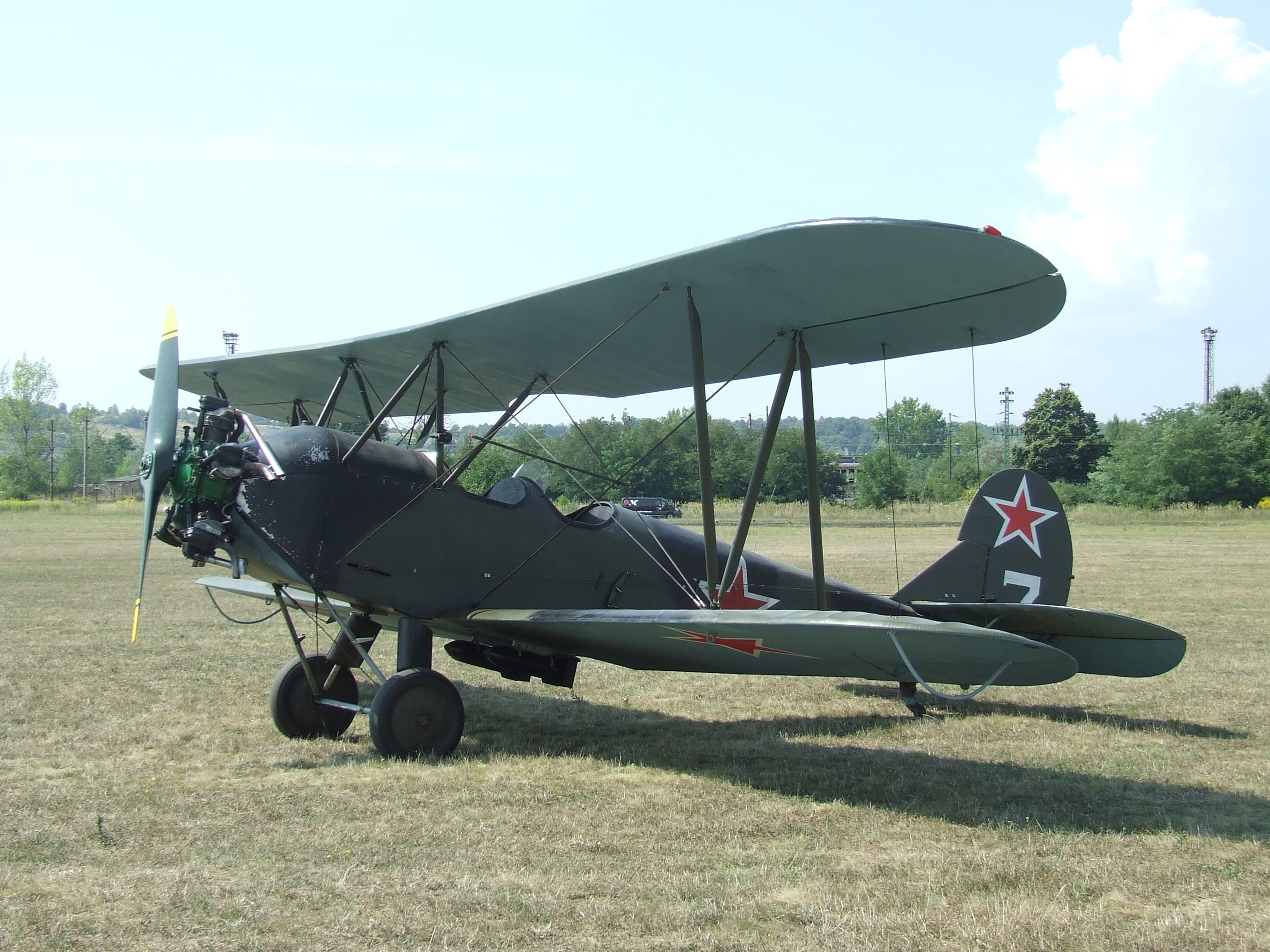
The Polikarpov U-2, a training aircraft Moskvitelev learnt to fly on

Moskvitelev was born into a working-class family on 27 July 1926 in Vyazovy Gai, then part of Nikolayevsky Uyezd, Samara Governorate, in the Russian SFSR, USSR. His family was affected by the famines in the early 1930s which caused considerable hardship in the Volga region in which they lived. Moskvitelev's mother died in 1938, while his father took employment as a mechanic at a machine tractor station, but still struggled to make a living wage. After the Axis invasion of the Soviet Union, embroiling the USSR in the Second World War, and reaching the age for service in 1943, Moskvitelev appeared before the authorities and requested a posting to the front. He was instead offered to be trained as a pilot at the 1st School of Naval Pilots in Kuybyshev, which he accepted. He was initially trained on the U-2 and UT-2 aircraft, and in late 1944 was transferred to the I. V. Stalin Yeysk Naval Aviation School. The war ended before he could fly in combat, and his graduation was deferred while the cadets were tasked with helping rebuild the damaged city of Yeysk. Flying lessons resumed in 1946, and Moskvitelev finally graduated in 1947.

Moskvitelev's first assignment was to the fighter aviation regiment of the 4th Baltic Fleet Air Force, based at Mamonovo, near Kaliningrad. The Lavochkin La-5, the type of aircraft he had experience in flying, was not one of those assigned to his new regiment, requiring him to retrain to be able to fly the Bell P-39 Airacobra and Bell P-63 Kingcobra. After two and half years with the fleet's naval aviation, he was recalled to the training school at Yeysk, where experienced personnel were in demand to train new pilots. Over this period he rose from pilot to flight commander. Moskvitelev trained cadets on the Lavochkin La-7 and Lavochkin La-9, and underwent retraining himself in 1952 to be able to fly the new jet fighter aircraft then entering service, such as the Mikoyan-Gurevich MiG-15.

== Pilot instructor and commander ==
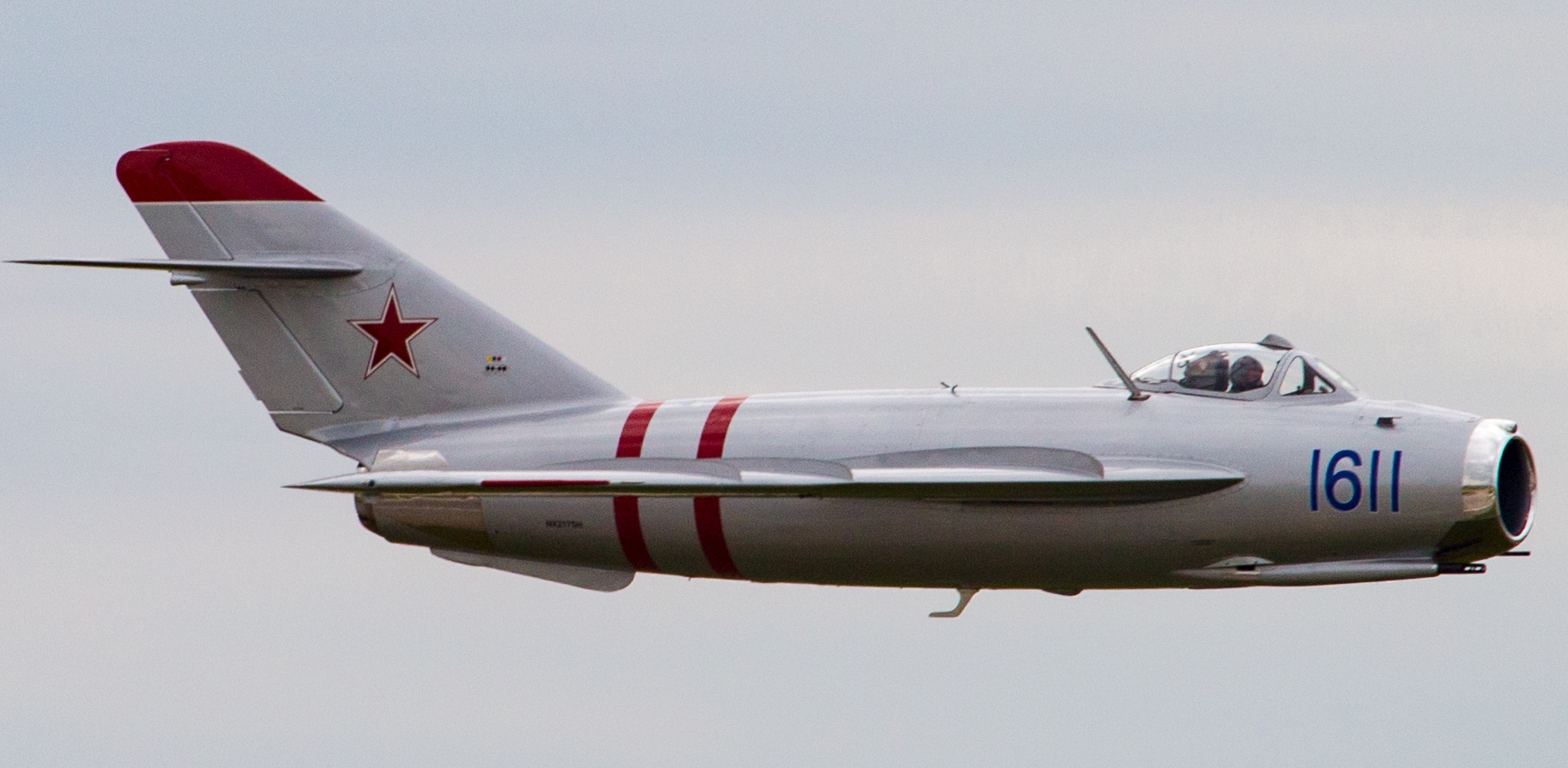
The Mikoyan-Gurevich MiG-17, a new type of jet fighter Moskvitelev first learnt to fly, before teaching naval aviators to operate them

In 1953 Moskvitelev left Yeysk for an assignment in Riga as part of the Special Naval Aviation Training Regiment under Lieutenant Colonel I. M. Lukin. Moskvitelev was one of eleven instructors who were required to learn how to fly new models of jet fighters, including the Yakovlev Yak-25, Mikoyan-Gurevich MiG-17 and Mikoyan-Gurevich MiG-19, and then retrain naval aviators to be able to fly them. During this time he was promoted from the position of flight commander to air squadron commander, and then to regiment navigator. As well as carrying out training missions, he performed reconnaissance missions on NATO installations on Gotland, and interceptions of English Electric Canberra reconnaissance aircraft in the MiG-19. By 1957 the regiment's task was judged to have been successfully completed, and it was disbanded. Moskvitelev, then holding the rank of major, was transferred to Sevastopol as deputy commander of an air regiment, followed six months later with the post of senior inspector-pilot of the Black Sea Fleet Air Force. This was followed in April 1958 with the position of commander of the 62nd Fighter Aviation Regiment in the fleet's air force, and the award of the Order of the Red Banner that year.

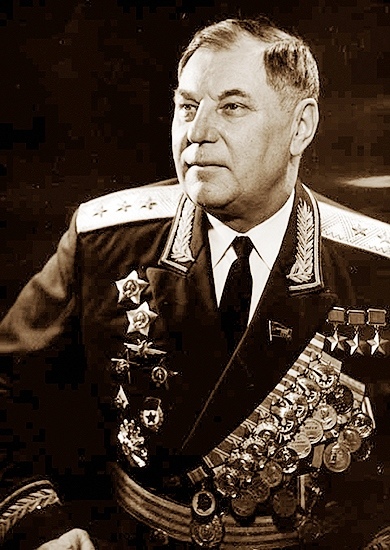
Three times Hero of the Soviet Union Alexander Pokryshkin, who took a special interest in Moskvitelev's career.

In 1960 the fleet's naval aviation began to be phased out as part of a restructuring, with personnel and equipment transferred to the Air Defence armies. A commission led by General Georgy Gromov arrived at Belbek Air Base in April 1960, tasked with transferring Moskvitelev's fighter regiment from the Black Sea Fleet Air Force to the 8th Air Defence Army. With the commission was three times Hero of the Soviet Union Alexander Pokryshkin, who enquired of Moskvitelev how he felt about the transfer. Moskvitelev replied that he was feeling positive, but when Pokryshkin asked if it wasn't a pity to give up his naval aviator uniform, Moskvitelev admitted that it was. Pokryshkin replied "Well done! Do not bother!" Moskvitelev's regiment was accepted into service with the Separate Air Defence Army, and in 1962 it was declared the best in the Soviet Air Defence Forces. Pokryshkin came to rely on Moskvitelev for important tasks, such as on 1 May when an enemy high-altitude reconnaissance aircraft was detected. Pokryshkin ordered Moskvitelev to prepare to destroy the intruder if it came within range. Moskvitelev was appointed deputy commander of the aviation division in 1963, and at Pokryshkin's request, submitted an application to study at the Air Defence Military Command Academy. Pokryshkin suggested he study in absentia, while continuing his role flying and instructing new pilots. In 1967 Moskvitelev became deputy chief of aviation of the 8th Air Defence Army in Kyiv, under Pokryshkin's command.

== Military operations and staff command ==
In 1968, with Soviet concerns increasing over the liberalising agenda of reformist First Secretary of the Communist Party of Czechoslovakia Alexander Dubček, known as the Prague Spring, Soviet and Warsaw Pact forces prepared to carry out a military intervention. Moskvitelev was given command of three regular aviation regiments and flew with them to Czechoslovakia to carry out combat missions in support of the interventionist forces. After this, in late 1968, he was appointed deputy commander of the 4th Independent Air Defence Army and chief of army aviation at Sverdlovsk. In 1970 Moskvitelev completed his studies in absentia and graduated from the Air Defence Military Command Academy. By now a colonel, he was appointed deputy commander of the aviation component of the Moscow Air Defence District. After four years in this post he was advanced to commander of the district's aviation component, and became a member of its Military Council. In April 1977 Moskvitelev served as commander of the aviation component of the entire Soviet Air Defence Forces, succeeding twice Hero of the Soviet Union General-Colonel of Aviation Andrey Borovykh. He held this position for the next decade, also serving as deputy chairman and chairman of the State Commissions for the reception of new aviation equipment, during which time he oversaw the testing and introduction of the latest developments in Soviet aerospace designs, including the MiG-23, MiG-25, MiG-31, Su-27 and A-50. From March 1987 he served as the representative to the Headquarters of the Allied Forces of the Warsaw Pact countries, under Wolfgang Reinhold of the GDR's Kommando LSK/LV, until his retirement in 1990.

== In retirement ==
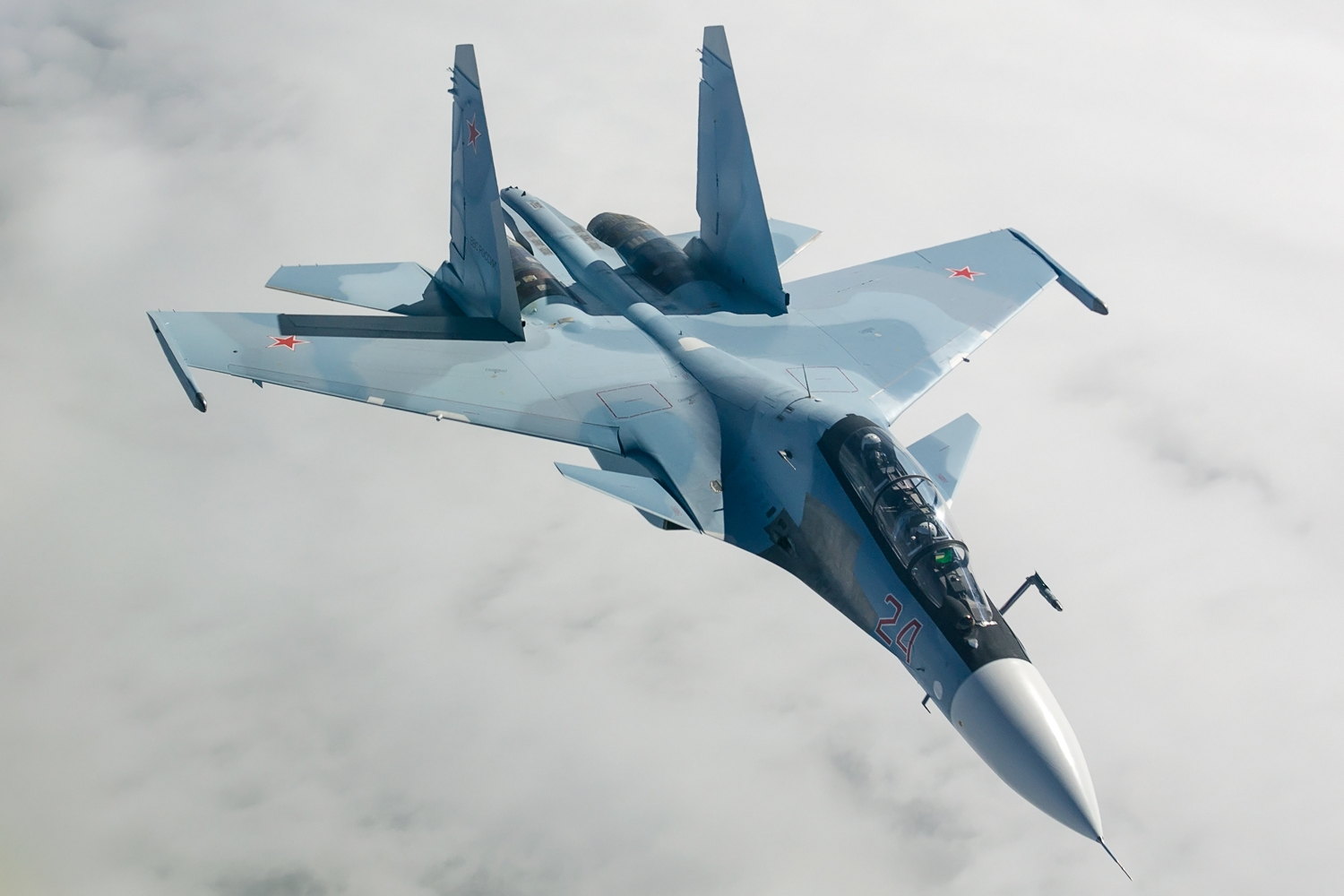
A Sukhoi Su-30 fighter jet. Moskvitelev flew this type of aircraft at the age of 80, putting it through various aerobatic manoeuvres.

After leaving the armed forces with the rank of General-Colonel of Aviation, Moskvitelev worked for a time as assistant to the general designer of the Mikoyan Design Bureau, and from 1993 was chief adviser at the Gromov Flight Research Institute. In 1998 Moskvitelev became a member of the "Russian Military Brotherhood", and in 2007 he formed the Honoured Military Pilots, Test Pilots and Navigators Club, a veterans' association. He continued to take part in aviation affairs, often visiting units and playing a role in education and training efforts. Over his career he had received the Order of Honour, Order of Friendship, Order of the October Revolution, Order of the Red Banner, Order of the Red Banner of Labour, and three Orders of the Red Star, as well as being made an Honoured Military Pilot of the USSR in 1968. He held 24 medals, including the Medal "For the Victory over Germany in the Great Patriotic War 1941–1945", as well as orders and honours from Bulgaria and East Germany.

Moskvitelev was able to fly 34 types of aircraft, and had 4,000 flight hours on fighter aircraft. He continued to fly in old age, carrying out aerobatic manoeuvres. On his 80th birthday he flew a Sukhoi Su-30 fighter, carrying out aerobatic manoeuvres reaching 6 g_{0}, and on the eve of his 90th birthday flew a Yakovlev Yak-52 from Minsk Aero Club, again putting it through a series of manoeuvres reaching 6 g_{0}. He maintained an interest in technical developments, becoming a candidate of Sciences in 1984, and had also co-authored the university textbook ""Applied Methods of Comparative Assessment and Combat Potential of Aviation Military Equipment". He wrote his memoirs, published as Life Line (Russian: Линия Жизни).

Moskvitelev died on 12 February 2020, at the age of 93, after a "serious and prolonged illness". He was buried in the Federal Military Memorial Cemetery on 15 February. He was married, with two daughters.
