= Commander of the Tajik Ground Forces =

Commander of the Ground Forces
- Фармондеҳи Қӯшунҳои хушкигарди Тоҷикистон (Tajik)
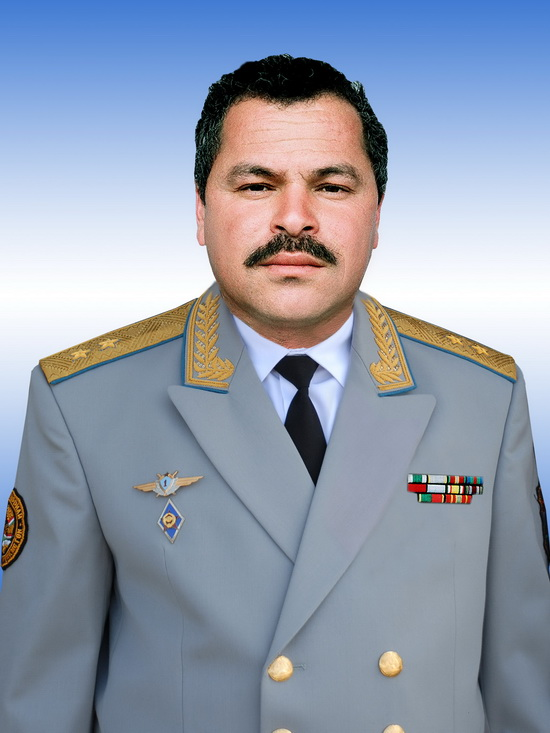
- Incumbent; Lieutenant General Rahmonali Safaralizoda since 28 February 2024
- Ministry of Defence
- Reports to: Chief of the General Staff
- Seat: Dushanbe
- Constituting instrument: Constitution of Tajikistan

The Commander of the Tajik Ground Forces (Tajik: Фармондеҳи Қӯшунҳои хушкигарди Тоҷикистон, romanized: Farmondehi Qūşunhoi xuşkigardi Toçikiston) is the administrative head in the Tajik Ground Forces, and is under the Chief of the General Staff and the Ministry of Defence. The current Commander of the Ground Forces is Lieutenant General Rahmonali Safaralizoda.

== List of commanders ==
No.	Portrait	Name (born–died)	Term of office			Ref.
No.	Portrait	Name (born–died)	Took office	Left office	Time in office	Ref.
		Abdulnazar Abdulasanov	1997	2005		
		Emomali Sobirzoda	2010	2015		
		Colonel Nazar Safarov	circa 2015	?		
		Bobojon Saidzoda	24 November 2015	9 February 2018	2 years, 77 days	
		Bakhtiyor Mumin Muminzoda	4 November 2018	?		
		Khusrav Bobozoda	?	28 February 2024		
		Lieutenant General; Rahmonali Safaralizoda (born 1969)	28 February 2024	Incumbent	2 years, 214 days	
