= Rabiga Kushaeva =

Bashkir female activist (1901–1937)

Rabiga Jangulowna Kushaeva (Russian: Рабига Янгуловна Кушаева; 1901–1937) was a Soviet women's rights activist of Bashkir origin.

== Biography ==
Kushaeva Rabiga Jangulowna was born in 1901 in the village of Khassyanovo in the Samara Governorate, now the Bolshechernigovsky District of the Samara Oblast.

Rabiga Jangulowna became a village school teacher in Burzyan in the Samara Governorate in 1916. Her older brother, Kharis Jumagulovich Jumagulov (1891–1937), was one of the leaders of the Bashkir independence movement.

In 1917, Rabiga Jangulowna participated in the work of the Bashkir Kurultai in Orenburg as a delegate of the Bashkirs of the Pugachyov Uyezd. At this assembly, she advocated for the equality of Bashkir women. She demanded full civil and political rights for women, equal to those of men, and proposed specific measures to realize these demands. Her ten points for gender equality were included in the Kurultai's resolution.

In 1919, Rabiga Jangulowna became the head of the Women's Affairs Department of the Bashkir Regional Committee of the CPSU. Together with others, she organized the All-Bashkir Conference of Women Workers and Peasants, which took place in Sterlitamak in September 1920. In November 1921, she participated in the IX session of the All-Russian Congress of Soviets in Moscow. She was involved in organizing and preparing the I All-Bashkir Congress of Women Workers and Peasants, which took place in November 1924, and the All-Bashkir Women's Congress in the Soviet, held in October 1927.

Rabiga Jangulowna married Khafis Kuschayevich Kuschayev (1888–1937) in 1922, who had been a soldier in the Imperial Russian Army and participated in the Bashkir independence movement after the October Revolution.

In 1927, Kuschajewa became the director of the Khudaiberdin Children's Home in Ufa. In 1929, she became an inspector of the Department of Children's Homes of the People's Commissariat for Education of the RSFSR in Moscow.

In the summer of 1937, Kuschajewa died in an accident while returning home by electric train. In the same year, during the Great Purge, her husband was executed as a Bashkir nationalist on September 27 (rehabilitated in 1957) and her brother was shot in December (rehabilitated in 1959).

Kuschajewa had three children. Her first daughter, Minsylu, died of diphtheria in 1923. Her second daughter, Tansylu (Dina) (1925–1996), became a ballerina in Perm. After the death of their parents, their five-year-old son, Irek, was sent to an orphanage.
