= Vasily Kryuchyonkin =

Soviet Lieutenant general

- Native name: Василий Крючёнкин
- Born: 13 January 1894; Karpovka, Buguruslansky Uyezd,
- Died: 10 June 1976 (aged 82) Kiev, Ukrainian SSR
- Buried: Baikove Cemetery
- Allegiance: Soviet Union
- Branch: Red Army
- Service years: 1915-1917; 1918-1946
- Rank: Lieutenant general
- Commands: 3rd Guards Cavalry Corps; 28th Army; 69th Army; 10th Army; 33rd Army

Vasily Dmitriyevich Kryuchyonkin (Russian: Василий Дмитриевич Крючёнкин; 13 January 1894 – 10 June 1976) was a Soviet Lieutenant general during World War II who commanded several armies.

== Biography ==
=== Early life, World War I and Russian Civil War ===
Vasily Dmitriyevich Kryuchyonkin was born on 13 January 1894 in the village of Karpovka, Buguruslansky Uyezd, Samara Governorate, in a peasants' family, and had seven siblings. Due to his family's extreme poverty, he was adopted by a wealthy villager, a relative of his father, at the age of two. However, his adoptive father saw him as free labour and from the age of seven Kryuchyonkin worked on the farm and then as a loader in the small store owned by his adoptive father. Kryuchyonkin only graduated from the three-year village primary school.

Conscripted into the Imperial Russian Army during World War I, Kryuchyonkin was sent to the Western Front in September 1915, rising to junior unter-ofitser with the Alexandria 5th Hussar Regiment of the 5th Cavalry Division. After the October Revolution, he joined the 4th Moscow Red Guard Detachment, formed in Cherepovets. As a platoon commander and chairman of the detachment revolutionary committee he fought in the suppression of the Kerensky–Krasnov uprising at Gatchina. In February 1918 the detachment was sent to the Eastern Front, where it was reorganized into the 1st Orenburg Cavalry Regiment of the Red Army. With the regiment, Kryuchyonkin serviced as assistant commander of its 2nd squadron and simultaneously as chairman of the regimental revolutionary committee. He took part in the battles against the Orenburg Cossacks of Alexander Dutov.

The regiment was assigned to the Zhlobin detachment on 10 May and transferred to the Turkestan Front. During the summer and fall, Kryuchyonkin fought against White and British troops in the regions of Chardzhou, Ashkhabad, and Krasnovodsk. His regiment was then transferred to the region of Akhtubinsk and Orenburg, where it fought against the forces of Alexander Kolchak and Dutov. In September the regiment was redesignated as the 13th Cavalry, which as part of the 3rd Turkestan Brigade fought on the Southern Front against the Armed Forces of South Russia, with Kryuchyonkin commanding a squadron. The regiment was then renamed the 64th Cavalry Regiment, after which it was assigned to the 11th Cavalry Division of the 1st Cavalry Army. In May 1920 the army was relocated to the Southwestern Front and Kryuchyonkin fought in the Kiev operation, Novgorod-Volynsky, Rovno, and Lwów operations during the Polish–Soviet War. After the Soviet defeat in the war the division was relocated to the Southern Front and took part in the Northern Taurida and Perekop–Chongar operations.

=== Interwar period ===
After the end of the war, Kryuchyonkin continued to serve with the 11th Cavalry Division. In October 1921, he was appointed acting commander of the 63rd Cavalry Regiment, leading it in the suppression of the Revolutionary Insurrectionary Army of Ukraine, the forces of Talak and Savinkov and other opponents of the Soviets in Belorussia. In late November he was sent to study at the Kiev Combined Military School. After graduating in September 1923, Kryuchyonkin returned to the 11th Cavalry Division and served as an assistant squadron commander and acting assistant commander of the 64th Cavalry Regiment for personnel. From June 1924 he served as acting regimental commander, then as chief of the regimental school of the 62nd Cavalry Regiment. During this period he fought in battles against the Basmachi movement in the region of Samarkand, Dushanbe, and the Afghan border. From September 1925 to September 1926, Kryuchyonkin completed the Cavalry Officers Improvement Course at Novocherkassk, and on his return to the division was appointed to the 44th Cavalry Regiment as chief and politruk of the regimental school. He served as secretary of the regimental party bureau between September 1927 and August 1928. In December 1928, Kryuchyonkin was sent to the Volga Military District, where he served with the 46th Cavalry Regiment of the 8th Cavalry Division as chief and politruk of the regimental school and regimental chief of staff.

Returning to the 11th Cavalry Division in January 1931, he served with it as commander and commissar of the 48th Cavalry Regiment, and assistant commander for the political section of the 45th Cavalry Regiment. From May 1933, he served as assistant commander for supply of the 13th Cavalry Regiment of the 2nd Cavalry Division of the Ukrainian Military District. From November 1934 to May 1935, Kryuchyonkin returned to studies, completing the Cavalry Senior Commanders Improvement Course at Novocherkassk. After completing the course, he was appointed assistant commander for supply of the 16th Cavalry Regiment of the 3rd Bessarabia Cavalry Division of the Kiev Military District. In April 1936 he transferred to serve as chief of military supply of the 5th M. F. Blinov Stavropol Cavalry Division. From September 1937 he commanded the 111th Cavalry Regiment of the 28th Cavalry Division, then in June 1938 was appointed commander of the 14th Cavalry Division in the Kiev Special Military District.

=== World War II ===
After the German invasion of the Soviet Union began on 22 June 1941, Kryuchyonkin led the division in the defense of Kremenets as part of the 5th Cavalry Corps of the 6th Army of the Southwestern Front. In July its units, half-encircled, covered the retreat of units of the 36th Rifle Corps, defending against German mechanized troops in the regions of Berdichev and Kazatin. For his performance in the breakout of the division from encirclement Kryuchyonkin was awarded the Order of the Red Banner.

From November, he commanded the 5th Cavalry Corps, which, as part of Fyodor Kostenko's operational group and then the 21st and 38th Armies of the Southwestern Front, took part in the Yelets offensive. For its performance, the corps was reorganized as the elite 3rd Guards Cavalry Corps in December. Subsequently, Kryuchyonkin led the corps in the successful Barvenkovo–Lozovaya offensive, the Second Battle of Kharkov, and the Voronezh–Voroshilovgrad defensive operation. In early July Major General Kryuchyonkin was appointed commander of the 28th Army, reorganized into the 4th Tank Army late that month. The army took part in the Battle of Stalingrad and as the 4th Tank Army counterattacked the German troops breaking through to the Don north of Kalach. Then its troops took part in sustained defensive battles and were forced to retreat to the Don and organize a defense along the outer encirclement of Stalingrad from the mouth of the Ilovlya river to Vertyachy.

Kryuchyonkin was relieved of command in mid-October and began an accelerated course at the Military Academy of the General Staff in December. After completing the course in March 1943, he was appointed commander of the 69th Army, which he led during the Battle of Kursk. Kryuchyonkin was transferred to command the 10th Army on 5 April 1944 and then the 33rd Army on 12 April. That month, the 33rd Army was shifted to the Orsha axis and until the end of June defended the line of Bayevo and Dribin. During Operation Bagration, Kryuchyonkin led the army in the crossing of the Dnieper and the liberation of Shklov and Mogilev during the Mogilev offensive and the Minsk offensive. Relieved of command due to illness in July, Kryuchyonkin was sent to await assignment with the 1st Belorussian Front on recovery in December. In January 1945 he was first appointed deputy commander of the 61st Army and then front deputy commander.

=== Postwar ===
After the end of the war, Kryuchyonkin continued to serve as deputy commander of the 61st Army. In August 1945 the army headquarters was used to form that of the Don Military District, and he was appointed deputy commander of the district. In January 1946 he was placed at the disposal of the Main Personnel Directorate for health reasons, and retired in June. He lived in Kiev until his death on 10 June 1976.

== Awards ==
- Order of Lenin
- Order of the October Revolution
- Order of the Red Banner
- Order of Kutuzov
- Jubilee Medal "In Commemoration of the 100th Anniversary of the Birth of Vladimir Ilyich Lenin"
- Medal "For the Defence of Stalingrad"
- Medal "For the Defence of Kiev"
- Medal "For the Victory over Germany in the Great Patriotic War 1941–1945"
- Jubilee Medal "Twenty Years of Victory in the Great Patriotic War 1941–1945"
- Jubilee Medal "Thirty Years of Victory in the Great Patriotic War 1941–1945"
- Medal "For the Capture of Berlin"
- Medal "For the Liberation of Warsaw"
- Medal "Veteran of the Armed Forces of the USSR"
- Jubilee Medal "XX Years of the Workers' and Peasants' Red Army"
- Jubilee Medal "30 Years of the Soviet Army and Navy"
- Jubilee Medal "40 Years of the Armed Forces of the USSR"
- Jubilee Medal "50 Years of the Armed Forces of the USSR"
- Order of Noble Bukhara
