= Comparative army officer ranks of Post-Soviet states =

Rank comparison chart of all armies of Post-Soviet states.

== Officers (OF 1–10) ==
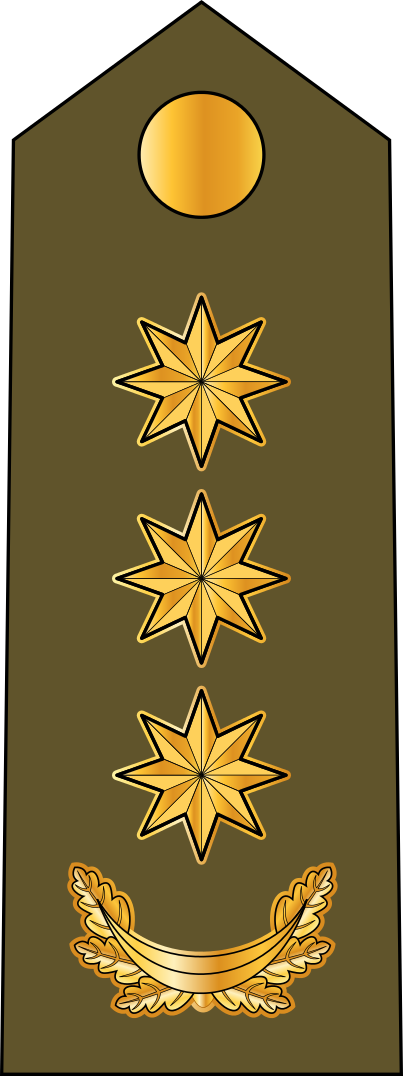
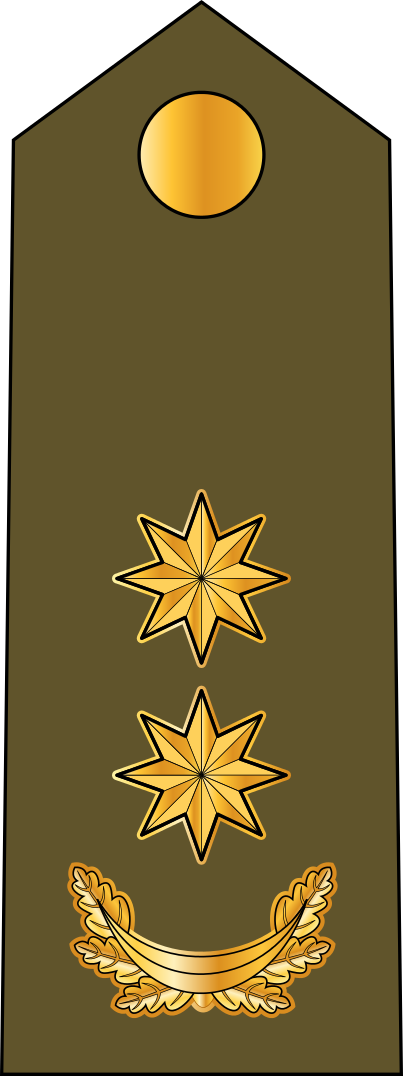
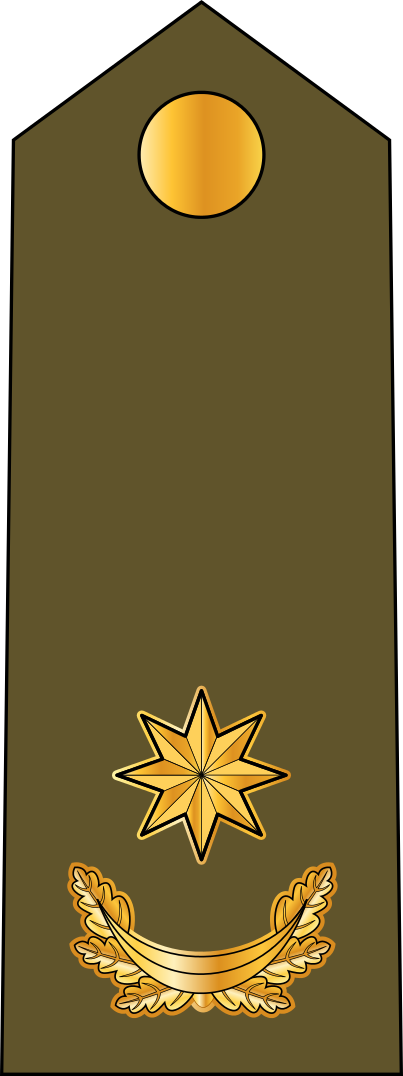
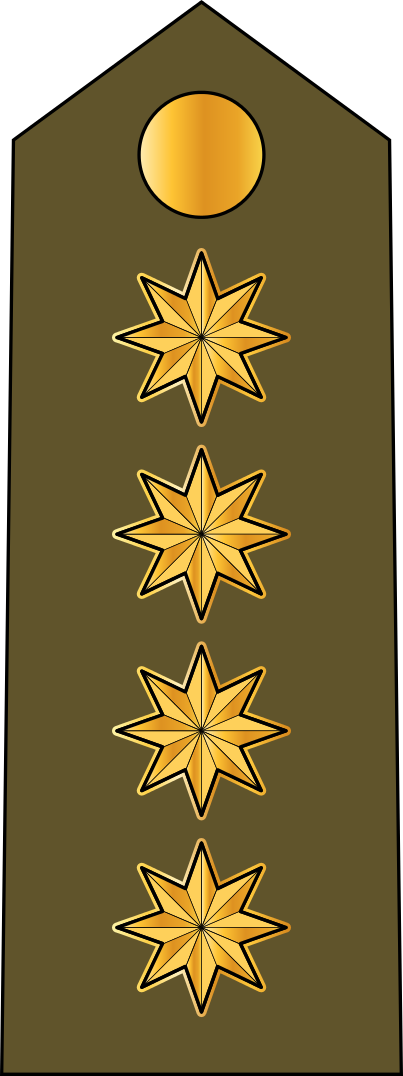
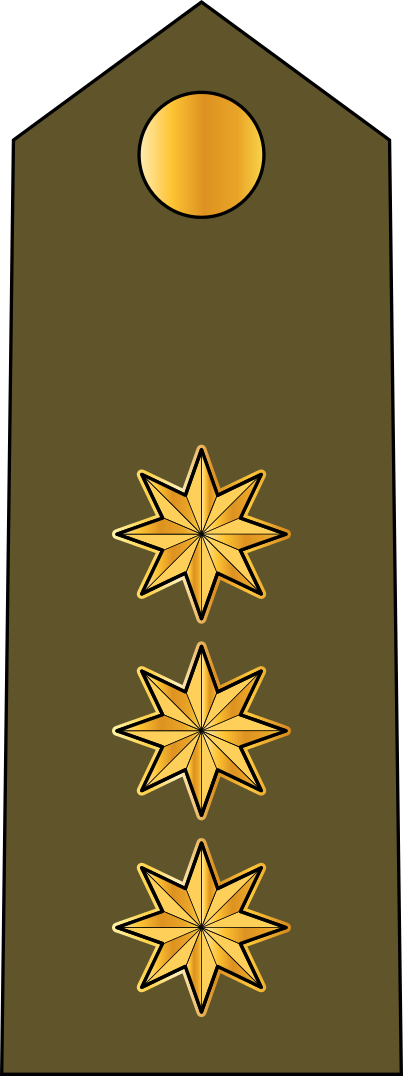
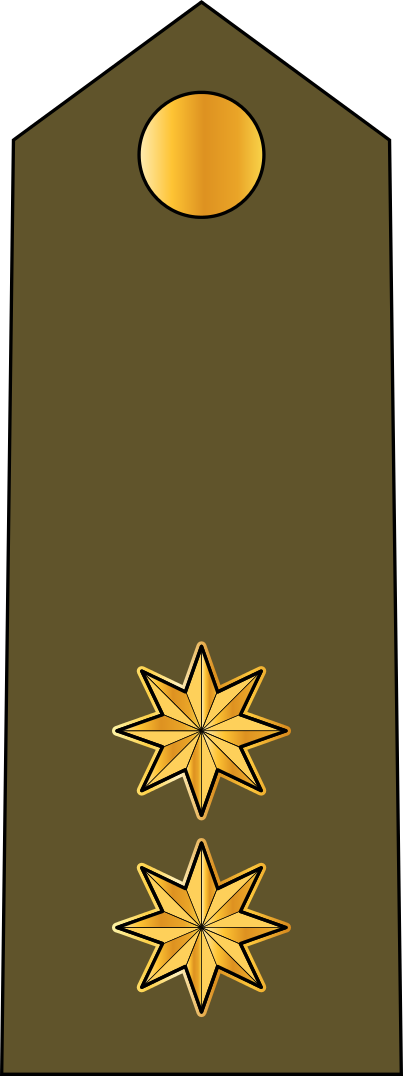
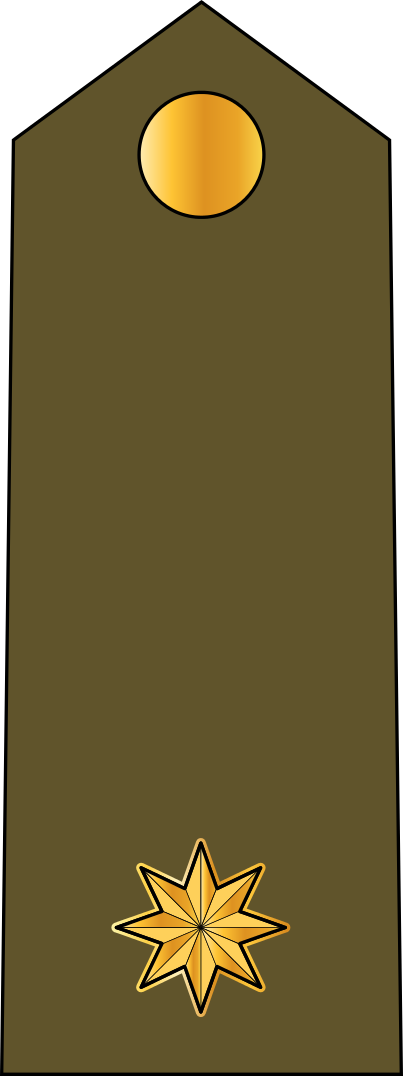
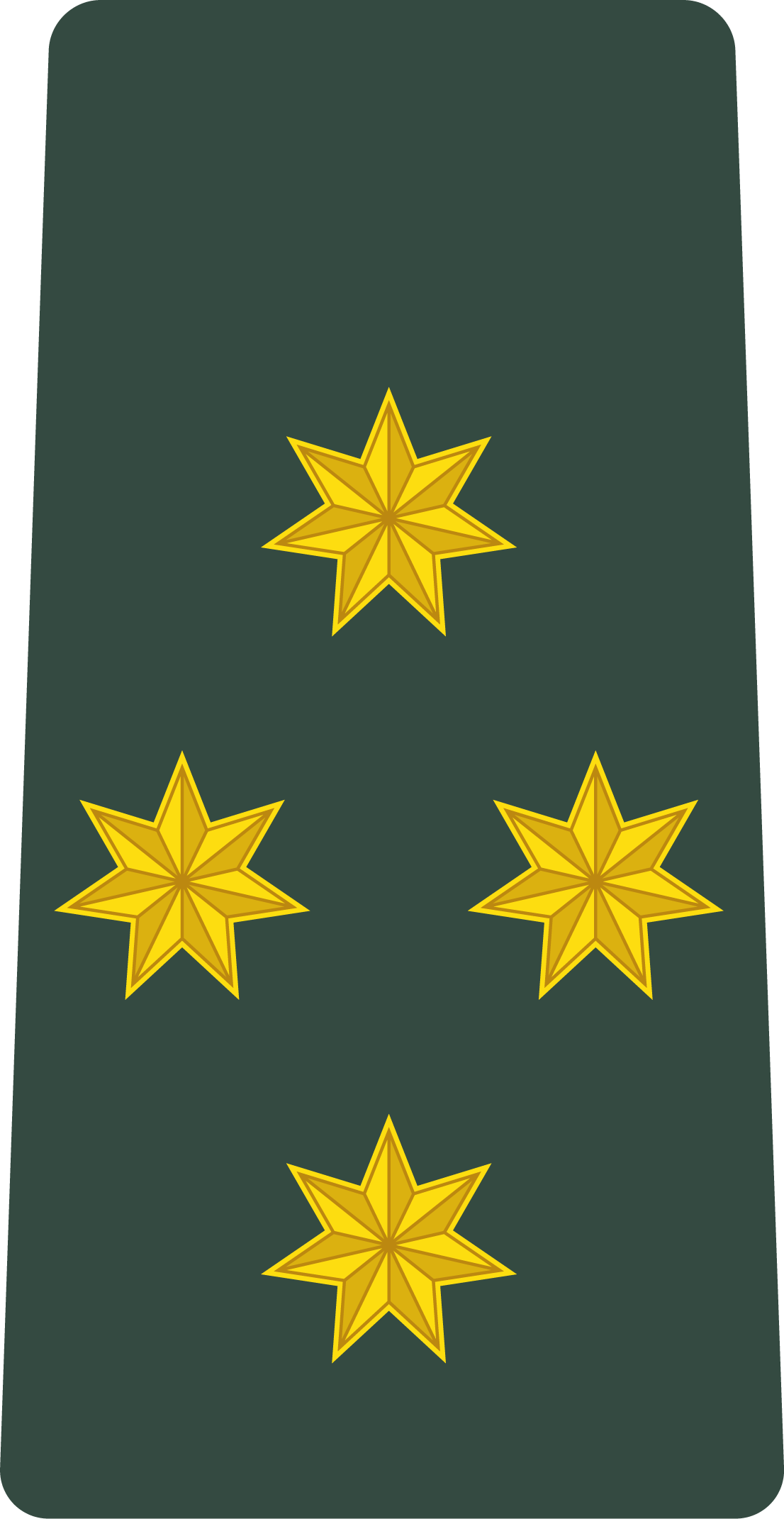
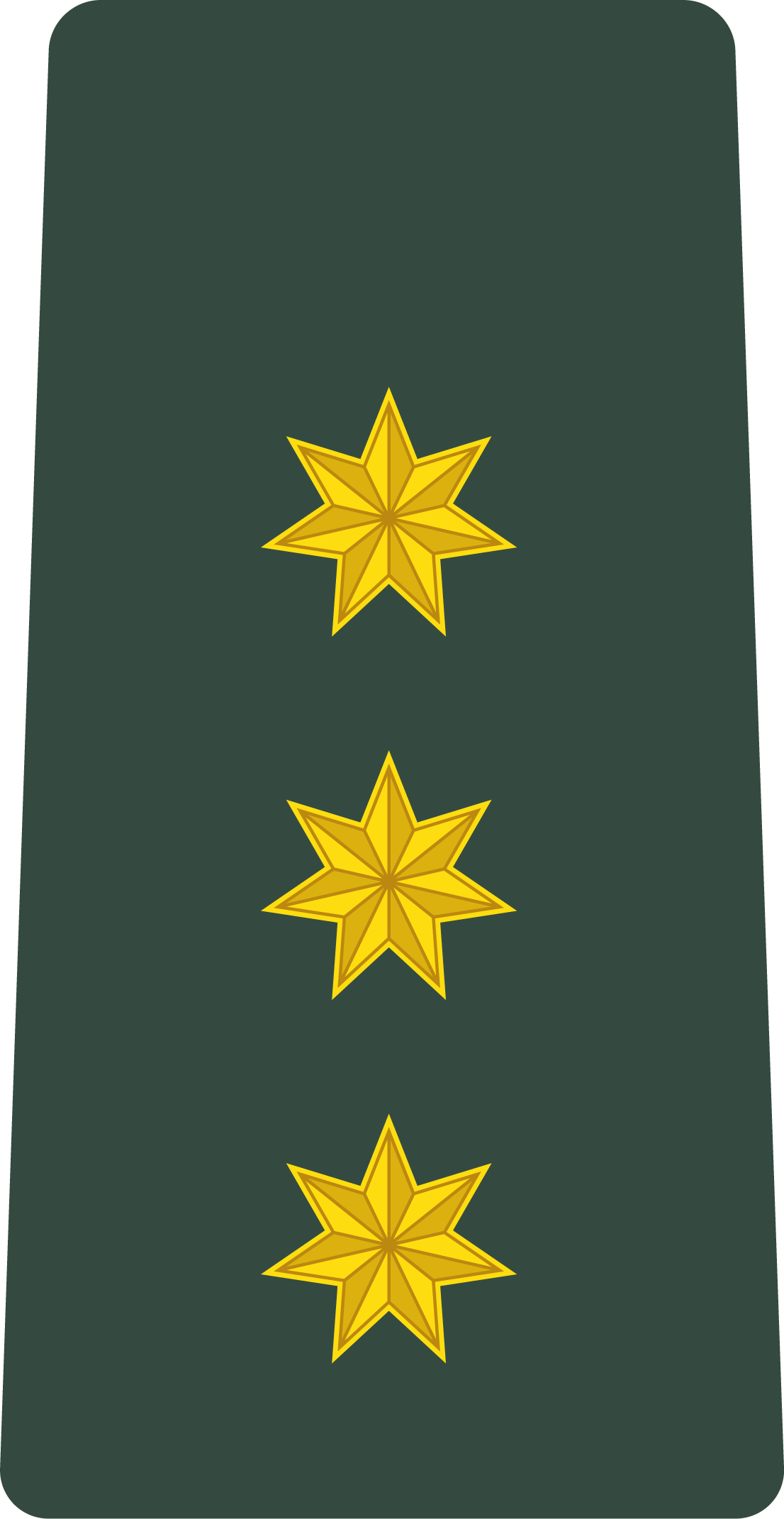
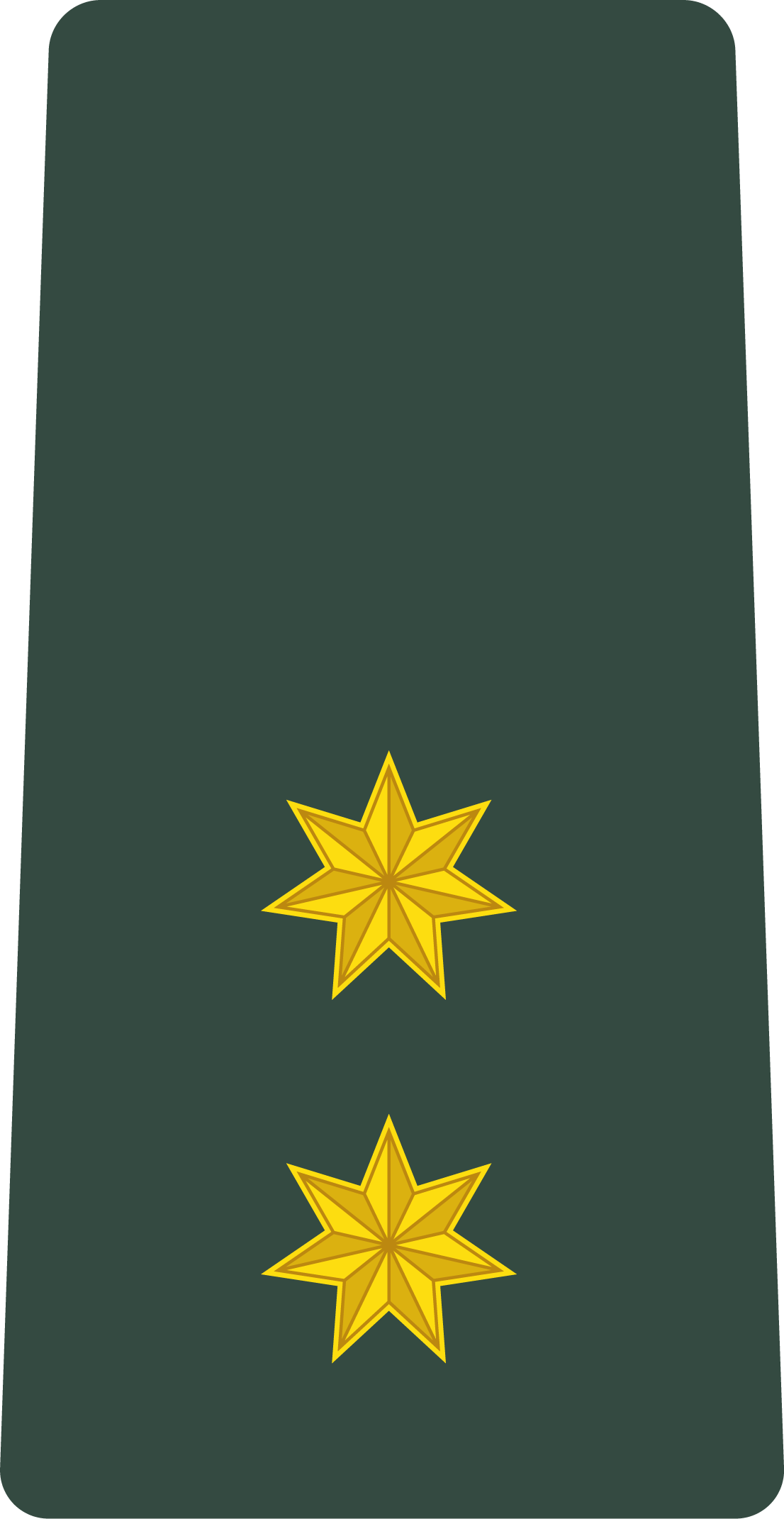
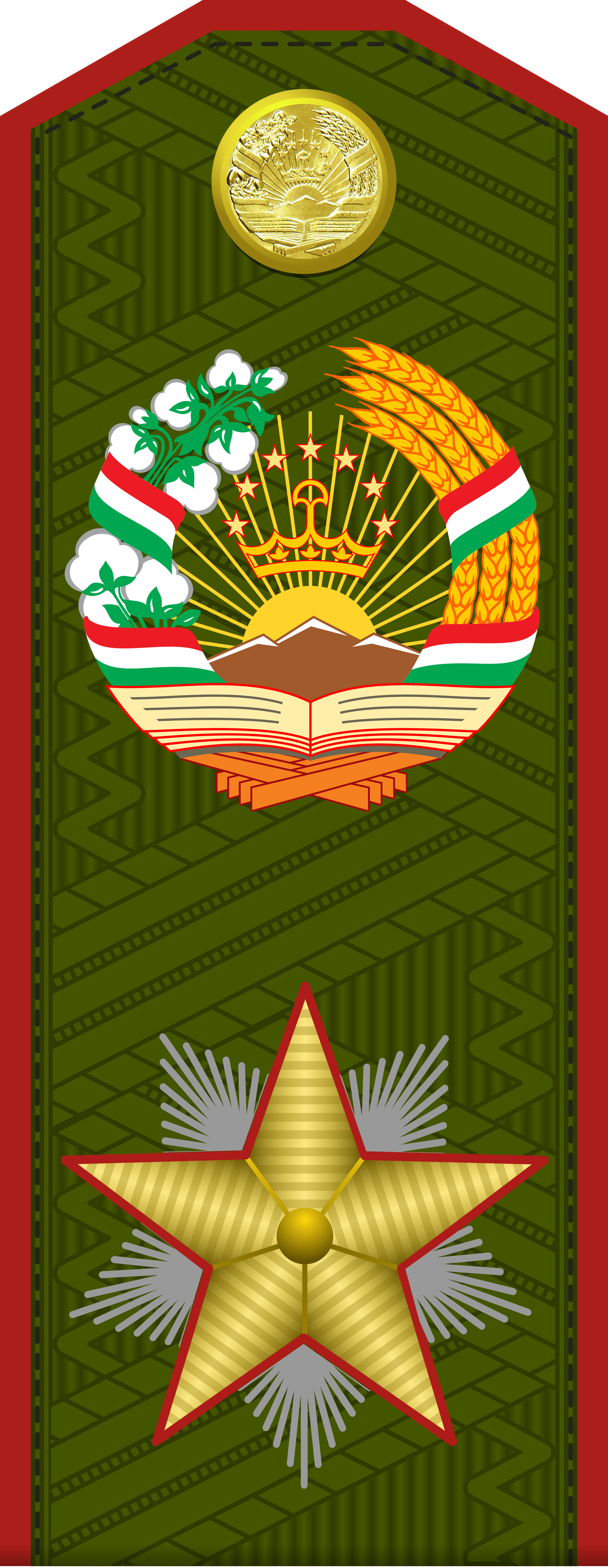
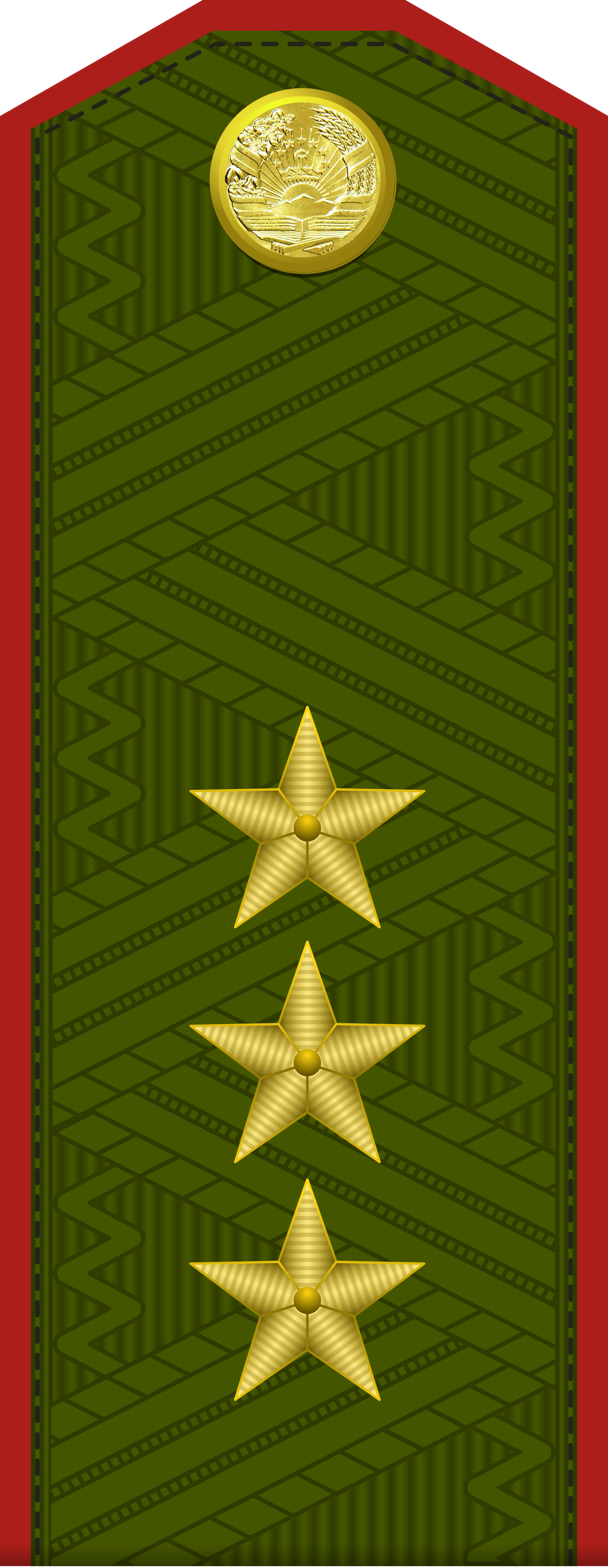
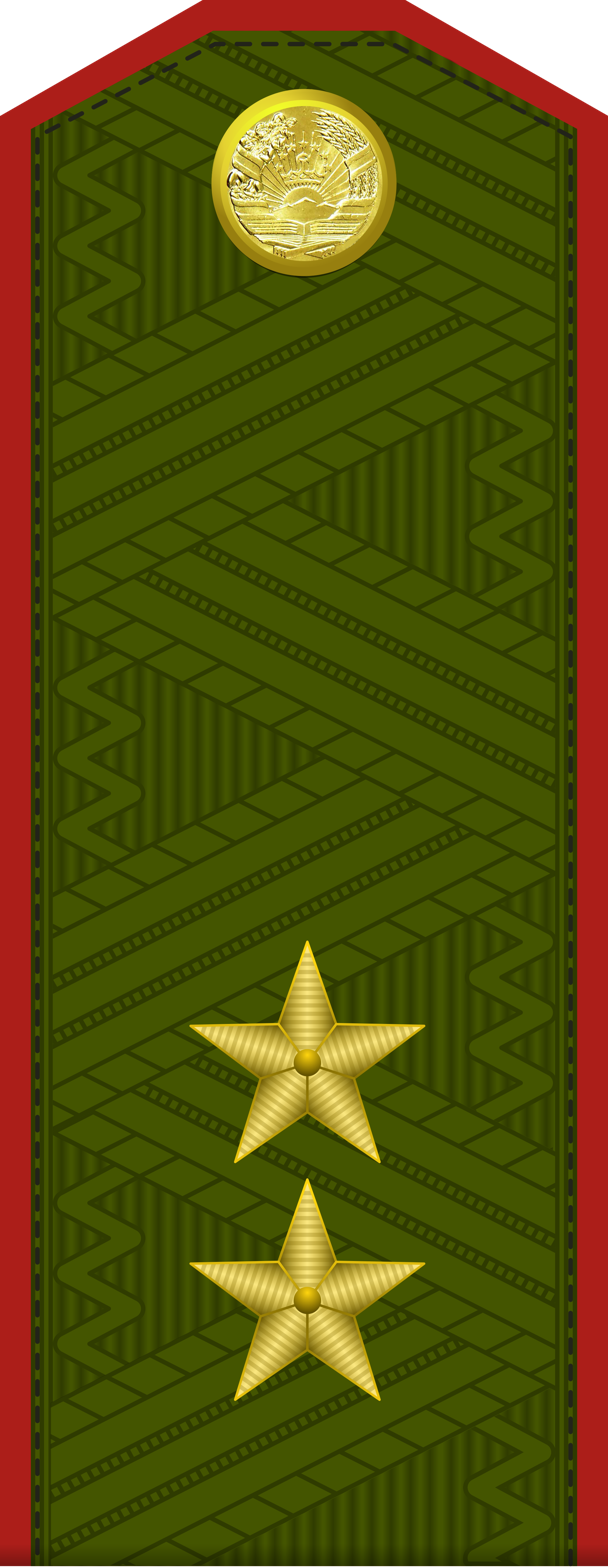
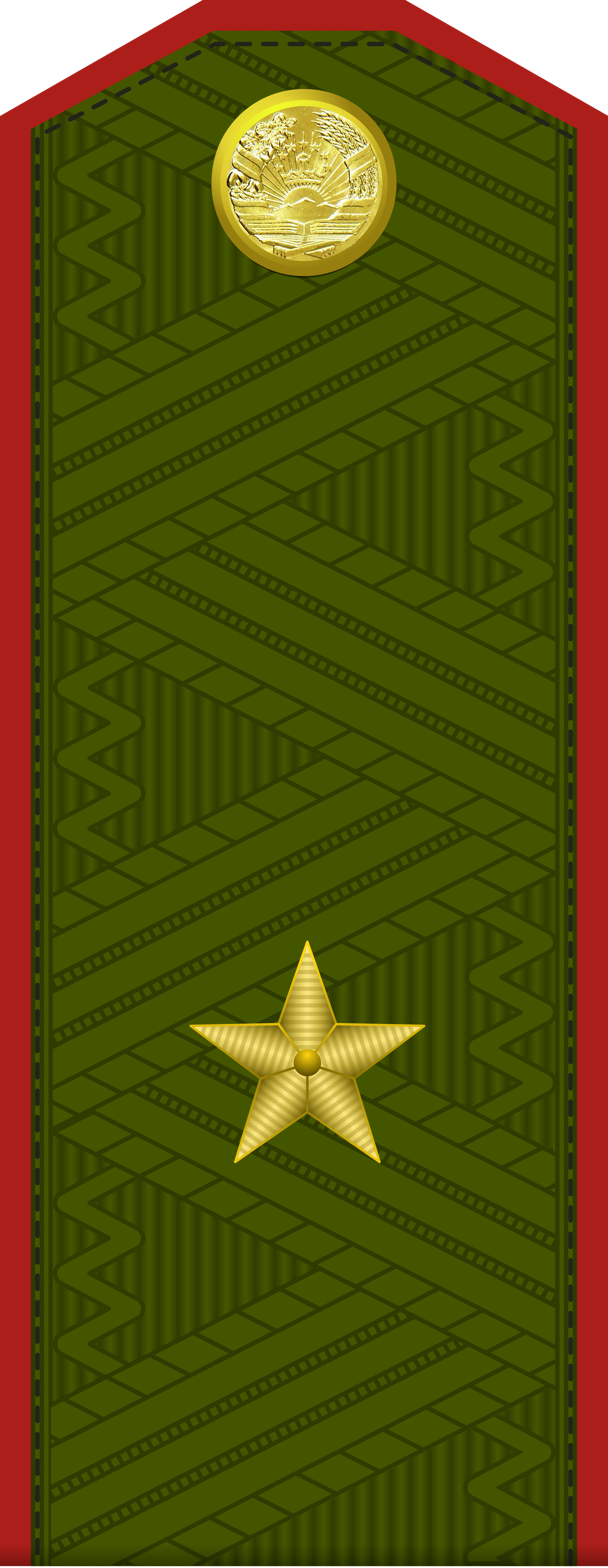
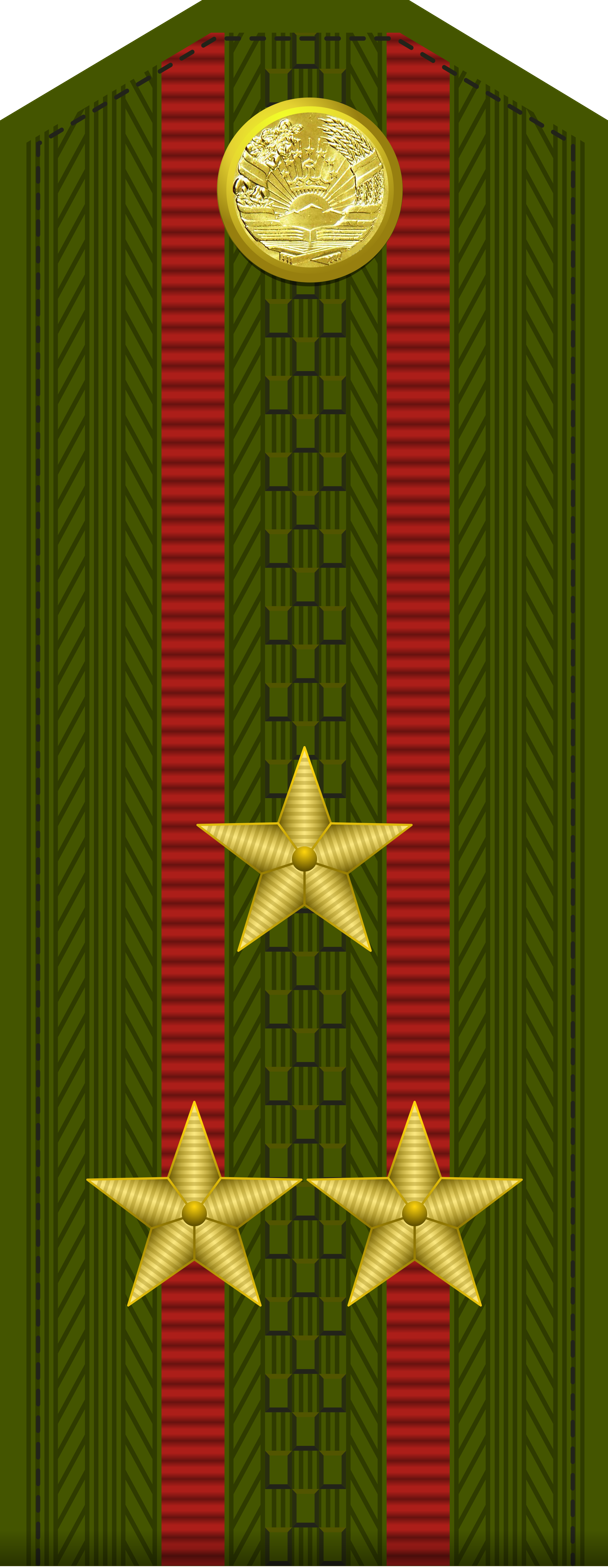
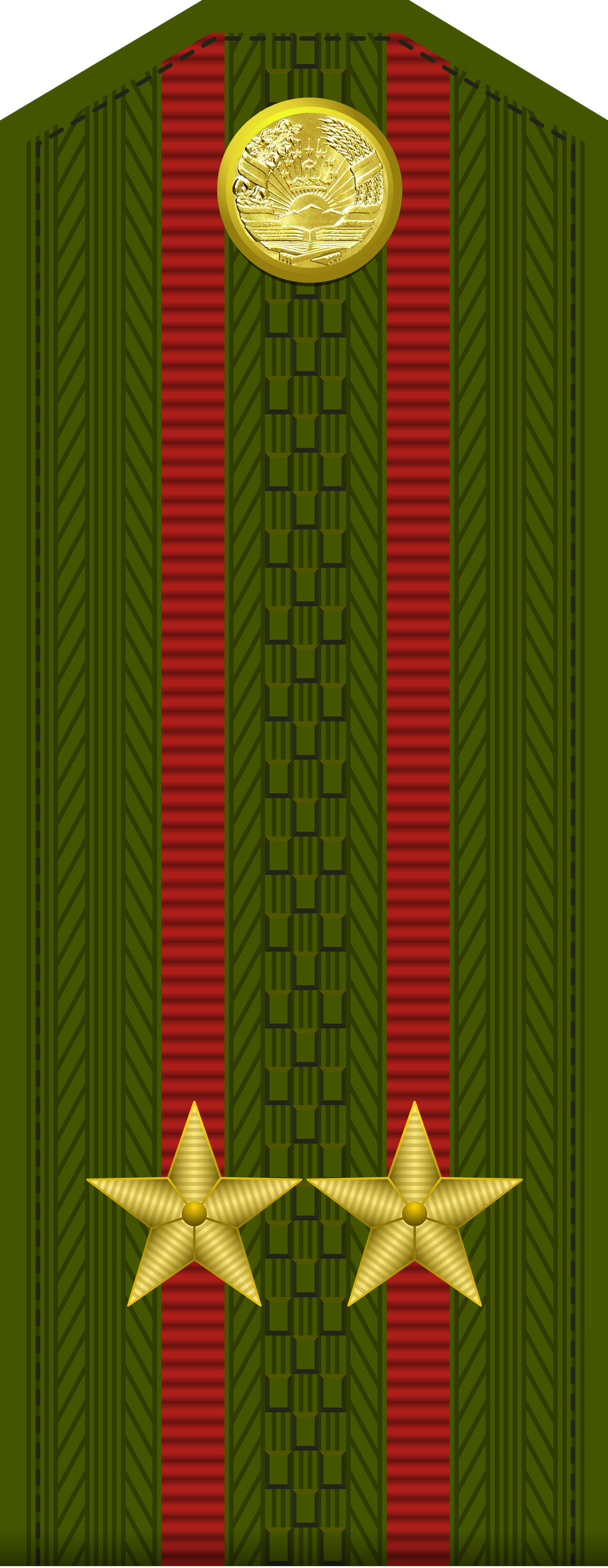
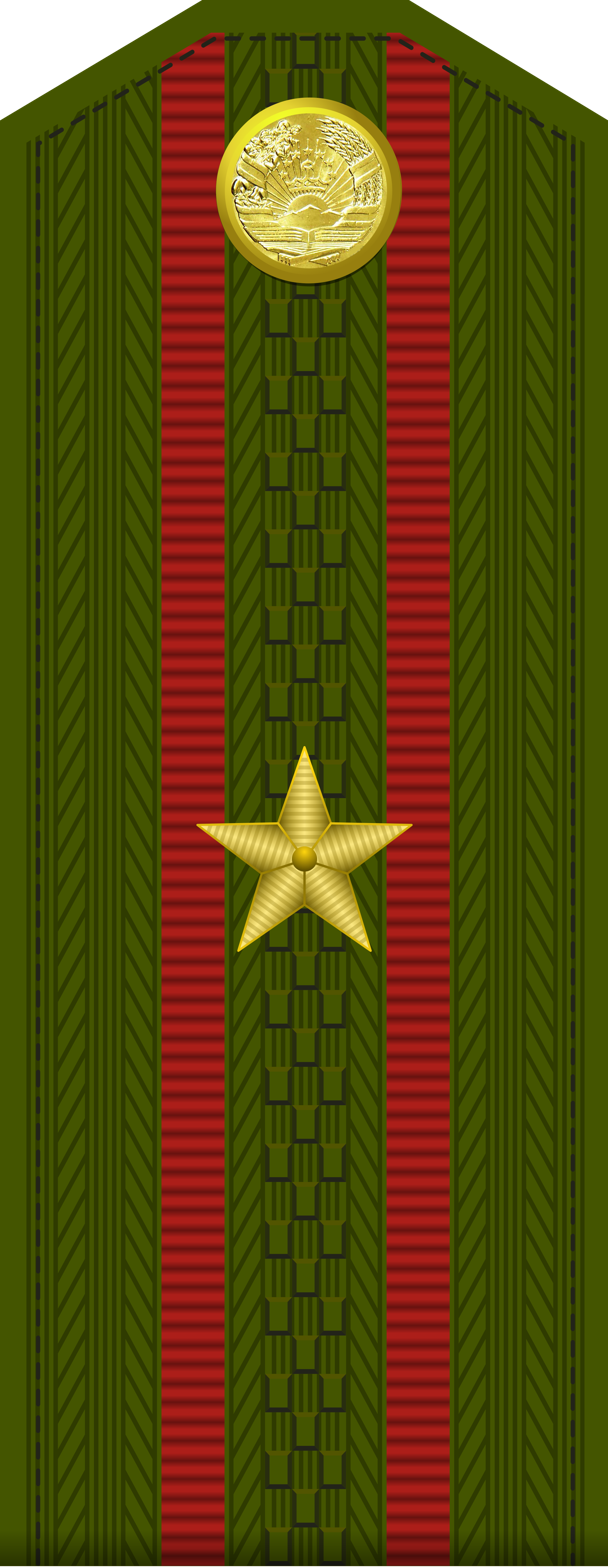
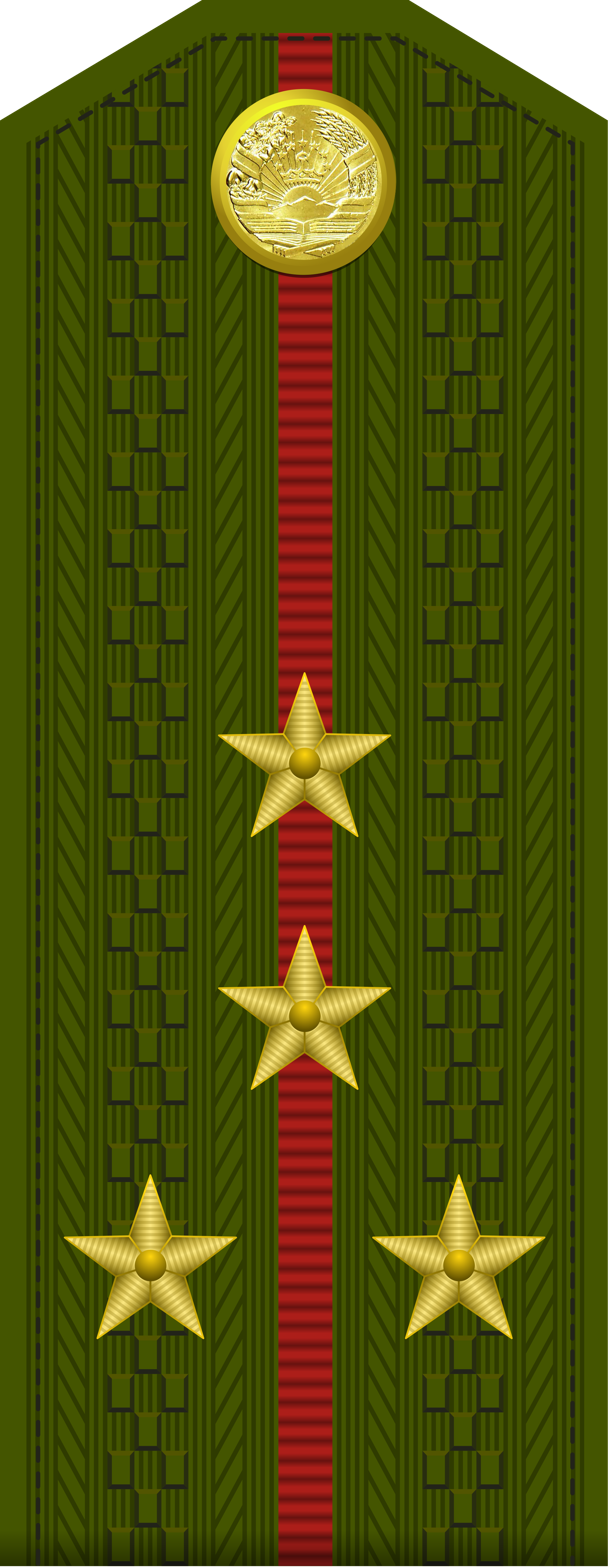
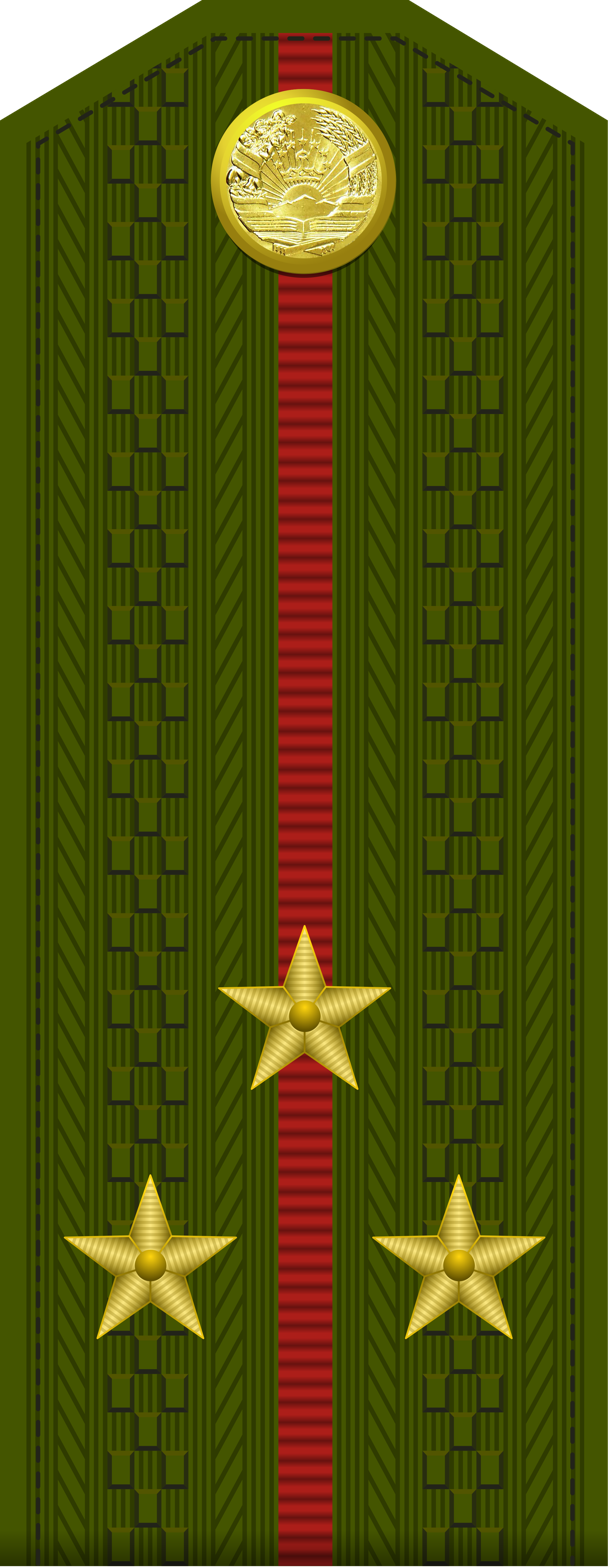
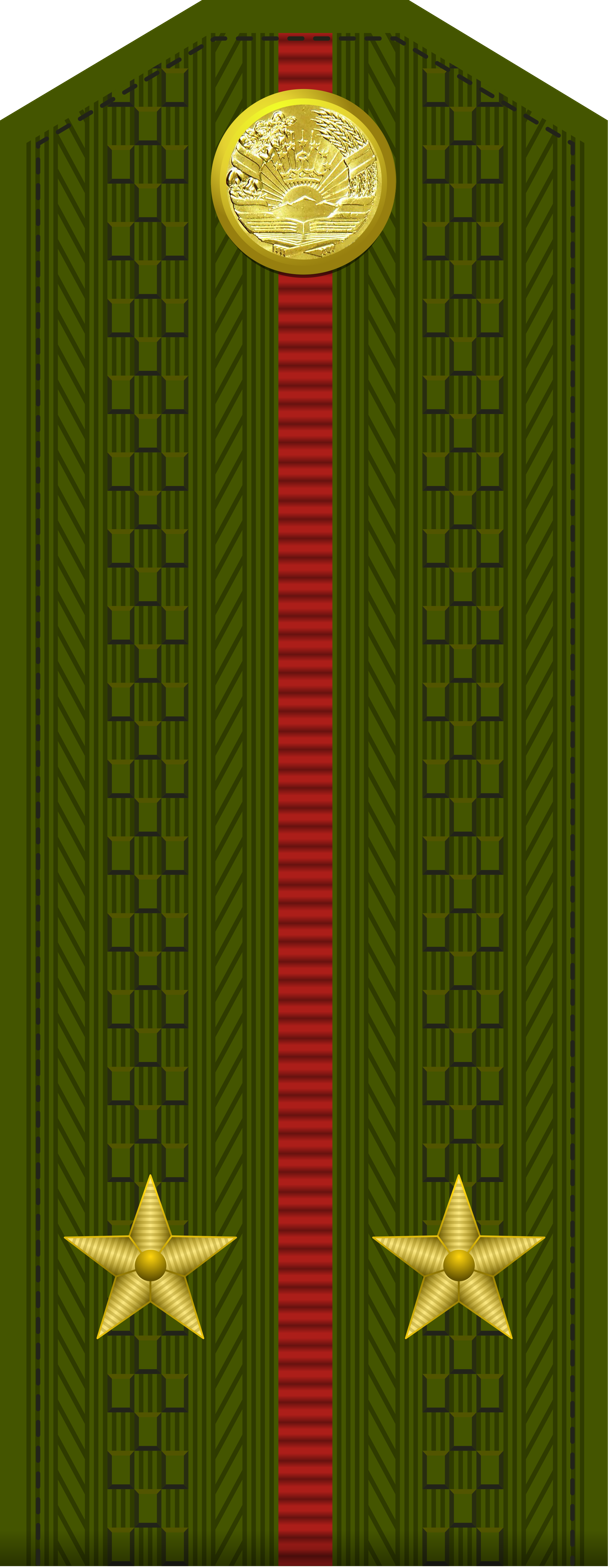
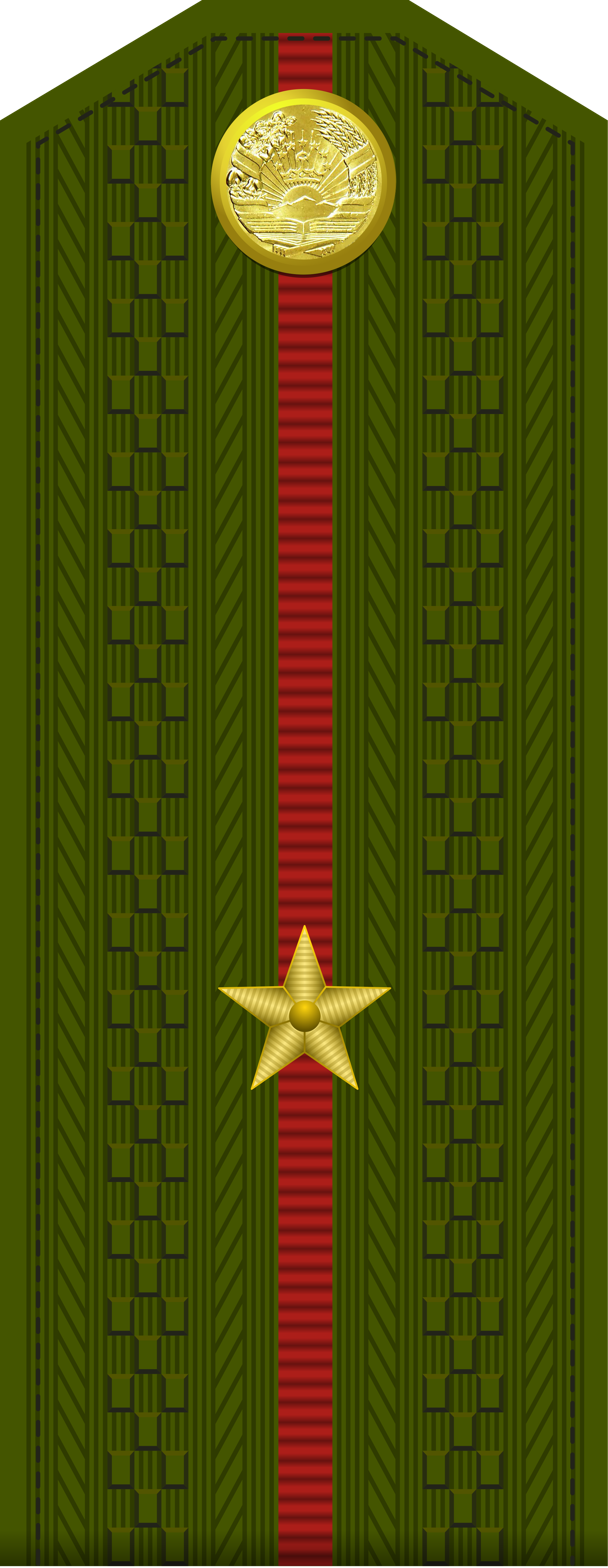
Rank group	General / flag officers					Senior officers			Junior officers
Armenian Ground Forces
Armenian Ground Forces		Բանակի գեներալ Banaki general	գեներալ-գնդապետ General-gndapet	գեներալ-լեյտենանտ General-leytenant	գեներալ-մայոր General-mayor	գնդապետ Gndapet	փոխգնդապետ P’vokhgndapet	մայոր Mayor	կապիտան Kapitan	ավագ լեյտենանտ Avag leytenant		լեյտենանտ Leytenant
Azerbaijani Land Forces
Azerbaijani Land Forces		Ordu generalı	General-polkovnik	General-leytenant	General-mayor	Polkovnik	Polkovnik-leytenant	Mayor	Kapitan	Baş leytenant	Leytenant	Kiçik leytenant
Belarusian Ground Forces
Belarusian Ground Forces	Верховный главнокомандующий Verkhovnyy glavnokomanduyushchiy		Ґенэрал-палкоўнік; G̀jeneral-palkoŭnik	Ґенэрал-лейтэнант; G̀jeneral-liejtenant	Ґенэрал-маёр; G̀jeneral-major	Палкоўнік; Palkoŭnik	Падпалкоўнік; Padpalkoŭnik	Маёр; Major	Капітан; Kapitan	Старшы лейтэнант Staršy liejtenant	Лейтэнант; Liejtenant	Малодшы лейтэнант Malodšy liejtenant
Estonian Land Forces
Estonian Land Forces		Kindral	Kindralleitnant	Kindralmajor	Brigaadikindral	Kolonel	Kolonelleitnant	Major	Kapten	Leitnant	Nooremleitnant	Lipnik
Georgian Land Forces
Georgian Land Forces		არმიის გენერალი Armiis generali	გენერალ ლეიტენანტი General leit’enant’i	გენერალ-მაიორი General-maiori	ბრიგადის გენერალი Brigadis generali	პოლკოვნიკი P’olk’ovnik’i	ვიცე-პოლკოვნიკი Vitse-p’olk’ovnik’i	მაიორი Maiori	კაპიტანი K’ap’it’ani	უფროსი ლეიტენანტი Uprosi leit’enant’i		ლეიტენანტი Leit’enant’i
Rank group	General / flag officers					Senior officers			Junior officers
Kazakh Ground Forces
Kazakh Ground Forces	Жоғарғы Бас қолбасшының Joğarğı Bas qolbasşınıñ	Армия генералы Armïya generalı	Генерал-Полҝвниҝ; General-polkovnïk	Генерал-лейтенант; General-leytenant	Генерал-майор; General-mayor	Полковник; Polkovnïk	Подполковник; Podpolkovnïk	Майор; Mayor	Капитан; Kapïtan	Аға лейтенант Ağa leytenant		Лейтенант; Leytenant
Kyrgyz Army
Kyrgyz Army					Генерал-майор; General-mayor	Полковник; Polkovnik	Подполковник; Podpolkovnik	Майор; Mayor	Капитан; Kapitan	Улук лейтенант Uluk leytenant	Лейтенант; Leytenant	Кенже лейтенант Kenje leytenant
Latvian Land Forces
Latvian Land Forces			Ģenerālleitnants	Ģenerālmajors	Brigādes ģenerālis	Pulkvedis	Pulkvežleitnants	Majors	Kapteinis	Virsleitnants		Leitnants
Lithuanian Land Force
Lithuanian Land Force		Generolas	Generolas leitenantas	Generolas majoras	Brigados generolas	Pulkininkas	Pulkininkas leitenantas	Majoras	Kapitonas	Vyresnysis leitenantas		Leitenantas
Moldovan Ground Forces
Moldovan Ground Forces			General de corp de armată	General de divizie	General de brigadă	Colonel	Locotenent-colonel	Maior	Căpitan	Locotenent-major		Locotenent
Rank group	General / flag officers					Senior officers			Junior officers
Russian Ground Forces
Russian Ground Forces	Маршал Российской Федерации; Marshal Rossiyskoy Federatsii	Генерал армии General armii	Генерал-полковник; General-polkovnik	Генерал-лейтенант; General-leytenant	Генерал-майор; General-mayor	Полковник; Polkovnik	Подполковник; Podpolkovnik	Майор; Mayor	Kапитан; Kapitan	Старший лейтенант Starshiy leytenant	Лейтенант; Leytenant	Mладший лейтенант Mladshiy leytenant
Tajik Ground Forces
Tajik Ground Forces		Генерали артиш Generali artish	Генерал-полковник; General-polkovnik	Генерал-лейтенант; General-leytenant	Генерал-майор; General-mayor	Полковник; Polkovnik	Подполковник; Podpolkovnik	Майор; Mayor	Капитан; Kapitan	Лейтенанти калон Leytenanti kalon	Лейтенант; Leytenant	Лейтенанти хурд Leytenanti xurd
Turkmen Ground Forces
Turkmen Ground Forces		Goşun generaly	General-polkownik	General-leýtenant	General-maýor	Polkownik	Podpolkownik	Maýor	Kapitan	Uly leýtenant	Leýtenant	Kiçi leýtenant
Ukrainian Ground Forces
Ukrainian Ground Forces		Генерал; Heneral	Генерал-лейтенант; Heneral-leitenant	Генерал-майор; Heneral-maior	Бригадний генерал Bryhadnyi heneral	Полковник; Polkovnyk	Підполковник; Pidpolkovnyk	Майор; Maior	Капітан; Kapitan	Старший лейтенант Starshyi leitenant	Лейтенант; Leitenant	Молодший лейтенант Molodshyi leitenant
Uzbek Ground Forces
Uzbek Ground Forces		Armiya generali	General-polkovnik	General-leytenant	General-mayor	Polkovnik	Podpolkovnik	Mayor	Kapitan	Katta leytenant		Leytenant
Rank group	General / flag officers					Senior officers			Junior officers

== See also ==
- Comparative army officer ranks of Asia
- Comparative army officer ranks of Europe
