= Bobojon Saidzoda =

Lieutenant general Bobojon Abdukodir Saidzoda (Tajik: Бобоҷон Абдуқодир Саидзода) is a Tajikistani general who currentlон as the Chief of the General Staff of the Armed Forces of Tajikistan since 23 January 2025.

From November 24, 2015 to February 9, 2018, he held the position of Commander of the Tajikistani Ground Forces. On February 9, 2018, in a midst of a military reshuffle, he was made Deputy Minister of Defence of Tajikistan for Logistics. On February 28, 2024, he was dismissed from the post of First Deputy Director of the Agency for the Provision of Special Property under the Government of Tajikistan. On 23 January 2025, President Emomali Rahmon promoted incumbent Chief of the General Staff Emomali Sobirzoda to the post of Minister of Defence, replacing Sherali Mirzo. As part of the reshuffle, Saidzoda was promoted replace Sobirzoda in this position.

In July 2025, Saidzoda visited Rawalpindi Cantonment (in Rawalpindi, Pakistan), where he met with Chairman Joint Chiefs of Staff Committee General Sahir Shamshad Mirza to expand defense cooperation. In June 2026, he chaired a nationa conference in Dushanbe focused on incorporating artificial intelligence into security and military planning.
