= Zarif Sharifzoda =

Tajik general

- Зариф Шарифзода

Chief of the General Staff
- In office 18 January 2014 – 24 November 2015
- President: Emomali Rahmon
- Preceded by: Ramil Nadyrov
- Succeeded by: Emomali Sobirzoda

Personal details
- Born: Zarif Tairovich Bobokalonov; 3 November 1970 Tajik SSR, Soviet Union
- Died: 18 January 2017 (aged 46) Dushanbe, Tajikistan
- Children: 3

Military service
- Allegiance: Tajikistan
- Branch/service: Armed Forces of Tajikistan
- Rank: Major General
- Battles/wars: Tajikistani Civil War

Major General Zarif Sharifzoda (Tajik: Зариф Шарифзода) was a Tajik general who was the former Chief of the General Staff of the Armed Forces of the Republic of Tajikistan.

== Biography ==
He was born Zarif Tairovich Bobokalonov on 3 November 1970 in Soviet Tajikistan. His military career first took off in the early 2000s, when he was appointed as Deputy Chief of the General Staff. On top of that, in 2010, Sharifzoda was made the Head of the Operational Directorate of the General Staff of Tajikistan, a position he would serve in for 2 years before leaving the country in 2012 to go and study at Russia's general staff academy in Moscow. On 18 January 2014 President Emomali Rahmon appointed him as his Chief of the General Staff, overseeing all four military branches of the armed forces. That same year, he changed his name from his family name, Bobokalonov, to Sharifzoda, which was a result of Rahmons's efforts to de-Russification the country's culture. He was dismissed from his role on 24 November 2015, being replaced by General Emomali Sobirzoda.

He was killed in a car accident in the center of Dushanbe on 18 January 2017, when he was returning home after work and collided with another car. Sharifzoda died immediately after the accident took place.

== See also ==
- Chief of the General Staff (Tajikistan)
- Ministry of Defence (Tajikistan)
- Armed Forces of the Republic of Tajikistan
