= Samarsky Uyezd =

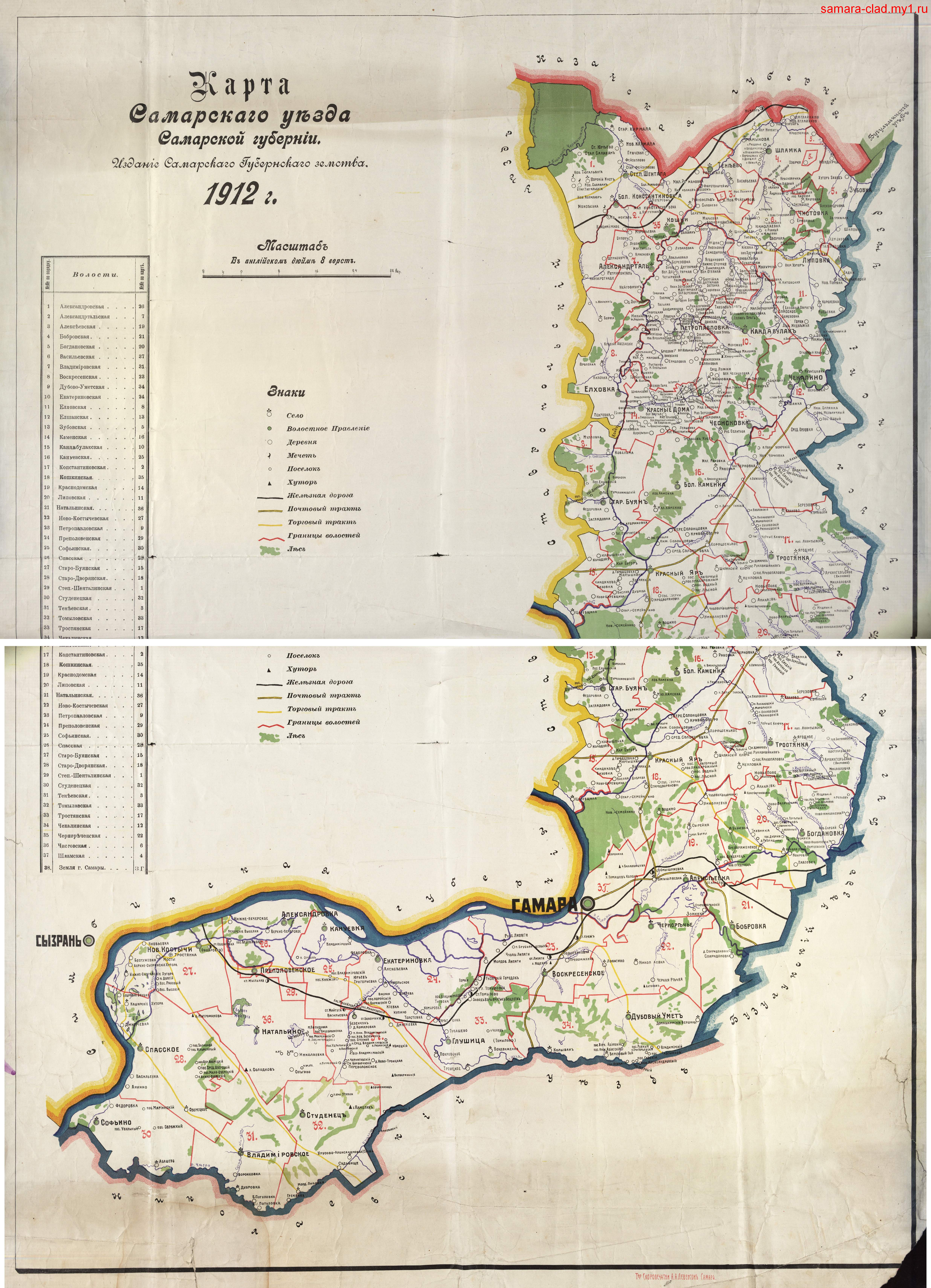
1912 map of Samarsky Uyezd

Samarsky Uyezd (Самарский уезд) was one of the subdivisions of the Samara Governorate of the Russian Empire. It was situated in the northwestern part of the governorate. Its administrative centre was Samara.

== Demographics ==
At the time of the Russian Empire Census of 1897, Samarsky Uyezd had a population of 357,018. Of these, 83.2% spoke Russian, 5.6% Mordvin, 3.9% Tatar, 2.4% Ukrainian, 2.2% Chuvash, 1.5% German, 0.3% Estonian, 0.3% Yiddish and 0.3% Polish as their native language.
