= Emomali Sobirzoda =

Tajik military leader

- Эмомалӣ Собирзода
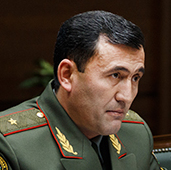
- Sobirzoda in 2017

Minister of Defense
- Incumbent
- Assumed office 23 January 2025
- President: Emomali Rahmon
- Preceded by: Sherali Mirzo

Chief of the General Staff
- In office 24 November 2015 – 23 January 2025
- President: Emomali Rahmon
- Preceded by: Zarif Bobokalonov
- Succeeded by: Bobojon Saidzoda

Personal details
- Born: 20 July 1972 (age 54) Vahdat, Tajik SSR, USSR
- Children: 3

Military service
- Allegiance: Tajikistan
- Branch: Tajikistani National Army
- Service years: 1992–present
- Rank: Lieutenant General
- Conflicts: Tajikistani Civil War; Afghanistan–Tajikistan border skirmishes

Emomali Abdurahim Sobirzoda (Tajik: Эмомалӣ Абдурраҳим Собирзода; born July 20, 1972) is the current Minister of Defence of Tajikistan. He previously served as the Chief of the General Staff from November 2015 to January 2025.

== Early life ==
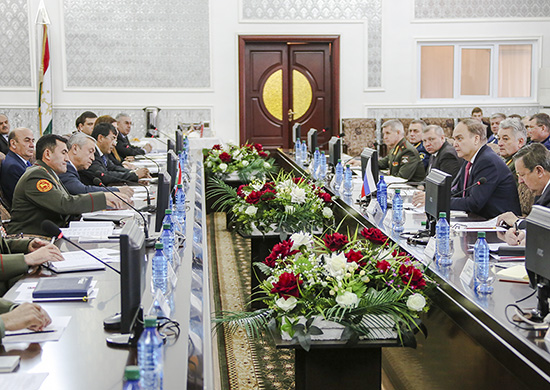
Sobirzoda in a bilateral meeting with Anatoly Antonov.

Sobirzoda was born on July 20, 1972, in the city of Vahdat to a family of labor workers. From 1987-1990, he was a student of Secondary Vocational and Technical School No. 70, in Mozhaisk, within the Russian Soviet Federative Socialist Republic (now the Russian Federation). After graduating, he became a printer at Printing House No. 1, Dushanbe. He briefly served in the Soviet Army and the short lived United Armed Forces of the Commonwealth of Independent States as a deputy platoon commander of a military unit in Zhambyl (now Taraz), Kazakhstan.

== Military career ==
He commenced his military career in 1992, immediately serving in military units that were deployed during the Tajikistani Civil War. He graduated from the Military Institute (then military college) of the Ministry of Defence of Tajikistan, and from Kulob State University in the mid-1990s before moving to Russia where he would stay from 1999 to 2001 as a cadet in the Military Academy of the General Staff of the Armed Forces of Russia, where he majored in Military and Administrative Management.

From 1993-1999, he served in the 4th Training Rifle Brigade, serving as training platoon commander, company commander, battalion Chief of Staff, tank battalion commander and Deputy Head of the Weapons Training Center. Upon returning from Russia in the fall of 2001, he was appointed Head of the Armored Service of the Department of Armaments and Equipment of the Ground Forces Directorate and then later Deputy Commander of the Ground Forces for Armaments and Equipment. From 2002-2004, he was Chief of Staff and First Deputy Commander of the Ground Forces. From 2004-2007, he was Commander of the 1st Rifle Brigade and in 2007, was made Chief of Staff - First Deputy Commander of the Ground Forces. In February 2010, he was appointed to the position of Commander of the Tajik Ground Forces. He served in this position for 5 years until November 24, 2015. He was promoted to Major General in 2012.

== Chief of the General Staff ==
On November 24, 2015, by order of President Emomali Rahmon and the approval of the government, Sobirzoda was made Chief of the General Staff, succeeding Major General Zarif Bobokalonov. He oversaw the development of military relations between Tajikistan, Russia, the United States and Uzbekistan. He coordinated joint projects with the United States to counter international terrorism and strengthen bilateral security cooperation, including military cooperation and intelligence sharing, as well as training and equipping the Armed Forces. He participated in high-level talks with the commanders of the United States Central Command, Generals Joseph Votel in 2018 and Michael Kurilla in 2022. On the 25th anniversary of the armed forces on February 21, 2018, he was promoted to Lieutenant General.

== Minister of Defence ==
On 23 January 2025, he was appointed Minister of Defense. He was succeed as Chief by Bobojon Saidzoda.

== Personal life ==
He has 3 children. He is fluent in Russian and English.

== Awards ==
- Order of Spitamen (2009)
- Medal "Courage" (2003)
