= Zhukov Air and Space Defence Academy =

Air and Space Defence Academy
- Военная академия воздушно-космической обороны имени Маршала Советского Союза Г. К. Жукова
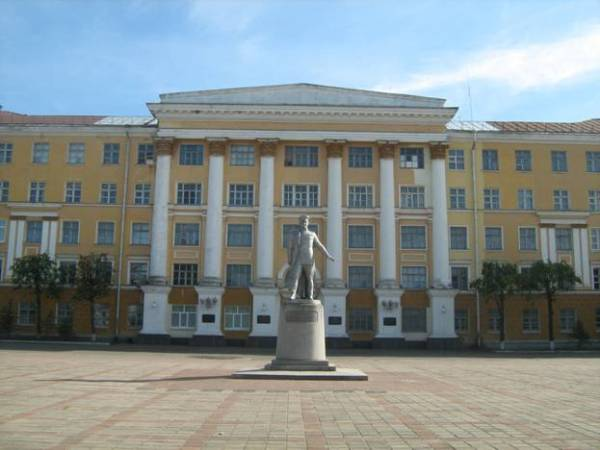
- Established: 1866
- Location: Tver, Tver Oblast, 170022, Russia; 56.851389°N 35.92°E
- Language: Russian

The Zhukov Air and Space Defence Academy (Russian: Военная академия воздушно-космической обороны имени Маршала Советского Союза Г. К. Жукова) is a Russian military academy located on the banks of the Volga River in Tver (formerly Kalinin). The academy, formed in 1956, is named after Soviet Marshal Georgy Zhukov. It was one of the main education centers of the Russian Aerospace Defence Forces, prior to the Aerospace Defence Forces restructuring in 2015. The Academy currently trains personnel for the successor organisation, the Russian Aerospace Forces.

In addition to its educational and training mandate, this academy is a research center for studying problems of operational art and tactics, as well as command, communications, and control (C3) on air defense matters.

== Notable alumni ==
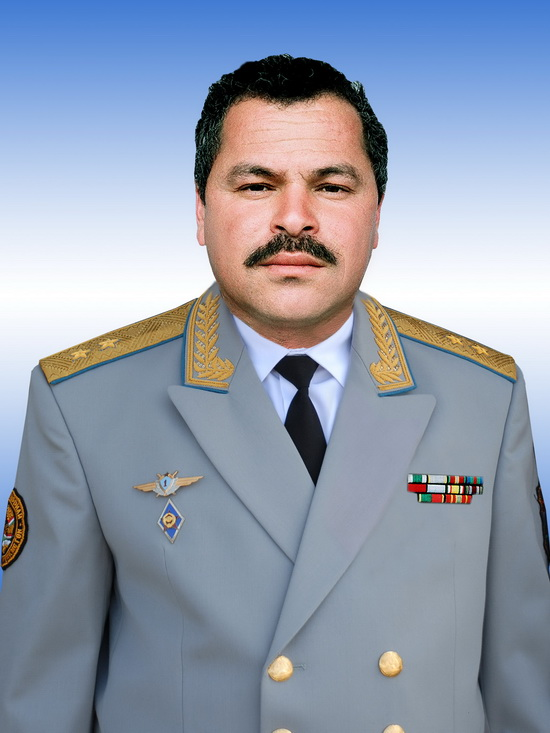
Rahmonali Safaralizoda

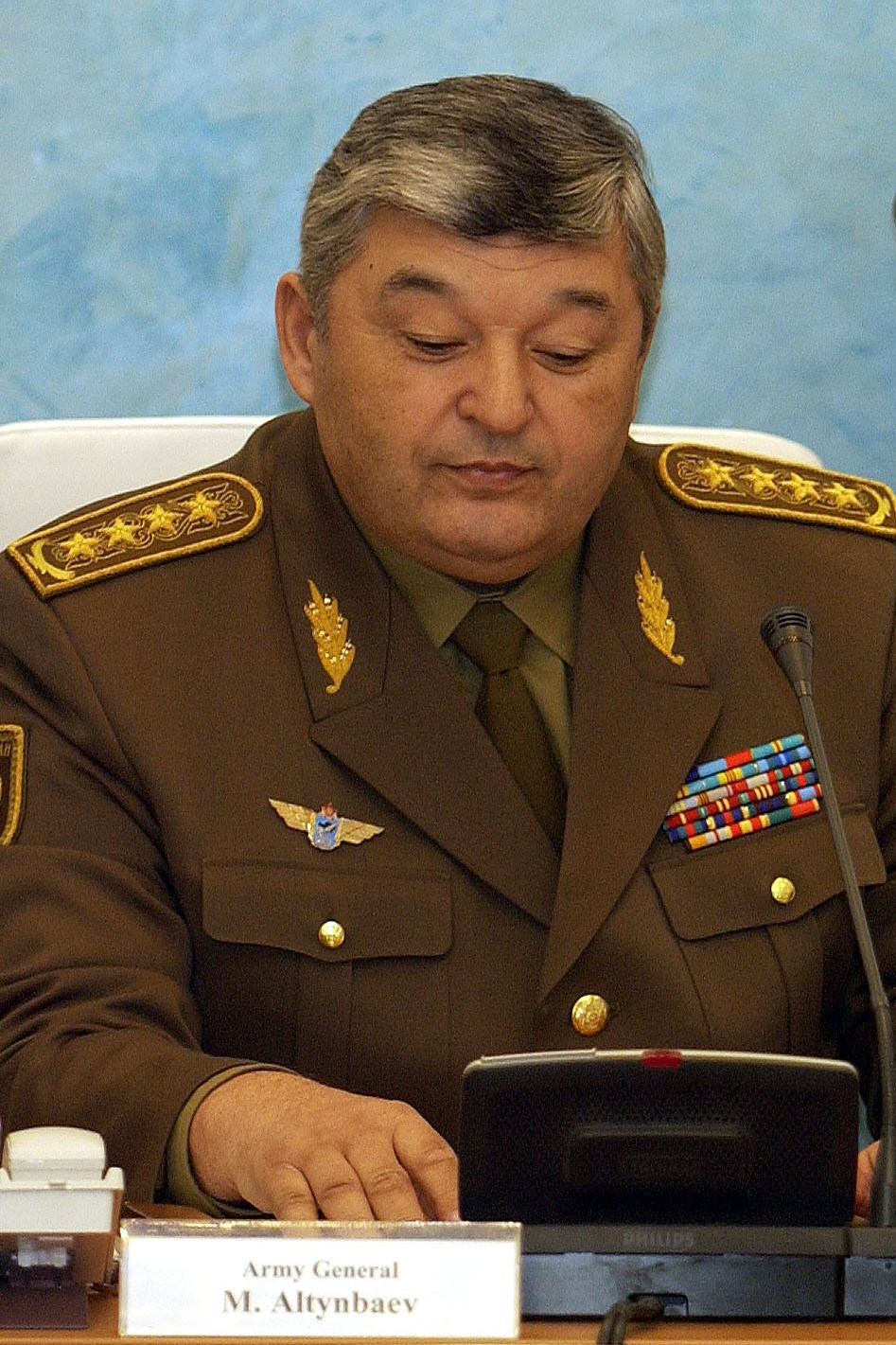
Mukhtar Altynbayev

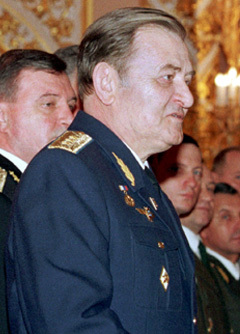
Anatoly Kornukov

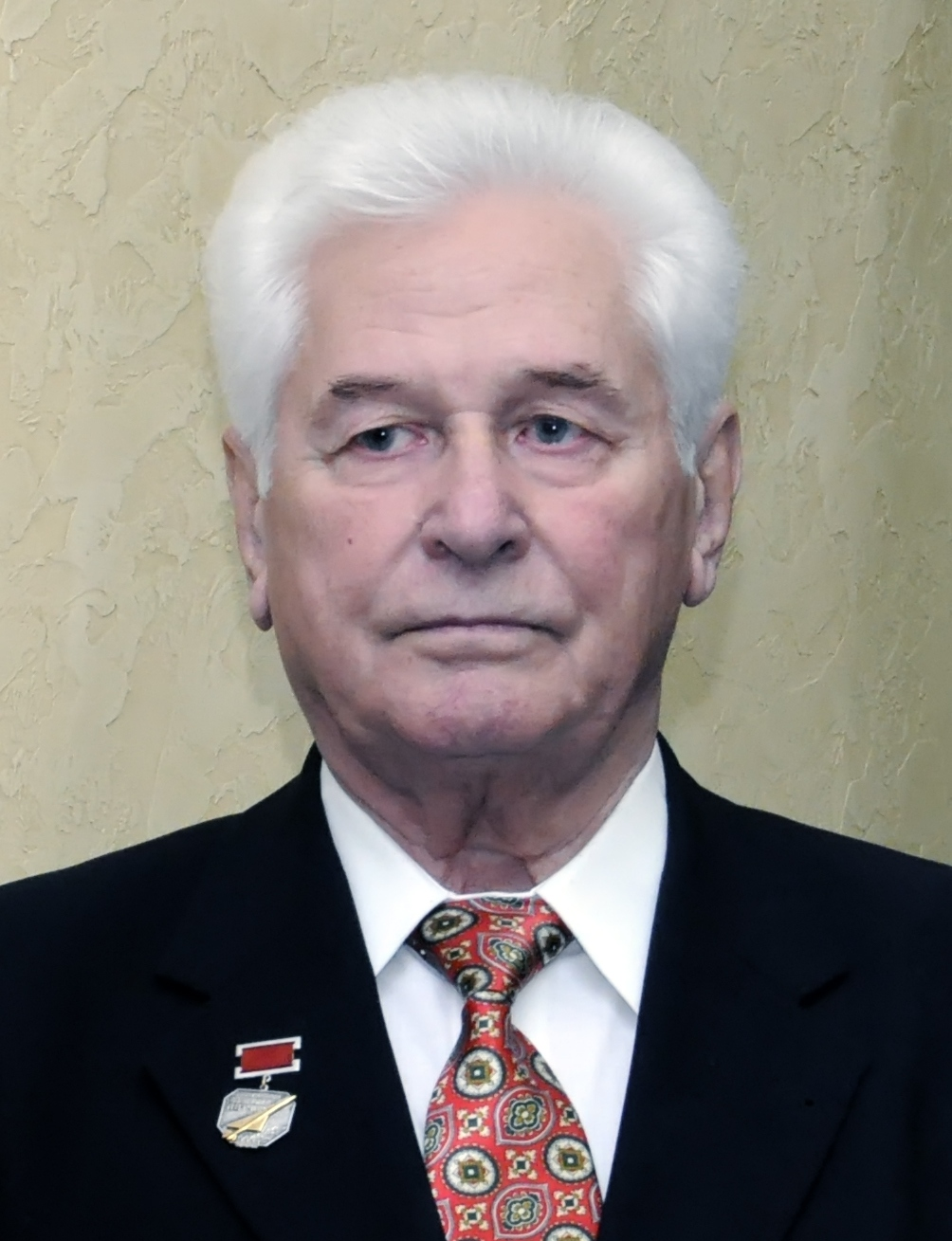
Nikolay Moskvitelev

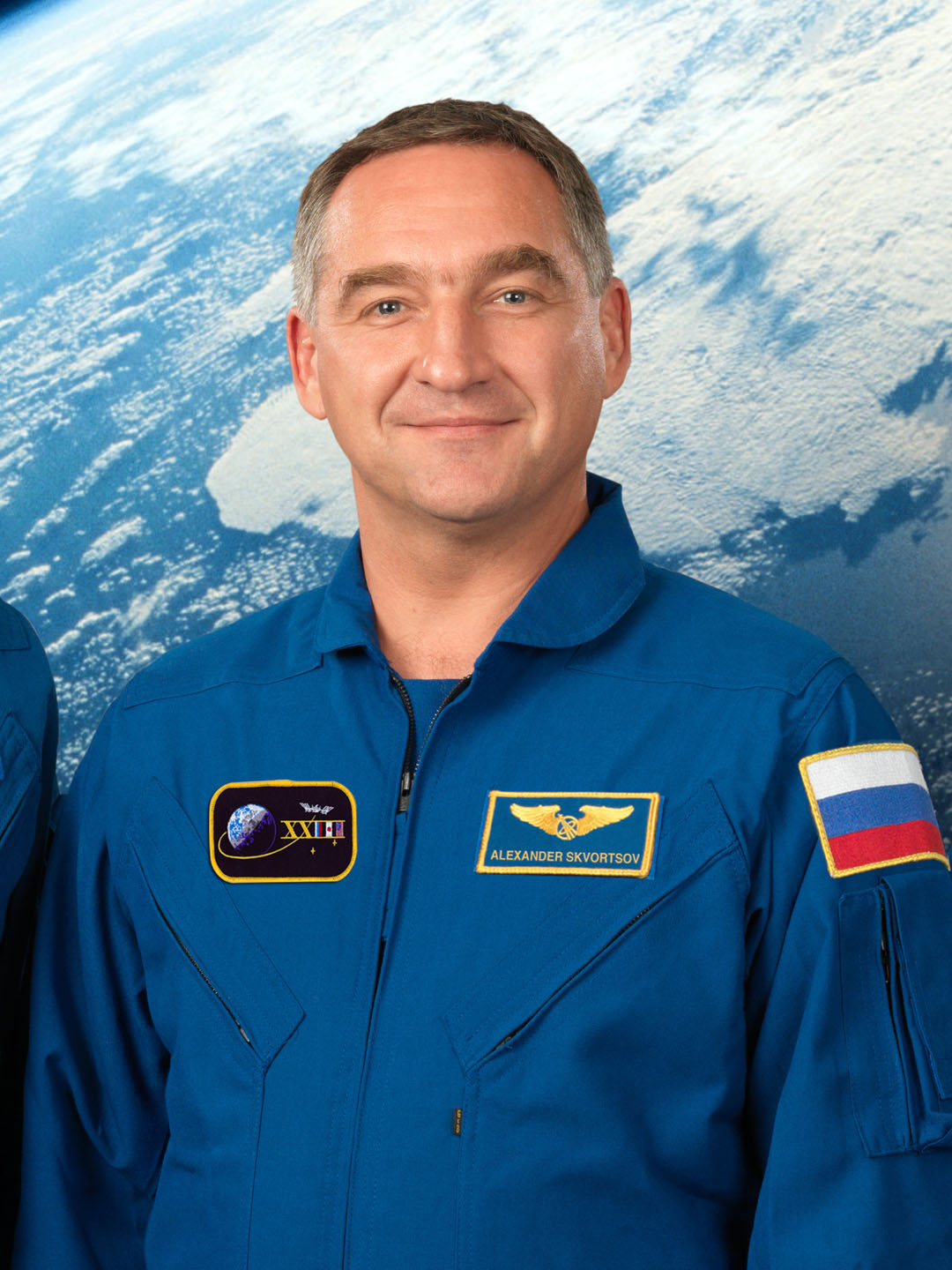
Aleksandr Skvortsov

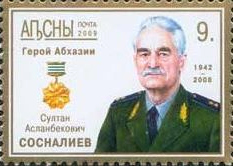
Sultan Sosnaliyev

== 2022 fire ==
On 21 April 2022 a fire destroyed buildings at the Academy with seven reported dead.
