= Bugulminsky Uyezd =

County of Orenburg, and later Samara provinces

Bugulminsky Uyezd Бугульминский уезд
- Uyezd of the Russian Empire
- 1850–1928
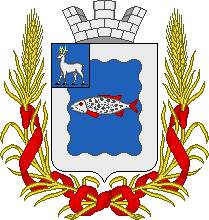
- Coat of arms

- Location within the Samara Governorate
- Capital: Bugulma
- Population
  - 1897: Samara Governorate
- History
  - Established: 1850
  - Disestablished: 14 May 1928

Bugulminsky Uyezd (Бугульминский уезд) was one of the subdivisions of the Samara Governorate of the Russian Empire. It was situated in the northeastern part of the governorate. Its administrative centre was Bugulma.

== Demographics ==
At the time of the Russian Empire Census of 1897, Bugulminsky Uyezd had a population of 299,884. Of these, 35.8% spoke Tatar, 31.7% Russian, 12.5% Mordvin, 9.9% Bashkir, 8.5% Chuvash, 0.7% Udmurt, 0.6% Turkmen and 0.2% Ukrainian as their native language.
