= Stavropolsky Uyezd (Samara Governorate) =

Stavropolsky Uyezd (Ставропольский уезд) was one of the subdivisions of the Samara Governorate of the Russian Empire. It was situated in the central part of the governorate. Its administrative centre was Stavropol (Tolyatti).

== Demographics ==
At the time of the Russian Empire Census of 1897, Stavropolsky Uyezd had a population of 283,376. Of these, 68.4% spoke Russian, 13.9% Mordvin, 13.5% Tatar, 3.9% Chuvash, 0.1% Ukrainian and 0.1% German as their native language.
