= Chief of the General Staff (Tajikistan) =

Highest-ranking military officer of Tajikistan's Armed Forces

Chief of the General Staff of the Armed Forces of the Republic of Tajikistan
- Сардори Ситоди генералии Қувваҳои Мусаллаҳ; Начальник Генерального штаба
- Flag of Tajikistan
- Incumbent; Lieutenant General Bobojon Saidzoda since 23 January 2025
- Armed Forces of the Republic of Tajikistan
- Type: Chief of the General Staff
- Member of: General Staff of the Armed Forces of the Republic of Tajikistan
- Reports to: Minister of Defence
- Residence: Dushanbe
- Appointer: President of Tajikistan
- Term length: No fixed length
- Constituting instrument: Constitution of Tajikistan
- Precursor: Chief of the General Staff of the Soviet Armed Forces
- Formation: 1994 (32 years ago)
- Website: www.mort.tj

Chief of the General Staff of the Armed Forces of the Republic of Tajikistan (Russian: Начальник Генерального штаба; Tajik: Сардори Ситоди генералӣ) is the highest-ranking military officer of the Armed Forces of the Republic of Tajikistan, and is responsible for maintaining the operational command of the military and its three major branches.

== Functions ==
The chief maintains the following functions in his/her position:

- To maintain the combat readiness of the armed forces
- To carry out military decisions made by the President and Prime Minister
- To identify threats to the country
- To develop the strength and capability of the military
- To engage in military cooperation

== List of Chiefs ==
No.	Portrait	Chief of the General Staff	Took office	Left office	Time in office	Ref.
1	Ramil Nadyrov	Lieutenant general Ramil Nadyrov (born 1967)	22 August 2001	18 January 2014	12 years, 149 days	
2	Zarif Sharifzoda	Major general Zarif Sharifzoda (1970–2017)	18 January 2014	24 November 2015	1 year, 310 days	
3	Emomali Sobirzoda	Lieutenant general Emomali Sobirzoda (born 1972)	24 November 2015	23 January 2025	9 years, 60 days	
4	Bobojon Saidzoda	Lieutenant general Bobojon Saidzoda	23 January 2025	Incumbent	1 year, 257 days	

== See also ==
- Armed Forces of the Republic of Tajikistan
- Ministry of Defence (Tajikistan)
- National Guard (Tajikistan)
