= Buguruslansky Uyezd =

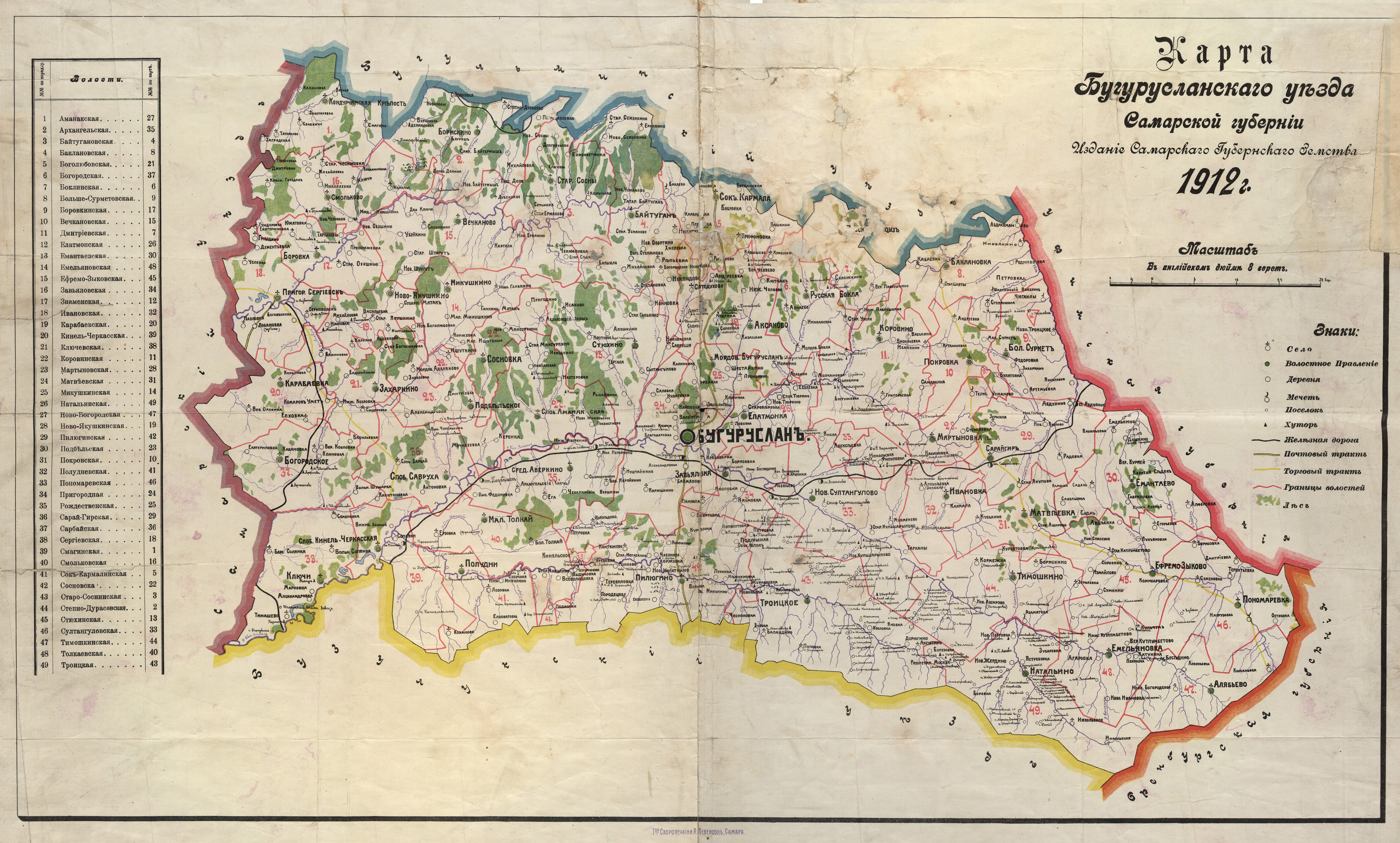
1912 map of Buguruslansky Uyezd

Buguruslansky Uyezd (Бугурусланский уезд) was one of the subdivisions of the Samara Governorate of the Russian Empire. It was situated in the northeastern part of the governorate. Its administrative centre was Buguruslan.

== Demographics ==
At the time of the Russian Empire Census of 1897, Buguruslansky Uyezd had a population of 405,994. Of these, 57.8% spoke Russian, 19.8% Mordvin, 8.6% Chuvash, 8.1% Tatar, 2.6% Ukrainian, 2.3% Bashkir and 0.7% Turkish as their native language.
