= Tajikistani Ground Forces =

Tajik Ground Forces
- Нерӯҳои заминии Тоҷикистон
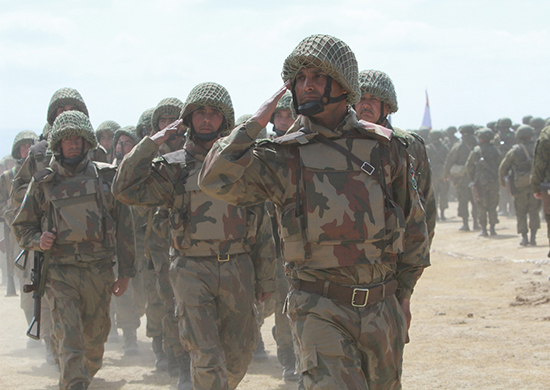
- Founded: 23 June 1993; 33 years ago
- Country: Tajikistan
- Type: Army
- Size: 9,000
- Part of: Armed Forces of Tajikistan
- Garrison/HQ: Dushanbe
- Colors: Green
- Anniversaries: Armed Forces Day
- Engagements: Civil war in Tajikistan; Insurgency in Gorno-Badakhshan (2010–2015); 2021 Kyrgyzstan–Tajikistan conflict; 2022 Kazakh unrest; 2022 Kyrgyzstan–Tajikistan clashes

Commanders
- Commander of the Tajik Ground Forces: Lieutenant General Rahmonali Safaralizoda

Insignia
- Identification symbol: TJ/TJK

The Tajik Ground Forces (Tajik: Нерӯҳои заминии Тоҷикистон, romanized: Nerŭhoi zaminii Tojikiston), known officially as the Ground Forces of the Ministry of Defense of Tajikistan are the land forces of the Armed Forces of Tajikistan. Formed during the Tajikistani Civil War, it makes up about 70 percent of the country's Armed Forces.

== History ==
Tajikistan is the only former Soviet republic that did not form its armed forces from old Soviet Army units. Instead, the Russian Defense Ministry took direct command of the Soviet units there, forcing the Tajik government to raise an army from scratch. The government began assembling the armed forces in February 1993. That summer, on 23 June, the ground forces were officially created.

It was originally established by the Ministry of Defense as the Armed Forces Department, and its first units were formed early in the year from skilled teams loyal to the Popular Front of Tajikistan. The personnel of the entire army saw the deployment of the following military units of that time: 13483, 07017, and 23441. By the mid 1990s, the ground forces numbered to around 3,000, with the majority of the officer corps being Russian, mostly veterans of the war in Afghanistan.

As of 1997, the ground forces had two motorized rifle brigades (one of them is a training brigade), a special operations brigade and detachment, as well as units and sub units that provide operational, technical and logistic support. The army benefited from several United Tajik Opposition units that were experienced from fighting government forces during the civil war, but as of 2006, were poorly maintained and funded. At that time the army had 44 main battle tanks, 34 armored infantry fighting vehicles, 29 armored personnel carriers, 12 pieces of towed artillery, 10 multiple rocket launchers, 9 mortars, and 20 surface-to-air missiles. The ground forces in 2007 had two motorized rifle brigades, one mountain brigade, one artillery brigade, one airborne assault brigade, one airborne assault detachment, and one surface-to-air missile regiment.

In the wake of the withdrawal of United States troops from Afghanistan, 20,000 reserve servicemen of the Ground Forces were sent to the border between Tajikistan and Afghanistan.

On October 28, 2021, China announced that it will finance the construction of a new base for Tajik commandos with another base near the Wakhan Corridor for Chinese troops.

== Training ==
It is frequently trained by personnel from Russia, China, France, India, and the United States. American trainers have worked on setting up a non-commissioned officer corps within the army to train enlisted personnel. Currently, more than 500 of servicemen are trained in Russia, and up to 1,000 junior specialists are trained annually at the Russian 201st Military Base.

== Structure ==
The Ground forces make up 70 percent of the Tajik National Army. It consists mainly of infantry, tank and artillery units. Many units are former militias, including several that fought the government during the Tajik civil war as part of the United Tajik Opposition. The following units are part of the Ground Forces:

- 1st Motorized Rifle Brigade (Bokhtar)
- 3rd Motorized Rifle Brigade (Khujand)
- 14th Guards Motor Rifle Regiment
- 27th Separate Anti-Tank Division
- 12th Artillery Brigade (Dushanbe)
- 7834th Separate Reconnaissance Battalion (Dushanbe)
- 39th Separate Reactive Battalion (Khujand)
- 75th Separate Medical Battalion
- 56th Separate Company for Chemical and Biological Protection
- 25th Separate Communications Battalion

== Equipment ==
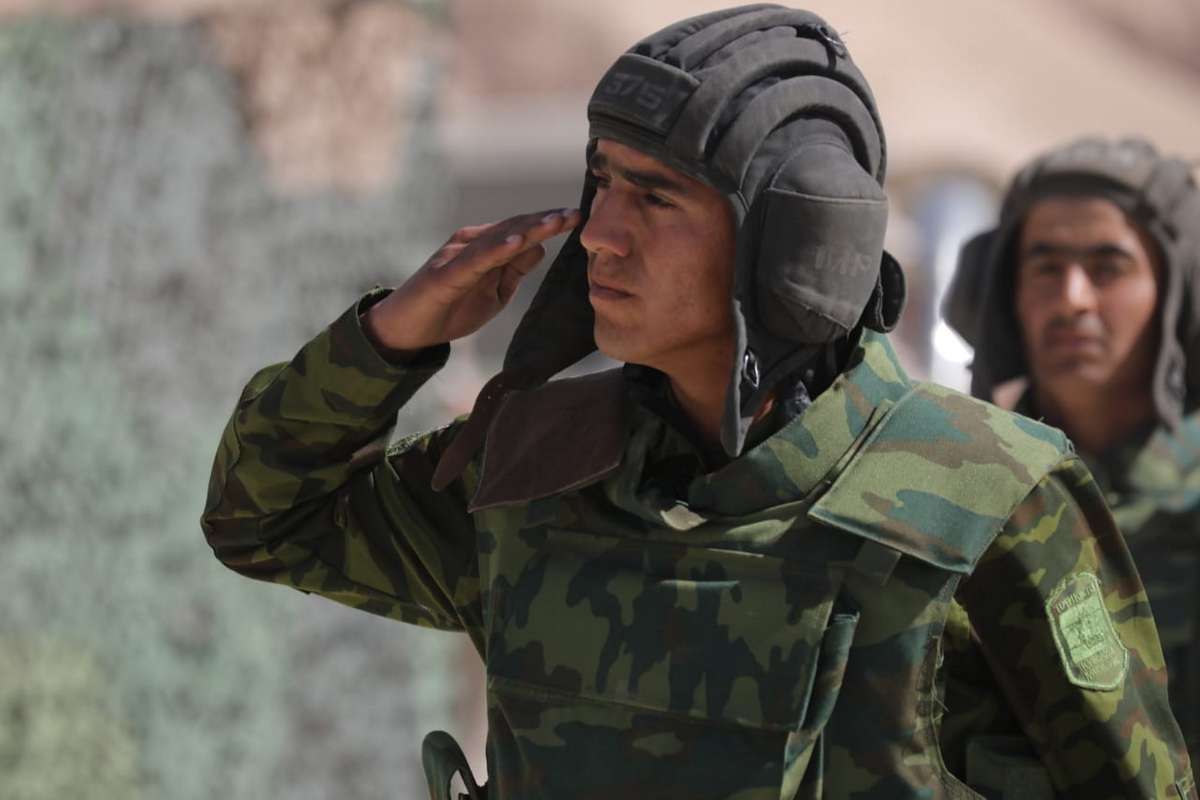
A Tajik army tanker.

Name	Origin	Type	In service	Notes
Main battle tanks
T-72	USSR	Main battle tank	28	
T-62	USSR	Main battle tank	7	
Armoured fighting vehicles
BTR-60	USSR	Amphibious armoured personnel carrier	1	
BTR-70	USSR	Amphibious armoured personnel carrier	2	
BTR-80	USSR	Amphibious armoured personnel carrier	20	
BMP-1	USSR	Infantry fighting vehicle	8	
BMP-2	USSR	Infantry fighting vehicle	15	
BRDM-2	USSR	Scout car	21	9 donate in 2019 and 12 BRDM-2M in 2021 by Russia.
Artillery
D-30 122mm howitzer	USSR		10	
Multiple rocket launchers
BM-21 Grad	USSR		3	
TOS-1	USSR		Unknown	
Mortars
PM-38 120mm	USSR		N/A	
Surface to air missiles
S-75 Dvina; S-125 Neva/Pechora; 9K32 Strela-2	USSR		Unknown	
Light equipment
Makarov PM	USSR		N/A	
TT-33	USSR		N/A	
AK-47	USSR		N/A	
AKM	USSR		N/A	
AK-74	USSR		N/A	
Type 56	China		N/A	
Type 81	China		N/A	
RPK	USSR		N/A	
PKM	USSR		N/A	
NSV	USSR		N/A	
DShK	USSR		N/A	
Dragunov SVD	USSR		N/A	
RPG-7	USSR		N/A	
RPG-18	USSR		N/A	
SPG-9	USSR		N/A	
