= Rahmonali Safaralizoda =

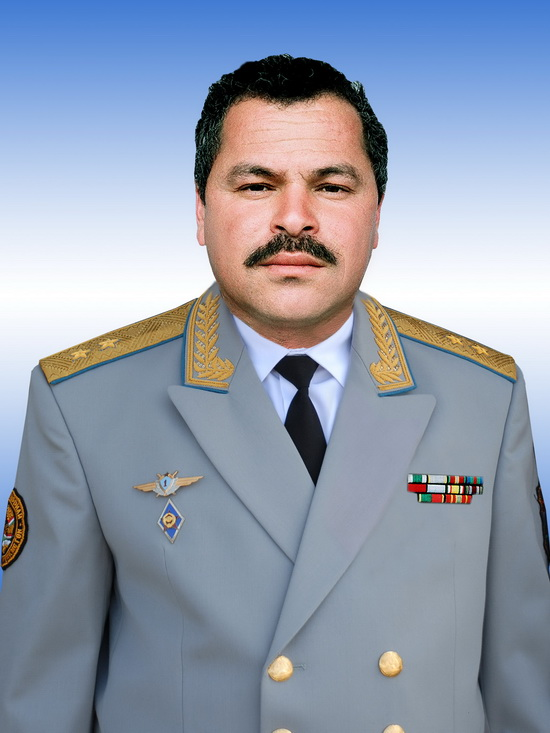
Safaralizoda in full dress uniform.

Lieutenant General Rahmonali Davlat Safaralizoda (Tajik: Раҳмонали Давлат Сафарализода) is a Tajik leader and current Commander of the Tajik Air Force.

He was born in the Khatlon Region on 6 April 1969 in a family of a workers. In August 1986, he enrolled in the Gorky Military Air Defense School of the Soviet Air Defence Forces, where he graduated in August 1990. After the fall of the Soviet Union, he joined the Tajik National Army. In 1993, he served in the local Commissariat for his native Vose' District. The following year, he became an officer of the Air Defense Department of the Ministry of Defense. In August 1994, he enrolled in the Zhukov Air and Space Defence Academy in Tver. From August 1997 to March 2001, he was the Chief of Staff of the Air Defense Forces. From March 2001 to December 2005, he served as Commander of the Air Defense and has since December 2005 been the commander of the united branch. In February 2005 he was awarded the rank of Major General. In April 2021, he chaired a regular meeting of the Air Defense Coordination Committee under the Council of Defense Ministers of the CIS.

== Family ==
He was married to Salima Dzhalinovna Sharipova (born in 1969). He had five children (2 sons and 3 daughters):

- Firuz (born in 1992)
- Beiruz (born in 2003)
- Rukhshuna (born 1995)
- Zarina (born in 1997)
- Ibigul (born in 2001)

== Awards ==
- Order of Courage
- Order of Glory
- 3 other medals
