= Nikolayevsky Uyezd (Samara Governorate) =

Nikolayevsky Uyezd (russian: Николаевский уезд) was one of the subdivisions of the Samara Governorate of the Russian Empire. It was situated in the central part of the governorate. Its administrative centre was Nikolayevsk (Pugachyov).

== Demographics ==
At the time of the Russian Empire Census of 1897, Nikolayevsky Uyezd had a population of 494,736. Of these, 76.7% spoke Russian, 12.6% German, 4.3% Mordvin, 3.8% Ukrainian, 1.5% Bashkir, 0.7% Tatar, 0.3% Turkmen and 0.1% Kazakh as their native language.
