= Samara Governorate =

1850–1928 unit of Russia

Coordinates: 53.1833°N 50.1167°E

Samara Governorate Самарская губерния
- Governorate of the Russian Empire
- 1850–1928
- Coat of arms

- Location within the Russian Empire
- Capital: Samara
- Population
  - 1897: 2,751,336
- History
  - Established: 1850
  - Disestablished: 14 May 1928

Samara Governorate (Russian: Самарская губерния, romanized: Samarskaya guberniya) was an administrative-territorial unit (guberniya) of the Russian Empire and the Russian SFSR, located in the Volga Region. It existed from 1850 to 1928; its capital was in Samara.

== Samara Governate under the Russian Empire ==
=== Administrative divisions ===
From its foundation until 1918 the governorate was divided into seven uyezds (counties). These were:

Map of the administrative divisions of the governorate, to 1918

No.	Uezd	County town	Coat of Arms of the county town	Area, Square miles	Population (1897)
1	Bugulminsky	Bugulma (7 581 pop.)		10 803,1	299 884
2	Buguruslansky	Buguruslan (12 109 pop.)		17 068,7	405 994
3	Buzuluksky	Buzuluk (14 362 pop.)		22 427,0	492 952
4	Nikolayevsky	Nikolaevsk (12 504 pop.)		28 196,9	494 736
5	Novouzensky	Novouzensk (13 261 pop.)	альт=	34 585,9	417 376
6	Samarsky	Samara (89 999 pop.)		13 155,4	357 018
7	Stavropolsky	Stavropol (5 969 pop.)		10 476,5	283 376
