= Commandant's Regiment =

Military unit in Tajikistan

- Полки комендантӣ вазорати мудофиаи
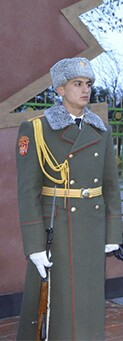
- A member of the company in his winter uniform.
- Active: 1993
- Country: Tajikistan
- Branch: Tajik Armed Forces
- Type: Headquarters Unit
- Part of: Ministry of Defense
- Garrison/HQ: Dushanbe

The Commandant Regiment of the Ministry of Defense (Tajik: Полки комендантӣ вазорати мудофиаи), also known as the Military Commandant’s Office of the Dushanbe Garrison, is an administration unit of the Military Police under the Ministry of Defence in the Tajik capital of Dushanbe. It is the Tajik equivalent to the Military Commandant of Moscow in the Russian Army. It as established in 1993 on the basis of the Military Commandant's Office of Dushanbe in the Soviet Army. It supervises all work regarding to military activities in the federal capital city, and is the lead organizer of all national ceremonial activities within the capital's vicinity and its metropolitan region involving the Armed Forces as a whole.

== Role and activities ==
This regiment is mostly staffed by officers with higher education. The commandant's office is the chief organizer of the annual military celebrations of Armed Forces Day, Victory Day (9 May), and Independence Day.

The regiment is the unit that controls two of the main ceremonial units of the Armed Forces of the Republic of Tajikistan Through the Honour Guard Company of the Ministry of Defense (Tajik: Ротаи Каровули Фахри вазорати мудофиаи), which is part of the regiment, it undertakes public duties in the national capital. The company is a purely representative unit made up of members of branches of the armed forces (specifically the Tajik Ground Forces, Tajik Mobile Forces, Tajik Air Force, Presidential National Guard) and serves under the command of the Commandant Regiment. The time frame for drafting into the unit is 3 to 6 months. Its missions include providing honours for foreign dignitaries and government officials at the Kohi Millat. The company has taken part in many international ceremonies and parades including in a parade on Tiananmen Square in honour of V-J Day in 2015 and a military parade on Red Square in 2020.

Thought the, Military Brass Band of the Ministry of Defense, which is a directly reporting unit of the Defence Ministry, the regiment provides musical support in the annual Victory Day, Independence Day and Armed Forces Day parades, held in May, September and February respectively.

== List of Commandants of Dushanbe ==
The following have served as military commandants:

- Major General Abdulnazar Abdulasanov (1993-1997)
- Colonel Dzhunaydullo Umarov (circa 2010)
- Colonel Ilkhom Maksumov (circa 2015)

== See also ==
- Commandant's Office of the Moscow Kremlin
- Military District of Washington
- London District (British Army)
- Military governor of Paris
