= Tajikistan Independence Day Military Parade =

Tajikistan Independence Day Military Parade Парад в честь Дня независимости Паради низомӣ Рӯзи Истиқлолияти давлатии Тоҷикистон
- Genre: Military parades
- Date: September 9
- Frequency: Quinquennial
- Venue: Dousti Square
- Location: Dushanbe
- Country: Tajikistan
- Previous event: 2026
- Next event: 2031

The Tajikistan Independence Day Military Parade is the main event of the Independence Day of Tajikistan. This parade is held every 5 years in Dushanbe on September 9. The participants in the parade are from agencies of the Armed Forces of the Republic of Tajikistan. The parade route is made up of Rudaki Avenue, Dousti Square and Hofizi Sherozi Avenue.

== Summary of the parade ==
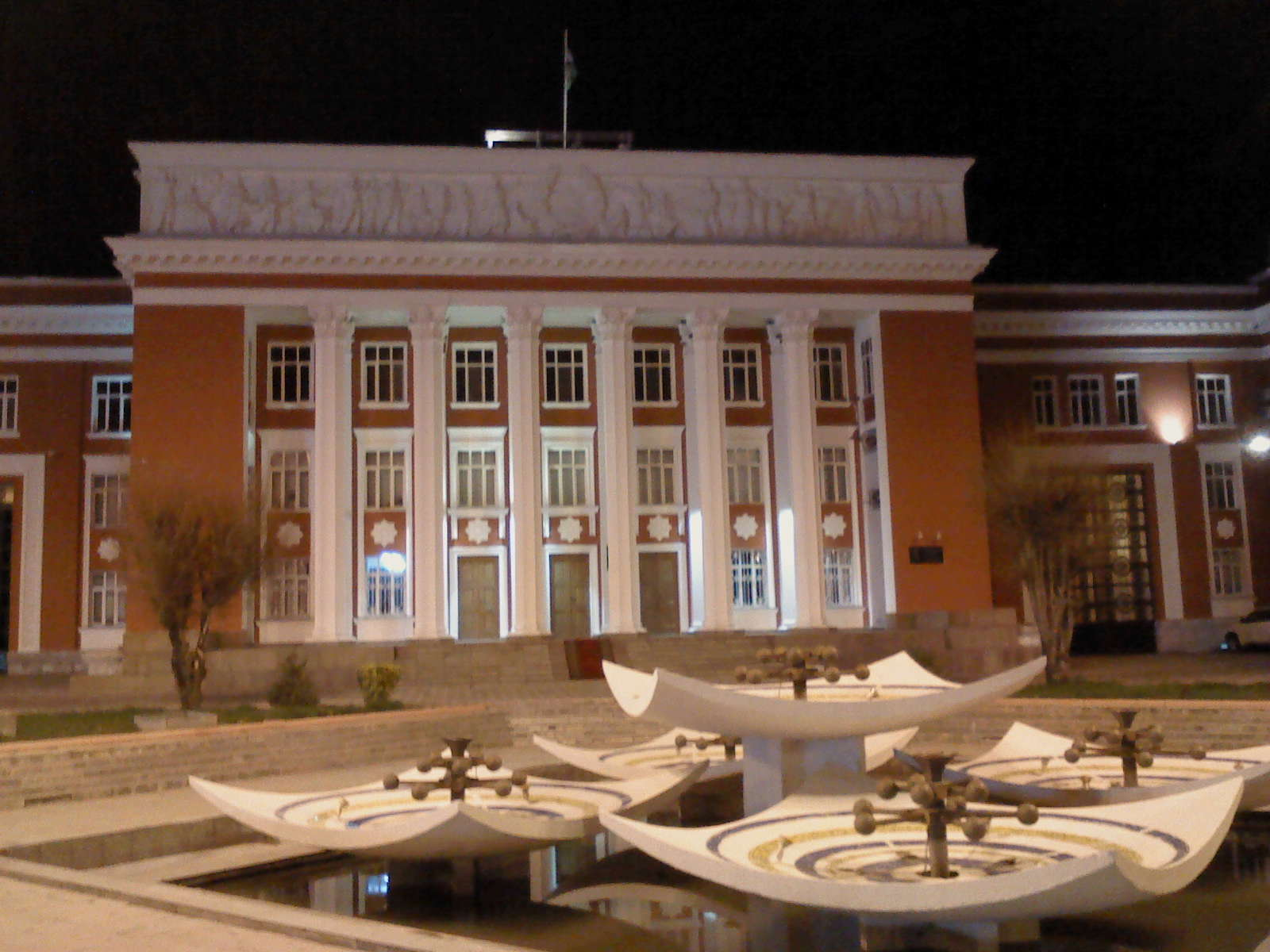
The parade takes place on Dousti Square, with the participating troops being lined up in front of the Parliament building (seen here).

=== Arrival Honors and Parade Inspection ===
At the sound of the Presidential Fanfare Navoi Iftikhor (Melody of Pride), the President of Tajikistan (in their capacity as commander-in-chief), followed by the Prime Minister of Tajikistan, the Mayor of Dushanbe, the Chief of the General Staff, the Minister of Internal Affairs, and the commanders of the different branches of the armed forces arrive on the central grandstand in front of the Ismoil Somoni Monument on Dousti Square. The president is then introduced by the master of ceremonies of the parade:

Please welcome, the Founder of Peace and National Unity, Leader of the Nation, President of the Republic of Tajikistan, Supreme Commander in Chief of the Armed Forces, the esteemed, (states president's name, currently is Emomali Rahmon)

The parade then prepares for its inspection by the Minister of Defense. As the minister approaches the ceremonial commander of the parade (usually the Dushanbe Garrison Commander), the massed bands play an inspection march. The parade commander then, salutes him and says "Comrade Minister of Defense of the Republic of Tajikistan, the troops of the Dushanbe Garrison, in honor of the anniversary of the independence of the Republic of Tajikistan are ready for inspection!". The minister will then inspect the troops and congratulate them on the holiday in the following manner:

Minister: Hello Comrades of the (states name of unit/formation/academy)
Formation: Greetings Comrade Minister of Defence!
Minister: Congratulations on the occasion of the anniversary of the independence of the Republic of Tajikistan!

After the inspection finishes, the minister reports to the president on the status of the parade. While the minister makes their way to the grandstand, all of the participating troops sound a threefold Hurray as the minister passes by.

=== Holiday Address and Parade Orders ===
After the president greets the participants of the parade, the National anthem of Tajikistan (Surudi Milli) is then played. The president then delivers a speech and congratulates the troops on the holiday. Following a salute to their commander in chief and threefold Oorah by the armed forces, the commander of the parade then gives the order for the Dushanbe Garrison to commence the march past in the following manner:

Parade... attention! Prepare for the solemn march past!
Form battalions! Distance by a single lineman! First battalion will remain in the right, remainder... left.. turn!
Slope.. arms!
By the left!
Quick...March!

=== Parade Proper ===
After the parade commander orders the start of the parade, the troops of the Dushanbe Garrison march past the central tribune. After all the troops have paraded, the guard of honor drill team and the massed bands of the Dushanbe Garrison deliver a performance. Finally, the massed bands leave the square and the President of Tajikistan greets the commanders of the parade formations.

== List of parades ==
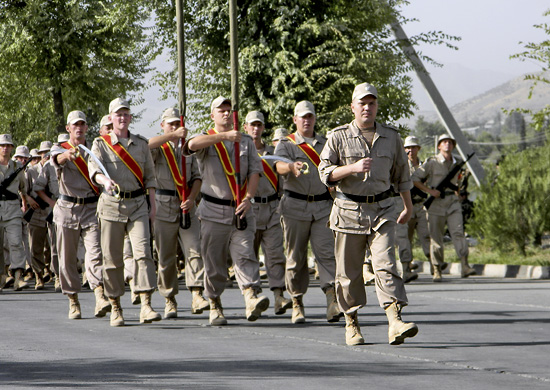
Russian soldiers at the general rehearsal of the parade.

Year	Anniversary	Parade inspector	Parade commander	Notes
2001	10th anniversary	Colonel General Sherali Khayrulloyev		The celebrations were attended by the Iranian Foreign Minister Kamal Kharazi and Mayor of Moscow Yury Luzhkov.
2006	15th anniversary	Colonel General Sherali Khayrulloyev	Major General Latif Fayziyev	11,000 servicemen from the Dushanbe Garrison participated in the parade.
2011	20th anniversary	Colonel General Sherali Khayrulloyev	Major General Latif Fayziyev	It involved 10,000 troops from the Tajik National Army. Military parades were also held in 4 major Tajik cities as well. Contingents from Russia (led by Colonel Pyumshin), Afghanistan, France, Iran and India also took part in the parade. Russian aircraft from the Saratov Oblast also took part in the proceedings. On August 25, the square was closed at night for traffic in connection with the parade rehearsal.
2016	25th anniversary	Lieutenant General Sherali Mirzo	Major General Latif Fayziyev	16,000 troops from the armed forces were on parade that day. Lieutenant General Mirzo inspected the parade along Rudaki Avenue and greeted them on the anniversary. A procession that took place in the morning amounted to 52,000 students of higher educational schools, children, and employees of public institutions that marched from Rudaki Avenue up to Ismoili Somoni Street. Festive celebrations dedicated to the anniversary also took place on Somoni Avenue in Khujand.
2021	30th anniversary	Colonel General Sherali Mirzo	Lieutenant General Latif Fayziyev	The parade, preparations of which began in mid-August, took place on 7 September instead of 9 September. For the first time, the trooping and posting of the Flag of Tajikistan by an honor guard was held. 30,000 soldiers, half of whom were reservists, took part in the parade, making it the largest in history. All over the country, 162,000 military personnel took part in parades in cities such as Khujand, Khatlon, Khorugh and Navruzgokh. The national celebrations were so large that the National Army did not send troops to the "Border-2021" exercises of the CSTO in Kyrgyzstan.
2023	32nd anniversary and 30th anniversary of the armed forces	Colonel General Sherali Mirzo	Lieutenant General Latif Fayziyev	The parade took place on the newly created Istiklol (Independence) Square in Dushanbe.
2026	35th anniversary	Colonel General Emomali Sobirzoda	Major General Husein Shokirzoda	

== Full order of the parade ==
=== Massed Bands of the Dushanbe Garrison ===
- Military Brass Band of the Ministry of Defense of the Republic of Tajikistan
- Corp of Drums of the Mastibek Tashmukhamedov Military Lyceum of the Ministry of Defense of Tajikistan

=== Ground Column ===
- Cadets of the Mastibek Tashmukhamedov Military Lyceum of the Ministry of Defense of Tajikistan
- Armed Forces Veterans
- National Guard Units
- Female Personnel
- Ground Forces
- Air and Air Defense Forces
- Tajik Internal Troops
- Police Units
- Personnel of the Ministry of Justice
- Personnel of the Committee of Emergency Situations and Civil Defense of Tajikistan
- Special Forces of the State Committee for National Security
- Tajik Border Troops
- Cadets of the Military Institute of the Ministry of Defense of Tajikistan
- Rapid Reaction Force personnel
- Dog Trainers
- Mounted Cavalry
- Honor Guard Company of the Ministry of Defense of Tajikistan

=== Foreign columns (2011) ===
Contingent	Country/Organization
Russian 201st Military Base	Russia
Cadets of the National Military Academy of Afghanistan and Troops of the Afghan National Army Commando Corps	Afghanistan
Troops of the Operational Transport Group of the French Air Force	France
Troops of the Iranian Air Force	Iran
Indian Troops from Farkhor Air Base	India

== Military music played during the parade ==
- Navoi Iftixor (Song of Pride)
- Slow March of the Tajik Army
- March of the Preobrazhensky Regiment
- Jubilee Slow March "25 Years of the Red Army"
- Farewell of Slavianka

== Broadcast ==
The parade is broadcast on the following television channels:

- Televidenye Tajikistana
- 1TV First Channel
- TV Varzish

== See also ==
- Independence Day (Tajikistan)
- Armed Forces Day (Tajikistan)
- Victory Day Parades

== External links and sources ==
- 2001 Dushanbe Independence Day Parade
- 2011 Dushanbe Independence Day Parade
- 2016 Dushanbe Independence Day Parade
- В Душанбе показали огромный флаг и форму от Юдашкина
- 20th anniversary of Tajikistan's independence
