= Public holidays in Tajikistan =

This following is a list of public holidays in Tajikistan:

== Holidays ==
Date	English name	Local name	Remarks
January 1	New Year's Day	Соли нав	-
March 8	International Women's Day	Рӯзи байналмилалии занон	-
March 21-24	Nowruz	Наврӯз	Persian New Year
May 1	Labour Day	Рӯзи меҳнат	-
May 9	Victory Day	Рӯзи Ғалаба	
June 27	National Unity Day	Рӯзи Ваҳдати Миллии	
September 9	Independence Day	Рӯзи истиқлолияти Ҷумҳурии Тоҷикистон	
November 6	Constitution Day	Рӯзи Конститутсияи Ҷумҳурии Тоҷикистон	
Syawwal 1	Idi Ramazon	Иди Рамазон	Commemorates end of Ramadan
Dhu al-Hijjah 10	Idi Qurbon	Иди Қурбон	Commemorates the Sacrifice

=== Military/Paramilitary ===
- August 4 – Paratroopers' Day, celebrates Tajik Mobile Forces
- February 6 – Day of the Tajik Police, celebrates Tajik Internal Troops
- May 28 – Border Guards Day, celebrates Tajik Border Troops
- October 2 – National Guard Day, celebrates Presidential National Guard

== See also ==
- Culture of Tajikistan
