= Samarkand Higher Military Automobile Command School =

- Самарқанд олий ҳарбий автомобиль қўмондонлик-муҳандислик билим юрти
- Active: 23 September 1969; 56 years ago
- Country: USSR; Uzbekistan
- Branch: Soviet Army; Uzbek Ground Forces
- Type: military academy
- Part of: Ministry of Defense of Uzbekistan
- Garrison/HQ: Spitamenes Avenue, Samarkand

The Samarkand Higher Military Automobile Command School (Uzbek: Самарқанд олий ҳарбий автомобиль қўмондонлик-муҳандислик билим юрти; Russian: Самаркандское высшее военное автомобильное командное училище) is a military academy of the Armed Forces of the Republic of Uzbekistan and a former educational institution under the Soviet Defence Ministry.

== History ==
=== Soviet period ===
The school's history can be traced to the creation of the 2nd Kharkiv Armoured School, formed on 12 August 1941 in the Ukrainian SSR. In November 1941, the 2nd Kharkiv Armoured School was relocated from Kharkiv to the Uzbek SSR . In 1946, this school was renamed into the Samarkand Tank-Technical School. On 23 September 1969, by a decree of the Council of Ministers of the USSR, the Samarkand Higher Tank Command School was formed, with the task of which was to train commanders of tank platoons. It was officially opened on 20 November. It was headed by Major General Aleksey Cherevko, a veteran of the Red Army during World War II. By order of Soviet Minister of Defense Marshal Andrei Grechko on 23 May 1973, it was transformed into an automobile command school. The school was noted having been awarded the Red Banner by the Military Council of the Turkestan Military District. In 1979, the school was given the honorary title of Supreme Soviet of the Uzbek SSR.

=== In Independent Uzbekistan ===
In 1992, the Samarkand Higher Military Automobile Command School came under the jurisdiction of Uzbekistan, together with the Tashkent Higher All-Arms Command School and the Tashkent Higher Tank Command School. In connection with the policy of the authorities of the republic aimed at the complete training of officers for the armed forces by their own forces, on the basis of the military educational institutions inherited from the USSR, a multidisciplinary training scheme was implemented. On the basis of the Automobile School, which in 1993 changed its name to the Samarkand Higher Military Automobile Command-Engineering School, faculties were created to train other specialties including the position of commander of the automobile platoon. For multidisciplinary training at schools, the following departments and faculties were created in the following years:

- 1996 - Department of Educational Work and Military Psychology
- 1999 - Department of Missile and Artillery Weapons
- 2004 - Department of Engineering Troops and Troops of the RChBZ
- 2004 - Faculty of Logistics Support (including the Department of Food and Clothing Support and the Department of Fuel Supply)

Since 1997, the faculties of school, had carried out training in the following 5 military specialties:

- Commander of a Car Platoon
- Engineer Platoon Commander
- Deputy Company Commander for the Operation and Repair of Motor Vehicles
- Logistics Specialists
- Cultural Leisure Officers

The term of study is carried out on a 4-year cycle.

== Notable graduates ==
- Lieutenant Colonel Bakhodir Redjapov, Deputy Commander of the North-West Military District (class of 2001)
- Alexander Gaskov, recipient of the Order of the Red Banner for his service in Afghanistan (class of 1977)
- Saparkhan Chukeitov, member of the faculty of the Military Department of International Information Technology University (class of 1986)
- Latif Fayziyev, former commander of the Tajik Mobile Forces
