= Sherali Mirzo =

Minister of Defence of Tajikistan

- Шералӣ Мирзо
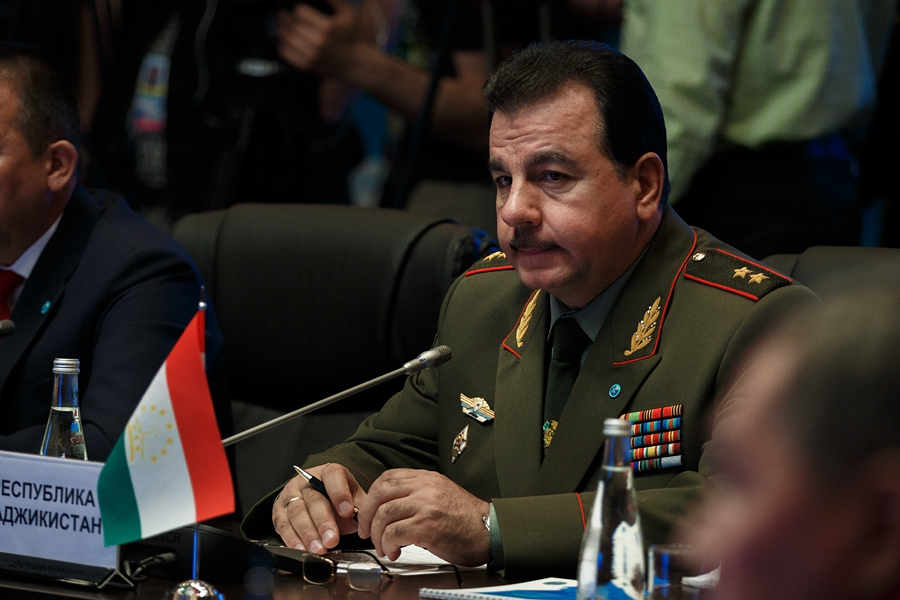
- Mirzo in 2015

Minister of Defense
- In office 20 November 2013 – 23 January 2025
- President: Emomali Rahmon
- Preceded by: Sherali Khayrulloyev
- Succeeded by: Emomali Sobirzoda

Personal details
- Born: Sheralishoh Fayzalievich Mirzoev; 24 May 1967 (age 59) Moskovskiy District, Khatlon Region, Tajik SSR, USSR

Military service
- Allegiance: USSR; Tajikistan
- Branch: Armed Forces of Tajikistan
- Service years: 1994–2025
- Rank: Colonel General
- Conflict: Tajikistani Civil War

Colonel General Sherali Mirzo (Note: Born with patronymic as Sheralishoh Fayzalievich Mirzoev (Tajik: Шералишоҳ Файзалиевич Мирзоев) as a Russified version of the full former Soviet name.) (Tajik: Шералӣ Мирзо) is a Tajik Colonel General who served as the Minister of Defence from 20 November 2013 to 23 January 2025, succeeding Sherali Khayrulloyev and preceding Emomali Sobirzoda.

== Biography ==
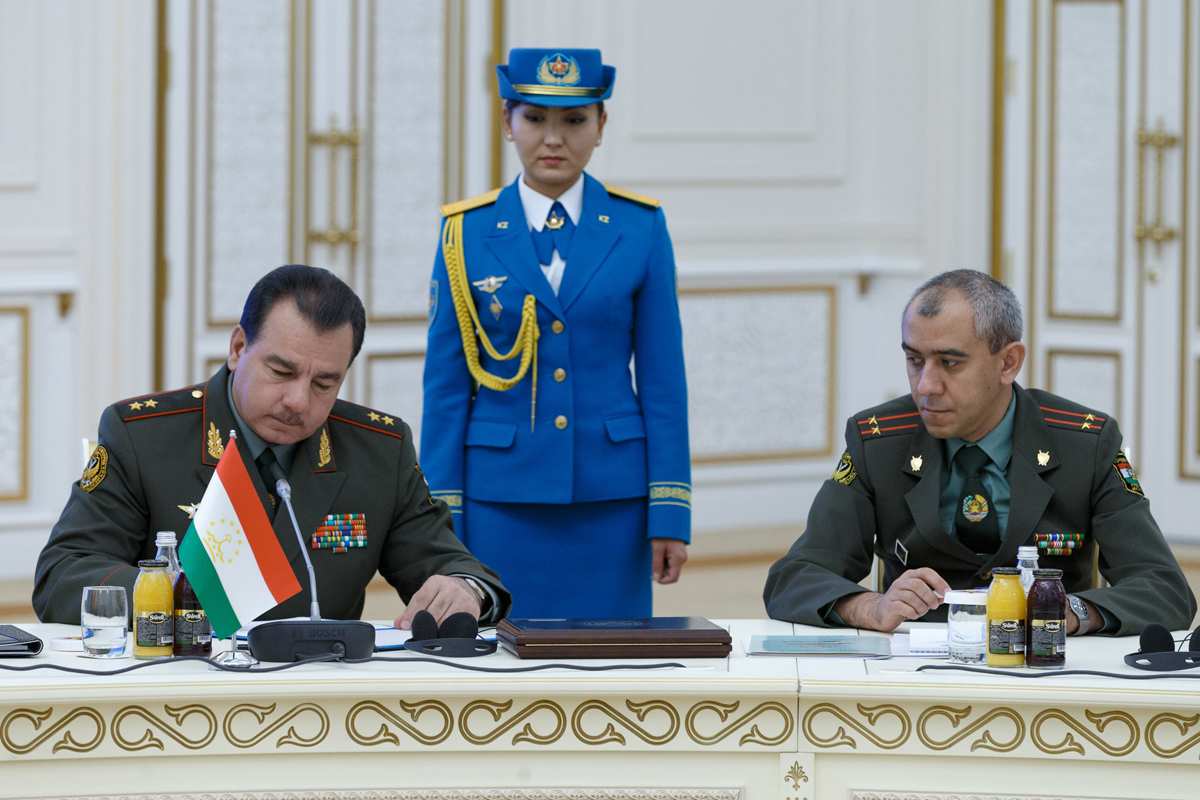
Mirzo in Astana.

=== Early life and military career ===
Mirzo was born in 1967 in the Moskovskiy District (present-day Hamadoni) in the Khatlon Region in the Tajik Soviet Socialist Republic. He graduated from the Perm Higher Military Command Academy and joined the armed forces after independence in 1994. During the Tajik civil war, he commanded the military forces of the Vose' District. In 1994-1995 he was a senior officer of the military training department of the Ministry of Defense and from 1997-2002, he was the commander of the 7th Separate Motor Rifle Battalion. He was appointed to this position on 13 August of that year to replace Colonel Mahmud Khudoiberdiyev, holding the rank of a Lieutenant colonel at the time. He spent four years studying at the Military Academy of the General Staff of the Armed Forces of Russia.

=== Appointment to high positions ===
From 2005–2006, he served as Tajikistan’s Deputy Minister of Defence before being moving to the State Committee for National Security (SCNS) which succeeded the KGB of the Tajik SSR. It was the SCNS where he served as the commander of the Tajik Border Troops, as well as First Deputy SCNS Chairman. On 3 October 2013 by order of a presidential decree he was appointed Minister of Defense by President Emomali Rahmon. He succeeded Sherali Khayrulloyev who resigned as Minister of Defence due to "health reasons".

On 23 January 2025, President Rahmon appointed Emomali Sobirzoda as the new minister of defense and appointed Mirzo head of the State Secret Protection Department under the Government of Tajikistan.

== Actions as Minister of Defence ==
In November 2018, it was revealed that Mirzo had built a health centre at his own expense in the Baljuvon District. Under his leadership, the first military exercises with Uzbekistan took place at the Chorukhdairon Military Training Ground in the Sughd Region. The Armed Forces Command Center was also launched under his tenure. In 2021, he visited Tehran, agreeing with General Mohammad Bagheri to establish a joint defensive and military committee between the National Army and the Islamic Republic of Iran Armed Forces.

In 2014, he accompanied President Rahmon in Sochi as part of a delegation to take part in the 2014 Winter Olympics opening ceremony. In 2016, a parade on Dousti Square that honored the 25th anniversary of independence was held, with Lieutenant General Mirzo inspecting the parade along Rudaki Avenue and congratulating participants on the anniversary.

== Awards ==
- Order of Zarintoj, 2nd class (2013)
- Order of Spitamen
- Jubilee Medal "70 Years of the Armed Forces of the USSR"
