= Military Brass Band of the Commandant Regiment of the Ministry of Defense of Tajikistan =

Specialized music unit in the Tajik National Army

- Оркестри комендатураҳои ҳарбии Вазорати мудофиаи Тоҷикистон
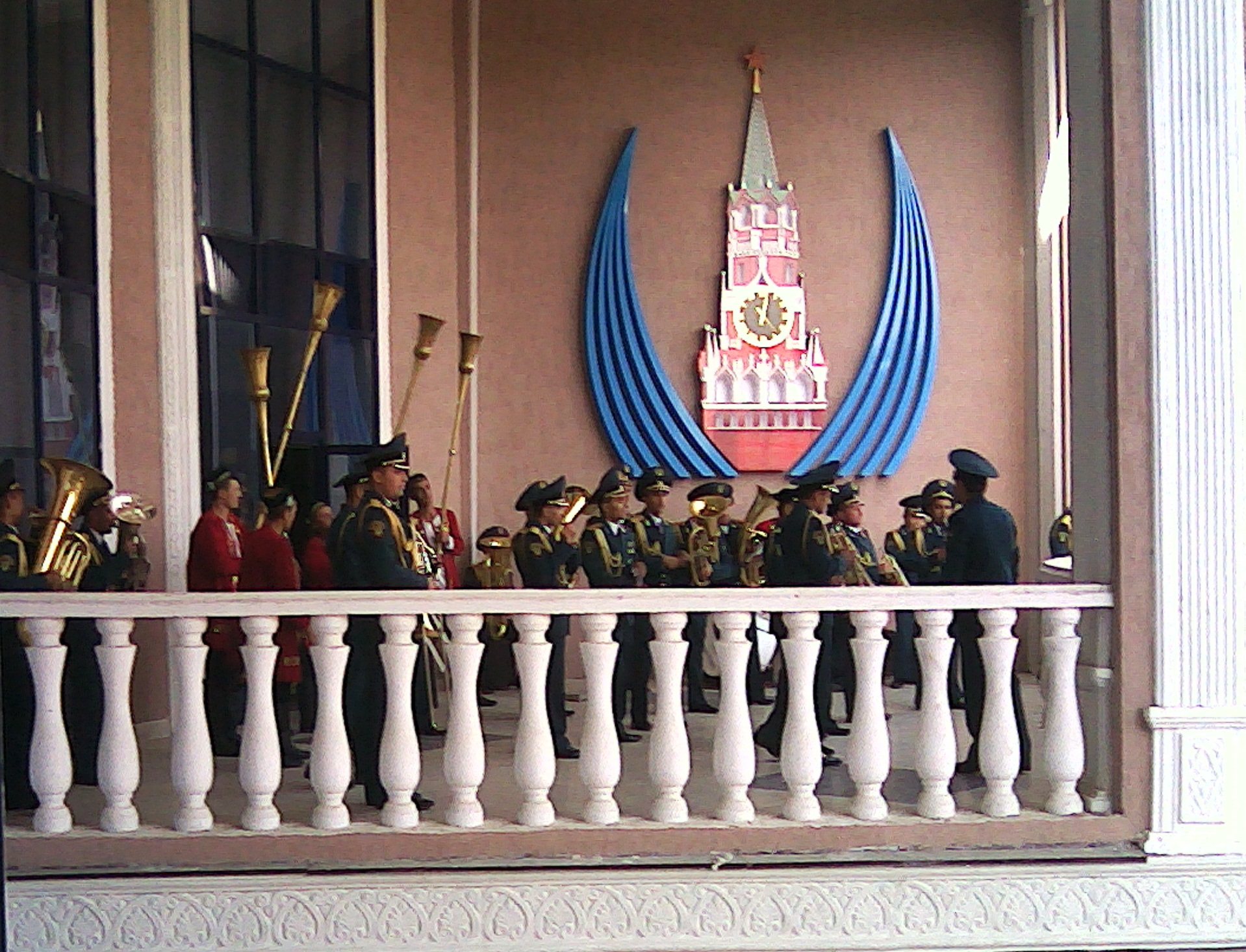
- Active: 26 August 1994; 32 years ago
- Country: Tajikistan
- Branch: Armed Forces of the Republic of Tajikistan
- Type: Military Band
- Size: 44 musicians
- Part of: Commandant's Regiment, Ministry of Defense
- Garrison/HQ: Dushanbe
- Anniversaries: August 26

Commanders
- Current commander: Ibodulla Nasrulloev
- Notable commanders: Captain Daler Sharipov; Major Murtazo Sharipov; Captain Moiddin Amirov

The Military Brass Band of the Commandant Regiment of the Ministry of Defense of Tajikistan (known simply as the Military Band of the Ministry of Defense of Tajikistan), is the official regimental military band of the commandant regiment of the Ministry of Defence of Tajikistan. Being subordinate to the Ministry of Defence, it is the seniormost military band in the Armed Forces of the Republic of Tajikistan.

The band performs a series of tasks that include providing entertainment in activities concerning the Tajik National Army, as well as in various state concerts and celebrations. It has performed during the quinquennial Independence Day and National Army Day parades in Dushanbe on September 9 and February 23 respectively since 1993, and has attended every military and state function at various locations, from the Kohi Millat to military tattoos in foreign countries. A notable ensemble in the brass band is a regiment is a karnaists group. Standard marches by the band include March of the Tajik Army and Farewell of Slavianka, Vatan, and Askaram man, askaram.

The Air Force, National Guard, and the Internal Troops also maintain military bands in the country. The bands of regional garrisons (the Band of the Dushanbe Garrison for example) also provide musical support to the armed forces and like the band, are part of the Commandant's Regiment.

== Origins ==
Tajik military bands follow the Russian and Persian precedent for military bands while adding traditional Central Asian instruments such as the Karnay (specifically the Muiuz kernei). Although many military bands in Tajikistan were formed from former Soviet military bands based in the Tajik SSR, they have for the most part been relocated to neighboring countries and to Russia. An example of this is the Band of the 201st Motor Rifle Division, which was for many years prior to independence the main military band in the country. The present day band was founded by order of the Tajik Cabinet on 26 August 1994. The repertoire of the band consists of the national anthems of foreign countries as well as military music. The trumpets of Mirzo Mansurov are used in the band.

== Structure ==
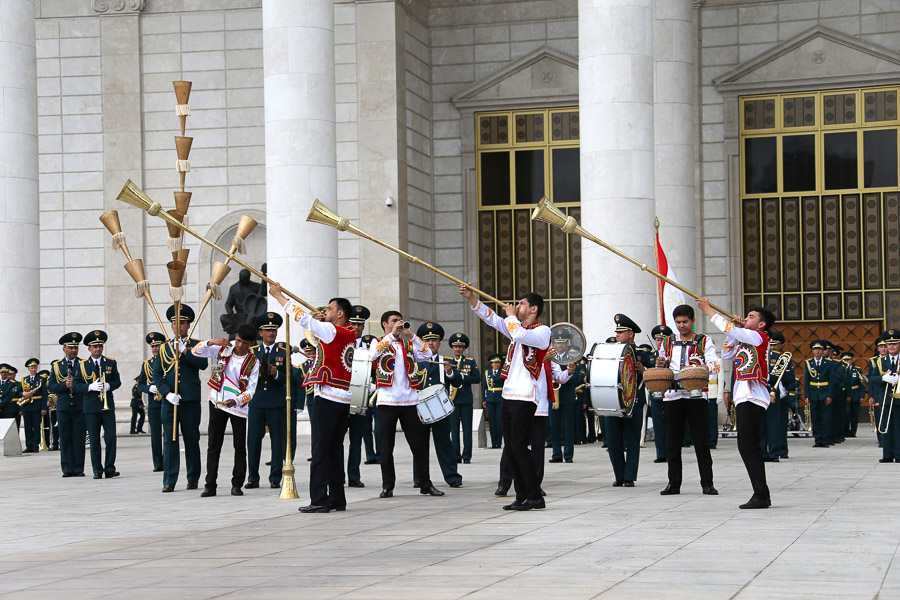
Members of the Military Band with Karnays.

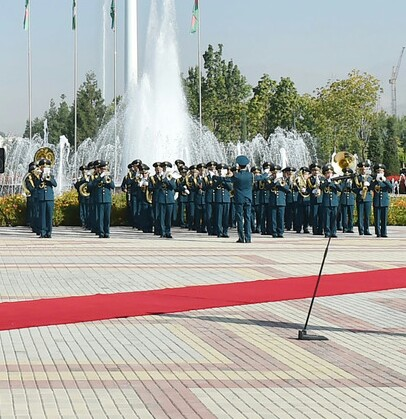
The band at the Palace of Nations.

- Marching Band
- Concert Band
- Fanfare Team
- Karnay Ensemble
- Wind Ensemble
- Big Band

Although officially part of the Tajik National Army, the band is a directly reporting unit of the Ministry of Defence, specifically its commandant's regiment.

== Activities ==
The band is more often than not, at a public event, usually participating in many military and civilian settings.

=== Scheduled ceremonies ===
- Welcoming Ceremonies: Held in the Palace of Nations in Dushanbe. The band plays the national anthem of Tajikistan and the guest. It works with the Honor Guard Company of the Ministry of Defense of Tajikistan.
- Inauguration Ceremonies: Held in honor of the inauguration of the President of Tajikistan.
- Parades: The band provides musical accompaniment in the annual Victory Day parade, as well as the Independence Day an Army Day parades.

=== Notable performances ===
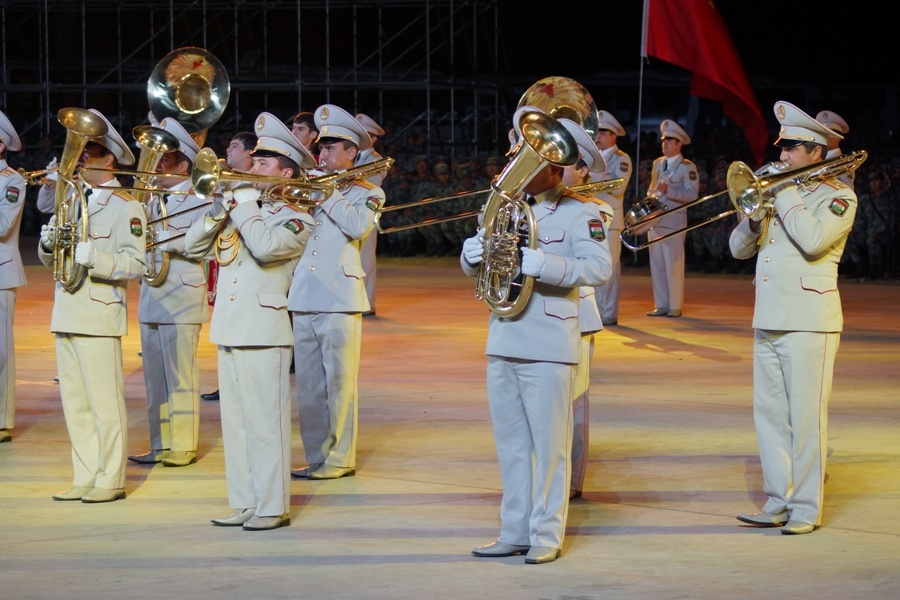
Trumpet of Peace international Festival of Brass Bands, 2014

- Spasskaya Tower Military Music Festival and Tattoo (2010)
- Trumpet of Peace international Festival of Brass Bands (2014)
- II Military Music Festival of the Armed Forces of the SCO member-states (2015)
- Pipes of Peace international Festival of Brass Bands (2015)
- Trumpet of Peace international Festival of Brass Bands (2016)
- Armed Forces Day Concert (2018)

== Gallery ==
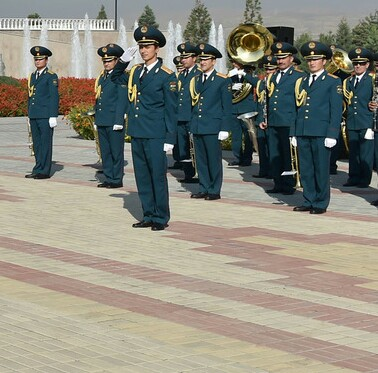
The band at the Kohi Millat.

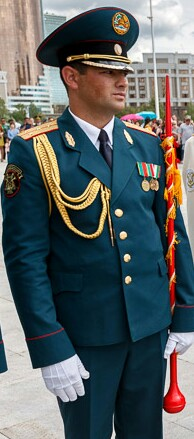
The band drum major

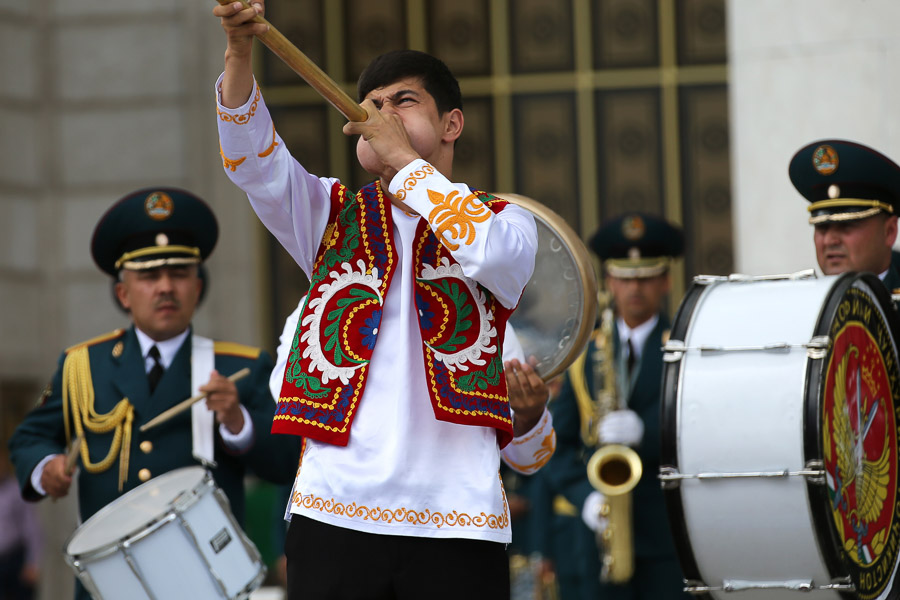
A lone karnaist

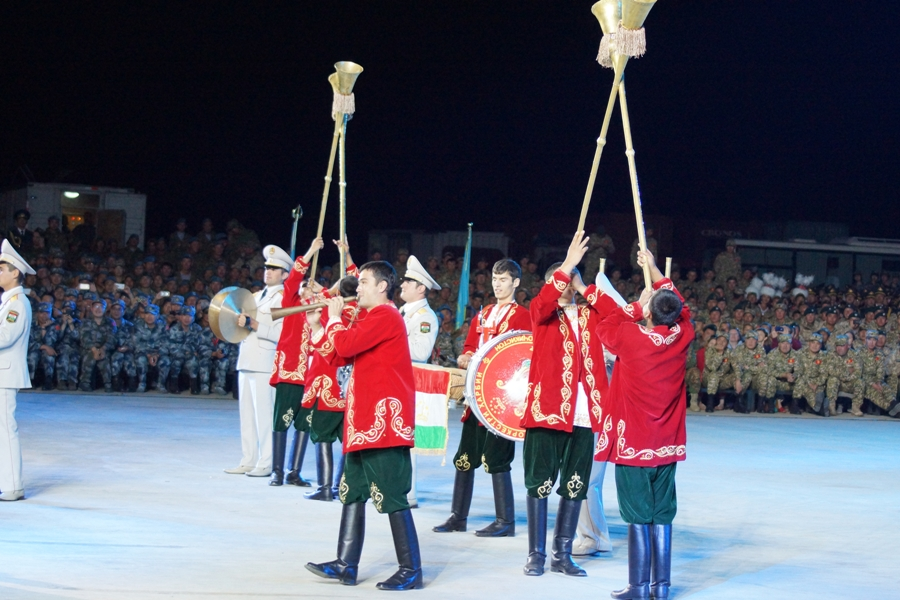
The Karnaists Ensemble in China.

== See also ==
- Military Band Service of the Armed Forces of Russia
- Band of the Ministry of Defense of the Republic of Uzbekistan
- Band of the General Staff of the Armed Forces of Kyrgyzstan
- Central Military Band of the People's Liberation Army of China
