= Armed Forces Day (Tajikistan) =

National holiday in Tajikistan

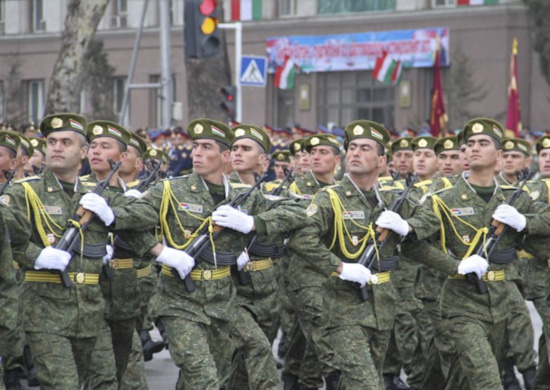
- Armed Forces Day in 2013
- Official name: Рӯзи Қувваҳои Мусаллаҳ; День Вооружённых сил
- Also called: Tajik National Army Day or Defender of the Fatherland Day
- Observed by: Tajikistan
- Celebrations: Military parades, ceremonies
- Date: February 23
- Next time: 23 February 2027
- Frequency: Annual
- Related to: Defender of the Fatherland Day

Armed Forces Day (Tajik: Рӯзи Қувваҳои Мусаллаҳ; Russian: День Вооружённых сил) also known as Tajik National Army Day (Tajik: Рӯзи Артиши Миллӣ Тоҷик) or Defender of the Fatherland Day (Tajik: Рӯзи Дорандаи Ватан) is a national holiday celebrated annually on 23 February, commemorating the founding of the Armed Forces of the Republic of Tajikistan. The event is marked by military parades, fireworks and ceremonies around of the country.

== History ==
The day has its roots with the Red Army Day in the Soviet Union. On February 23, 1992, President Emomali Rahmon signed a decree establishing the Armed Forces of Tajikistan. Also known as the Tajik National Army, it now consists of the Air and Air Defense Forces, the Ground Forces and Mobile Forces, all of which serve under the Ministry of Defence. The armed forces also includes the Presidential National Guard, the Border Guards Day and the Tajik Internal Troops under the Ministry of Internal Affairs (VKD). February 23 is also celebrated in Russia, Belarus, Kyrgyzstan, and partially recognized republics of South Ossetia and Transnistria as Defender of the Fatherland Day.

== Military events and notable celebrations ==
Celebrations of Tajik National Army Day are organized by the Ministry of Defence. On most years, the anniversary of the Tajik National Army is celebrated during events held in Victory Park, Dushanbe, where wreaths are laid. On jubilee years, the Tajik defence ministry will decide to hold a large military parade of the Dushanbe Garrison (similar to the Tajikistan Independence Day Military Parade) through the center of Dushanbe. Concerts of Tajik military bands will also take place in the city and throughout the country. With the holiday coinciding with Defender of the Fatherland Day, it is commonplace for personnel of the Russian 201st Military Base in Tajikistan to celebrate Armed Forces Day alongside their Tajik counterparts.

=== 1993 ===
The first military parade of Tajikistan took place in Dushanbe in honor of the founding of the Tajik National Army, which took place that same day. The parade was commanded by the country's first defence minister, Colonel Alexander Shishlyannikov, as well as Colonel Ramazon Radjabov (the Deputy Minister of Defense), an officer who often considered to be a potential successor to Shishlyannikov. Participants in the parade were attended an induction ceremony in the presence of President Rahmon Nabiyev on Ozodi Square prior to the start of the parade.

=== 2003 ===
It was dedicated to the 10th anniversary of the Tajik military. President Rahmon affirmed his commitment to the anti-terrorist coalition led by the United States.

=== 2008 ===
A jubilee medal was instituted in honor of the occasion of the 15th anniversary of the armed forces.

=== 2013 ===
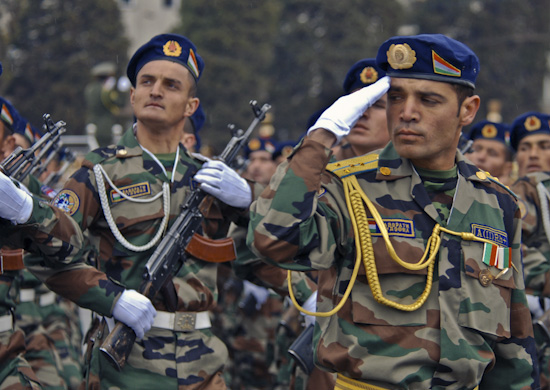

2013 celebrated the 20th anniversary of the armed forces. The celebrations and events took place with the participation of more than 10,000 troops of the armed forces. Tajik Defense Minister Sherali Khayrulloyev inspected the anniversary parade in the capital, which saw troops and personnel of the Anticorruption Agency and the State Committee for National Security take part in the parade for the first time. Women were also first time participants.

=== 2018 ===
It celebrated silver jubilee of the Tajik Armed Forces. A ceremony and a festive concert took place at the Kokhi Borbad State Complex in Dushanbe. Performers at the concert included the academic ensemble of the national army and the Military Brass Band of the Ministry of Defense. The Center for the Management of the Armed Forces (which would serve as the main military command center for the president) was opened on this day. The quinquennial parade was canceled by President Rahmon due to the government refusing to hold any major parades until 2021 on the occasion of the 30th anniversary of independence.

=== 2020 ===
The 2020 parade was held in honor of the 27th anniversary of the armed forces. Unlike most years, the parade was held at a National Guard base in Dushanbe.

=== 2023 ===
Events were held to mark the 30th anniversary of the armed forces.

== Other service holidays ==
- 26 May (Border Guards Day)
- 3 September (Day of the National Guard/Рӯзи Гвардияи миллии)

== See also ==
- Tajikistan Independence Day Military Parade
- Defender of the Fatherland Day (Kazakhstan)
- Defender of the Motherland Day
