= Latif Fayziyev =

Tajik army general (born 1957)

Latif Fayziyev Латиф Файзиев
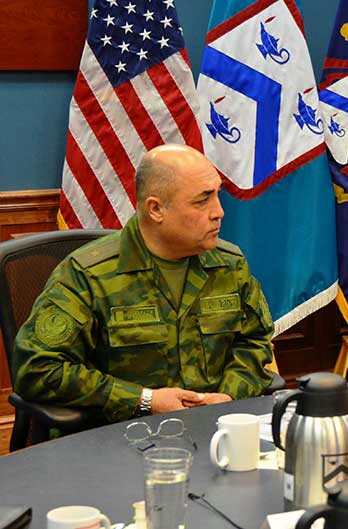
- Born: Latif Mirzoevich Fayziyev; 11 October 1957 (age 69); Varzob, Tajik SSR, Soviet Union
- Military career
- Allegiance: Soviet Union; Tajikistan
- Branch: Soviet Army; Tajik Mobile Forces
- Service years: 1978–
- Rank: Lieutenant General
- Commands: Tajik Mobile Forces (2006–2014)

Lieutenant General Latif Mirzoevich Fayziyev (Tajik: Латиф Мирзоевич Файзиев), also known by his persianized name Latifjon Mirzo Faizizoda, is a lieutenant general in the armed forces of Tajikistan. From 2006 to 2014, he was the chief of the Tajik Mobile Forces. He is currently a Ministry of Defense Advisor (MoDA) and commander of the Dushanbe Military Garrison.

== Career ==
After graduation in 1974, he worked in various repair shops in Samarkand. In 1979, he graduated from the Samarkand Higher Military Automobile Command School of the Soviet Army. Throughout the decade, he served in the Central Asian Military District and the limited contingent of the Soviet Army in Afghanistan. He also served as Deputy Chairman of the DOSAAF Committee in Leninabad beginning in the early 90s.

He served as Deputy Minister of Defence for logistics from 1997 to 2006. He was appointed to the post of Commander of Mobile Troops in 2006. During his tenure, he oversaw a drill with military units from Kyrgyzstan. He is also has since 2006 been head of the Dushanbe Military Garrison. In this position, he commonly leads military parades on Dousti Square in honor of Independence Day and Tajik National Army Day. He was promoted to the rank of Lieutenant general in February 2018.

He has been awarded the following: Medal "For Sustainable Military Cooperation" (1999), Medal "For Military Service" (1991).
