= Fayziyev =

Fayziyev (Feminine: Fayziyeva) is a surname. Notable people with the surname include:

- Latif Fayziyev (born 1957), Tajik general
- Latif Fayziyev), Uzbek film director
- Babamurat Fayziyev (Bobomurod Fayziyev), Uzbek Sambo wrestler
