= Paratroopers' Day (Tajikistan) =

Holiday in Tajikistan celebrating the Tajik Mobile Forces

Paratroopers' Day (Tajik: Рӯзи нерӯҳои десантӣ-ҳавоӣ, romanized: Rūzi nerūhoi desantī-havoiī) is a day celebrating the Tajik Mobile Forces, which is as service branch of the Armed Forces of the Republic of Tajikistan. It is celebrated on August 4, and has been celebrated on this date since 2007. The holiday was created by the Ministry of Defence. On the holiday in 2014, a war game demonstration was held in Fakhrobod, some 30 kilometers south of Dushanbe, attended by senior officials, as well as other officers, politicians, and veterans of the Soviet invasion of Afghanistan.
