= Alexander Shishlyannikov =

Tajik military officer (1950–2023)

- Александр Шишлянников

Minister of Defence of Tajikistan
- In office January 1993 – 7 April 1995
- President: Emomali Rahmon
- Preceded by: Post Established
- Succeeded by: Sherali Khayrulloyev

Personal details
- Born: 3 November 1950 Tashkent, Uzbek SSR, USSR
- Died: 15 September 2023 (aged 72) Tashkent, Uzbekistan

Military service
- Branch: Soviet Army; Uzbek Ground Forces; Tajik Ground Forces
- Service years: 1971–1995
- Rank: Major General
- Conflicts: Soviet–Afghan War; Tajik Civil War

Major General Alexander Vladimirovich Shishlyannikov (Russian: Александр Владимирович Шишлянников; 3 November 1950 – 15 September 2023) was a Soviet, Uzbekistani and Tajik military officer and the first Minister of Defence of Tajikistan, serving from 1993 to 1995. He was an ethnic Russian.

== Biography ==
=== Soviet Army ===
Alexander Shishlyannikov was born on 3 November 1950 in Tashkent, the capital of the Uzbek SSR. In 1971, he graduated from the Tashkent Higher Tank Command School in Chirchik, and 10 years later, he graduated from the Malinovsky Military Armored Forces Academy in Moscow. In the 1980s, Shishlyannikov served in the Central and Turkestan Military District (based in the Kazakh and Uzbek capitals of Alma-Ata and Tashkent respectively), as well as the Western Group of Forces in East Germany. During this time, he was deployed with the Soviet 40th Army to Afghanistan in the early stages of the Soviet-Afghan War. By the time of the fall of the Soviet Union and the creation of independent nations, he was serving as an officer in the Uzbek defense ministry.

=== Tajikistan ===
In January 1993, Colonel Shishlyannikov was appointed the first defense minister of Tajikistan. He was among 200 officers brought from Uzbekistan on the orders of Emomali Rahmon. One month later on 23 February Shishlyannikov led the celebrations in honor of the founding of the Tajik Armed Forces. During his tenure, it was expected that he would be temporary and would eventually be replaced by Colonel Ramazon Radjabov, his deputy who was in favor with many elite circles.

Shishlyannikov played a key role in the early stages of the Tajik Civil War. In July of that year, he hosted visiting Russian defence minister Pavel Grachev, where he criticized the position of "individual leaders of the CIS countries" for the proposals of the CIS Joint Armed Forces Command to bring peacekeeping forces into the republic being unfulfilled. He was relieved of his post on 7 April 1995, being succeeded by Sherali Khayrulloyev.

== Later life and death ==
General Shishlyannikov returned to Uzbekistan and served as a senior research fellow at the Center for Military Scientific and Applied Research at the Academy of the Armed Forces. He was awarded 3 orders and more than 50 medals and commemorative signs. In 2019, he was awarded the Dustlik Order. Alexander Shishlyannikov died on 15 September 2023, at the age of 72, in Tashkent, Uzbekistan. His funeral ceremony took place on September 16 at the Chirchiq Higher Tank Command and Engineering School, with the Chief of the General Staff of the Armed Forces, Major General Shukhrat Kholmukhamedov in attendance.
