= Chirchiq Higher Tank Command and Engineering School =

Military academy in Uzbekistan

- Чирчиқ олий танк қўмондонлик-муҳандислик билим юрти Chirchiq oliy tank komandir-muhandislik bilim yurti
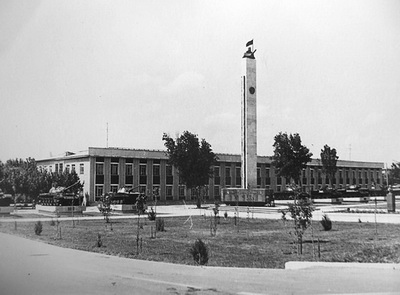
- Tashkent Higher Tank Command School in the postwar period
- Other names: Nizhny Novgorod Infantry Courses (1918–1921); 11th Nizhny Novgorod Infantry School (1921–1932); Nizhny Novgorod (later Gorky) Tank School (1932–1938); Kharkov (later 1st Kharkov) Tank School (1938–1941); Tashkent Tank School (1941–1966); Tashkent Higher Tank Command School (1966–1993)
- Type: Military academy
- Established: November 16, 1918 (as Nizhny Novgorod Infantry Courses)
- Location: 15 Amir Temur, Chirchiq, Uzbekistan; 41.47807°N 69.571030°E

The Chirchiq Higher Tank Command and Engineering School (Uzbek: Чирчиқ олий танк қўмондонлик-муҳандислик билим юрти), formerly the Tashkent Order of Lenin Higher Tank Command School named after Pavel Rybalko (Russian: Ташкентское высшее танковое командное училище имени П. С. Рыбалко (ТВТКУ), romanized: Tashkentskoye vyssheye tankovoye komandnoye ordena Lenina uchilishche imeni dvazhdy Geroya Sovetskogo Soyuza marshala bronetankovykh voysk P. S. Rybalko (TVTKU)), is a military academy of the Ministry of Defense of Uzbekistan, responsible for training armored and engineering personnel of the Uzbekistan Ground Forces.

Established in 1918 as the Nizhny Novgorod Infantry Courses, it became an infantry school in 1921 and was converted into a tank school in 1932, training tank commanders for the expanding Soviet armored forces. It relocated to Kharkov in 1938 and was evacuated to Chirchiq in September 1941 following Operation Barbarossa, the German invasion of the Soviet Union during World War II. The school was renamed the Tashkent Higher Tank Command School in 1966.

Despite its name, the school was located in Chirchiq rather than Tashkent. In 1993, following the independence of Uzbekistan and the dissolution of the Soviet Union, it was renamed the Chirchiq Higher Tank Command and Engineering School.

== History ==
=== Origins ===
The school traces its origins to the creation of the Nizhny Novgorod Infantry Courses of the Red Army command staff on 16 November 1918 during the Russian Civil War. The courses were taught in the building of the city's former eparchial school. Among the first cadets were workers from the city's Krasnoye Sormovo Factory. The faculty were taken from experienced former Imperial Russian Army officers, known as Military specialists. Ippolit Zhilinsky taught tactics, B.N. Moravsky engineering, and K.I. Bussov shooting. The first head of the courses was former Colonel A.I. Goryachev, and the first head of training was Nikolay Pukhov. During the summer of 1919, the first group of cadets graduated and were sent into combat on the Southern Front. In 1921, the courses became the 11th Nizhny Novgorod Infantry School and the training period at the school expanded to three years.

On 15 March 1932, the school was renamed the Nizhny Novgorod Tank School named for I.V. Stalin, and began training tank commanders for the Red Army's new armored forces. The 1st Tank Battalion, a training unit, was formed at the school, commanded by Makar Teryokhin. It became the Gorky Tank School that year when the city was renamed. In the fall of 1934 the first class of tank commanders graduated; they included Georgy Skleznyov, who was posthumously made a Hero of the Soviet Union for his actions in the Spanish Civil War, and future Marshal of the Soviet Union Sergey Sokolov. In March 1938 it was relocated to Kharkov and renamed the Kharkov Tank School named for I.V. Stalin. The school was subsequently renamed the 1st Kharkov Tank School named for I.V. Stalin after a second tank school was established in Kharkov.

=== World War II ===
Following the beginning of Operation Barbarossa, the German invasion of the Soviet Union, on 22 June 1941, 252 lieutenants graduated from the school and immediately sent to the front. In July, a consolidated cadet shock tank battalion under the command of a Major Grishin was formed from a selection of the remaining cadets and commanders, equipped with new T-34 and KV tanks fresh from factories in Kharkov, and sent to the front within three days. In September, as the front line approached Kharkov, the entire group of cadets and instructors from the school took up defensive positions at the stanitsa of Buryn and the khutor of Mikhailovsky, fighting alongside the Kharkov Infantry School. On 22 September the school was evacuated to Chirchiq, where it was renamed the Tashkent Tank School. Two months later, it graduated another class of tank commanders. During the war, the school's training period was accelerated. In 1943, for "outstanding services in training command cadres", the school was awarded the Order of Lenin. During World War II, the school graduated more than 7,000 tank commanders. For their actions, 74 graduates of the school became Heroes of the Soviet Union during the war.

=== Postwar ===
The school began transitioning back to a two-year period of study in 1946, and from 1949 had a three-year training period. In December 1961, as part of De-Stalinisation, the school's honorific 'named for I. V. Stalin' was replaced by 'named for P. S. Rybalko', in honour of the Soviet armour commander Pavel Rybalko. In April 1966, its training period was extended to four years, and the school was renamed the Tashkent Higher Tank Command School. Graduates now received a higher education diploma and a civilian engineer speciality. In 1993, following the independence of Uzbekistan, the school was renamed the Chirchiq Higher Tank Command and Engineering School. From 1997, the school trained tank platoon commanders in the operation and repair of armoured vehicles and equipment, airborne platoon commanders in the operation and repair of armoured and motor vehicles, and tactical short-range anti-aircraft systems commanders in radio engineering, as well as engineers for the operation and repair of armoured vehicles and equipment, and political officers in social sciences.

== Commanders ==
The following officers commanded the school:

- Mikhail Vyazemsky (1937–1938)
- Nikolay Pukhov (1938–1939)
- Boris Delakov (1940–1949)
- Vasily Koshelev (1949–1950)
- Anatoly Kamkov (1974–1977)
- Dmitry Leonov (1977–1985)
- Boris Frolov (1985–1990)
- Yuri Agzamov (1990–1998)

== Notable Graduates ==
- Vladimir Arkhipov
- Dair Asanov
- Afanasy Beloborodov
- Alexander Novikov
- Sergey Sokolov
- Alexander Shishlyannikov, a Tajik military officer and the first Minister of Defence of Tajikistan.

== See also ==
- Tashkent Higher All-Arms Command School
- Armed Forces of the Republic of Uzbekistan
