= Dousti Square =

Urban square in Tajikistan

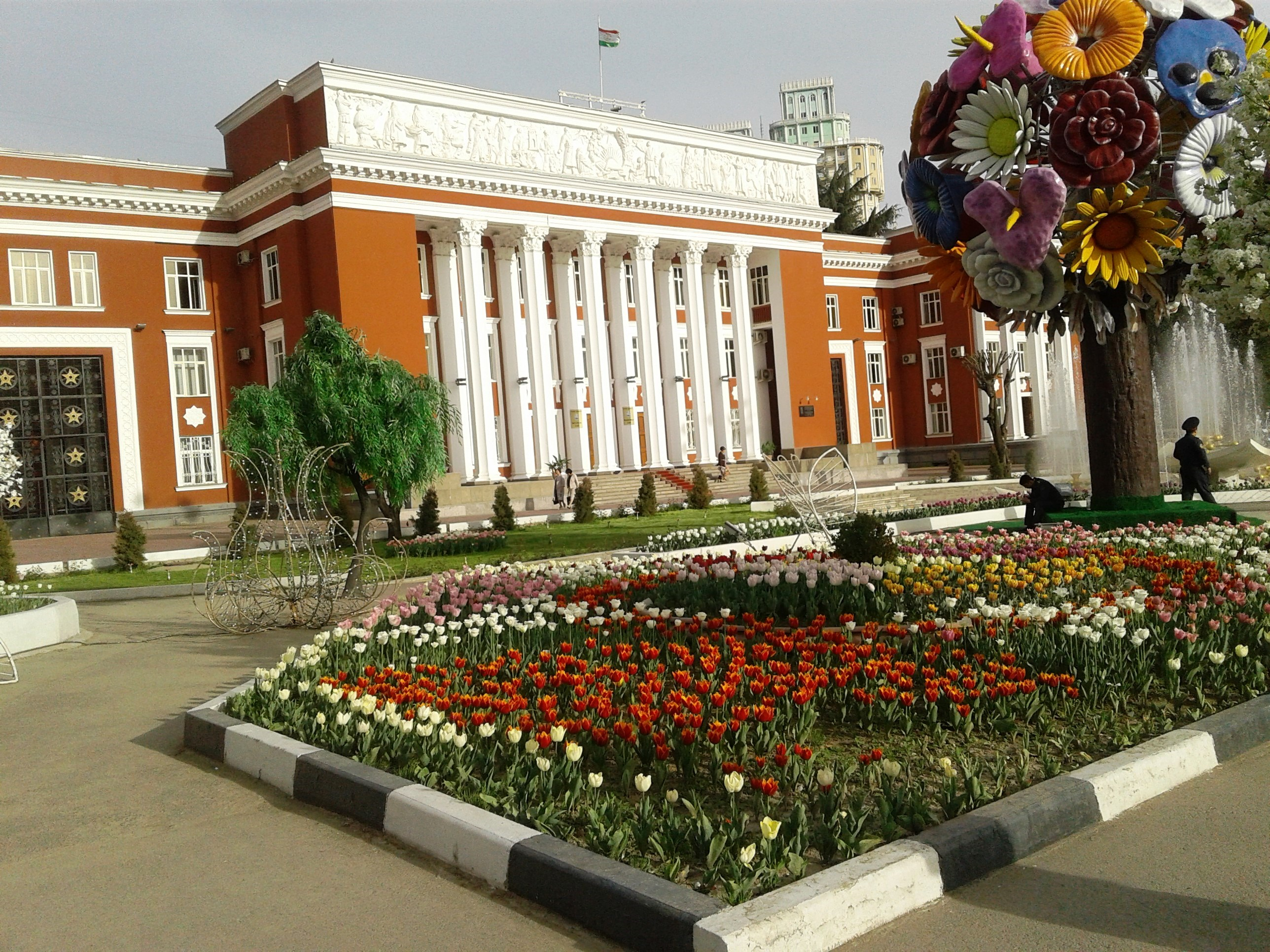
- Tajik Parliament House, Dousti Square, Dushanbe
- Interactive map of Dousti Square
- Native name: Mайдони Дӯстӣ (Tajik); Площадь Дусти (Russian)
- Former names: Lenin Square; Ozodi Square; Somoni Square
- Type: Public square
- Maintained by: Mayor of Dushanbe
- Location: Between Rudaki Avenue and Hofizi Sherozi Avenue, Dushanbe, Tajikistan
- Coordinates: 38°34′26″N 68°47′07″E

Construction
- Construction start: 1940
- Completed: 1961

Other
- Known for: The central square in Dushanbe used as a venue for state events.

Dousti Square (Tajik: Mайдони Дӯстӣ, lit. 'Friendship Square'; Russian: Площадь Дусти) is a square in Dushanbe, Tajikistan. It is connected to Rudaki Avenue and Hofizi Sherozi Avenue. It is the largest square in Dushanbe.

== History ==
The formation of the square began in the 1930s. Its first building was a 2-storeyed building of the Main Post Office on the axis of Lenin Avenue. In the years 1940-1946 a three-story building of the Government House was built on the square. In 1949, the symbol of the Tajik Soviet Socialist Republic was erected in the southern part of the square, an obelisk column with the emblem of the Tajik SSR (architect S. Anisimov, sculptor B. Tatarinov). In 1961 on the western side of the square, a bronze sculpture of Lenin was erected with the governmental tribune. This completed the formation of the square. According to the general plan of the city of Dushanbe, in 1966, and then in 1983, a wide green esplanade overlooking the river was projected Dushanbe. After independence was declared in 1991, a monument to the poet Ferdowsi appeared on the site of the monument to Lenin which was torn down on the night of 22 September and the square was named "Ozodi" (Freedom). The square was given its current name of Dousti in 1997. In 1999, the square was due for reconstruction. After the restoration of the square, a monument to Ismoil Somoni was installed in 1999 in honor of the 1100th anniversary of the Samanid State.

== Landmarks ==
Building	Architectural details	Function(s)
Parliament Building	During the soviet period it served as the headquarters of the government of the Tajik SSR. It was constructed in 1940 by architect S. Anisimov. It was made with three stories to accommodate both houses of parliament.	Serves as a government building. It houses the Supreme Assembly of Tajikistan.
Palace of Nations	It was created in 2002 by an Italian contractor Codest International. The building's 4 has floors, with the last floor being a cupola which measures to 18 meters.	Serves as the official residence of the President of Tajikistan.
Monument to Ismoil Somoni	The present area of the statue formerly had a statue of Vladimir Lenin.	Serves as a national shrine.

=== Other Landmarks ===
- The Tajik Foreign Affairs, Agriculture, Transport and Communications ministries are also located on the square
- In 2018, Tajikistan’s tallest ever New Year's tree was installed on the square. In 2015, a tree was installed at Dousti Square for the first time.

== Events ==
=== State events ===
Dousti Square holds military parades and demonstrations on the occasion of national holidays such as Independence Day, Army Day, Victory Day and before 1990, October Revolution Day, and International Workers' Day. The first parade in Dushanbe (Stalinabad) took place on Red Square on 7 November 1945, with the participation of the 201st Motor Rifle Division, attended by infantry units and military equipment (artillery, armored vehicles, tanks). Revolution Day parades were moved to the modern square in the 1960s. Victory Day Parades were also held on the square in 1965 and 1985. Over the course of all Soviet era parade, vehicles such as the T-72, BTR-80, KAMAZ and the BM-21 Grad rolled through the square. The last Soviet parade was held on the square on 7 November 1990.

The first military parade of independent Tajikistan took place on the square on 23 February 1993, in honor of the founding of the Tajik National Army, which took place that same day. Participants in the parade were attended an induction ceremony in the presence of President Rahmon Nabiyev prior to the start of the parade.

The square also hosted the final part of the inaugurations of President Emomali Rahmon in 2006, 2013, and 2020.

=== Rallies ===
During the Tajik Civil War, many rallies supporting either the government or the rebels took place on the square. Protests on the square also took place from 1990-1991 in opposition to Soviet policies.

== Gallery ==
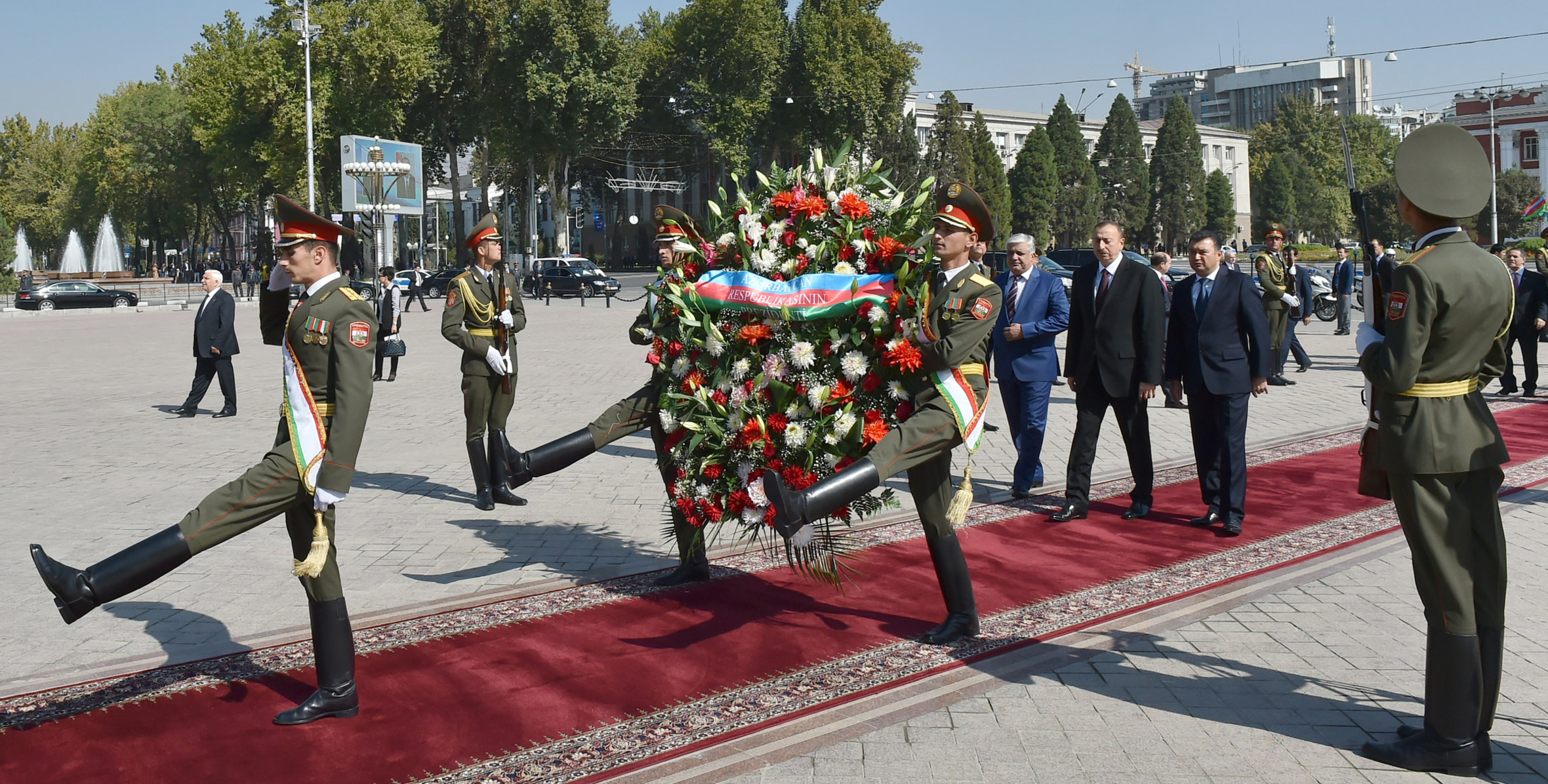
President Ilham Aliyev laying a wreath at the statue of Ismoili Somoni in Dushanbe.

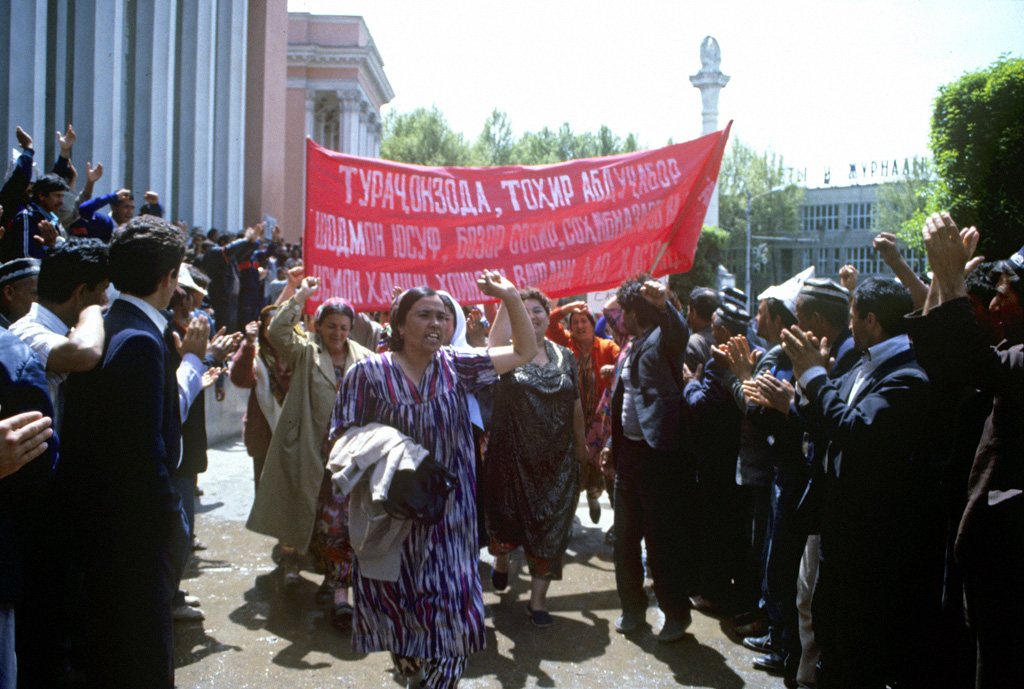
A rally on Ozodi square in 1992.

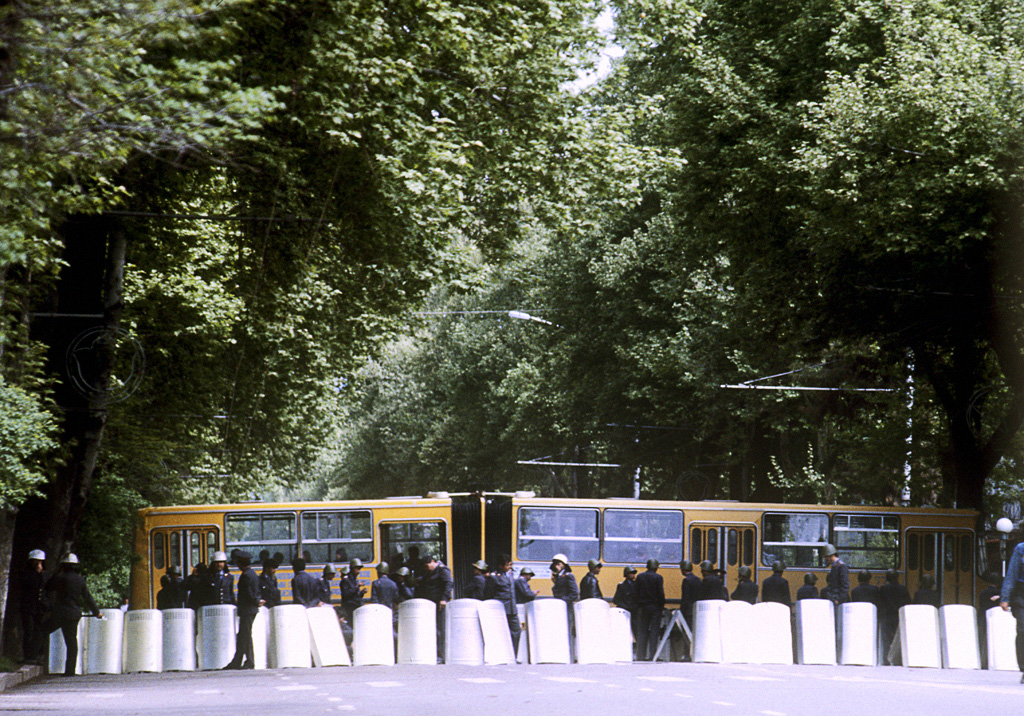
The OMON cordon off two rallies at Ozodi Square.

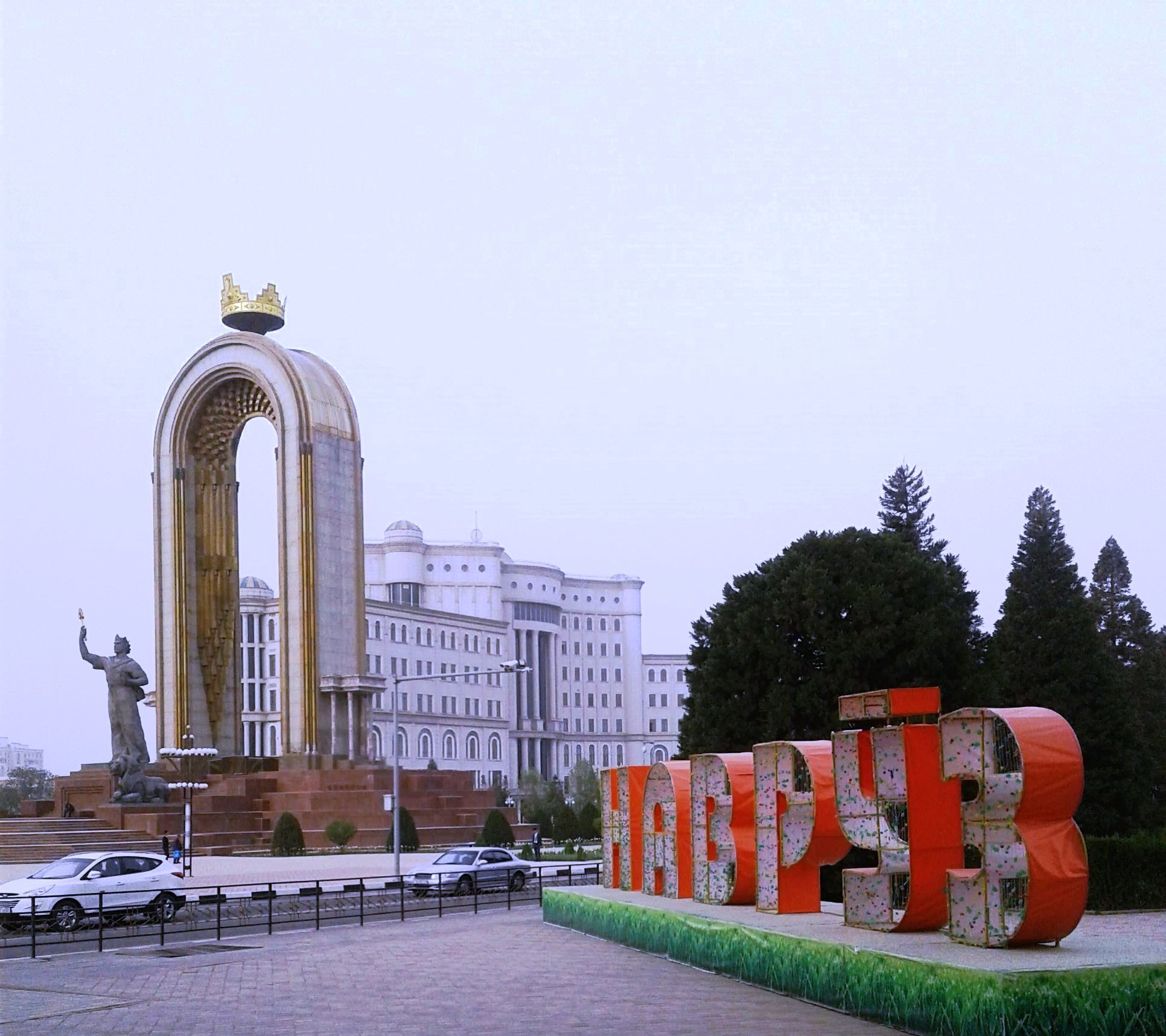
A celebratory Nowruz sign.

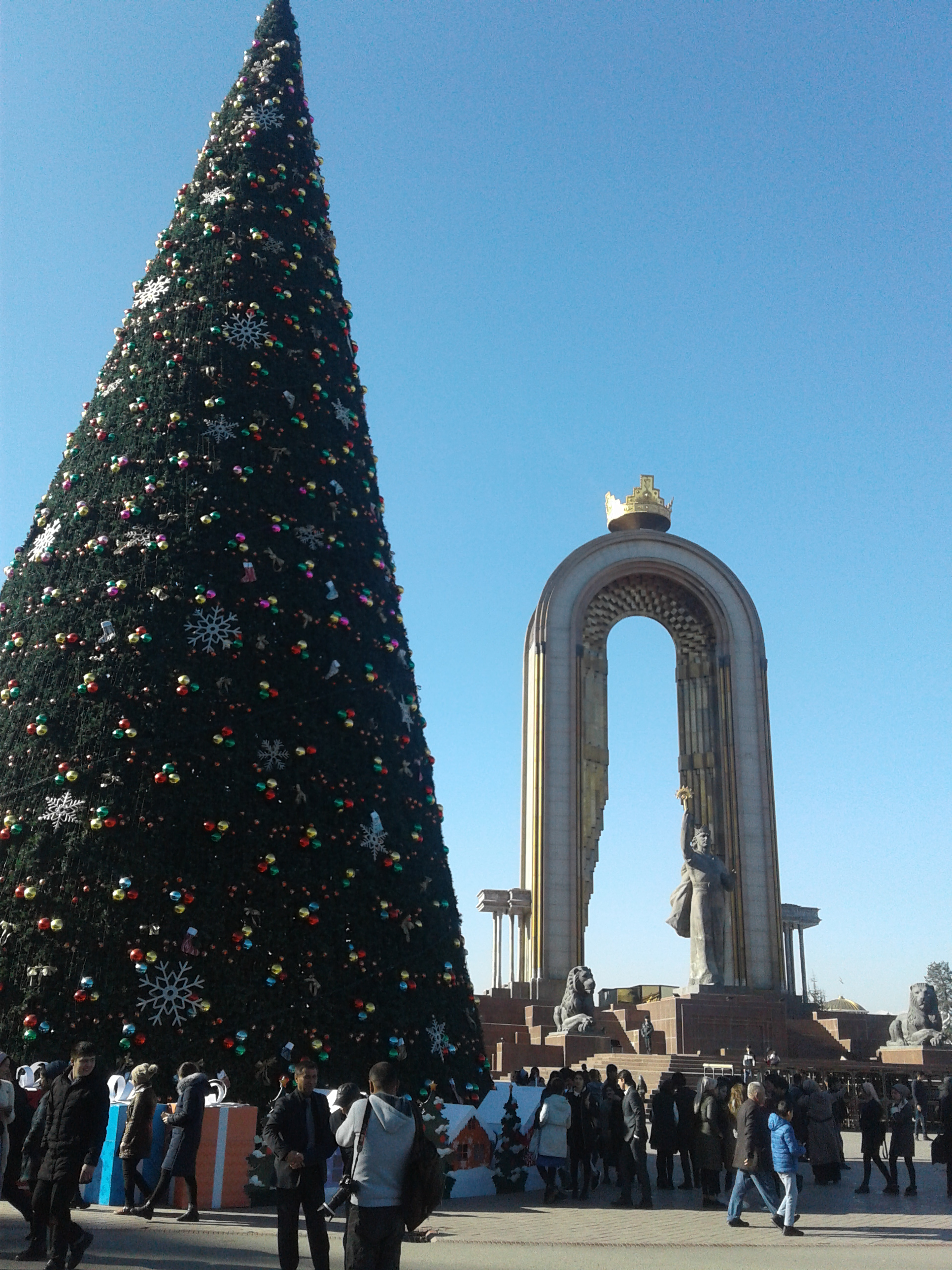
A Christmas tree on the square.

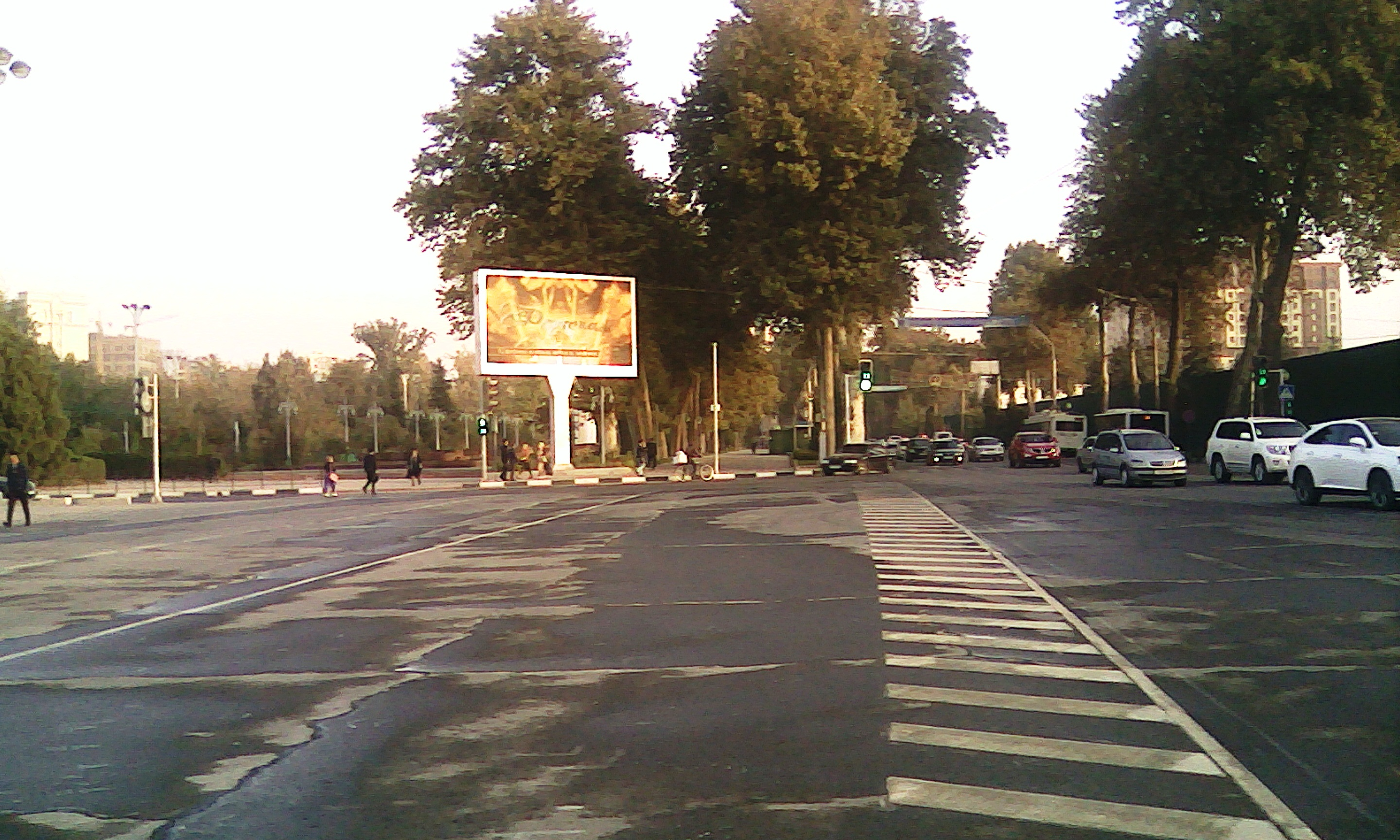
Rudaki Avenue

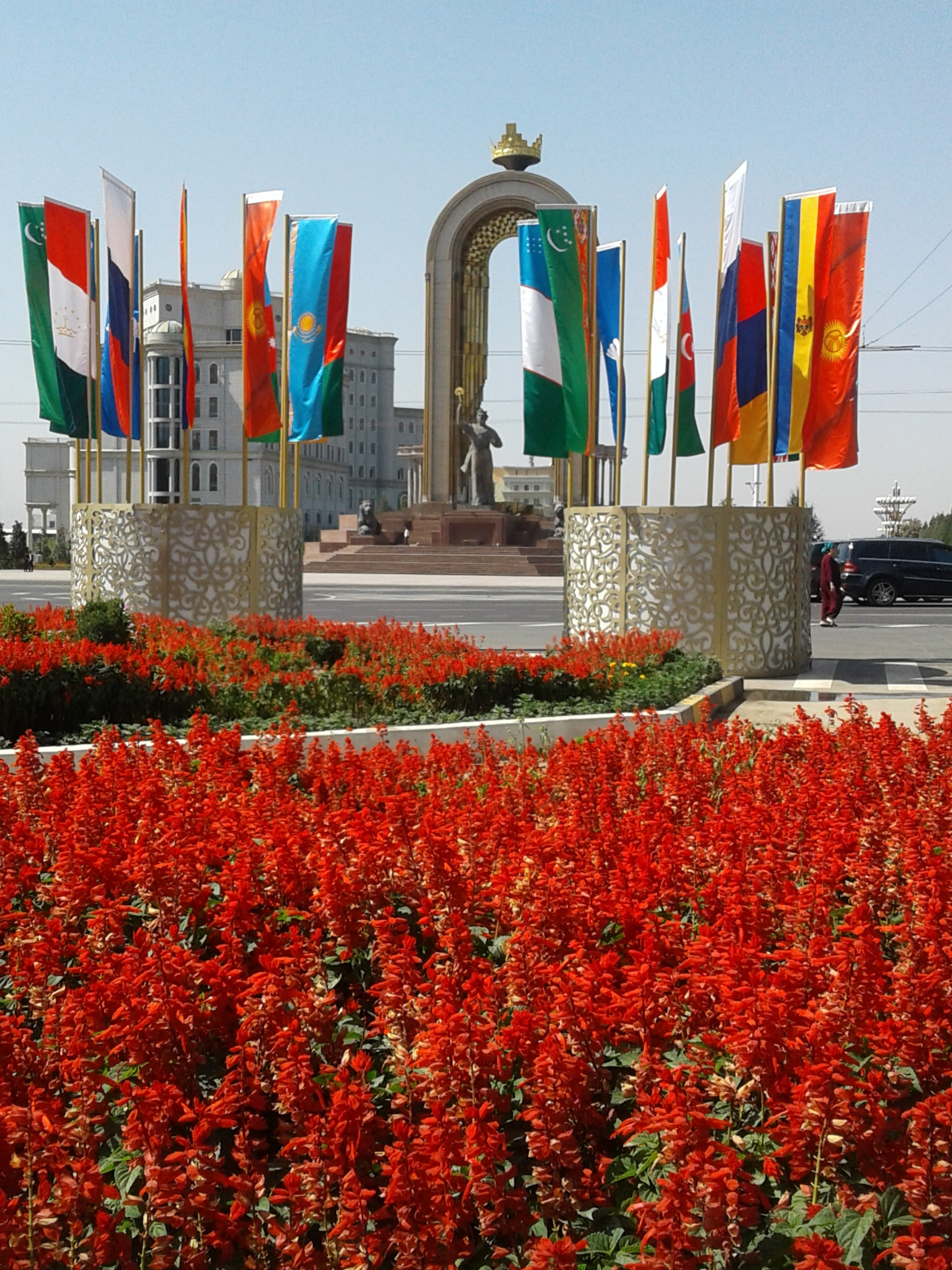
The flags of the Commonwealth of Independent States situated in front of the Somoni statue ahead of the Dushanbe CIS summit in September 2018.

== See also ==
- Independence Square, Nur-Sultan
- Independence Square, Ashgabat
- Mustaqillik Maydoni
- Ala-Too Square
