= Sherali Khayrulloyev =

Tajik military and political leader

- Шералӣ Хайруллоев
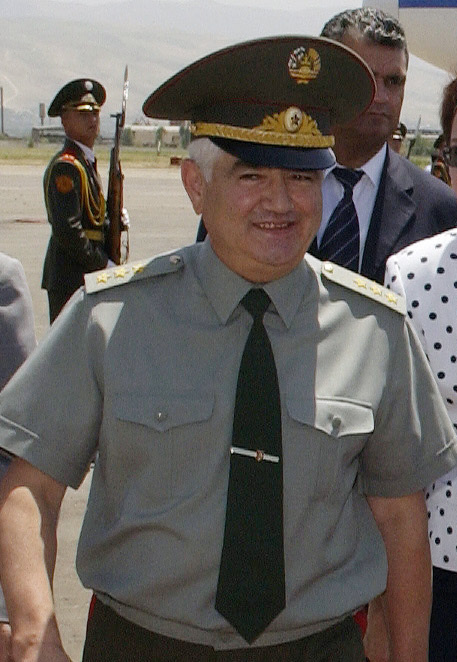
- Khayrulloyev in 2005

Minister of Defense
- In office 7 April 1995 – 20 November 2013
- President: Emomali Rahmon
- Preceded by: Alexander Shishlyannikov
- Succeeded by: Sherali Mirzo

Personal details
- Born: 8 November 1949 (age 76) Hamadoni, Danghara District, Kulob Oblast, Tajik SSR, USSR

Military service
- Allegiance: Soviet Union; Tajikistan
- Branch: Armed Forces of Tajikistan
- Service years: 1970–2019
- Rank: Colonel General (1999)

Sherali Khayrulloyevich Khayrulloyev (Tajik: Шералӣ Хайруллоевич Хайруллоев; born 8 November 1949) is a retired Tajikistani general and politician. He was the Minister of Defense of Tajikistan from 1995 to 2013.

== Early life ==
He was born in November 1949 in the village of Hamadoni, in the Danghara District of the Kulob Oblast. He is Tajik by ethnicity. He graduated from high school in 1966. In 1970, he graduated from the Department of Economics, Tajik National University.

== Military service ==
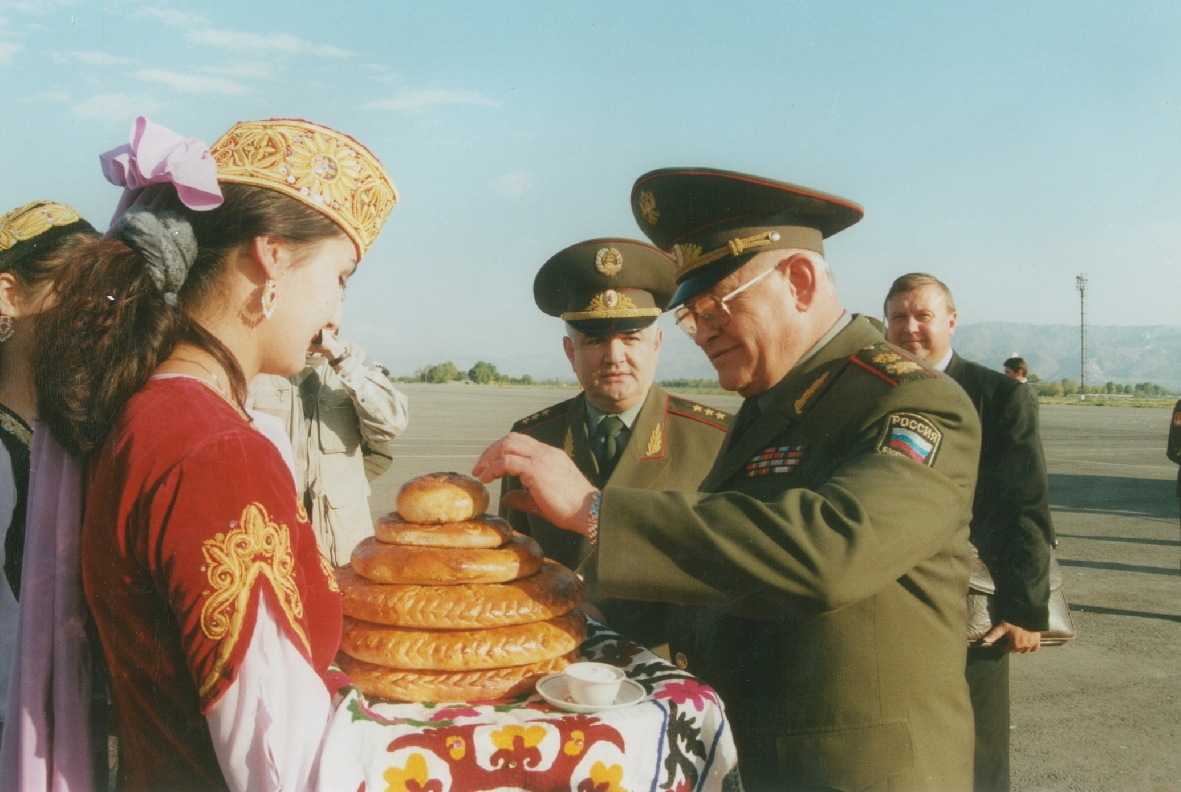
Colonel General Sherali Khayrulloyev with Marshal Igor Sergeyev in Dushanbe.

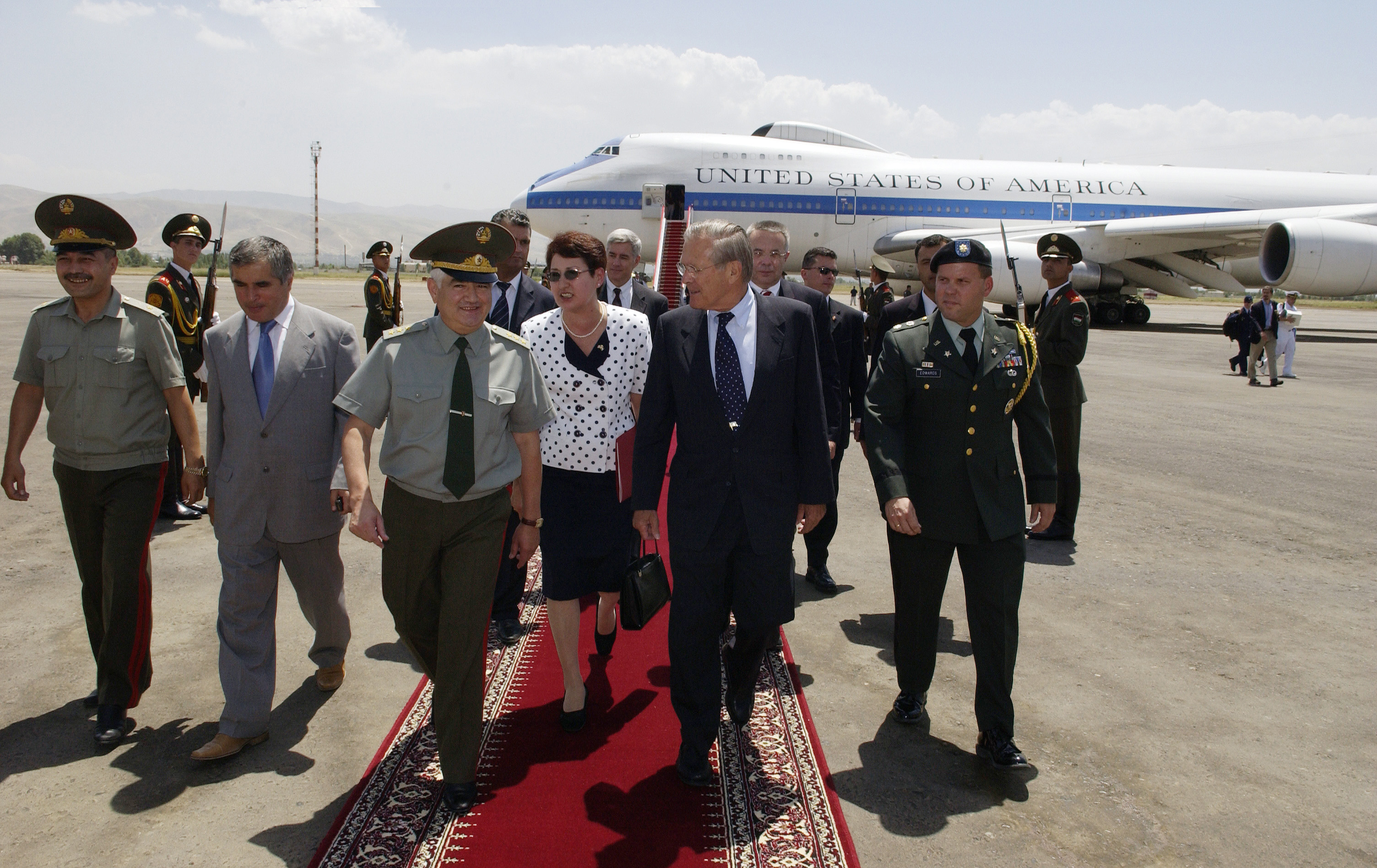
Khayrulloyev (4th from right) talks with U.S Secretary of Defense Donald Rumsfeld (2nd from right) after he arrived in Dushanbe on 26 July 2005.

He joined the Soviet Army in 1970, and served as a brigade battalion accountancy director. He graduated from the Moscow Finance Institute in order in training for this role. While in the Soviet Internal Troops, he served in the village of Nizhnyaya Poyma in the Krasnoyarsk Territory and in the city of Kyzyl (capital of the Tuva Autonomous Soviet Socialist Republic). In 1974, while serving in Tuva, he had his first son.

From 1977 to 1988, he worked in the Interior Ministry of the Tajik Soviet Socialist Republic. He also served in the Department of Correctional Labor Institutions of the MVD. From 1988 to 1995, he served as Vice-Minister for Internal Affairs Tajikistan.

During the Tajik Civil War that began in 1992, he remained loyal to the central government, organizing operations against rebel groups.

=== Defence Minister ===
Khayrulloyev became the minister of defense on 7 April 1995. It was previously expected that his predecessor, Colonel Shishlyannikov, would eventually be replaced by Colonel Ramazon Radjabov, rather than Khayrulloyev. He was reappointed by decree on 1 December 2006 after the 2006 Tajik presidential election.

In 2010, during a dinner meeting with the departing Richard E. Hoagland, Khayrulloyev allegedly questioned NATO's attempts to bring Georgia into the alliance, saying that "Even the Warsaw Pact didn't subsume losers!" also saying that the United States "indulges the adolescent" referring to President Mikhail Saakashvili. He also added that "Without Abkhazia and South Ossetia, Georgia has no hope of existing." He resigned in 2013 due to health issues.

== Advisor to the President (2014–2019) ==
On 25 January 2014, the President of Tajikistan Emomali Rahmon appointed him the Advisor to the President on National Security issues. In March 2019, Khayrulloyev retired from military service.

== Awards ==
- Star of the President of Tajikistan
- (Tajikistan) Order of Ismoili Somoni
- Jubilee Medal "20th anniversary of the State Independence of Tajikistan"
- Honored Worker of Tajikistan
- (Soviet Union) Order of the Badge of Honour of the USSR;
- (Soviet Union) Honored Worker of the USSR Ministry of Internal Affairs
- (Soviet Union) 10 personnel medals of USSR

== Personal life ==
Khayrulloyev is married, and has 2 children. His son Tokhir is a Lieutenant Colonel in the Tajik military, graduating from the Mastibek Tashmukhamedov Military Lyceum of the Ministry of Defense. He is now a Deputy Secretary General of the CSTO. His brother Mirale Khayrulloyev was the former head of the Khatlon administration of the Agency for Drug Control. He is fluent in Tajik, Russian and Uzbek.
