= Independence Day (Tajikistan) =

National holiday in Tajikistan

Independence Day of the Republic of Tajikistan День независимости Таджикистана Рӯзи Истиқлолияти Ҷумҳурии Тоҷикистон
- Also called: Independence Day
- Observed by: Tajikistan
- Type: State
- Significance: The day the Supreme Soviet of the Tajik SSR adopted the Declaration "On the Sovereignty of the Republic of Tajikistan."
- Celebrations: Fireworks, Concerts, Parades
- Date: September 9
- Next time: September 9, 2027
- Frequency: annual

The Independence Day of Tajikistan (Tajik: Рӯзи Истиқлолияти Ҷумҳурии Тоҷикистон, Russian: День независимости Таджикистана), officially known as the Day of State Independence of the Republic of Tajikistan, is the main national holiday of the Republic of Tajikistan.

== Background ==
Facing a spillover of the unrests throughout Eastern Europe that began in Poland, the Tajik Soviet Socialist Republic, among other republics of the USSR declared its sovereignty. On August 24, 1990, for the second session of the Supreme Soviet of the Tajik SSR adopted the Declaration "On the Sovereignty of the Tajik SSR." But this sovereignty was declared while the Soviet Union still existed. Despite this, the declaration was only the first document to on the path to the real independence of Tajikistan, with the former Minister of Justice stating that, "Declaration was the first document towards independence. For example, it is the fifth article that had given the Supreme Council of the Republic the authority to stop the action of the documents of the USSR, which contradicted the legal rights in Tajikistan." After the failed coup organized by the State Committee on the State of Emergency in August 1991, the national republics began the process of proclaiming national independence. The Communist Party of Tajikistan, which had been ruling the republic, was also formally dissolved. On September 9, 1991, at the session Supreme Soviet, a Resolution and Declaration "On State Independence of the Republic of Tajikistan" was adopted, being formally signed by acting president Qadriddin Aslonov. The declaration called for Tajikistan to take control of a portion of Soviet gold reserves, form an independent economic policies etc. At the same, Tajikistan expressed its willingness to join a "union of sovereign states" with other Soviet republics. Tajikistan gained independence formally on December 26, 1991, in connection with the dissolution of the Soviet Union.

== Customs ==
According to the law "On the feast days", September 9 is the main official state holiday in the country and is celebrated every year. The traditional 21-gun salute and fireworks annually take place in honor of the holiday, which is also a non-working day. Military parades of the Dushanbe Military Garrison on Dousti Square celebrating Independence Day have been held quinquennially on September 9, with the 2021 parade being the biggest one as of yet. An annual mass games are also usually held in the central stadium of Dushanbe. Tajik families usually celebrate the holiday with small traditional feasts, as well as with the decoration of cars, buildings, and streets with Tajik flags. Television channels such as Televidenye Tajikistana (1TV First Channel until 2016) and TV Varzish stream all of the official events live during their programs. National festivities of Tajik Independence Day are observed by the Tajik diaspora in Russia, Pakistan, Afghanistan, and the United States.

== Events by year ==
- In 2007, the celebrations marked the 16th anniversary of Independence and 800th birth anniversary of Rumi.
- On Independence Day in 2019, President Rahmon opened the Second Unit of the Rogun Hydropower Plant.
- 2020 marked 29 years of independence, with low-profile events being held due to the COVID-19 pandemic in Tajikistan.
- The 30th anniversary was marked in 2021. In preparation for this event, working groups were created in all regions, cities and districts, with an action plan having been approved. On 23 January 2020, the holiday emblem was adopted, depicting an overpass, a power plant and a tunnel and having the inscription "State independence of Tajikistan" in Tajik and English with the dates are "1991-2021". The quinquennial parade on Armed Forces Day in 2018 was canceled by President Rahmon due to the government refusing to hold any major parades until the 30th anniversary. The first mass pardon since October 2019 was signed by the president for the occasion.

== See also ==
- Culture of Tajikistan
- Tajikistan Independence Day Military Parade

== External links and sources ==
- Празднование 26 летия государственной независимости Республики Таджикистан 2017
- 2001 Dushanbe Independence Day Parade
- 2011 Dushanbe Independence Day Parade
- 2016 Dushanbe Independence Day Parade
- В Душанбе показали огромный флаг и форму от Юдашкина
- 20th anniversary of Tajikistan's independence
