= Ministry of Defence (Tajikistan) =

Government ministry of Tajikistan

Ministry of Defense
- Вазорати мудофиаи
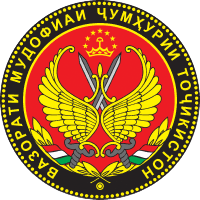
- The ministry's logo

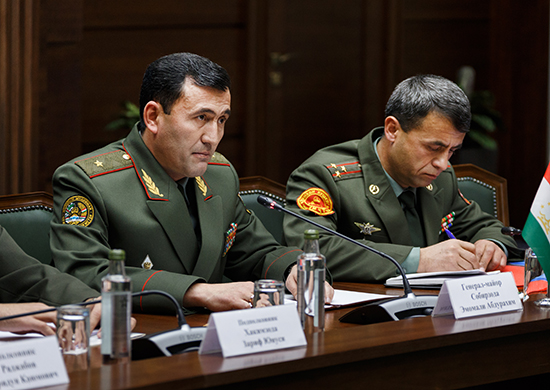
- The current minister of defense of Tajikistan Emomali Sobirzoda.

Agency overview
- Formed: 4 January 1993; 33 years ago
- Jurisdiction: Government of Tajikistan
- Headquarters: 59 Bokhtar Street, Dushanbe
- Minister responsible: Colonel General Emomali Sobirzoda
- Deputy Minister responsible: Colonel-General Bobojon Saidzoda, Chief of the General Staff
- Website: www.mort.tj

The Ministry of Defence of Tajikistan (Tajik: Вазорати мудофиаи Ҷумҳурии Тоҷикистон, romanized: Vazorati mudofiai Çumhurii Toçikiston) is the defence ministry of Tajikistan, overseeing the Tajik Ground Forces, Air Force, Mobile Forces. It also oversees purchases of equipment for the Tajik military. The other branches of the military, such as the Border and Internal Troops, are overseen by the Interior Ministry of Tajikistan. The Defence Ministry was founded in 1993 with Russian assistance.

== History ==
=== Origins ===
The ministry succeeded the Defense Committee of the Republic of Tajikistan, led by former military commissar of the Tajik SSR General Muminzhan Mamadjanov. It was founded just weeks after the Soviet Union was officially dissolved and months after Tajikistan declared its independence. The committee went through multiple phases, with one of its chairmen, Farukh Niyazov, being dismissed on 7 May 1992 at the request of the opposition. The armed forces was led in the interim by Major General Farukhsitdin Rakhmonov.

=== Establishment and aftermath ===
The Ministry of Defense of the Republic of Tajikistan was established by a presidential decree on January 4, 1993. The ministry was under joint Tajik and Russian control until February 1993, when the armed forces were founded. At the time, 200 officers were sent from Uzbekistan to serve in the new Tajik agency on the orders of future President Emomali Rahmon. In 1994, with assistance from the Russian 201st Military Base and Russian authorities in Moscow, the Tajik ministry became fully functional in leading the armed forces under the directive of the President of Tajikistan. On 18 July 1996, a terrorist attack took place at the grounds of the defense ministry, which resulted in the death of one person and the injury of nine people. In September 2015, a group of armed military personnel led by Abduhalim Nazarzoda attacked the defense ministry in an attempt to overthrow the Rahmon government.

== Leadership ==
- Minister of Defense — Colonel General Emomali Sobirzoda
- Chief of the General Staff and First Deputy Minister of Defense — Lieutenant General Bobojon Saidzoda
- Deputy Minister for Military Training — Jamshed Safarzoda
- Deputy Minister of Defense for Armaments and Military Equipment — Odil Nosirzoda
- Deputy Minister of Defense for Political and Educational Affairs – Muzaffar Rahimzoda
- Deputy Minister of Defense for Logistics –

== MoD departments and entities ==
- Central Office
  - Press Centre
- Department of Educational Affairs
- Department of Engineers
- Department of Military Equipment
- Department of Homeland Security (founded in 1997)
- Department of International Cooperation
- Department of the Air Force
- Operational Department
- Financial and Budget Department
- Medical Department

=== Central Office ===
==== Press Centre ====
The Press Centre of the Ministry of Defence (Tajik: Маркази матбуоти Вазорати мудофиаи) has been operating as an part of the Central Office since 1993 and is subordinated to the Minister of Defence. The head of the press centre is appointed and dismissed directly by the Minister of Defence. The staff of the Press Centre consists of a mix of military and civilian personnel. The centre is headed by the following press secretaries: Colonel Faridun Mahmadalizoda (2007—present). In 2015, as a result of military reforms in the ministry, the Information and Recreation Centre was established subordinated to the Press Centre. It includes the following:

- Ministerial TV Group
- Newspaper "Defender of the Homeland"
- Official Website of the Ministry
- Ensemble "Sharaf" of the Ministry of Defence

The Newspaper "Defender of the Homeland" (Tajik: Рӯзномаи «Ҳомии Ватан», romanized: Rūznomai "Homi Vatan") was founded on 10 December 1993, a day when the first issue of which was published in two languages, Tajik and Russian. In its first days of its existence, when it was limited to 11 soldiers. The following have been the newspaper's editor-in-chief:

- Hidoyatillo Tilloyev (1993-2002)
- Colonel Hilol Muzayanov (2002-2015)
- Lieutenant Colonel Farhod Ibodulloev (since 2015)

The motto of the publication is "Bravery, honour and loyalty" (Tajik: «Шуҷоат, шараф ва садоқат»).

=== Medical Department ===
The Military Medical Department was established in 1999 in the Central Office of the Ministry of Emergency Situations and Civil Defense. The military medical department and the military hospital operated in the building of the Central Office until 2004. In 2009, the Medical Department, the Military Medical Commission and the Military Hospital received a new building in Shohmansur.

==== Military Hospital ====
The Central Military Hospital of the Ministry of Defence (Tajik: Госпитали марказии ҳарбии Вазорати мудофиаи Тоҷикистон) is a military hospital for the Tajik Armed Forces. It is located at 40th years of Victory Road in Dushanbe. It cooperates with the Medical Faculty of the Tajik National University.

== Institutions ==
=== House of Officers ===
The House of Officers (Tajik: Хонаи мандати) is a cultural centre and gentlemen's club of the national army. Construction on the building took place between 2012 and 2016 and was built within the framework of a military agreement between the armed forces and the People's Liberation Army of China. It was commissioned by President Rahmon on 5 May 2016. The building consists of five floors and basement area. Rooms in the building include a swimming pool, a large dining room, working rooms and service centres, assembly halls, recreation and entertainment areas and living compartments. There are approximately 20 bedrooms available in the building. The six-storey building is located on Foteh Niazi Avenue in central squares in Dushanbe.

Previously, a House of Officers carrying the name of Marshal Klement Voroshilov was located in Dushanbe from 1930 to 2003, being controlled by the Russian 201st Military Base.

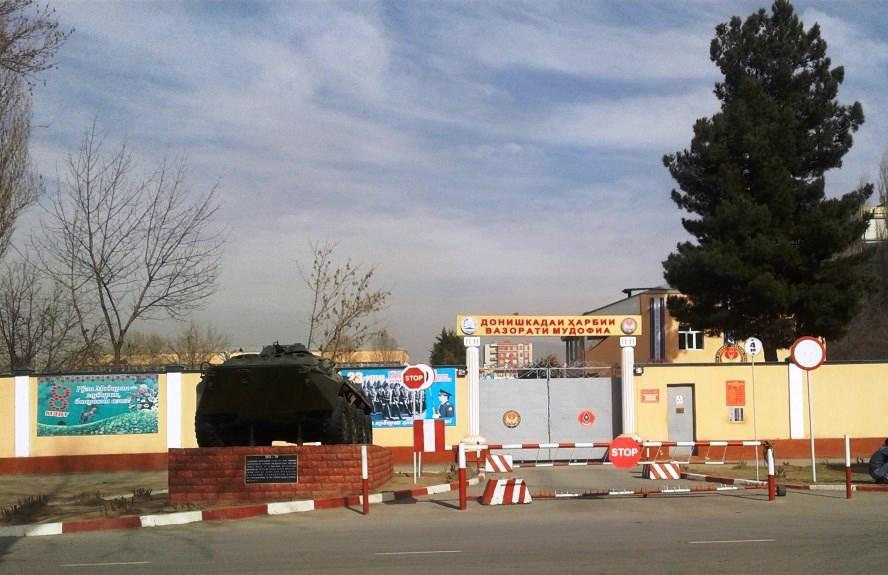
The entrance to the military institute.

=== Central Sports Club of the Army ===
The Central Army Sports Club has been operating under the auspices of the Ministry of Defense since 2003. Athletes of this club, contribute to the development of sports in the Armed Forces as well as the promotion of a healthy lifestyle. Since its inception, it has won 570 gold, 371 silver, 407 bronze medals and a total of 1348 honorary awards.

CSKA Pamir Dushanbe is also affiliated with the defence ministry.

=== Women's Council ===
Since 1996, the Women's Council has been working under the Ministry of Defence of the Republic of Tajikistan.

=== Educational entities ===
- Military Institute of the Ministry of Defense of Tajikistan
- Mastibek Tashmukhamedov Military Lyceum of the Ministry of Defense of Tajikistan

These institutions are the seniormost of their kind in the Tajik Armed Forces.

== Subordinate units ==
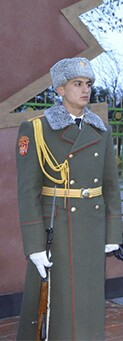
A member of the company in his winter uniform.

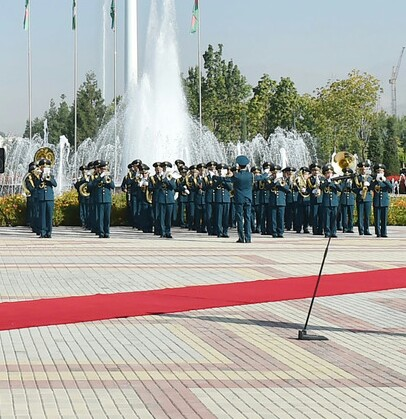
A band at the Kohi Millat in 2014.

- Commandant's Regiment
  - Honour Guard Company
  - Military Brass Band of the Ministry of Defense
- Basic Construction Division
- Guard Battalion (Military Unit 17651)
- Chemical Defence Battalion (Military Unit 15018)
- Ski Platoon - It was established in February 2015 and employs 30 servicemen. It operates out of the Gorno-Badakhshan Autonomous Region.
- Agrarian Battalion - Established in 2016, soldiers called to this unit must have skills in working with agricultural machinery, tillage and animal husbandry. On the territory of this military unit the activity of enterprises for processing of agricultural products, including meat products is organized.
- National Humanitarian De-mining Unit (HDU)

== List of ministers of defence ==
| No. | Portrait | Minister of Defence | Took office | Left office | Time in office | President | Ref. |
|---|---|---|---|---|---|---|---|
| 1 | Alexander Shishlyannikov | Major General; Alexander Shishlyannikov (1950–2023) | 1 January 1993 | 7 April 1995 | 2 years, 96 days | Rahmon Nabiyev; Emomali Rahmon | |
| 2 | Sherali Khayrulloyev | Colonel General; Sherali Khayrulloyev (born 1949) | 7 April 1995 | 20 November 2013 | 18 years, 227 days | Emomali Rahmon | — |
| 3 | Sherali Mirzo | Colonel General; Sherali Mirzo (born 1967) | 20 November 2013 | 23 January 2025 | 11 years, 64 days | Emomali Rahmon | — |
| 4 | Emomali Sobirzoda | Colonel General; Emomali Sobirzoda (born 1972) | 23 January 2025 | Incumbent | 1 year, 259 days | Emomali Rahmon | — |

== See also ==
- Presidential National Guard

== Links ==
- Official Website
- Official Newspaper of the ministry
