= Tajik Mobile Forces =

Mobile Forces of the Ministry of Defense of Tajikistan
- Қӯшунҳои Зудамали Вазорати мудофиаи Ҷумҳурии Тоҷикистон
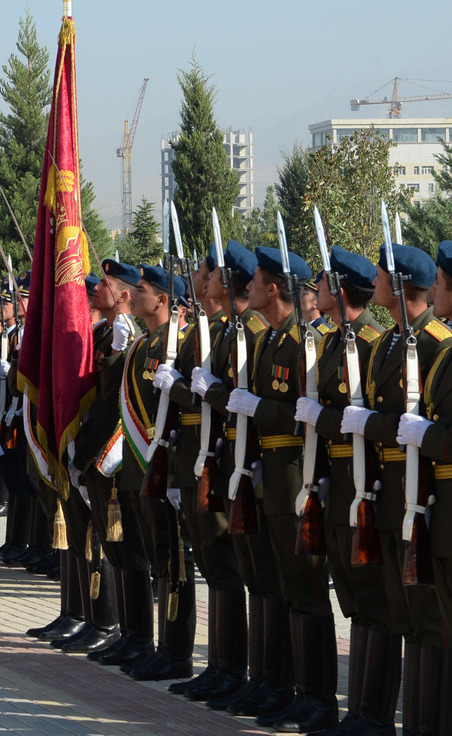
- The honour guard of the Mobile Forces at the Kohi Milat in 2014.
- Founded: September 2003
- Country: Tajikistan
- Type: Paratroopers
- Role: Counterterrorism, special forces
- Size: 20,000
- Part of: Armed Forces of Tajikistan
- Headquarters: Dushanbe International Airport
- Nickname: Rapid Reaction Forces
- Anniversaries: Paratroopers' Day (4 August)

Commanders
- Commander of the Mobile Forces: Major General Mirali Saifullo Rahmatzoda
- Notable commanders: Major General Latif Fayziyev

Insignia
- Identification symbol

The Mobile Forces (Tajik: Қӯшунҳои Зудамали, romanized: Qūshunhoi Zudamali) are the paratroopers of the armed forces of Tajikistan. They are similar to the Russian Airborne Troops, whom they often train with. The Mobile Forces act as an elite special forces unit, subservient to the Defense Ministry and separate from the ground forces. Although they are called paratroopers, the Mobile Forces often deployed out of helicopters, as the Tajik Air Force has few fixed wing aircraft.

== History ==
On 2 August 1997, the 7th Airborne Assault Battalion was formed. It was the first airborne brigade to be formed in the country. About half of the brigade's officer corps, served during the Tajikistani Civil War. In September 2003, the Mobile Forces were created. It was formed from all the airborne units (including the battalion), as well as the special forces, mountain rifle units and some other subunits. On 4 August 2007, the Ministry of Defence created a Paratroopers' Day to celebrate the Mobile Forces.

== Training and cooperation ==
In 2014, a war game demonstration was held in Fakhrobod, some 30 kilometers south of Dushanbe, in which a Mobile Forces sub unit took part in taking out a terrorist group and freeing hostages. The war game was attended by senior officials of the Ministry, as well as other officers, politicians, and veterans of the Soviet invasion of Afghanistan.

=== France ===
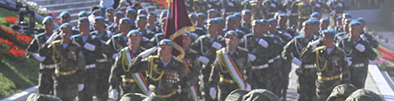
Members of the Mobile Forces.

In 2002, the Mobile Forces performed drills with special forces units from France, at Dushanbe International Airport. It led to the two nations planning greater military cooperation in the future. In 2009, another war game occurred at Fakhrobod, this time led by instructors of the French Air Force. Using French aircraft, some 50 Mobile Forces and National Guard soldiers practiced parachuting from airplanes. In late 2011, France trained more paratroopers of the Tajik Military Institute, Mobile Forces, and National Guard. They jumped from C-160 aircraft.

=== China ===
A three-day joint training operation took place on 14 September 2006, known as Interaction 2006, with the Mobile Forces and the People's Liberation Army of China. The operation trained Chinese and Tajik troops in counter terrorism, crisis response, and strengthening the countries' capability of facing new threats. The training took place in the northern Khatlon province, at the Mumirak military base. The operation had two stages. The first included preparations for interactions between the two countries. The second focused on joint counter terrorism operations at the Mumirak range.

=== CSTO and CIS ===
On 27 September 2011, Tajikistan and Kyrgyzstan signed the plan of bilateral military cooperation for 2012 on the sidelines of the ongoing joint military exercise. Commander of the Mobile Forces, Major General Latif Fayziyev, was in overall command of the war game. A joint military exercise for between Tajikistan and Kyrgyzstan with the participation of the Mobile Forces was launched in the Tajik eastern Jirgatol district, Rasht Valley. The exercise scenario was based on surrounding a group of international terrorists in one of mountain gorges in Jirgatol on the Tajik-Kyrgyz border.

Later in 2012, the Mobile Forces performed training with the Collective Security Treaty Organization in the Chelyabinsk Oblast of Russia. A mountain company of the Mobile Forces as well as the special group of the Ministry of Defense took part in the war game. It ended in August 2012.

== Peacekeeping operations ==
The Peacekeeping Operations Battalion, became one of the best units of the National Army due to it being trained by the National Guard of the United States in a partnership program. Since 2007, the United States, through the Global Peacekeeping Operations Initiative (GPOI) program, has been helping the Mobile Forces build its peacekeeping capabilities. The battalion has operated since 2010 in Dushanbe. Since 2012, battalion units have taken part in a number of multinational peacekeeping exercises in Mongolia, Nepal, Kazakhstan, Germany and the United States. The US intended for the battalion to be sent as a peacekeeper unit along with other United Nations forces. In 2016, the U.S. Embassy in Dushanbe handed over a built sanitary and hygiene complex for the peacekeeping battalion of the Mobile Forces.

== Structure ==
Tajikistan Mobile Forces consist of

- 7th Airborne Assault Brigade
- separate rapid response Motorized rifle brigade
- 3 Infantry Battalions (one of which is part of the Collective Rapid Reaction Force of the Collective Security Treaty Organization (CSTO)
- 89th Tank Regiment
- 74th Artillery Regiment
- 21st Independent Missile Division
- 67th Control and Artillery Reconnaissance Battery
- 61st Engineer Sapper Battalion
- 70th Repair and Recovery Battalion Battalion
- 127th Battalion of Material Support

== Commanders ==
- Major General Latif Fayziyev (2006–2014)
- Major General Mirali Saifullo Rahmatzoda (since 18 January 2014)
