= Palace of the Nation, Dushanbe =

Official residence of the President of Tajikistan

Palace of the Nation
- Interactive map of the Palace of the Nation area

General information
- Status: Active
- Location: Shirinshoh Shohtemur Street, Dushanbe, Tajikistan
- Coordinates: 38°34′34″N 68°46′43″E
- Current tenants: Emomali Rahmon
- Completed: 2008

Technical details
- Floor count: 4 floors

Design and construction
- Main contractor: Codest International

The Palace of the Nation (Tajik: Қасри Миллат, romanized: Qasri Millat; Russian: Дворец Нации, romanized: Dvorets Natsii) is the official residence of the President of Tajikistan. It is located on Shirinshoh Shohtemur Street in central Dushanbe. The Presidential Palace is surrounded by the Dushanbe Flagpole to the north, Rudaki Park to the east, Dousti Square to the south and Varzob River to the west.

The palace was built by Rizzani de Eccher, an Italian construction company.

== History ==
The construction of the Palace began in 2000. In early 2006, the Dushanbe Synagogue, the local mikveh (ritual bath), a kosher butcher shop, and several Jewish schools were demolished by the government without compensation to make room for the new palace. After an international outcry, the government announced a reversal and said that would allow the synagogue to be rebuilt at its current site. However, in the final stages of the palace's construction, the government destroyed the entire synagogue, leaving Tajikistan without a synagogue as it was the only one in the country. This resulted in the majority of Tajik Bukharan Jews having negative views of the Tajik government.

On the eve of the Shanghai Cooperation Organisation summit in Dushanbe in August 2008, the palace was completed, with the summit events being partially held under the golden dome with 20-meter columns. An image of the palace is imprinted on the back of a 500 Somoni banknote, which is the national currency of Tajikistan. In September 2018, Belarusian President Alexander Lukashenko became the first foreign leader to visit the new wooden halls and rooms in the palace. The Old Presidential Palace, the former seat of the Council of Ministers of the Tajik Soviet Socialist Republic), which was located on Rudaki Avenue, was demolished in 2023. In its stead, China helped build a new building for the republic's government and parliament.

== Gallery ==
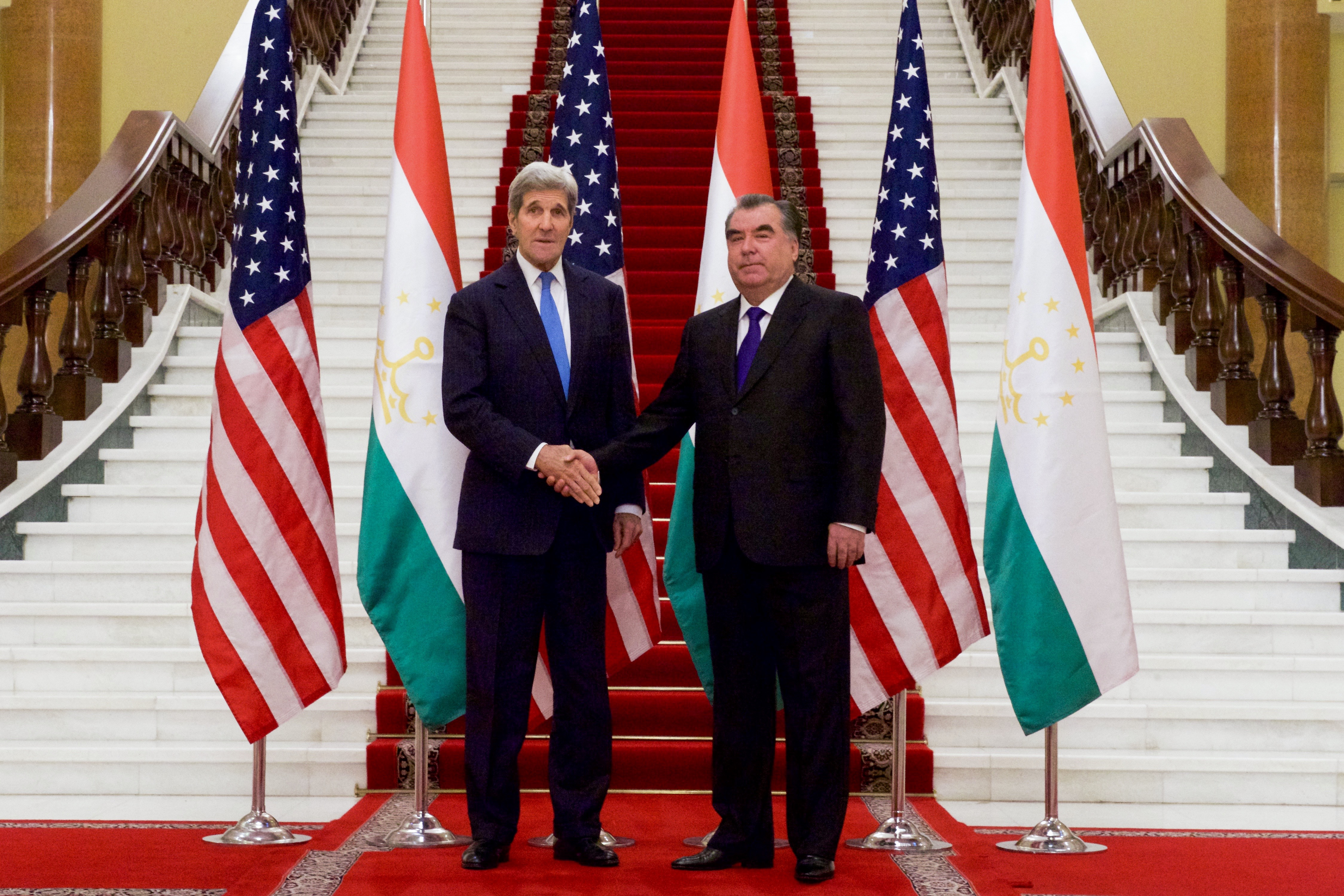
U.S. Secretary of State John Kerry shaking hands at the Palace in 2015

Indian Prime Minister Narendra Modi being welcomed at the Palace in 2015

Dushanbe Flagpole to the north

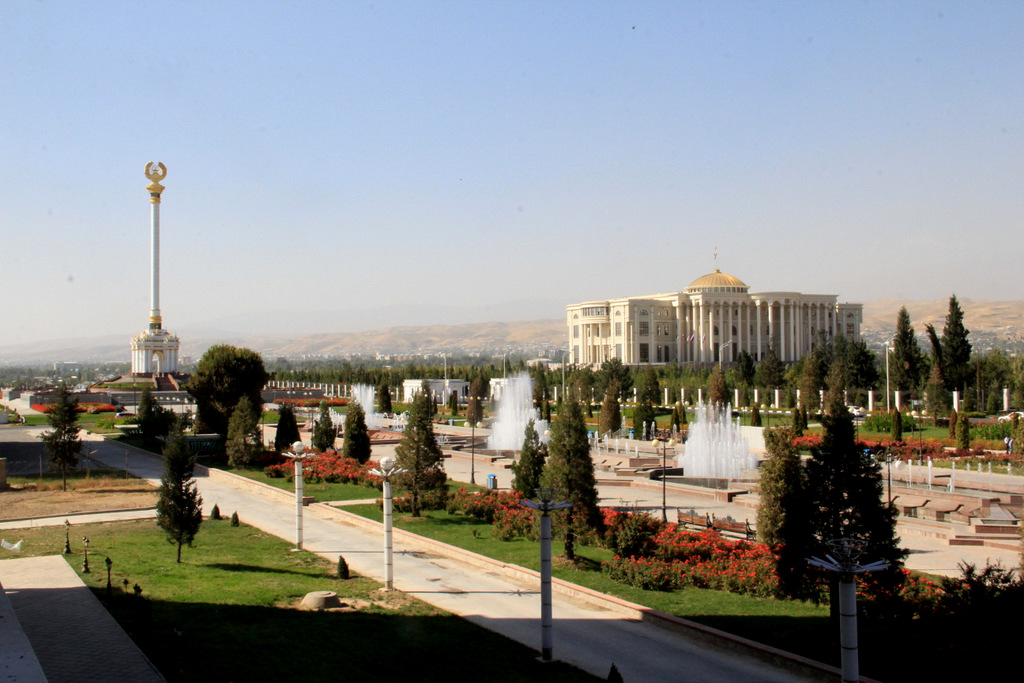
Independence Monument to the south

The Palace of the Nation as seen from Rudaki Park

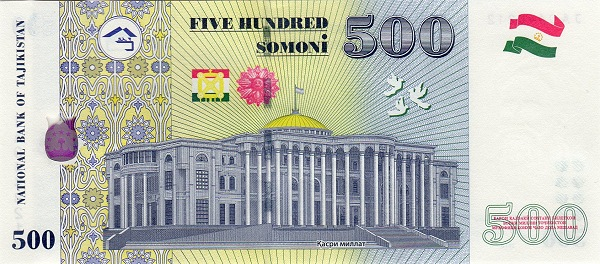
500 somoni banknote of 2010, with an image of the Palace

Old Presidential Palace on Rudaki Avenue, demolished in 2021
