= Rudaki Avenue =

Street in Dushanbe, Tajikistan

Coordinates: 38°35′33.2″N 68°47′12.6″E

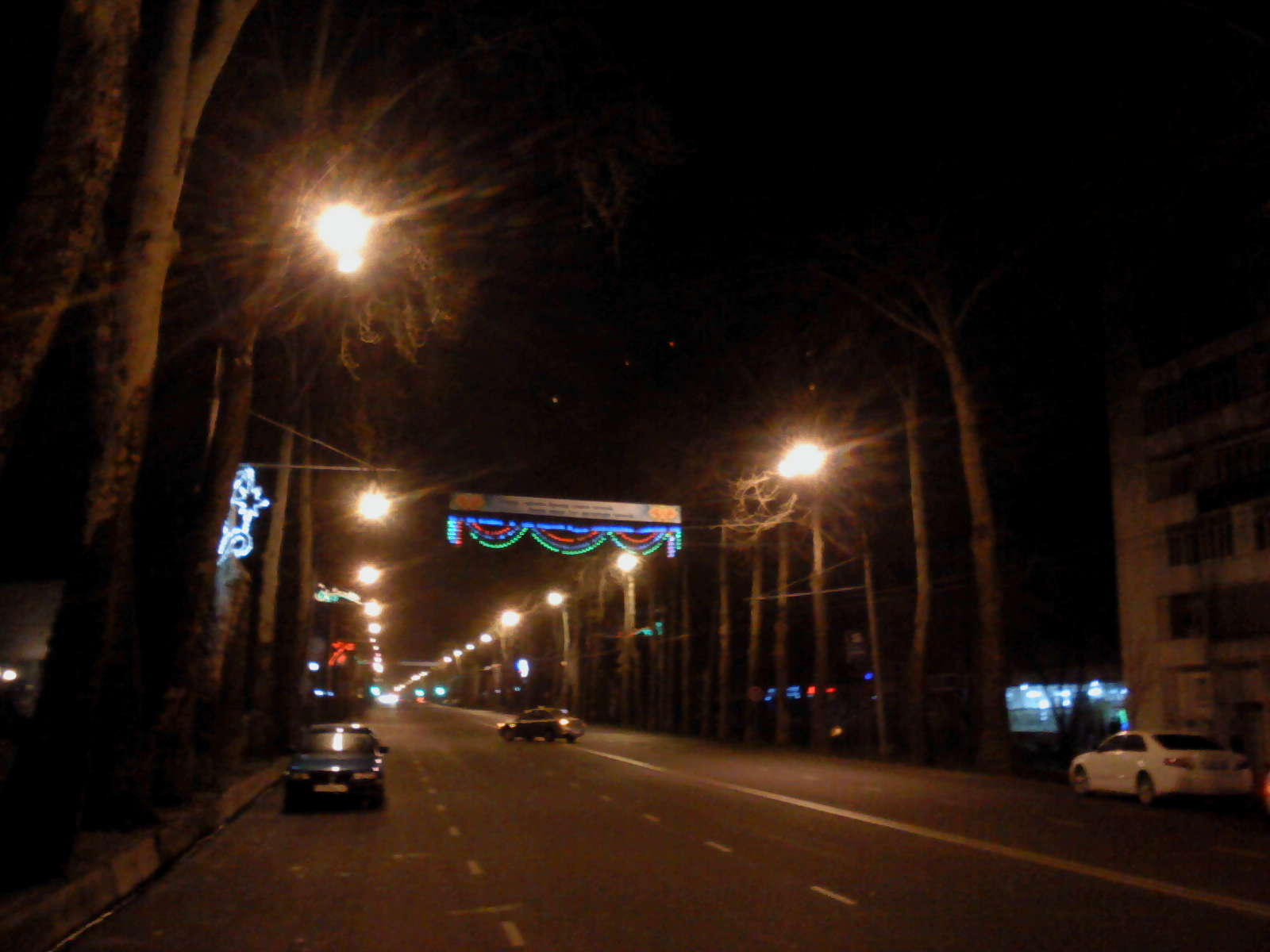
Rudaki Avenue at night

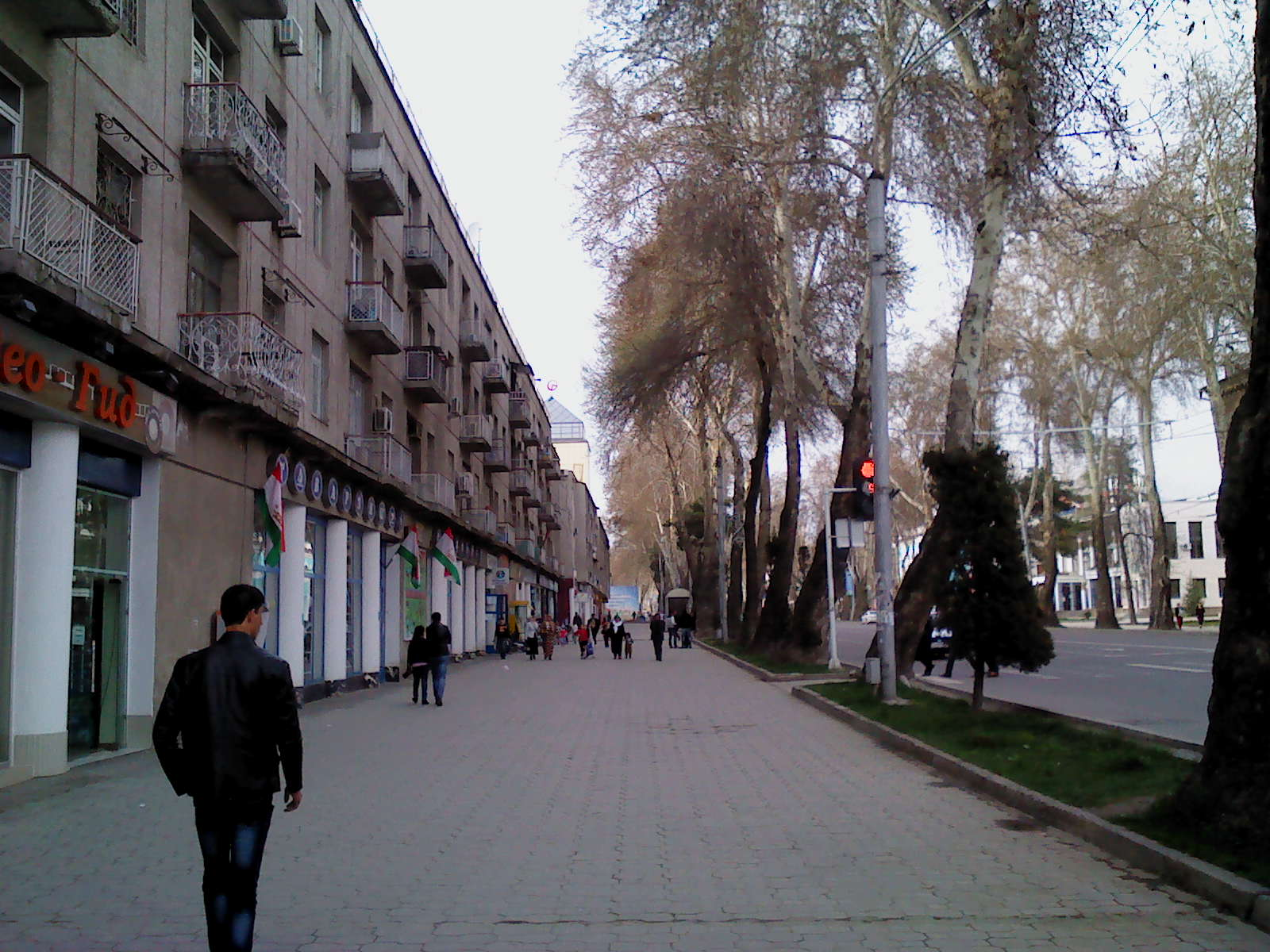
Rudaki Avenue sidewalk

Rudaki Avenue (Tajik: хиёбони Рӯдакӣ, romanized: khiyoboni Rūdakī, Russian: проспект Рудаки, romanized: prospekt Rudaki) is the main thoroughfare street in Dushanbe, the capital of Tajikistan. The street is named after Rudaki, the Tajik national poet. The street was known as Lenin Avenue during the Soviet period, and used to host a statue of Vladimir Lenin. The street received its current name in the summer of 1992.

Key administrative buildings and cultural institutions are located on the street.

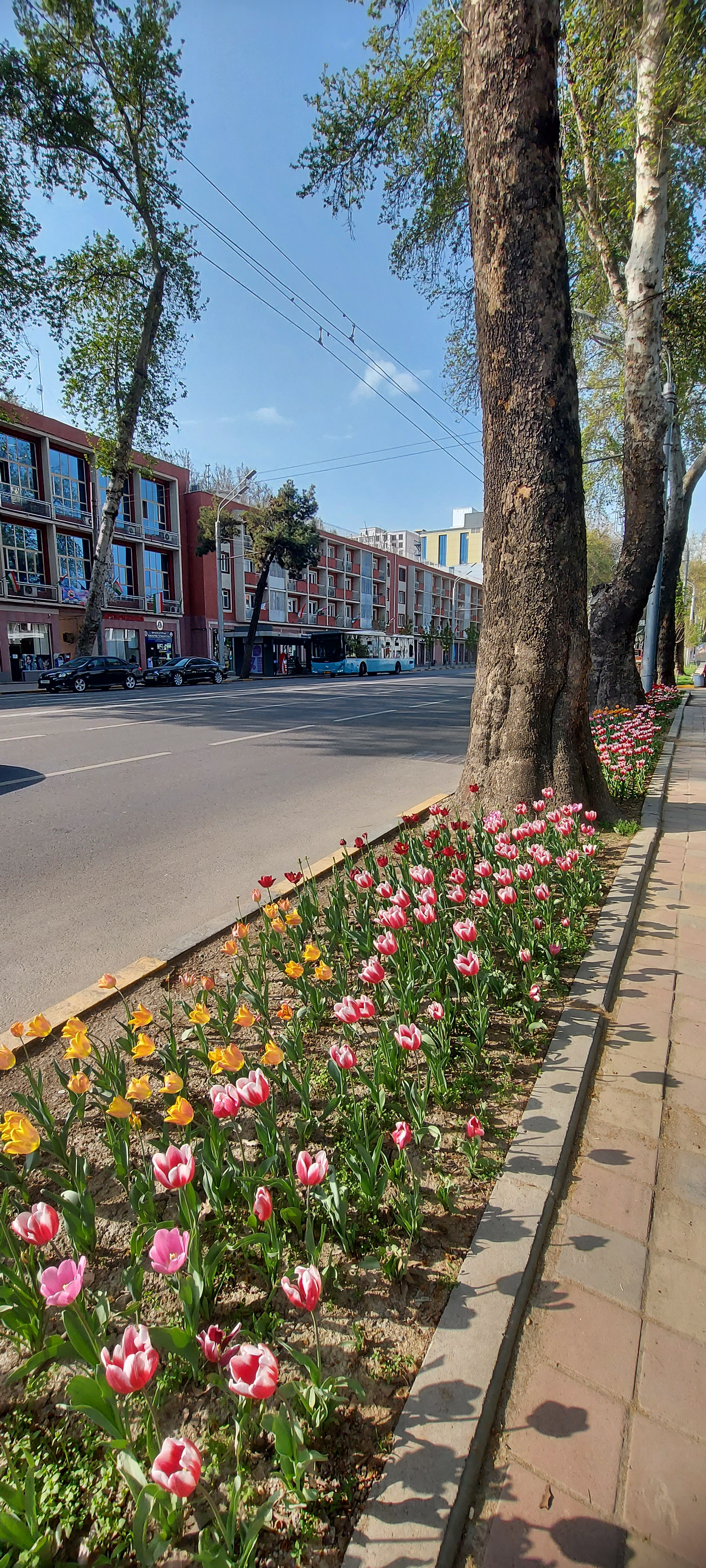
Rudaki avenue (2023)
