= Istaravshan District =

- District
- Location of Istaravshan District in Tajikistan
- Country: Tajikistan
- Region: Sughd Region
- Capital: Istaravshan
- Time zone: UTC+5 (TJT)
- Official languages: Russian (Interethnic); Tajik (State)

Istaravshan District (Russian: Истаравшанский район) or Nohiya-i Istaravshan (Tajik: Ноҳияи Истаравшан), formerly Uroteppa (or Ura-Tyube) District (Tajik: Уротеппа, Russian: Ура-Тюбе), is a former district in the central part of Sughd Region, Tajikistan, between the border with Uzbekistan to the west and Ghonchi district to the east. Its capital is Istaravshan (called Ura-Tyube until 2000). Around 2018, it was merged into the city of Istaravshan.

== Administrative divisions ==
The district was divided administratively into jamoats. They were as follows (and population).

Jamoats of Istaravshan District
| Jamoat | Population |
| Frunze | 11058 |
| Guli Surkh | 28799 |
| Javkandak | 7535 |
| Kommunizm | 22190 |
| Leninobod | 11468 |
| Nijoni | 7747 |
| Nofaroj | 7343 |
| Poshkent | 13292 |
| Pravda | 11652 |
| Qalaibaland | 6759 |
