= Hisor, Tajikistan =

Hisor Tajik: Ҳисор
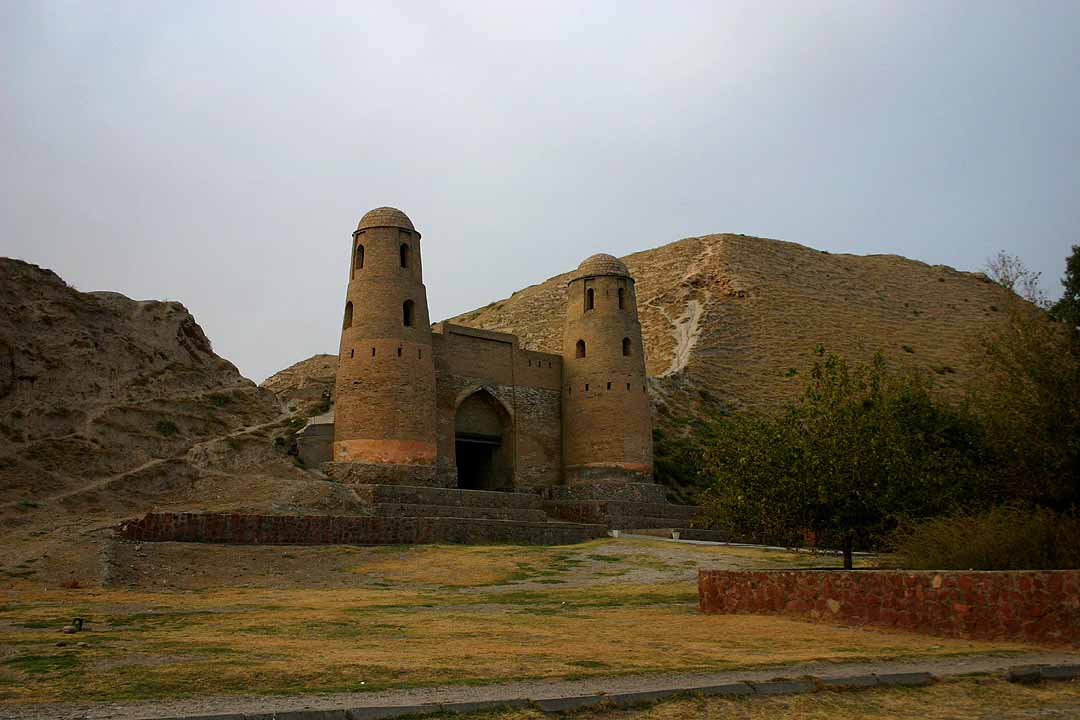
- Old gate to the castle in Hisor
- Interactive map of Hisor
- Coordinates: 38.5264°N 68.5381°E
- Country: Tajikistan
- Region: Districts of Republican Subordination
- Elevation: 802 m (2,631 ft)

Population (2020)
  - City: 308,100
  - Urban: 29,100
- Time zone: UTC+5

Hisor (Tajik: Ҳисор) or Hisar (Russian: Гиссар, Gissar) is a city in western Tajikistan, about 15 km west of Dushanbe. The city was the seat of the former Hisar District, and is part of the Districts of Republican Subordination. It lies at an altitude of 799–824 m, surrounded by high mountains (Gissar Range to the north, Babatag and Aktau ranges to the south). The river Khanaka, a tributary to the Kofarnihon, flows through the town. Its population is estimated at 29,100 for the city proper and 308,100 for the city with the outlying communities (2020). As of 2002, its population was composed 81.6% of Tajiks, 12.3% Uzbeks, 3.6% Russians, and 2.5% others.

== History ==
The fort of Hisar, residence of the Bukharan governor, is said to date back to Cyrus the Great and to have been captured twenty one times.

In 1504 the region was conquered by Muhammad Shaybani. Babur briefly conquered Hisar in 1511, but came back under control of the Uzbeks not long after. Hisar became a semi-independent principality in the next few decades and was ruled by a sultan, furnishing troops for Bukhara's military campaigns. In the 17th century the Tajiks became the dominant power in the region, obtaining the governorship of Hisar. During this period the Bukharan khanate was split between the khan in Bukhara and the ruler (usually one of his relatives) in Balkh, and Hisar was generally subordinate to the latter. The decline of Bukharan power after the assassination of Ubaydullah Khan in 1711 resulted in Hisor asserting its independence.

Only after the signing of the conclusion of the Russian conquest of Bukhara with the signing of "Russian-Bukharan treaty of 1868", and with Russian military aid, was Bukhara able to reintegrate Hisar into its domain. With the dissolution of Bukhara and the National delimitation in the Soviet Union, the region (and Eastern Bukhara as a whole) was again separated and it officially became the core of the Tajik ASSR. The process was a result of practical consideration, as the Eastern half of Bukhara Emirate was more remote, more feudal, and less economically developed than the Western half (where the capital Bukhara was located), as well as the emergence of Tajik national identity, its divergence and clash with Uzbek national identity, and the result of intense debates and mutual compromise between the two emerging respective Tajik and Uzbek intelligentsias.

Hisar was made a city on June 26, 1993.

== Subdivisions ==
Before ca. 2018, Hisar was the seat of Hisar District, which covered the rural part of the present city of Hisar isor. The city of Hisar covers Hisar proper, the town Sharora and ten jamoats. These are as follows:

Jamoat	Population (Jan. 2015)
Sharora (town)	12,700
Almosi	21,261
Dehqonobod	20,686
Durbat	20,052
Hisor	32,912
Khonaqohikuhi	27,624
Mirzo Rizo	25,971
Mirzo Tursunzoda	20,303
Oriyon	
Navobod	26,321
Somon	28,691

== Geography ==
=== Climate ===
Hisar has a hot-summer Mediterranean climate (Köppen climate classification Csa). The average annual temperature is 14.1 °C or 57.4 °F. The hottest month is July with an average temperature of 23.9 °C or 75.0 °F and the coolest January with an average temperature of 1.7 °C or 35.1 °F. The average annual precipitation is 568 millimetres or 22.36 inches and there is an average of 90.5 days with precipitation. The wettest month is March with an average of 107.2 millimetres or 4.22 inches of precipitation and the driest month is August with an average of 0.8 millimetres or 0.03 inches.

Climate data for Hisar
Month	Jan	Feb	Mar	Apr	May	Jun	Jul	Aug	Sep	Oct	Nov	Dec	Year
Daily mean °C (°F)	1.7 (35.1)	3.2 (37.8)	8.5 (47.3)	14.6 (58.3)	18.9 (66.0)	23.9 (75.0)	26.2 (79.2)	24.6 (76.3)	19.9 (67.8)	14.2 (57.6)	9.0 (48.2)	4.6 (40.3)	14.1 (57.4)
Average precipitation mm (inches)	65.7 (2.59)	73.4 (2.89)	107.2 (4.22)	105.0 (4.13)	86.2 (3.39)	7.4 (0.29)	3.8 (0.15)	0.8 (0.03)	3.1 (0.12)	30.8 (1.21)	43.2 (1.70)	59.4 (2.34)	568.0 (22.36)
Average precipitation days (≥ 0.1 mm)	11.0	12.2	14.8	12.9	10.2	2.9	1.5	0.6	1.1	5.4	7.3	10.6	90.5
Average relative humidity (%)	67.7	66.8	63.8	60.6	54.0	41.3	39.3	40.6	43.1	52.1	57.9	65.6	54.4
Source: "The Climate of Hisar". Weatherbase.
