= Hisor District (Tajikistan) =

Coordinates: 38°32′N 68°33′E

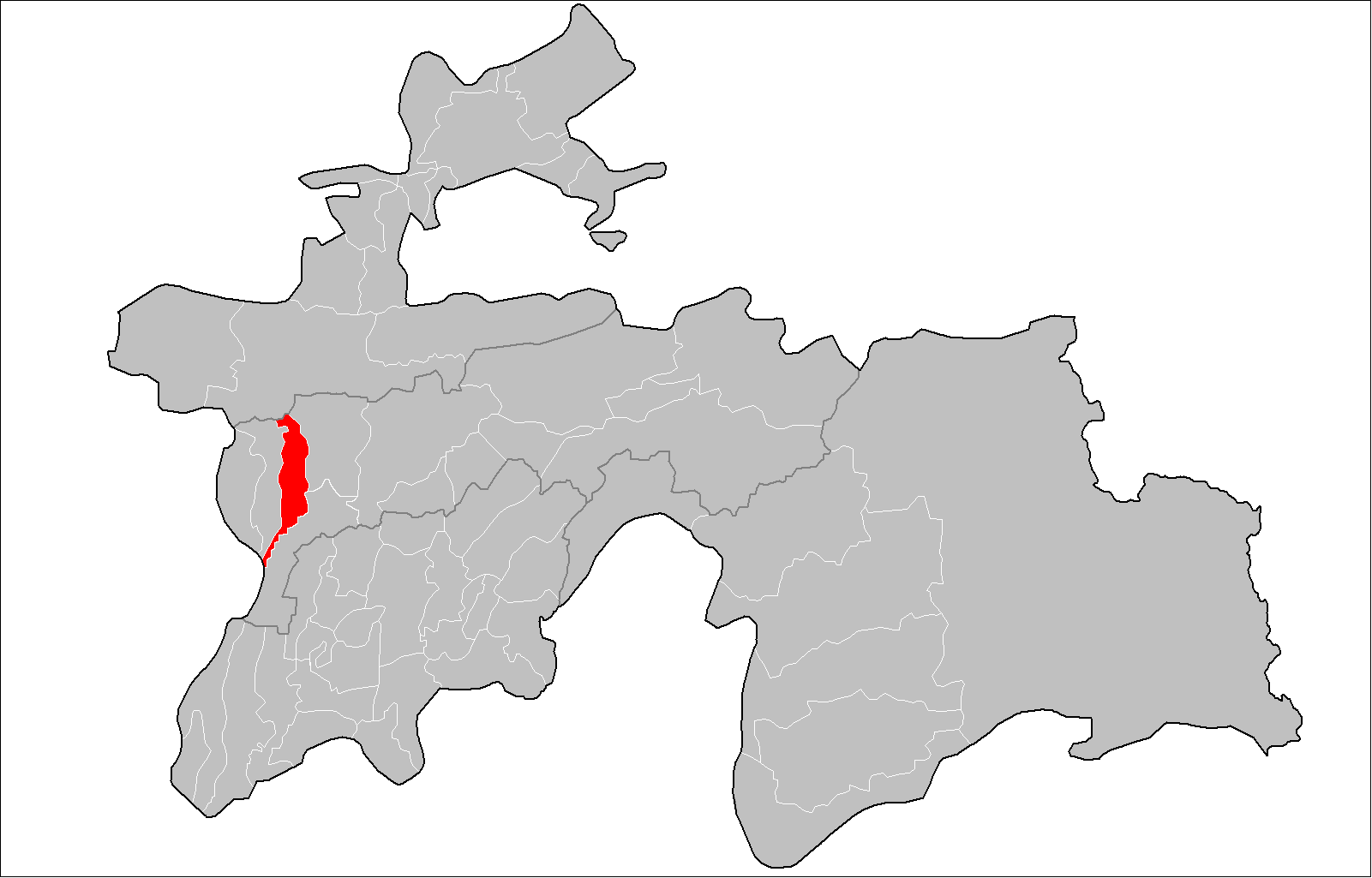
Location in Tajikistan

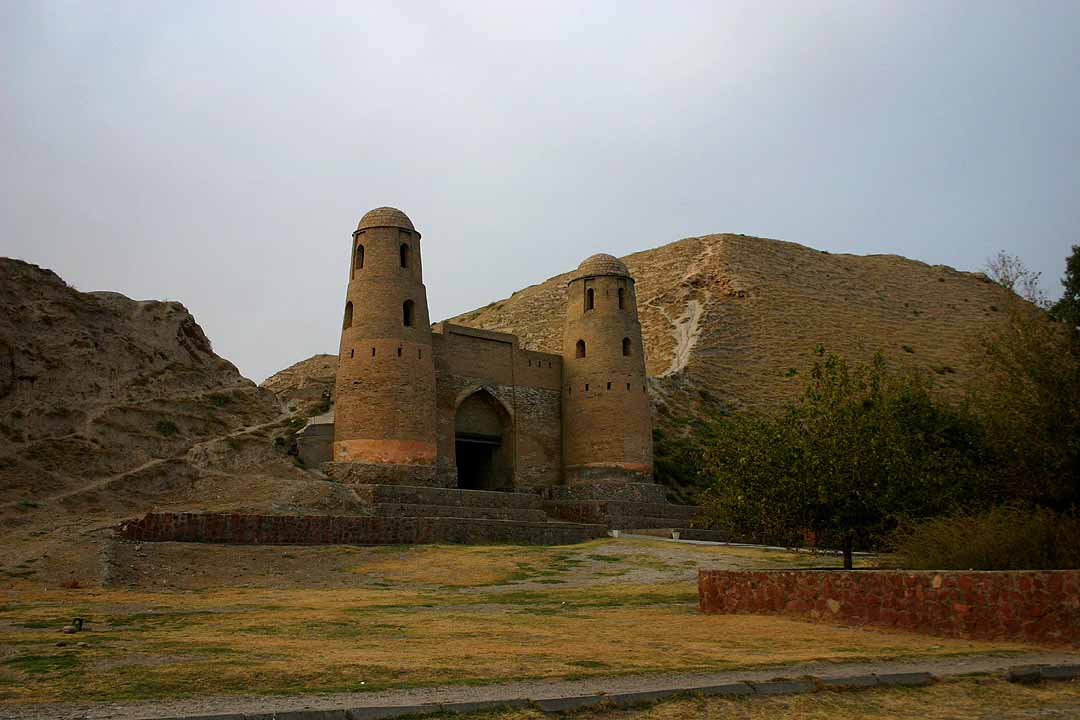
An old castle in Hisor before renovations

Hisar District (also transliterated as Hissar, Gissar) (Tajik: Ноҳияи Ҳисор, romanized: Nohiya‘i Hisor/Nohijaji Hisor) is a former district in the Region of Republican Subordination, in Tajikistan, located west of the capital Dushanbe, between Varzob District in the east and Shahrinav District in the west. Its capital Hisar is a town of 50,000 people about 10 km west of Dushanbe, at the center of the fertile Hisar Valley. Around 2018, the district was merged into the city of Hisar.

== Administrative divisions ==
The district was divided administratively into jamoats. They were as follows (and population).

Jamoats of Hisor District
Jamoat	Population
Almosi	15029
Dehqonobod	13698
Durbat	14136
Hisor	20524
Mirzo Tursunzoda	15152
Somon	20500
Khonakohikuhi	20392
Mirzo Rizo	18538
Navobod	19496
Sharora	8291

== See also ==
- Hisar Air Base
