= Navobod =

Navobod may refer to one of several locations in Tajikistan:

- Navobod, Hisor, a jamoat in the city of Hisor, Districts of Republican Subordination Region
- Navobod, Istaravshan, a village in the city of Istaravshan, Sughd Region
- Navobod, Panjakent, a village in the city of Panjakent, Sughd Region
- Navobod, Qubodiyon District, a jamoat in Qubodiyon District, Khatlon Region
- Navobod, Rasht District, a jamoat in Districts of Republican Subordination Region
- Navobod, Jaloliddin Balkhi District, a jamoat in Jaloliddin Balkhi District, Khatlon Region
- Navobod, Tursunzoda, a jamoat in the city of Tursunzoda, Districts of Republican Subordination Region
