= Boghi Kalon =

- Location in Tajikistan
- Coordinates: 39°53′10″N 68°59′11″E
- Country: Tajikistan
- Region: Sughd Region
- City: Istaravshan

Boghi Kalon (Tajik: Боғи Калон) is a village in the Republic of Tajikistan. It is part of the city of Istaravshan in Sughd Region.

== Location ==
Bogi Kalon is situated in the region of Sughd. Sughd's capital, Khujand, is roughly 70 km / 43 mi away from Bogi Kalon. The distance from Bogi Kalon to Tajikistan's capital, Dushanbe, is approximately 152 km / 94 mi. The terrain height above sea level is said to be approximately 1024 meters.

== Geographic coordinates of Bogi Kalon ==
The location is at a latitude of 39.8892° and a longitude of 68.9886°, with an altitude of 3,382 ft (1,030m). In degrees, minutes, and seconds (DMS), the coordinates are 39° 53' 21" N latitude and 68° 59' 19" E longitude. Distances from Bogi Kalon to the equator (0° lat) is 4,423 km north, and to the prime meridian (0° long) is 5,742 km east.

== Population ==
Boghi Kalon, located in Tajikistan, is a small village, and detailed population data are not readily available. But Tajikistan population is roughly approximated to be 9,313,800 people in 2020 and 10,273,000 in 2024, 74% of which live in rural areas.

== Places near by Boghi kalon ==
West : Saksiyon (0.8 nm), Tapkok (1.6 nm), Ak-Guaz-Kaaz (2.2 nm), Almaly (3.7 nm).

North: Bobotago (1.1 nm), Istaravshan (1.6 nm), Vogat (3.5 nm), Khuzya (4.7 nm), Rugund (5.1 nm).

East : Poshkent (1.9 nm), Qal'achai Gulizard (2.5 nm).

South : Objuvoz (1.4 nm), Nafaroch (3.5 nm), Obkarchagay (3.5 nm), Chavkandak (3.3 nm), Dalyon (3.7 nm), Dahyak (3.9 nm), Karasakol (4.0 nm), Dahyak (4.2 nm).
