= Nofaroj =

- Jamoat
- Location in Tajikistan
- Coordinates: 39°49′N 68°59′E
- Country: Tajikistan
- Region: Sughd Region
- City: Istaravshan

Population (2015)
  - Total: 10,875
- Time zone: UTC+5 (TJT)

Nofaroj is a village and jamoat located in north-western Tajikistan. It is part of the city of Istaravshan in Sughd Region. As of 2015, The jamoat has a total population of 10,875. It consists of 10 villages, including Obkarchaghay (the administrative seat), Dahyak, Navobod, Nofaroj, Qadamjo and Sughdiyona.
