= Sharifov =

Sharifov (Azerbaijani: Şərifov; Tajik: Шарифов) is a surname found among traditionally Muslim ethnic groups in the former Soviet Union, slavicised from Sharif. Its feminine form is Sharifova (Azerbaijani: Şərifova; Tajik: Шарифова). Notable people with the surname include:

- Abid Sharifov (born 1940), Azerbaijani politician
- Aytaj Sharifova (born 1997), Azerbaijani footballer
- Firangiz Sharifova (1924–2014), Azerbaijani actress
- Homiddin Sharifov (1947–2007), Tajikistani politician
- Samir Sharifov (born 1961), Azerbaijani politician
- Sharif Sharifov (born 1988), Azerbaijani wrestler

== See also ==
- Sharipov (surname), a similarly-derived surname
