= Guli Surkh =

- Jamoat
- Location in Tajikistan
- Coordinates: 39°57′N 68°56′E
- Country: Tajikistan
- Region: Sughd Region
- City: Istaravshan

Population (2015)
  - Total: 42,582
- Time zone: UTC+5 (TJT)

Guli Surkh (Tajik: Гули Сурх) is a jamoat in north-western Tajikistan. It is part of the city of Istaravshan in Sughd Region. The jamoat has a total population of 42,582 (2015). It consists of 15 villages, including Guliston (the seat), Bobotago, Bodomzor (formerly: Tapkok) and Bogikalon.
