= Iftikhor =

Iftikhor Ифтихор (Russian and Tajik)
- Jamoat
- Location in Tajikistan
- Coordinates: 40°42′N 70°39′E
- Country: Tajikistan
- Region: Sughd Region
- District: Asht District

Population (2015)
  - Total: 11,201
- Time zone: UTC+5 (TJT)

Location of Asht District in Tajikistan

Iftikhor (Tajik: Ифтихор, formerly Kirkkuduk) is a jamoat in north-west Tajikistan. It is located in Asht District in Sughd Region. The jamoat has a total population of 11,201 (2015). It consists of 7 villages, including Iftikhor (the seat) and Kattasarqamish.
