= Oshoba =

Oshoba Ошоба (Russian and Tajik)
- Village and jamoat
- Location in Tajikistan
- Coordinates: 40°44′05″N 70°26′30″E
- Country: Tajikistan
- Region: Sughd Region
- District: Asht District

Population (2015)
  - Total: 21,260
- Time zone: UTC+5 (TJT)
- Official languages: Russian (Interethnic); Tajik (State) (Note: Constitution of Tajikistan)

Oshoba (Russian and Tajik: Ошоба) is a village and jamoat in north-west Tajikistan. It is located in Asht District in Sughd Region. The jamoat has a total population of 21,260 (2015). It consists of 14 villages, including Oshoba (the seat) and Gudos.
