= Zarhalol =

Zarhalol Russian: Зархалол Tajik: Зарҳалол
- Jamoat
- Location in Tajikistan
- Coordinates: 40°04′N 69°00′E
- Country: Tajikistan
- Region: Sughd Region
- City: Istaravshan

Population (2015)
  - Total: 30,683
- Time zone: UTC+5 (TJT)
- Official languages: Russian (Interethnic); Tajik (State)

Zarhalol (Tajik: Зарҳалол, [zærɦæˈlɑl]), formerly known as Kommunizm (Tajik: Коммунизм, [kəmuˈnʲizəm]) in the USSR, is a jamoat in north-western Tajikistan. It is part of the city of Istaravshan in Sughd Region. The jamoat has a total population of 30,683 (2015). It consists of 12 villages, including Istaravshan (the seat), Navkat and Oboddara.
