= Dodkhudoev =

Dodkhudoev (feminine: Dodkhudoeva) is a Tajik surname. Notable people with the surname include:

- Larisa Dodkhudoeva (born 1947), Tajikistani historian
- Lola Dodkhudoeva (born 1951), Tajikistani historian
- Nazarsho Dodkhudoyev (1915–2000), Soviet Tajik politician
