= Ponghoz =

Ponghoz Russian: Пангаз Tajik: Понғоз
- Village and jamoat
- Location in Tajikistan
- Coordinates: 40°45′N 70°15′E
- Country: Tajikistan
- Region: Sughd Region
- District: Asht District

Population (2015)
  - Total: 28,352
- Time zone: UTC+5 (TJT)
- Official languages: Russian (Interethnic); Tajik (State) (Note: Constitution of Tajikistan)

Ponghoz (Tajik: Понғоз) or Pangaz (Russian: Пангаз) is a village and jamoat in north-west Tajikistan. It is located in Asht District in Sughd Region. The jamoat has a total population of 28,352 (2015). It consists of 7 villages, including Ponghoz (the seat) and Bobodarkhon.
