= Sabriston =

Sabriston Сабристон (Russian and Tajik)
- Jamoat
- Location in Tajikistan
- Coordinates: 40°03′N 68°57′E
- Country: Tajikistan
- Region: Sughd Region
- City: Istaravshan

Population (2015)
  - Total: 16,822
- Time zone: UTC+5 (TJT)
- Official languages: Russian (Interethnic); Tajik (State)

Sabriston (Tajik: Сабристон, formerly: Frunze) is a jamoat in north-western Tajikistan. It is part of the city of Istaravshan in Sughd Region. The jamoat has a total population of 16,822 (2015). It consists of 3 villages: Rugund (the seat), Vogat and Yakkatol.
