= Qalailabiob =

- Village and Jamoat
- Location within Tajikistan
- Coordinates: 39°07′30″N 70°50′30″E
- Country: Tajikistan
- Region: Districts of Republican Subordination
- District: Tojikobod District

Population (2015)
  - Total: 11,102
- Time zone: UTC+5 (TJT)
- Official languages: Russian (Interethnic); Tajik (State) (Note: Constitution of Tajikistan)

Qalailabiob (Russian: Калаи-Лабиоб; Tajik: Қалъаи Лабиоб Qal'ai Labiob, Persian: قلعه لب آب) is a village and jamoat in Tajikistan. It is located in Tojikobod District, one of the Districts of Republican Subordination. The jamoat has a total population of 11,102 (2015). The jamoat includes the village Tojikobod, the seat of the district, and 10 other villages.
