= Qal'achai Kalon =

- Jamoat
- Location in Tajikistan
- Coordinates: 39°52′N 69°01′E
- Country: Tajikistan
- Region: Sughd Region
- City: Istaravshan

Population (2015)
  - Total: 15,433
- Time zone: UTC+5 (TJT)
- Official languages: Russian (Interethnic); Tajik (State)

Qal'achai Kalon or Kalachai-Kalon (Russian: Калачаи-Калон; Tajik: Қалъачаи Калон), formerly known as Pravda (Tajik: Правда), is a village and jamoat in north-western Tajikistan. It is part of the city of Istaravshan in Sughd Region. The jamoat has a total population of 15,433 (2015).
