= Mehrobod =

Mehrobod Russian: Мехрабад Tajik: Меҳробод
- Town and Jamoat
- Location in Tajikistan
- Coordinates: 40°10′N 69°30′E
- Country: Tajikistan
- Region: Sughd Region
- District: Jabbor Rasulov District

Population (2020)
  - Total: 16,600
- Time zone: UTC+5 (TJT)

Jabbor Rasulov District on a map of Tajikistan

Mehrobod (Russian: Мехрабад; Tajik: Меҳробод, formerly: Proletarsk) is a town and jamoat in Tajikistan. It is the administrative capital of Jabbor Rasulov District in Sughd Region, located just south of the regional capital of Khujand and south-west of the cities of Buston and Ghafurov.

The population of Mehrobod on January 1, 2020 was estimated at 16,600.

== See also ==
- List of cities in Tajikistan
