= Chorbogh, Sughd =

Chorbogh Russian: Чорбог Tajik: Чорбоғ Ленинобод (formerly)
- Village and Jamoat
- Location in Tajikistan
- Coordinates: 39°52′N 69°05′E
- Country: Tajikistan
- Region: Sughd Region
- City: Istaravshan

Population (2015)
  - Total: 16,488
- Time zone: UTC+5 (TJT)
- Official languages: Russian (Interethnic); Tajik (State)

Chorbogh (Tajik: Чорбоғ, formerly Leninobod) is a village and jamoat in north-western Tajikistan. It is part of the city of Istaravshan in Sughd Region. The jamoat has a total population of 16,488 (2015).
