= Safar Amirshoev (jamoat) =

- Jamoat
- Location within Tajikistan
- Coordinates: 38°19′N 69°45′E
- Country: Tajikistan
- Region: Khatlon Region
- District: Baljuvon District

Population (2015)
  - Total: 5,785
- Time zone: UTC+5 (TJT)
- Official languages: Russian (Interethnic); Tajik (State) (Note: Constitution of Tajikistan)

Safar Amirshoev (Russian and Tajik: Сафар Амиршоев, formerly Satalmush) is a jamoat in Tajikistan. It is located in Baljuvon District in Khatlon Region. The jamoat has a total population of 5,785 (2015).
