= Somon =

Somon may refer to:

- Sōmon, the outer gate of a Japanese Buddhist temple
- Somon, Tajikistan, an administrative division in Tajikistan
- Sum (administrative division)
