= Sayf Rahim =

- Jamoat
- Location within Tajikistan
- Coordinates: 38°13′N 69°47′E
- Country: Tajikistan
- Region: Khatlon Region
- District: Baljuvon District

Population (2015)
  - Total: 7,305
- Time zone: UTC+5 (TJT)
- Official languages: Russian (Interethnic); Tajik (State) (Note: Constitution of Tajikistan)

Sayf Rahim (Russian: Сайф Рахим; Tajik: Сайф Раҳим, formerly Dektur) is a jamoat in Tajikistan. It is located in Baljuvon District in Khatlon Region. The jamoat has a total population of 7,305 (2015).
