= Gulkhona =

Gulkhona Гулхона
- Village and Jamoat
- Location in Tajikistan
- Coordinates: 40°08′N 69°30′E
- Country: Tajikistan
- Region: Sughd Region
- District: Jabbor Rasulov District

Population (2015)
  - Total: 24,077
- Time zone: UTC+5 (TJT)

Gulkhona (Tajik: Гулхона) is a village and jamoat in western Tajikistan. It is located in Jabbor Rasulov District in Sughd Region. The jamoat has a total population of 24,077 (2015). It consists of 11 villages, including Gulkhona (the seat) and Lolazor (formerly: Kayragach).

== Name ==
Gulkhona in Persian means place of flowers. Gol means flower, Khana/Khona means place/house.
