= Yakkatol =

Yakkatol Яккатол
- Location in Tajikistan
- Coordinates: 39°58′N 68°59′E
- Country: Tajikistan
- Region: Sughd Region
- City: Istaravshan
- Official languages: Russian (Interethnic); Tajik (State)

Yakkatol (Russian and Tajik: Яккатол) is a village in Sughd Region, northern Tajikistan. It is part of the jamoat Sabriston in the city of Istaravshan.

It is located along the M34 highway.
