= Oboddara =

Uyas
- Location in Tajikistan
- Coordinates: 40°5′30″N 69°2′7″E
- Country: Tajikistan
- Region: Sughd Region
- City: Istaravshan
- Official languages: Russian (Interethnic); Tajik (State) (Note: Constitution of Tajikistan)

Oboddara (Russian and Tajik: Ободдара, formerly Uyas) is a village in Sughd Region, northern Tajikistan. It is part of the jamoat Zarhalol in the city of Istaravshan.
