= Hayoti Nav =

- Town and Jamoat
- Location in Tajikistan
- Coordinates: 39°58′N 69°29′E
- Country: Tajikistan
- Region: Sughd Region
- District: Jabbor Rasulov District

Population (2015)
  - Total: 14,037
- Time zone: UTC+5 (TJT)

Hayoti Nav (Tajik: Ҳаёти Нав, formerly: Yangihayot) is a village and jamoat in western Tajikistan. It is located in Jabbor Rasulov District in Sughd Region. The jamoat has a total population of 14,037 (2015).
