= Zarafshon, Tojikobod District =

Zarafshon Зарафшон
- Jamoat
- Location within Tajikistan
- Coordinates: 39°08′N 70°53′E
- Country: Tajikistan
- Region: Districts of Republican Subordination
- District: Tojikobod District

Population (2015)
  - Total: 5,162
- Time zone: UTC+5 (TJT)
- Official languages: Russian (Interethnic); Tajik (State)

Zarafshon (formerly Munavvarsho Shogadoev; Tajik: Зарафшон) is a jamoat in Tajikistan. It is located in Tojikobod District, one of the Districts of Republican Subordination. The jamoat has a total population of 5,162 (2015). Villages: Shing, Zafarobod (the seat), Guliston, Safedoron, Shahriston.
