= Langarishoh =

- Village and Jamoat
- Location within Tajikistan
- Coordinates: 39°03′N 70°40′E
- Country: Tajikistan
- Region: Districts of Republican Subordination
- District: Tojikobod District

Population (2015)
  - Total: 10,360
- Time zone: UTC+5 (TJT)

Langarishoh (Tajik: Лангаришоҳ, Persian: لشگر شاه) is a village and jamoat in Tajikistan. It is located in Tojikobod District, one of the Districts of Republican Subordination. The jamoat has a total population of 10,360 (2015).
