= Oriyon =

Oriyon Ориён (Russian and Tajik)
- Village and jamoat
- Location in Tajikistan
- Coordinates: 40°43′N 70°43′E
- Country: Tajikistan
- Region: Sughd Region
- District: Asht District

Population (2015)
  - Total: 17,487
- Time zone: UTC+5 (TJT)
- Official languages: Russian (Interethnic); Tajik (State) (Note: Constitution of Tajikistan)

Oriyon (Russian and Tajik: Ориён, formerly Jarbulak) is a village and jamoat in north-west Tajikistan. It is located in Asht District in Sughd Region. The jamoat has a total population of 17,487 (2015).
