= Asht (jamoat) =

Asht Ашт (Russian and Tajik)
- Jamoat
- Interactive map of Asht
- Coordinates: 40°51′N 70°31′E
- Country: Tajikistan
- Region: Sughd Region
- District: Asht District

Population (2015)
  - Total: 21,409
- Time zone: UTC+5 (TJT)

Asht is a jamoat in the Asht District, Sughd Region of Tajikistan. According to the January 2015 census, the population of Asht was 21,409 at the time.
