= Qadamjo =

- Location in Tajikistan
- Coordinates: 39°49′22″N 68°58′18″E
- Country: Tajikistan
- Region: Sughd Region
- City: Istaravshan
- Official languages: Russian (Interethnic); Tajik (State) (Note: Constitution of Tajikistan)

Qadamjo (Russian: Кадамджо; Tajik: Қадамҷо, formerly Karasakol) is a village in Sughd Region, northern Tajikistan. It is part of the jamoat Nofaroj in the city of Istaravshan. It is located along the M34 highway.
