= Tojikiston, Baljuvon District =

Tojikiston Таджикистанский/Тоджикистанский джамоат Деҳоти Тоҷикистон
- Jamoat
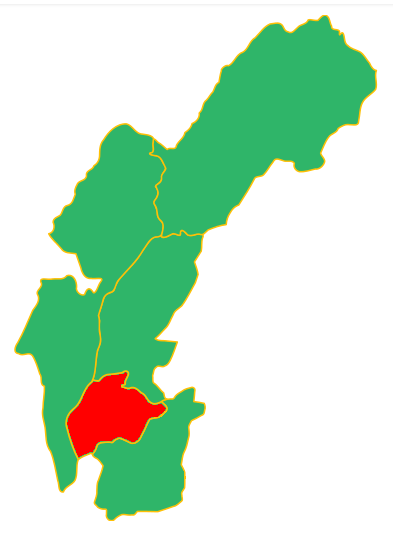
- Map of Baljuvon District with Tojikiston highlighted

- Location within Tajikistan
- Coordinates: 38°17′N 69°42′E
- Country: Tajikistan
- Region: Khatlon
- District: Baljuvon District

Population (2015)
  - Total: 5,474
- Time zone: UTC+5 (TJT)
- Official languages: Russian (Interethnic); Tajik (State)

Tojikiston is a jamoat in Tajikistan. It is located in Baljuvon District in Khatlon Region. The jamoat has a total population of 5,474 (2015).
