= Nurafshon, Lakhsh District =

Nurafshon
- Jamoat
- Нурафшон
- Location within Tajikistan
- Coordinates: 39°15′N 71°14′E
- Country: Tajikistan
- Region: Districts of Republican Subordination
- District: Lakhsh District

Population (2015)
  - Total: 6,442
- Time zone: UTC+5 (TJT)
- Official languages: Russian (Interethnic); Tajik (State)

Nurafshon (Tajik: Нурафшон, Russian: Нурафшон, formerly Yangishahr) is a jamoat in Tajikistan. It is located in Lakhsh District, one of the Districts of Republican Subordination. The jamoat has a total population of 6,442 (2015). Villages: Khurramshahr (the seat), Safedjar, Safedorak, Balkh, Yormazor, Korvonguzar, Dulona, Zarbogh.
