= Qalaibaland =

- Jamoat
- Location in Tajikistan
- Coordinates: 39°51′N 69°01′E
- Country: Tajikistan
- Region: Sughd Region
- City: Istaravshan

Population (2015)
  - Total: 9,820
- Time zone: UTC+5 (TJT)
- Official languages: Russian (Interethnic); Tajik (State) (Note: Constitution of Tajikistan)

Qalaibaland is a village and jamoat in north-western Tajikistan. It is part of the city of Istaravshan in Sughd Region. The jamoat has a total population of 9,820 (2015).
