= Bobotago =

- Location in Tajikistan
- Coordinates: 39°54′26″N 68°58′39″E
- Country: Tajikistan
- Region: Sughd Region
- City: Istaravshan

Bobotago (Tajik: Боботағо, Bobotagho) is a village in Sughd Region, northern Tajikistan. It is part of the Jamoat, Guli Surkh in the city of Istaravshan.
