= Rahimzoda =

- Jamoat
- Location within Tajikistan
- Coordinates: 39°02′N 70°12′E
- Country: Tajikistan
- Region: Districts of Republican Subordination
- District: Rasht District

Population (2015)
  - Total: 12,114
- Time zone: UTC+5 (TJT)
- Official languages: Russian (Interethnic); Tajik (State) (Note: Constitution of Tajikistan)

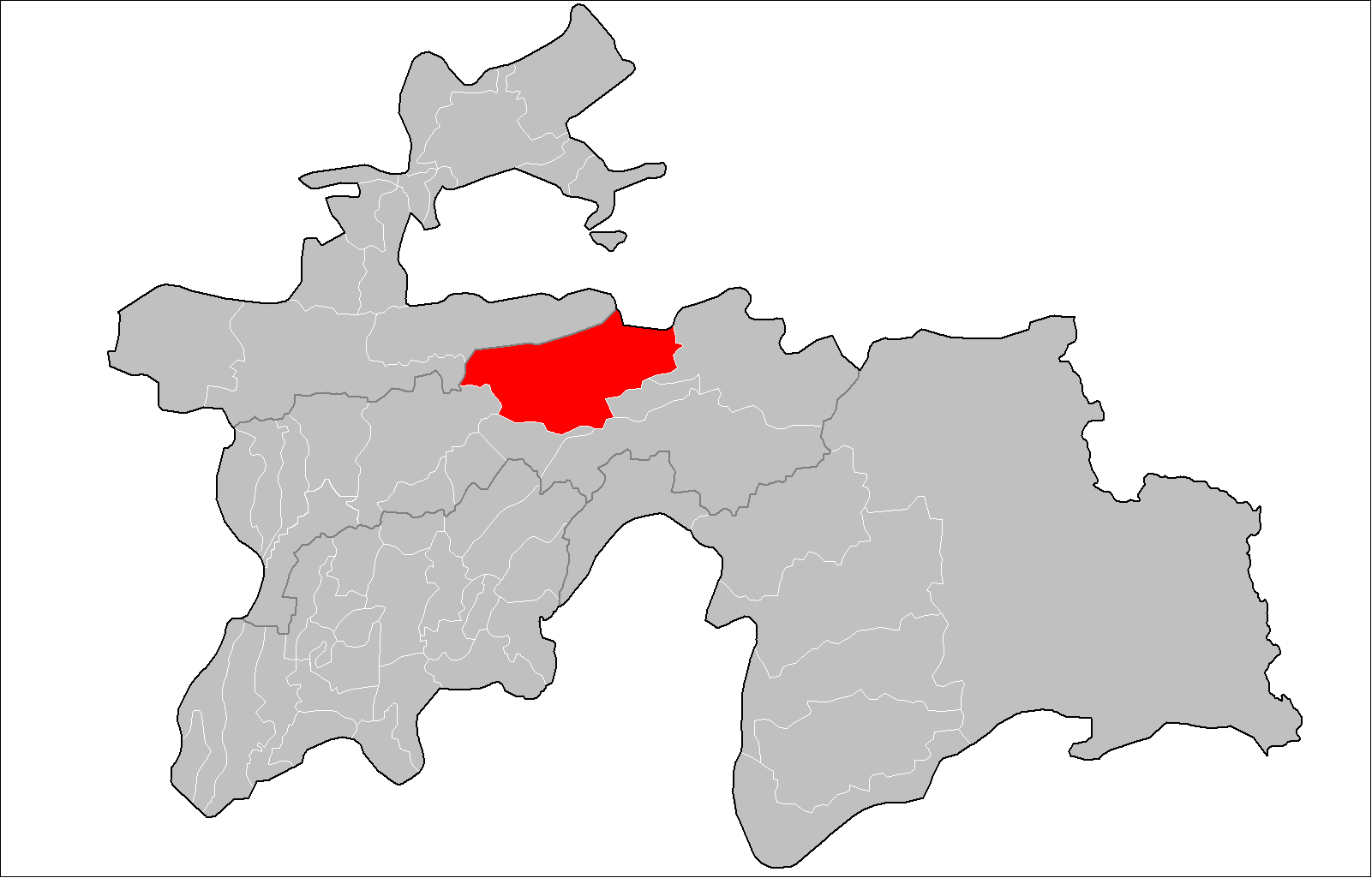
Location of Rasht District in Tajikistan

Rahimzoda (Russian: Рахимзода; Tajik: Раҳимзода, Persian: رحیم‌زاده) is a jamoat in Tajikistan. It is located in Rasht District, one of the Districts of Republican Subordination. The jamoat has a total population of 12,114 (2015). It consists of 24 villages, including Sangi Maliki (the seat) and Shule.
