= Shodoba =

Shodoba Шодоба (Russian and Tajik)
- Jamoat
- Interactive map of Shodoba
- Coordinates: 40°37′N 70°28′E
- Country: Tajikistan
- Region: Sughd Region
- District: Asht District

Population (2015)
  - Total: 8,990
- Time zone: UTC+5 (TJT)

Shodoba is a jamoat in the Asht District, Sughd Region of Tajikistan. As the January 2015 census, the population of Shodoba was 8,990.
