= Navkat, Istaravshan =

Navkat
- Location in Tajikistan
- Coordinates: 40°2′N 69°4′E
- Country: Tajikistan
- Region: Sughd Region
- City: Istaravshan

Navkat (Tajik: Навкат, formerly Uyali) is a village in Sughd Region, northern Tajikistan. It is part of the jamoat Zarhalol in the city of Istaravshan.
