= Sarikhosor =

- Village and Jamoat
- Location within Tajikistan
- Coordinates: 38°32′N 69°50′E
- Country: Tajikistan
- Region: Khatlon Region
- District: Baljuvon District

Population (2015)
  - Total: 5,894
- Time zone: UTC+5 (TJT)
- Official languages: Russian (Interethnic); Tajik (State) (Note: Constitution of Tajikistan)

Sarikhosor (Russian and Tajik: Сарихосор, Persian: ساری‌حصار) is a village and jamoat in Tajikistan. It is located in Baljuvon District in Khatlon Region. The jamoat has a total population of 5,894 (2015).
