= Sughdiyona =

- Location in Tajikistan
- Coordinates: 39°43′N 68°55′E
- Country: Tajikistan
- Region: Sughd Region
- City: Istaravshan
- Official languages: Russian (Interethnic); Tajik (State)

Sughdiyona (Tajik: Суғдиёна) also Sogdiana (Russian: Согдиана) — formerly Karmysh or Qarmishi tojik — is a village in Sughd Region, northern Tajikistan. It is part of the jamoat Nofaroj in the city of Istaravshan.
