= Bodomzor, Tajikistan =

Village in Sughd Region, Tajikistan

Bodomzor
- Location in Tajikistan
- Coordinates: 39°53′N 68°57′E
- Country: Tajikistan
- Region: Sughd Region
- City: Istaravshan

Bodomzor (Tajik: Бодомзор, formerly Tapkok) is a village in Sughd Region, northern Tajikistan. It is part of the jamoat Guli Surkh in the city of Istaravshan.
