= Shirinchashma =

- Village and Jamoat
- Location within Tajikistan
- Coordinates: 39°05′N 70°53′E
- Country: Tajikistan
- Region: Districts of Republican Subordination
- District: Tojikobod District

Area
  - Total: 84.2 km^{2} (32.5 sq mi)

Population
  - Total: 4,573
- Time zone: UTC+5 (TJT)

Shirinchashma (Tajik: Ширинчашма) is a village and jamoat in Tajikistan. It is located in Tojikobod District, one of the Districts of Republican Subordination. Its population is 4,573 and its area is 84.2 km^{2}.
