= Shule, Tajikistan =

Shule Шуле
- Location in Tajikistan
- Coordinates: 39°05′00″N 70°12′20″E
- Country: Tajikistan
- Region: Districts of Republican Subordination
- District: Rasht District
- Official languages: Russian (Interethnic); Tajik (State)

Shule (Russian and Tajik: Шуле) is a village in central Tajikistan. It is part of the jamoat Rahimzoda in Rasht District, one of the Districts of Republican Subordination. Shule is 9 km northeast of the town Navobod.
