= Bobodarkhon =

- Location in Tajikistan
- Coordinates: 40°43′N 70°15′E
- Country: Tajikistan
- Region: Sughd Region
- District: Asht District

Bobodarkhon (Tajik: Бободархон) is a village in Sughd Region, northern Tajikistan. It is part of the jamoat Ponghoz in Asht District.
