= Baljuvon =

- Village and Jamoat
- Location in Tajikistan
- Coordinates: 38°18′30″N 69°40′35″E
- Country: Tajikistan
- Region: Khatlon Region
- District: Baljuvon District
- Elevation: 911 m (2,989 ft)

Population (2015)
  - Total: 6,041
- Time zone: UTC+5 (TJT)

Baljuvon is a village and jamoat in Tajikistan. It is located in Baljuvon District in Khatlon Region. The jamoat has a total population of 6,041 (2015).

== Climate ==
Climate data for Baljuvon
| Month | Jan | Feb | Mar | Apr | May | Jun | Jul | Aug | Sep | Oct | Nov | Dec | Year |
|---|---|---|---|---|---|---|---|---|---|---|---|---|---|
| Mean daily maximum °C (°F) | 5.5 (41.9) | 7.7 (45.9) | 13.5 (56.3) | 20.5 (68.9) | 25.7 (78.3) | 32.1 (89.8) | 34.8 (94.6) | 33.9 (93.0) | 29.1 (84.4) | 21.9 (71.4) | 14.0 (57.2) | 7.9 (46.2) | 20.6 (69.0) |
| Mean daily minimum °C (°F) | −3.7 (25.3) | −1.9 (28.6) | 3.3 (37.9) | 8.7 (47.7) | 12.0 (53.6) | 15.8 (60.4) | 17.9 (64.2) | 16.3 (61.3) | 11.3 (52.3) | 6.9 (44.4) | 2.1 (35.8) | −1.2 (29.8) | 7.3 (45.1) |
| Average precipitation mm (inches) | — | 77 (3.0) | 115 (4.5) | 95 (3.7) | 82 (3.2) | 11 (0.4) | 5 (0.2) | 1 (0.0) | 2 (0.1) | 33 (1.3) | 40 (1.6) | 57 (2.2) | 580 (22.8) |
Source: Climate-data.org
