= Nijoni =

- Jamoat
- Location in Tajikistan
- Coordinates: 39°58′N 68°55′E
- Country: Tajikistan
- Region: Sughd Region
- City: Istaravshan

Population (2015)
  - Total: 10,350
- Time zone: UTC+5 (TJT)

Nijoni is a village and jamoat in north-western Tajikistan. It is part of the city of Istaravshan in Sughd Region. The jamoat has a total population of 10,350 (2015).
