= Tojikobod =

Tojikobod Тоҷикобод
- Location in Tajikistan
- Coordinates: 39.117°N 70.847°E
- Country: Tajikistan
- Region: Districts of Republican Subordination
- District: Tojikobod District

Tojikobod (Tajik: Тоҷикобод, Russian: Таджикабад Tadzhikabad) is a village in central Tajikistan. It is the seat of Tojikobod District, one of the Districts of Republican Subordination.

Tojikobod is in the Vakhsh river valley and has a Köppen climate classification of Dsa and experiences wet and cold winters with dry cool summers. The town is both a river crossing and highway junction. It is part of the jamoat of Qalailabiob.

It has an elevation of 351 meters.
