= Somoniyon, Sughd =

Ӯзбекқишлоқ
- Village and Jamoat
- Location in Tajikistan
- Coordinates: 40°8′38″N 69°32′49″E
- Country: Tajikistan
- Region: Sughd Region
- District: Jabbor Rasulov District

Population
  - Total: 16,321
- Time zone: UTC+5 (TJT)
- Official languages: RussianUZBEK (Interethnic); Tajik (State)

Somoniyon (Russian: Сомониён; Tajik: Сомониён, formerly: Uzbekqishloq (Russian: Узбеккишлак; Uzbek: ЎЗБЕКҚИШЛОҚ, romanized: O’zbekqishloq)) is a village and jamoat in western Tajikistan. It is located in Jabbor Rasulov District in Sughd Region. The jamoat has a total population of 12,577.
