= Jabbor Rasulov District =

Jabbor Rasulov District Tajik: Ноҳияи Ҷаббор Расулов
- District
- Location of Jabbor Rasulov District in Tajikistan
- Coordinates: 40°05′N 69°30′E
- Country: Tajikistan
- Region: Sughd Region
- Capital: Mehrobod

Area
  - Total: 300 km^{2} (120 sq mi)

Population (2020)
  - Total: 137,700
  - Density: 460/km^{2} (1,200/sq mi)
- Time zone: UTC+5 (TJT)

Jabbor Rasulov District (Tajik: Ноҳияи Ҷаббор Расулов Nohiyai Jabbor Rasulov) is a district in Sughd Region, Tajikistan. Its capital is Mehrobod (former Proletarsk). The population of the district is 137,700 (January 2020 estimate).

== Administrative divisions ==
The district has an area of about 300 km^{2} (100 sq mi) and is divided administratively into one town and five jamoats. They are as follows:

Jamoat	Population (Jan. 2015)
Mehrobod (town)	14,800
Dehmoy	14,802
Ghulakandoz	39,006
Gulkhona	24,077
Hayoti Nav	14,037
Somoniyon	18,278
