= Rarz =

- Village and Jamoat
- Location in Tajikistan
- Coordinates: 39°22′49″N 68°44′39″E
- Country: Tajikistan
- Region: Sughd Region
- District: Ayni District

Population (2015)
  - Total: 8,998
- Time zone: UTC+5 (TJT)
- Official languages: Russian (Interethnic); Tajik (State) (Note: Constitution of Tajikistan)

Rarz is a village and jamoat in north-west Tajikistan. It is located in Ayni District in Sughd Region. The jamoat has a total population of 8,998 (2015). It consists of 9 villages, including Rarz (the seat), Fatmev, Fatmovut, Guzaribad and Ispan.
