= Alichur =

- Village and Jamoat
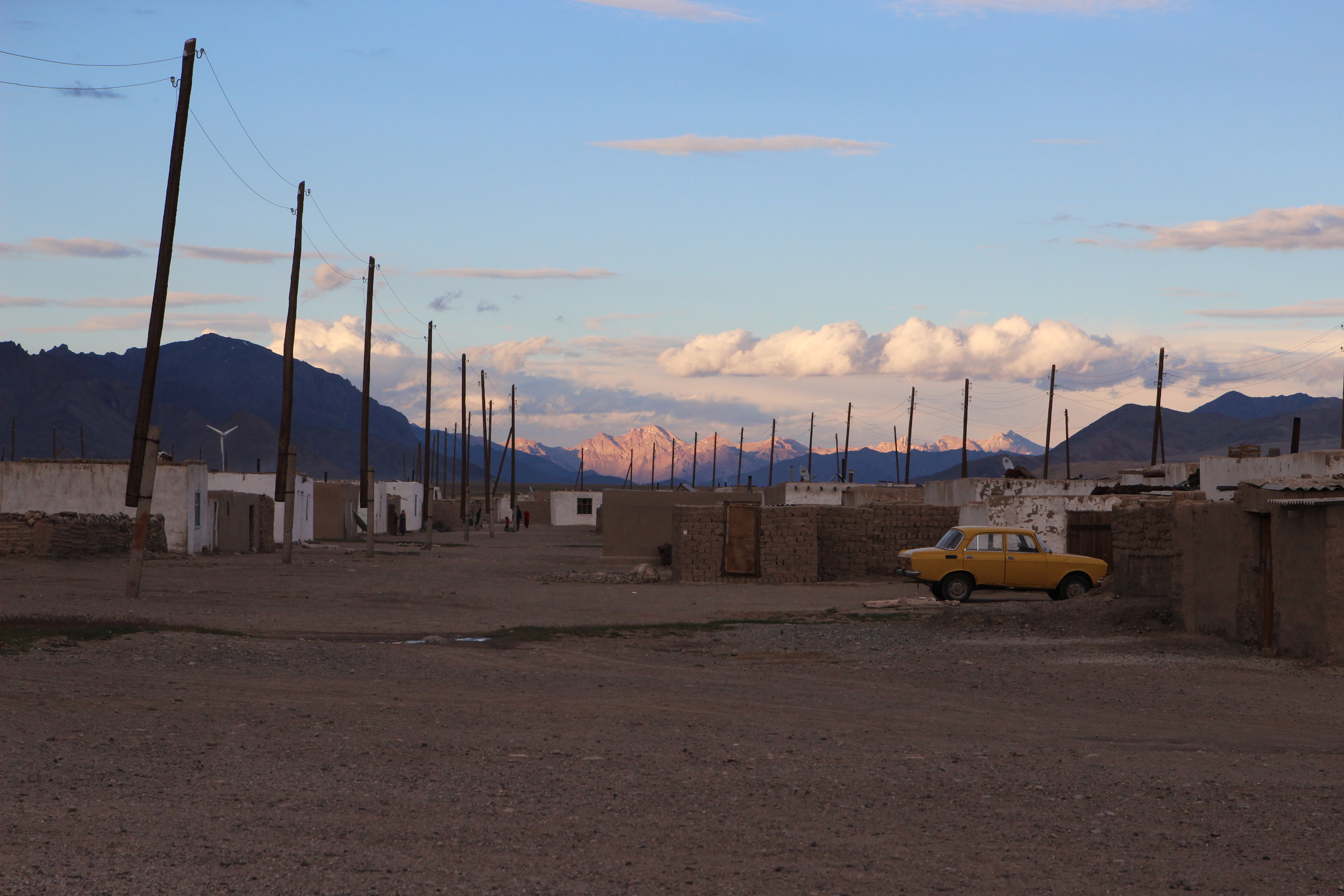

- Location in Tajikistan
- Coordinates: 37°45′N 73°16′E
- Country: Tajikistan
- Region: Gorno-Badakhshan Autonomous Region
- District: Murghob District
- Elevation: 3,880 m (12,730 ft)

Population (2015)
  - Total: 2,242
- Time zone: UTC+5 (TJT)

Alichur is a jamoat (municipality) and village in Murghob District, Gorno-Badakhshan Autonomous Region, Tajikistan. The population of the jamoat is 2,422 (2015). The name of the village means Ali's curse and is reputed to have been spoken by the prophet's son-in-law Ali on a journey through the area, on account of the harsh climate and penetrating winds there.

== Government ==
As of September 2017, the leader of the community was Mahan Atabaev, a poacher turned conservationist.

== Ecology ==
Alichur is participating in a community-based ecological management program called the Burgut conservancy, in an attempt to reverse the depopulation of ibex, bears, Marco Polo sheep and lynx.

== Economy ==
The community generates income from commercial hunting, and intends to expand into eco-tourism.

== Education ==
Alichur has a village school.
