= Javkandak =

- Jamoat
- Location in Tajikistan
- Coordinates: 39°54′N 68°56′E
- Country: Tajikistan
- Region: Sughd Region
- City: Istaravshan

Population (2015)
  - Total: 10,200
- Time zone: UTC+5 (TJT)

Javkandak is a village and jamoat in north-western Tajikistan. It is part of the city of Istaravshan in Sughd Region. The jamoat has a total population of 10,200 (2015).
