= Mu'minobod =

Mu'minobod Мӯъминобод
- Location within Tajikistan
- Coordinates: 38°06′30″N 70°01′45″E
- Country: Tajikistan
- Region: Khatlon
- District: Mu'minobod

Population (2020)
  - Total: 14,100
- Time zone: UTC+5 (Tajikistan Time)
  - Summer (DST): UTC+5 (Tajikistan Time)
- Post index: 735365
- Website: www.muminobod.tj

Mu'minobod (Tajik: Мӯъминобод), previously known as Muminabad (Russian: Муминабад), Leningradskiy or Leningrad (Tajik: Ленинград) is a settlement in south Tajikistan. It is the administrative capital of the Mu'minobod District in the eastern part of Khatlon Province, located north-east of the city of Kulob, not far from the Panj River and the international border with Afghanistan. The population of the town is 14,100 (January 2020 estimate).

== Population ==
The population of Mu'minobod is yearly estimated by the State Committee of Statistics,

Year	1970	1979	1989	2013	2015
Population	12 625	6920	9764	12 700	13 000

== Infrastructure ==
South of Mu'minobod, there is a reservoir, storing water for irrigation. It is released in late summer, beginning of autumn.

== Culture ==
=== Museum ===
The town has a town museum.

=== Mosques ===
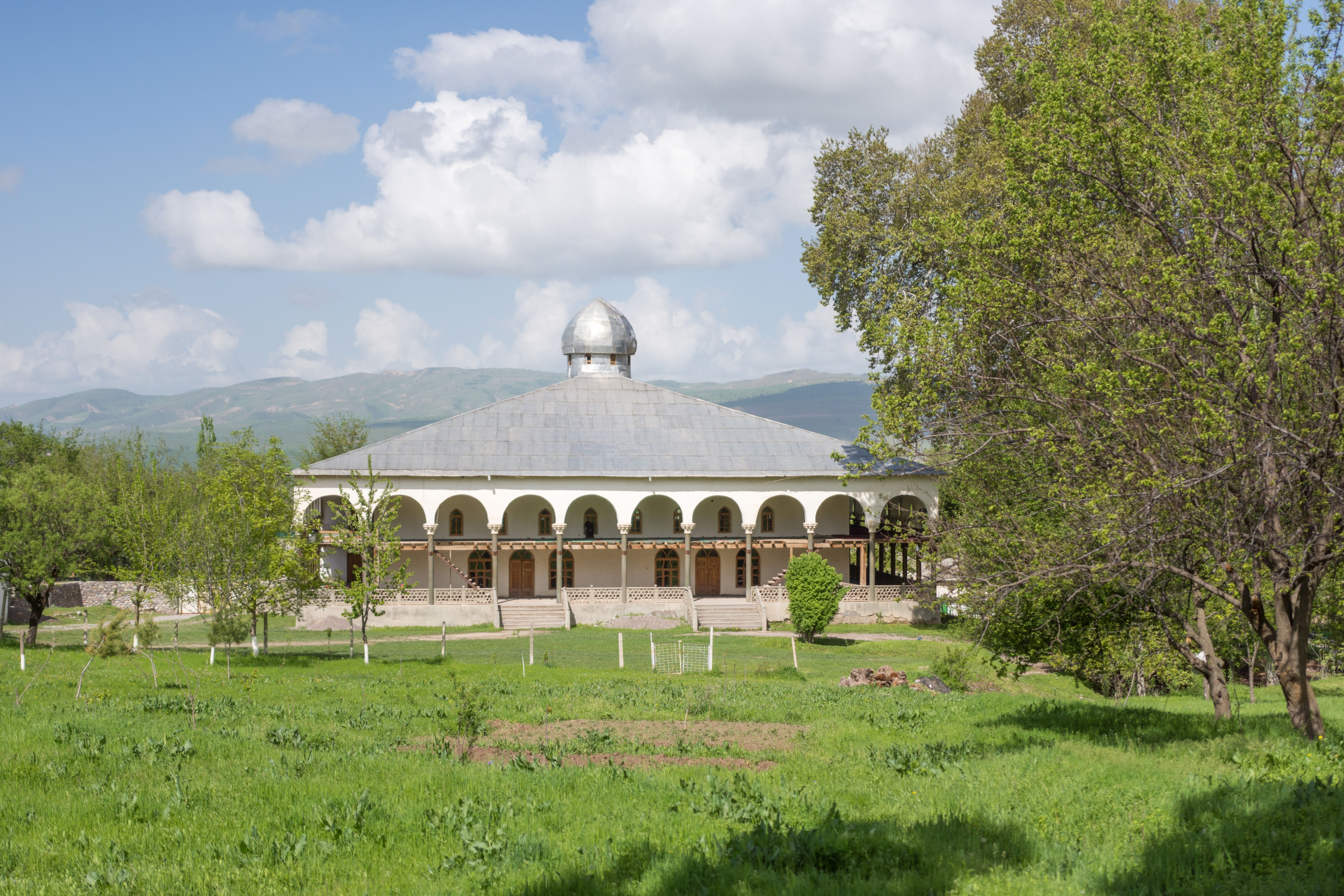
Grand Mosque of Mu'minobod

The Grand Mosque is located centrally in a park.

=== Sport ===
In the Stadium of Mu'minobod, many sporting events are carried out, and holidays are celebrated.

=== Memorials and Statues ===
Various statues and memorials are placed in the city centre, mainly to remember national events and personalities.

==== World War II memorial ====
The memorial park in remembrance of the heroes of the Second World War features a fountain.

==== Goat statue ====
The goat statue at the entrance of town was removed in 2018, after residents complained being called to live in "that goat place".

==== Somoni statue ====
Ismoil Somoni, is remembered by an equestrian statue right in the middle of town.

==== Lenin statue ====
The head of Lenin rests on a pedestal in front of a building opposite the postal office.

==== Constitution memorial ====
At the traffic light, where the road to Childuxtaron departs from the one leading to the market, there is a memorial of the Constitution of Tajikistan.

== Transport ==
Although there is no official public transport, the town can be reached in 45 minutes by a shared car from Kulob for 10 somoni (2017).

Ahead of a visit by the president, the first traffic light was installed in the middle of town.

== Tourism ==
A scenic place, one hour by car North-West of town, is the Childuxtaron Nature Reserve.

== Services ==
There is a post office in town.

== Climate ==
Mu'minobod has a hot, dry-summer continental climate (Köppen climate classification Dsa). The average annual temperature is 9.7 °C (49.5 °F). The warmest month is July with an average temperature of 22.2 °C (72.0 °F) and the coolest month is January with an average temperature of -4.0 °C (24.8 °F). The average annual precipitation is 767.1 mm (30.2") and has an average of 78.3 days with precipitation. The wettest month is March with an average of 137.2 mm (5.4") of precipitation and the driest month is August with an average of 2.5 mm (0.1") of precipitation.

Climate data for Mu'minobod
Month	Jan	Feb	Mar	Apr	May	Jun	Jul	Aug	Sep	Oct	Nov	Dec	Year
Daily mean °C (°F)	−4 (25)	−1.9 (28.6)	3.8 (38.8)	10.5 (50.9)	14.3 (57.7)	19 (66)	22.2 (72.0)	21.3 (70.3)	16.4 (61.5)	10.7 (51.3)	4.6 (40.3)	−0.4 (31.3)	9.7 (49.5)
Average precipitation mm (inches)	79.7 (3.14)	97.7 (3.85)	137.7 (5.42)	132.7 (5.22)	110.3 (4.34)	22.8 (0.90)	9.8 (0.39)	2 (0.1)	2.8 (0.11)	44.5 (1.75)	56.3 (2.22)	71.7 (2.82)	768 (30.2)
Average precipitation days (≥ 0.1 mm)	7.2	9	12.1	12.4	11	4.2	2.4	0.8	1.3	4.9	5.7	7.3	78.3
Average relative humidity (%)	70.6	70	66.2	63.2	57.9	42.9	36.1	36.2	39.6	49.4	58.8	66.4	54.8
Source: "The Climate of Mu'minobod, Tajikistan". Weatherbase.

== See also ==
- List of cities in Tajikistan
