= Kattasarqamish =

- Location in Tajikistan
- Coordinates: 40°46′N 70°34′E
- Country: Tajikistan
- Region: Sughd Region
- District: Asht District

Kattasarqamish (Tajik: Каттасарқамиш) is a village in far northern Tajikistan. It is located in Asht District, Sughd Region.
