= Tojikobod District =

Tojikobod District (Russian: Таджикабадский район) (Tajik: Ноҳияи Тоҷикобод)
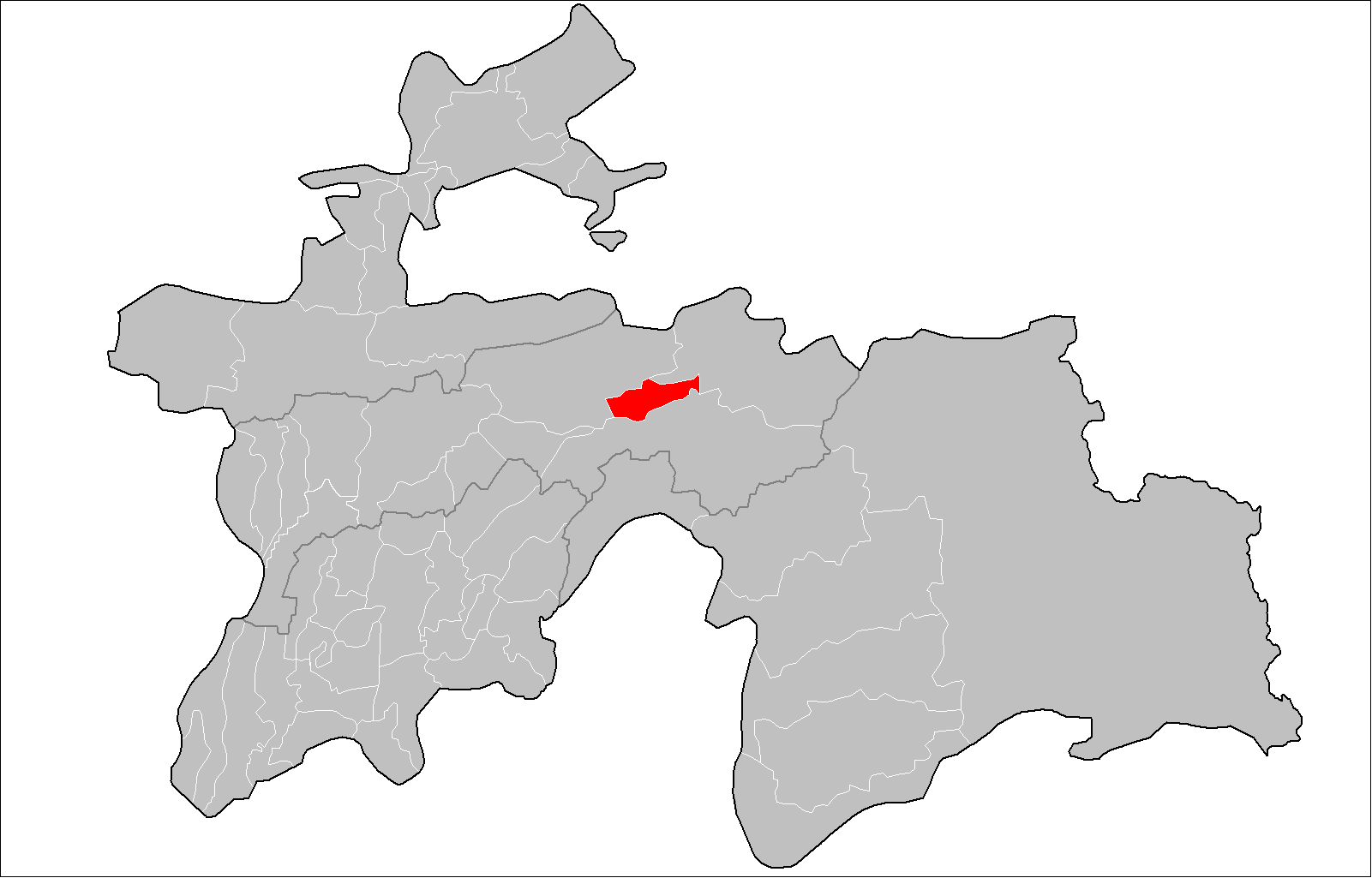
- Location of the district in Tajikistan
- Coordinates: 39°05′N 70°50′E
- Country: Tajikistan
- Region: Districts of Republican Subordination
- Capital: Tojikobod

Area
  - Total: 700 km^{2} (270 sq mi)

Population (2020)
  - Total: 46,000
  - Density: 66/km^{2} (170/sq mi)
- Time zone: UTC+5
- Official languages: Russian (Interethnic); Tajik (State)
- Website: tojikobod.tj

Tojikobod District (Tajik: Ноҳияи Тоҷикобод, romanized: Nohiyai Tojikobod) or Tajikabad District Russian: Таджикабад, romanized: Tadzhikabad) is a district in Tajikistan, one of the Districts of Republican Subordination. It is surrounded by Sangvor District from the south, Lakhsh District from the north-east, and Rasht District from the north-west. Its capital is the village Tojikobod. The population of the district is 46,000 (January 2020 estimate).

== Administrative divisions ==
The district has an area of about 700 km^{2} (300 sq mi) and is divided administratively into five jamoats. They are as follows:

Jamoat	Population (Jan. 2015)
Langarisho	10,360
Nushor	11,608
Qalailabiob	11,102
Shirinchashma	2,968
Shogadoev	5,162
