= Vogat =

- Location in Tajikistan
- Coordinates: 39°56′19″N 68°59′11″E
- Country: Tajikistan
- Region: Sughd Region
- City: Istaravshan
- Official languages: Russian (Interethnic); Tajik (State)

Vogat (Russian and Tajik: Вогат) is a village in Sughd Region, northern Tajikistan. It is part of the jamoat Sabriston in the city of Istaravshan. It is located on the M34 highway.
