= Navobod, Istaravshan =

Navobod
- Location in Tajikistan
- Coordinates: 39°43′N 68°57′E
- Country: Tajikistan
- Region: Sughd Region
- City: Istaravshan

Navobod (Tajik: Навобод) is a village in Sughd Region, northern Tajikistan. It is part of the jamoat Nofaroj in the city of Istaravshan.
