= Poshkent =

Poshkent Пошкент
- Jamoat
- Location in Tajikistan
- Coordinates: 39°53′N 69°02′E
- Country: Tajikistan
- Region: Sughd Region
- City: Istaravshan

Population
  - Total: 19,746
- Time zone: UTC+5 (TJT)
- Official languages: Russian (Interethnic); Tajik (State) (Note: Constitution of Tajikistan)

Location of the Istarawshan District

Poshkent (Russian and Tajik: Пошкент) is a village and jamoat in north-western Tajikistan. It is part of the city of Istaravshan in Sughd Region. The jamoat has a total population of 19,746 (2015).
