= Ispan =

- Location in Tajikistan
- Coordinates: 39°24′37″N 68°41′55″E
- Country: Tajikistan
- Region: Sughd Region
- District: Ayni District

Ispan (Tajik: Испағн Ispaghn) is a village in Sughd Region, northern Tajikistan. It is part of the jamoat Rarz in the Ayni District.
