= Mu'minobod District =

Mu'minobod District (Russian: Муминабадский район) Ноҳияи Мӯъминобод
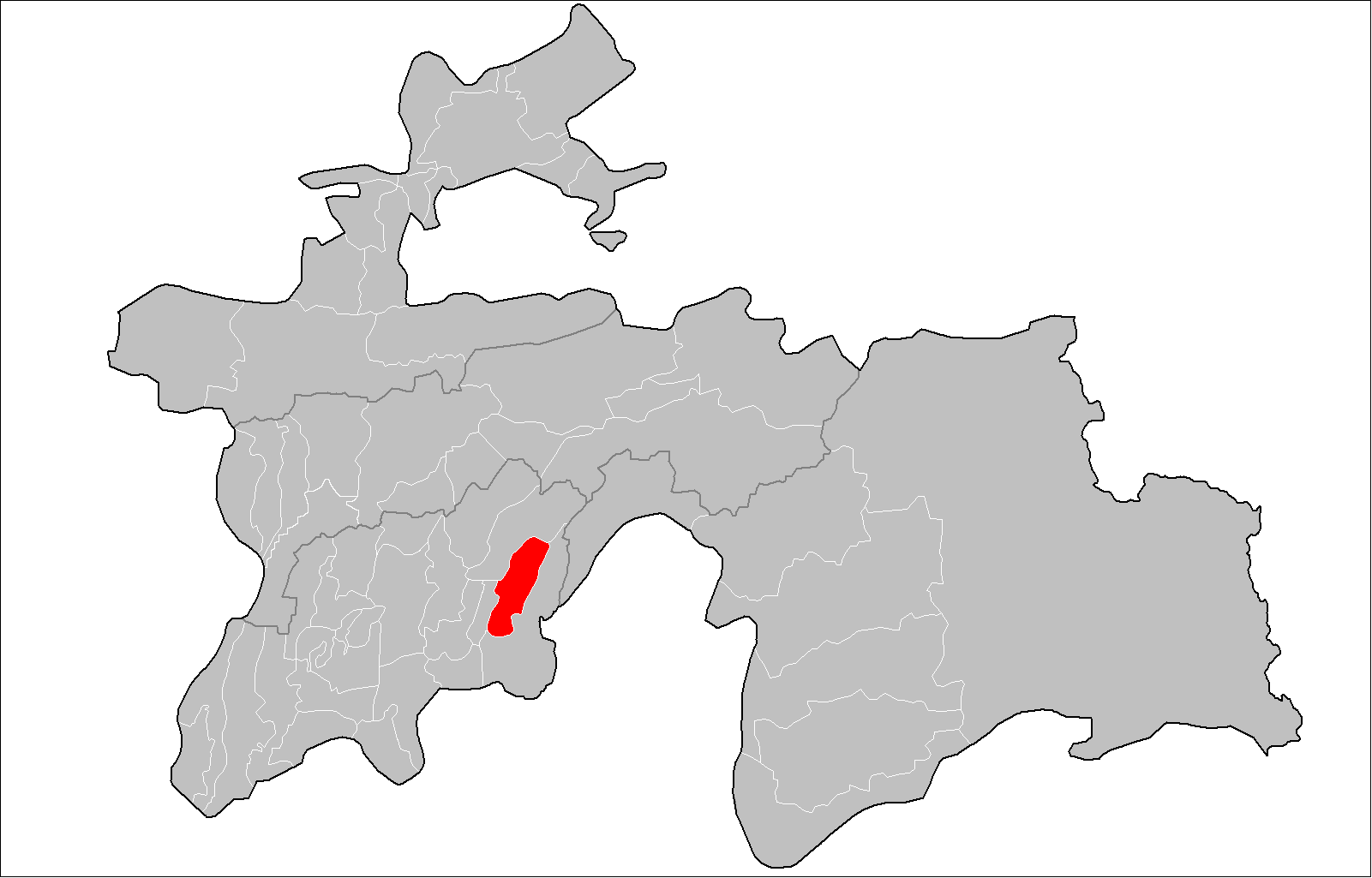
- Coordinates: 38°06′N 70°02′E
- Country: Tajikistan
- Region: Khatlon
- Capital: Mu'minobod

Area
  - Total: 900 km^{2} (350 sq mi)

Population (2020)
  - Total: 94,700
  - Density: 110/km^{2} (270/sq mi)
- Time zone: UTC+5
  - Summer (DST): UTC+5
- Website: muminobod.tj

Mu'minobod District or Nohiya-i Mu'minobod (Tajik: Ноҳияи Мӯъминобод) is a district in Khatlon Region, Tajikistan. Its capital is Mu'minobod, also known in Soviet times, from 1973 − 1991, as Leningradskiy. The population of the district is 94,700 (January 2020 estimate).

== Administrative divisions ==
The district has an area of about 900 km^{2} (300 sq mi) and is divided administratively into one town and six jamoats. They are as follows:

Jamoat	Population (Jan. 2015)
Mu'minobod (town)	13,000
Balkhobi	12,590
Boghgay	13,053
Childukhtaron	
Dehibaland	14,363
Nuralisho Nazarov	18,733
Shamsiddin Shohin	10,850

== Geography ==
This district is situated in the mountainous southeastern part of Khatlon Region, and is bordering Afghanistan. The district spans 2,387 square kilometers.

== History ==
The district was established in 1973 within Kulob Oblast.
