= Fatmev =

- Location in Tajikistan
- Coordinates: 39°23′46″N 68°41′7″E
- Country: Tajikistan
- Region: Sughd Region
- District: Ayni District

Fatmev (Tajik: Фатмев) is a village in Sughd Region, northern Tajikistan. It is part of the jamoat Rarz in the Ayni District. It is located along the river Zeravshan.
