= Ghulakandoz =

Gulakandoz Ғӯлакандоз
- Village and jamoat
- Location in Tajikistan
- Coordinates: 40°9′42″N 69°28′4″E
- Country: Tajikistan
- Region: Sughd Region
- District: Jabbor Rasulov District

Population (2022)
  - Total: 50,200
- Time zone: UTC+5
- Postal code: 735420

Gulakandoz (Tajik: Ғӯлакандоз) is a village and jamoat in the northwestern part of Tajikistan, located in the Jabbor Rasulov District of the Sughd Region. As of 2022, the jamoat has an estimated population of 50,200.

Previously recorded as having 39,006 inhabitants in 2015, Gulakandoz has experienced notable population growth over the past decade.

Geographically, Gulakandoz is surrounded by hills and mountains on three sides, providing a scenic and naturally protected environment. The jamoat comprises six villages: Bakhtovar (Иторчи), Gulakandoz (the central and largest settlement), Zarkhez (locally known as Олмабароз), Nurafzo (Оқтеппа), Samiev, Sokiak

These villages form a cohesive community, with Gulakandoz serving as the administrative and cultural hub.
