= Gudos =

- Location in Tajikistan
- Coordinates: 40°48′N 70°30′E
- Country: Tajikistan
- Region: Sughd Region
- District: Asht District

Gudos is a village in far northern Tajikistan. It is located in Asht District in Sughd Region.
