= Khovaling =

Khovaling Ховалинг
- Location within Tajikistan
- Coordinates: 38°20′19″N 69°58′22″E
- Country: Tajikistan
- Region: Khatlon
- District: Khovaling District

Population (1 January 2015)
  - Total: 10,601
- Official languages: Russian (Interethnic); Tajik (State)

Khovaling (Tajik: Ховалинг), formerly known as Khwalung, is a village and jamoat in Tajikistan. It is the seat of the Khovaling District of the Khatlon Region. The jamoat had a total population of 10,601 as of 2015.

== History ==
During the early modern period, Khovaling formed part of the territory of the lord of Kulob, typically subservient to or allied with the Emirate of Bukhara. In 1861, it was the site of the arrest of the British and Kokandi agent Abdul Mejid and his party on their return trip to British Peshawar. Owing to reports of chaos in Bukhara following the deposition of the emir Muhammad Nasrullah Bahadur, however, the Kolubi khan Surrah Khan released the party with presents, entertainment, and good wishes in order to maintain better relations with the other states.
