= Guzaribad =

- Location in Tajikistan
- Coordinates: 39°23′13″N 68°42′21″E
- Country: Tajikistan
- Region: Sughd Region
- District: Ayni District

Guzaribad (Tajik: Гузарибод Guzaribod) is a village in Sughd Region, northern Tajikistan. It is part of the jamoat Rarz in the Ayni District.
