= Fatmovut =

- Location in Tajikistan
- Coordinates: 39°22′16″N 68°50′22″E
- Country: Tajikistan
- Region: Sughd Region
- District: Ayni District

Fatmovut (Tajik: Фатмовут) is a village in Sughd Region, northern Tajikistan. It is part of the jamoat Rarz in the Ayni District.
