= Khovaling District =

Khovaling District Russian: Ховалингский район Tajik: Ноҳияи Ховалинг
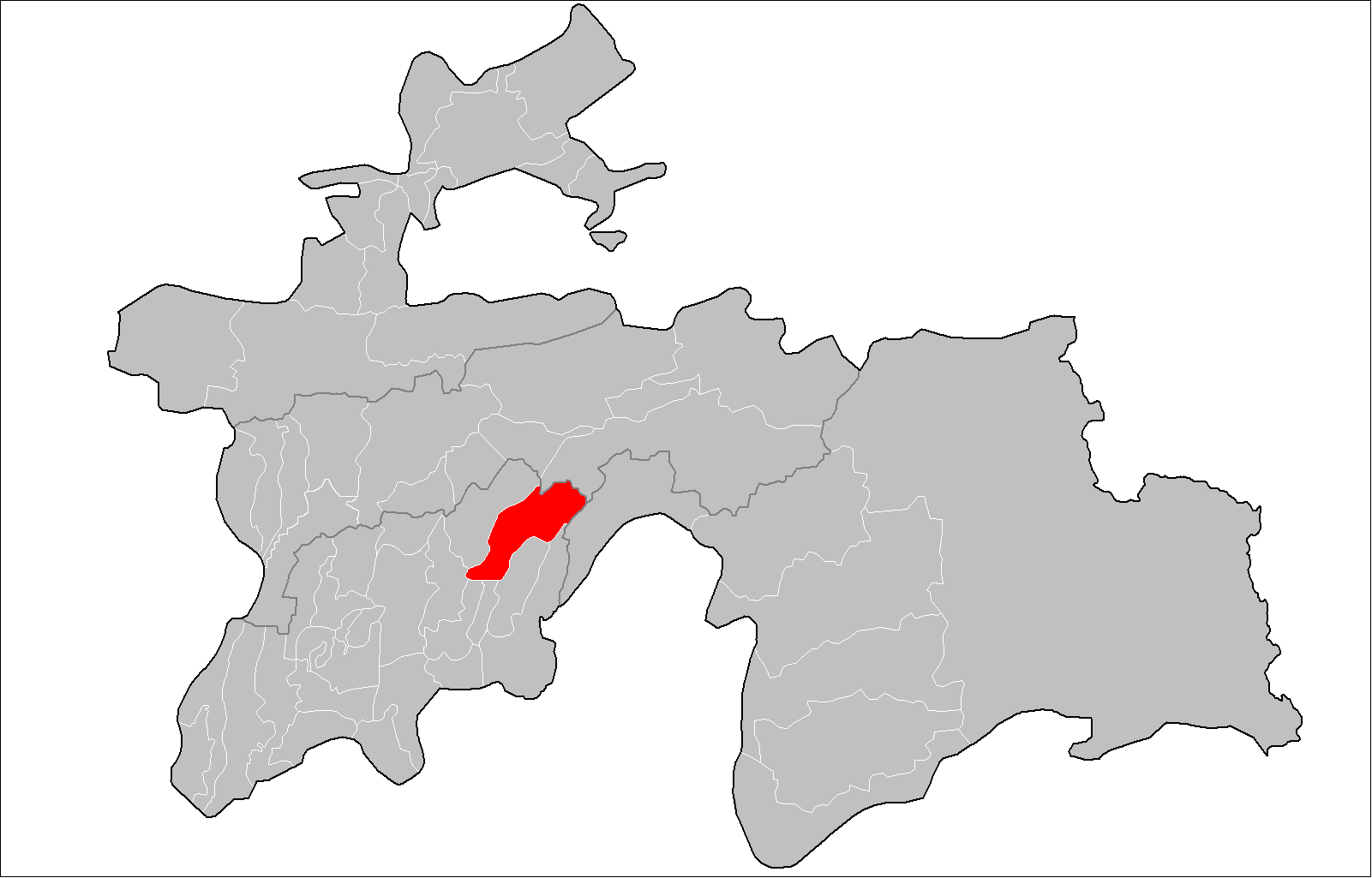
- Location of the district in Tajikistan
- Coordinates: 38°20′N 70°00′E
- Country: Tajikistan
- Region: Khatlon Region
- Capital: Khovaling

Area
  - Total: 1,700 km^{2} (660 sq mi)

Population (2020)
  - Total: 57,900
  - Density: 34/km^{2} (88/sq mi)
- Time zone: UTC+5
- Official languages: Russian (Interethnic); Tajik (State)
- Website: khovaling.tj

Khovaling District or Nohiya-i Khovaling (Russian: Ховалингский район; Tajik: Ноҳияи Ховалинг) is a district in Khatlon Region, Tajikistan. Its capital is the village Khovaling. The population of the district is 57,900 (January 2020 estimate).

== Administrative divisions ==
The district has an area of about 1,700 km^{2} (700 sq mi) and is divided administratively into five jamoats. They are as follows:

Jamoat	Population (Jan. 2015)
Ghaffor Mirzo (Sariosiyob)	8,806
Jombakht	13,662
Khovaling	10,601
Lohuti	12,732
Shugnov	7,666
