= Lola Dodkhudoeva =

Tajikistani historian (born 1951)

- Born: 1951 (age 74–75); Dushanbe, Tajikistan
- Occupation: Historian
- Relatives: Nazarsho Dodkhudoyev (father); Larisa Dodkhudoeva (sister)

Academic background
- Education: Leningrad State University; Tajik Academy of Sciences (PhD)
- Thesis: Epigraphic Monuments of Samarqand, XI–XIV Centuries (1983)

Lola Dodkhudoeva (born 1951) is a Tajikistani historian.

Born in Dushanbe, Dodkhudoeva is the daughter of Nazarsho Dodkhudoyev; Her sister is the art historian Larisa Dodkhudoeva. She received a degree in Arabic studies from Leningrad State University in 1973. In 1977 she began work as a researcher at the Department of Medieval History of the Institute of History, Ethnography, and Archaeology at the Tajik Academy of Sciences; she later became the head of the department. She received her Ph.D. in 1983 from the Tajik Academy of Sciences. From 1993 to 1994 she worked in the Tajikistan Ministry of Education; from 1996 to 1997 she was the deputy director of the Open Society Institute's branch in the country. In March 2000 she was named secretary general of UNESCO's national commission for Tajikistan. Dodkhudoeva is by specialty a historian of Islam, focusing on the religion's role in medieval Central Asian affairs, with some forays into more contemporary topics. As of 2016 she was a chief scholar of the Rudaki Institute of Language, Literature, Oriental Studies and Written Heritage at the Tajikistan Academy of Sciences.
