= Navobod, Hisor =

Navobod
- Village and Jamoat
- Location within Tajikistan
- Coordinates: 38°34′N 68°31′E
- Country: Tajikistan
- Region: Districts of Republican Subordination
- City: Hisor

Population (2015)
  - Total: 26,321
- Time zone: UTC+5 (TJT)

Navobod (Tajik: Навобод, Russian: Навобод) is a village and jamoat in Tajikistan. It is part of the city of Hisor in Districts of Republican Subordination. The jamoat has a total population of 26,321 (2015).
