= Mirzo Tursunzoda, Hisor =

Mirzo Tursunzoda
- Jamoat
- Location within Tajikistan
- Coordinates: 38°31′N 68°31′E
- Country: Tajikistan
- Region: Districts of Republican Subordination
- City: Hisor

Population (2015)
  - Total: 20,303
- Time zone: UTC+5 (TJT)

Mirzo Tursunzoda (Tajik: Мирзо Турсунзода, Russian: Мирзо Турсунзаде, formerly Karamkul) is a jamoat in Tajikistan. It is part of the city of Hisor in Districts of Republican Subordination. The jamoat has a total population of 20,303 (2015).
