= Mirzo Rizo =

- Jamoat
- Location within Tajikistan
- Coordinates: 38°34′N 68°28′E
- Country: Tajikistan
- Region: Districts of Republican Subordination
- City: Hisor

Population (2015)
  - Total: 25,971
- Time zone: UTC+5 (TJT)

Mirzo Rizo (Tajik: Мирзо Ризо, Russian: Мирза Реза) is a jamoat in Tajikistan. It is part of the city of Hisor in Districts of Republican Subordination. The jamoat has a total population of 31,826 (2020; 25,971 — 2015)
