= Larisa Dodkhudoeva =

Tajikistani art historian (born 1947)

Larisa Nazarovna Dodkhudoeva
- Born: 1947 (age 78–79); Dushanbe, Tajik SSR, USSR
- Citizenship: Tajik
- Occupation: Art historian
- Relatives: Nazarsho Dodkhudoyev (father); Lola Dodkhudoeva (sister)

Academic background
- Education: Repin Institute of Arts; Institute of Oriental Studies

Academic work
- Institutions: Tajikistan Academy of Sciences; Institute of World Economy and International Relations
- Notable works: Tajik Artists, Nizami Poems in Medieval Persian Miniature Painting, Art of Books in Central Asia and India in the Sixteenth to Nineteenth Centuries

Larisa Nazarovna Dodkhudoeva (born 1947) is a Tajikistani art historian.

== Biography ==
Born in Dushanbe, Dodkhudoeva is the daughter of politician Nazarsho Dodkhudoyev; her sister, Lola is a historian of some repute. She graduated from the Repin Institute in Leningrad in 1970. Eight years later, she received a doctorate in Islamic culture from the Institute of Oriental Studies of the USSR Academy of Sciences. In 1988, she received another doctorate, this one in history, from the Institute of History, Archaeology and Ethnography of the Tajikistan Academy of Sciences.

She began her academic career as a researcher at the Institute in 1970. She later rose to become head of the Department of South Asia at the Institute of World Economy and International Relations from 1993 until 1996, and from then until 2000, she was Deputy Director of the same Institute. More recently, she has served as Chief Researcher in the Institute of History, Archaeology and Ethnography of the Tajikistan Academy of Sciences, where she has also headed the ethnographic department.

During her career, Dodkhudoeva has received recognition from numerous international institutions. In 1999, she was awarded a certificate by the University of Nebraska–Lincoln for involvement in peace and reconciliation in Tajikistan. In 2001, she received an award from the Central European University for her cultural work. She has also received numerous grants from various entities during her career. She is a past member of the Institute for Advanced Study. Many of her publications deal with Tajik and Islamic art and culture, and she has also published work in conjunction with her sister.

== Selected writings ==
- Tajik Artists, Moscow, 1983
- Nizami Poems in Medieval Persian Miniature Painting, Moscow, 1985
- Catalogue of the Artistically Decorated Manuscripts in the Academy of Sciences of Tajikistan, Dushanbe, 1986
- Zoroastrian Elements in Islamic Art and Artifacts, 1997
- Art of Books in Central Asia and India in the Sixteenth to Nineteenth Centuries, Dushanbe, 2001
- Istaravshan, Moscow, 2002
- Tajik Art, Dushanbe, 2002
