= Homiddin Sharifov =

Tajikistani lawyer and politician

Homiddin Hasanovich Sharifov (Tajik: Ҳомиддин Ҳасанович Шарифов; 15 June 1947 – August 2007) was a Tajikistani lawyer and politician with the ruling People's Democratic Party of Tajikistan (PDPT). He served as the Minister of Internal Affairs of Tajikistan from 1996 to 2006.

Sharifov graduated from the Faculty of Law of the V.I. Lenin Tajik State University (today the Tajik National University). He served briefly as the Chairman of the Constitutional Court of Tajikistan in 1995 before becoming the Minister of Internal Affairs in 1996.

In 2001, Sharifov fired ten heads of southern district police departments after Tajik-Afghan border police failed to stop cross-border drug trafficking. He was later responsible for investigating the 2005 car bombings in Dushanbe, which led to the April 2006 arrests of four members of the Islamic Movement of Uzbekistan, and ten more IMU members (including three citizens of Uzbekistan) in July of that year.

After his term as Minister of Foreign Affairs ended, Sharifov ran for the April 2007 by-election to the Assembly of Representatives for the Kulob seat, facing off against Saidobrohimi Nazar of the opposition Islamic Renaissance Party of Tajikistan. Sharifov won the election but died four months later. In the December 2007 by-election to fill the seat vacated by Sharifov's death, Abdurahmon Azimov of the PDPT ran unopposed after the Democratic Party failed to register a candidate.

His son Ahliddin Sharifov followed him into government work and by 2017 had become the head of the Ministry of Internal Affairs department at Baljuvon District.
