= Khonaqohikuhi =

Khonakohi Kuhi Tajik: Хонақоҳи Кӯҳӣ
- Jamoat
- Location within Tajikistan
- Coordinates: 38°39′N 68°34′E
- Country: Tajikistan
- Region: Districts of Republican Subordination
- City: Hisor

Population (2015)
  - Total: 27,624
- Time zone: UTC+5 (TJT)

Khonakohi Kuhi (Tajik: Хонақоҳи Кӯҳӣ, Russian: Хонақоҳи Кӯҳӣ) is a jamoat in Tajikistan. It is part of the city of Hisor in Districts of Republican Subordination. The jamoat has a total population of 27,624 (2015).
