= Almosi =

Almosi Russian: Алмоси Tajik: Алмосӣ
- Village and Jamoat
- Location within Tajikistan
- Coordinates: 38°41′N 68°36′E
- Country: Tajikistan
- Region: Districts of Republican Subordination
- City: Hisor

Population (2015)
  - Total: 21,261
- Time zone: UTC+5 (TJT)
- Official languages: Russian (Interethnic); Tajik (State)

Almosi (Russian: Алмоси; Tajik: Алмосӣ; Persian: الماسی) is a village and jamoat in Tajikistan. It is part of the city of Hisor in Districts of Republican Subordination. The jamoat has a total population of 21,261 (2015).
