= Navobod, Rasht District =

Navobod Навобод
- Town and Jamoat
- Location within Tajikistan
- Coordinates: 39°00′39″N 70°09′00″E
- Country: Tajikistan
- Region: Districts of Republican Subordination
- District: Rasht District

Population (2020)
  - Total: 5,500
- Time zone: UTC+5 (TJT)

Navobod (Tajik: Навобод, Persian: نوآباد) is a town and jamoat in Tajikistan. It is located in Rasht District, one of the Districts of Republican Subordination. The population of the town is 5,500 (January 2020 estimate).

The town is east of Dushanbe in the Vakhsh river valley and has a Köppen climate classification of Dsa and experiences wet and cold winters with dry cool summers. The town is located on a steep hillside at the confluence of three tributaries of the Vakhsh. On the other bank of the Vakhsh are the approx. 3700 m high western foothills of the Peter I Range.

== History ==
During the 1920s the area was a hotbed for the Basmachi, the anti-Soviet resistance in Central Asia. During the Civil War in Tajikistan from 1992 to 1997, the area was a hotbed for Islamist forces, and October 2010, the Tajik Interior Ministry asserted it had killed three militants nearby at Gharm amid an alleged rise in Islamic militancy in the region.
