= Sharipov (surname) =

Sharipov is a masculine surname, its feminine counterpart is Sharipova. It may refer to

- Albert Sharipov (born 1993), Russian football player
- Almasm Rabilavich Sharipov (born 1971), Russian citizen held in the Guantanamo Bay detention camps
- Dariya Sharipova (born 1990), Ukrainian sports shooter
- Dinar Sharipov (born 1966), Russian football player
- Gennadiy Sharipov (born 1974), Uzbekistani footballer
- Fatyh Zaripovich Sharipov, the Hero of Soviet Union
- Ilkhom Sharipov (born 1968), Uzbekistan football defender
- Kayumjan Sharipov (born 1991), Kyrgyzstani football player
- Khomiddin Sharipov (1947–2007), the Interior Minister of Tajikistan
- Mirali Sharipov (born 1987), Uzbekistani judoka
- Mital Sharipov (born 1972), Kyrgyzstani weightlifter
- Rustam Sharipov (born 1971), Ukrainian artistic gymnast
- Sabina Sharipova (born 1994), Uzbekistani tennis player
- Salizhan Sharipov (born 1964), Kyrgyzstani cosmonaut
- Umedzhon Sharipov (born 1991), Tajikistani football player

== See also ==
- Zabit Magomedsharipov (born 1991), Russian professional mixed martial artist
