= Baljuvon District =

Baljuvon District (Russian: Бальджуванский район) (Tajik: Ноҳияи Балҷувон)
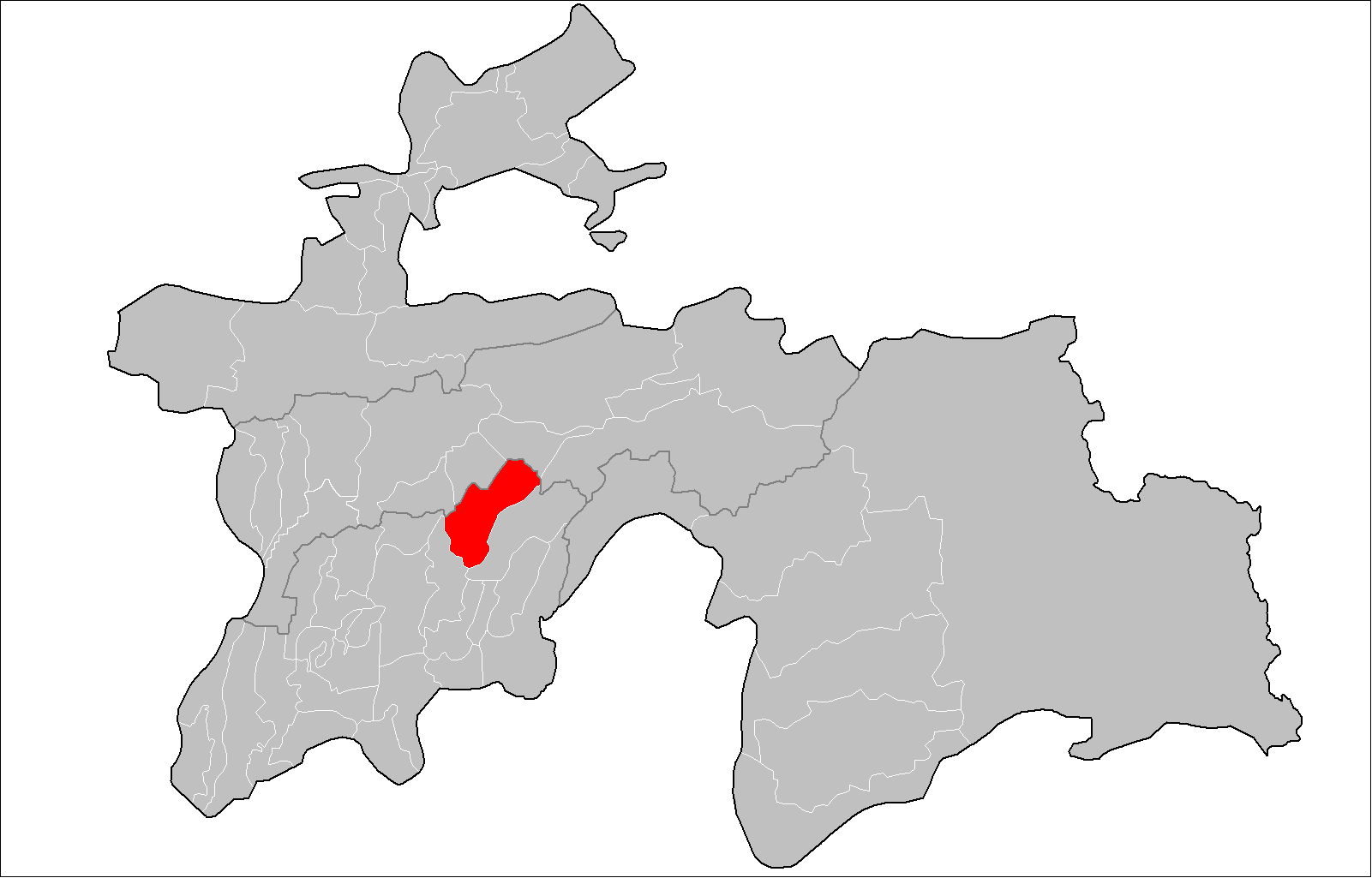
- Baljuvon District Location in Tajikistan
- Coordinates: 38°18′N 69°41′E
- Country: Tajikistan
- Region: Khatlon Region
- Established: 16 Mar 1938
- Capital: Baljuvon

Area
  - Total: 1,300 km^{2} (500 sq mi)

Population (2020)
  - Total: 30,400
  - Density: 23/km^{2} (61/sq mi)
  - Ethnicities: Tajik
  - Languages: Tajik
- Time zone: UTC+5
- Postal code: +992 3357
- Area code: 735140
- Official languages: Russian (Interethnic); Tajik (State)
- Website: baljuvon.tj

Baljuvon District (Russian: Бальджуванский район; Tajik: Ноҳияи Балҷувон) is a district in Khatlon Region, Tajikistan. Its capital is the village Baljuvon. The population of Baljuvon District is 30,400 (January 2020 estimate).

== Administrative divisions ==
The district has an area of about 1,300 km^{2} (500 sq mi) and is divided administratively into five jamoats. They are as follows:

Jamoat	Population (Jan. 2015)
Safar Amirshoev	5,785
Baljuvon	6,041
Sayf Rahim	7,305
Sarikhosor	5,894
Tojikiston	5,474
