= Jaloliddin Balkhi District =

Jaloliddin Balkhi District Russian: Джалолиддин Балхи Tajik: Ноҳияи Ҷалолиддин Балхӣ
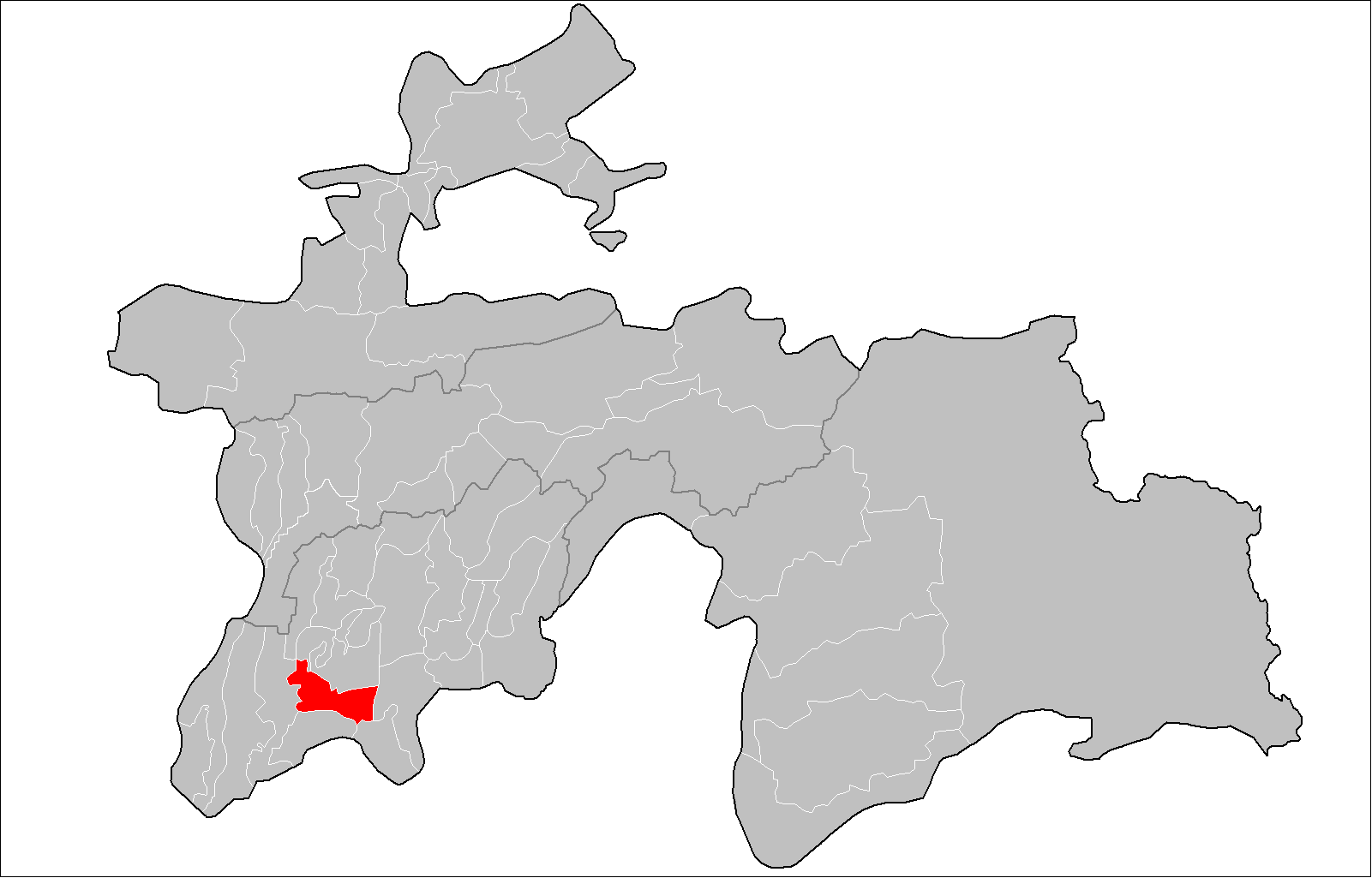
- Location of the district in Tajikistan
- Coordinates: 37°35′N 68°40′E
- Country: Tajikistan
- Region: Khatlon Region
- Capital: Balkh

Area
  - Total: 900 km^{2} (350 sq mi)

Population (2020)
  - Total: 201,300
  - Density: 220/km^{2} (580/sq mi)
- Time zone: UTC+5
- Official languages: Russian (Interethnic); Tajik (State)
- Website: balkhi.tj

Jaloliddin Balkhi District (Russian: Джалолиддин Балхи; Tajik: Ноҳияи Ҷалолиддин Балхӣ, 2007-2016 Rumi District, before 2007 Kolkhozobod District, in 1933 Vakhsh district, 1934 — 1957 Kaganovichabad, before 1933 Tughalang and Halovard), is a district in Khatlon Region, Tajikistan, located south of the regional capital Kurgan-Tyube (Qurghonteppa) and Vakhsh District. It was renamed Rumi District on 23 June 2007 in commemoration of the 800th anniversary of the Persian poet and philosopher Rumi and plans were announced to erect a monument to Rumi in the district. It was renamed again in 2016 to Jaloliddin Balkhi, another name for the poet Rumi.

The population of Jaloliddin Balkhi District is 201,300 (January 2020 estimate). The district capital is Balkh (former name: Kolkhozobod). The district has an area of about 900 km^{2}.

== Administrative divisions ==
The district is divided administratively into two towns and six jamoats. They are as follows:

Jamoat	Population (Jan. 2015)
Balkh (town)	17,500
Orzu (town)	6,700
Frunze	21,575
Kalinin	16,011
Madaniyat	17,672
Navobod	22,675
Tughalon	33,686
Uzun	23,008
