= Sharora =

Sharora Шарора (Russian and Tajik)
- Town and Jamoat
- Location within Tajikistan
- Coordinates: 38.5700°N 68.6597°E
- Country: Tajikistan
- Region: Districts of Republican Subordination
- City: Hisor

Population (2020)
  - Total: 14,300
- Time zone: UTC+5 (TJT)
- Official languages: Russian (Interethnic); Tajik (State)

Sharora (Tajik: Шарора, Persian: شراره) is a town and jamoat in Tajikistan. It is part of the city of Hisor in Districts of Republican Subordination. The population of the town is 14,300 (January 2020 estimate).
