= Nazarsho Dodkhudoyev =

Nazarsho Dodkhudoyev (1915–2000) was a Soviet Tajik politician. He was born in Rushan in the MBAV. He graduated from college in 1935, a year after he started his political career by joining the Komsomol. He edited the youth paper Pioneer of Tajikistan in 1939–1940. He worked for the NKVD secret service throughout the 1940s, before he was appointed head of the provincial executive committee of Gorno-Badakhshan Autonomous Region. In 1950, he became chair of the Presidium of the Supreme Soviet of the Tajik SSR, and from 1956 to 1961, he was the head of the Tajik SSR government as well as its minister of foreign affairs.

He was the father of Larisa Dodkhudoeva and Lola Dodkhudoeva.
