= Aktau Range =

Mountain range of Tajikistan

The Aktau Range is a mountain range of Tajikistan. It lies in the west of Tajikistan, south of Hisor.
