= Durbat =

Durbat Дурбат (Russian and Tajik)
- Village and Jamoat
- Location within Tajikistan
- Coordinates: 38°32′N 68°38′E
- Country: Tajikistan
- Region: Districts of Republican Subordination
- City: Hisor

Population (2015)
  - Total: 20,052
- Time zone: UTC+5 (TJT)

Durbat (Tajik: Дурбат, Russian: Дурбат) is a village and jamoat in Tajikistan. It is part of the city of Hisor in Districts of Republican Subordination. The jamoat has a total population of 20,052 (2015).
