= Dehqonobod =

- Village and Jamoat
- Location within Tajikistan
- Coordinates: 38°33′N 68°34′E
- Country: Tajikistan
- Region: Districts of Republican Subordination
- City: Hisor

Population (2015)
  - Total: 20,686
- Time zone: UTC+5 (TJT)

Dehqonobod (Persian: دهقان‌آباد) is a village and jamoat in Tajikistan. It is part of the city of Hisor in Districts of Republican Subordination. The jamoat has a total population of 20,686 (2015).
