= Dahyak =

- Location in Tajikistan
- Coordinates: 39°49′30″N 68°58′45″E
- Country: Tajikistan
- Region: Sughd Region
- City: Istaravshan

Dahyak (Tajik: Даҳяк) is a village in northern Tajikistan. It is part of the city Istaravshan in the Sughd Region.
