= Asht District =

Asht District Russian: Аштский район Tajik: Ноҳияи Ашт
- District
- Location of Asht District in Tajikistan
- Coordinates: 40°45′N 70°25′E
- Country: Tajikistan
- Region: Sughd Region
- Capital: Shaydon

Area
  - Total: 2,800 km^{2} (1,100 sq mi)

Population (2020)
  - Total: 168,100
  - Density: 60/km^{2} (160/sq mi)
- Time zone: UTC+5 (TJT)
- Official languages: Russian (Interethnic); Tajik (State)

Asht District or Nohiya-i Asht (Russian: Аштский район; Tajik: Ноҳияи Ашт) is a district in the northernmost tip of Sughd Region, Tajikistan, bordering on Uzbekistan to the north, the east, and the south. Its capital is the town Shaydon. The population of the district is 168,100 (January 2020 estimate). Sarvan, a Tajik exclave in Uzbekistan, is in this district.

== Administrative divisions ==
The district has an area of about 2,800 km^{2} (1,000 sq mi) and is divided administratively into one town and eight jamoats. They are as follows:

Jamoat	Population (Jan. 2015)
Shaydon (town)	15,300
Asht	21,409
Iftikhor	11,201
Mehrobod	13,123
Oriyon	17,487
Oshoba	21,260
Ponghoz	28,532
Punuk	8,841
Shodoba	8,990
