= Jamoats of Tajikistan =

Administrative division in Tajikistan

The jamoats of Tajikistan (Russian: джамоаты, romanized: dzhamoaty; Tajik: ҷамоати деҳот, romanized: jamoati dehot, "village communes") are the third-level administrative divisions, similar to communes or municipalities, in the Central Asian country of Tajikistan. As of January 2020, there are 368 rural jamoats, 65 towns and 18 cities in Tajikistan. Each jamoat is further subdivided into villages (or deha or qyshqloq)

The jamoats and towns, and their population figures (as of January 2015) by district of each region are listed below:

== Sughd Region ==
Jamoat	Population (2015)
Asht District
Shaydon (town)	15,300
Asht	21,409
Iftikhor	11,201
Mehrobod	13,123
Oriyon	17,487
Oshoba	21,260
Ponghoz	28,532
Punuk	8,841
Shodoba	8,990
Ayni District
Zarafshan (town)	2,200
Anzob	8,238
Ayni	14,862
Dardar	7,562
Fondaryo	9,478
Rarz	8,998
Shamtuch	6,557
Urmetan	18,016
Buston City
Palos (town)	2,700
Devashtich District
Ghonchi (town)	11,800
Dalyoni Bolo	23,670
Gazantarak	17,801
Ismoili Somoni	13,970
Mujum	27,835
Rosrovut	14,419
Vahdat	31,955
Yakhtan	15,060
Ghafurov District
Ghafurov (town)	18,400
Chashmasor	10,275
Dadoboy Kholmatov	12,966
Goziyon	18,760
Haidar Usmonov	37,017
Isfisor	39,590
Ismoil	19,844
Khistevarz	52,758
Ovchi Kalacha	21,585
Unji	45,760
Yova	40,297
Zarzamin	12,744
Guliston City
Adrasmon (town)	14,600
Choruqdayrron (town)	3,500
Konsoy (town)	5,400
Navgarzan (town)	400
Sirdaryo (town)	2,500
Zarnisor (town)	2,200
Isfara City
Naftobod (town)	4,300
Nurafshon (town)	1,600
Shurob (town)	3,000
Chilgazi	15,997
Chorku	37,065
Khonabad	12,159
Kulkand	22,731
Lakkon	7,579
Navgilem	38,104
Shahrak	16,555
Surkh	14,456
Vorukh	30,506
Istaravshan City
Chorbogh	16,488
Guli Surkh	42,582
Javkandak	10,200
Nijoni	10,350
Nofaroj	10,875
Poshkent	19,746
Qal'achai Kalon	15,433
Qalaibaland	9,820
Sabriston	16,822
Zarhalol	30,683
Jabbor Rasulov District
Mehrobod (town)	14,800
Dehmoy	14,802
Ghulakandoz	39,006
Gulkhona	24,077
Hayoti Nav	14,037
Somoniyon	15,700
Konibodom City
Hamrabaev	27,143
Lohuti	21,652
Ortikov	23,813
Patar	17,870
Pulatan	
Sharipov	24,419
Kuhistoni Mastchoh District
Ivan-Tojik	13,578
Langar	9,666
Mastchoh District
Buston (town)	13,600
Obshoron (town)	3,100
Sughdiyon (town)	2,300
Mastchoh	21,929
Navbahor	13,388
Obburdon	37,104
Paldorak	20,837
Panjakent City
Amondara	13,380
Chinor	6,879
Farob	8,650
Khalifa Hassan	14,728
Khurmi	10,451
Kosatarosh	18,986
Loiq Sherali	18,675
Moghiyon	19,553
Rudaki	18,465
Sarazm	27,877
Shing	10,873
Sujina	12,285
Voru	12,347
Yori	19,045
Shahriston District
Bunjikat	15,344
Shahriston	22,903
Spitamen District
Navkat (town)	16,900
Istiqlol	18,015
Khurramzamin	
Kurush	26,469
Sarband	8,502
Tagoyak	16,224
Tursun Uljaboev	16,874
Zafarobod District
Homid Aliev (town)	11,500
Mehnatobod (town)	13,208
Zafarobod (town)	27,148
Jomi	7,264
Ravshan	16,363

== Districts of Republican Subordination ==
Jamoat	Population (2015)
Fayzobod District
Fayzobod (town)	9,400
Dustmurod Aliev	13,164
Buston	8,853
Chashmasor	
Javonon	13,359
Mehrobod	11,885
Miskinobod	17,749
Qalaidasht	12,074
Vashgird	5,509
Hisor City
Sharora (town)	12,700
Almosi	21,261
Dehqonobod	20,686
Durbat	20,052
Hisor	32,912
Khonaqohikuhi	27,624
Mirzo Rizo	25,971
Mirzo Tursunzoda	20,303
Navobod	26,321
Oriyon	
Somon	28,691
Lakhsh District
Vahdat (town)	5,900
Alga	4,467
Jirgatol	9,219
Kashot	3,890
Lakhsh	4,938
Muksu	10,501
Pildon	7,790
Sartalo	3,353
Surkhob	2,987
Yangi Shahr	6,442
Nurobod District
Darband (town)	1,200
Hakimi	13,666
Izzatullo Halimov	8,035
Khumdon	
Komsomolobod	15,046
Mujiharf	17,366
Safedchashma	8,015
Rasht District
Gharm (town)	8,000
Navobod (town)	5,000
Askalon	4,114
Hijborak	5,609
Hoit	7,716
Jafr	7,245
Kalai Surkh	15,711
Kalanak	10,411
Nusratullo Makhsum	13,762
Navdi	15,425
Obi Mehnat	2,304
Rahimzoda	12,114
Tagoba	5,890
Yasman	
Roghun City
Obigarm (town)	6,500
Qadiob	13,000
Sicharogh	3,692
Rudaki District
Navobod (town)	9,100
Somoniyon (town)	22,600
Mirzo Tursunzoda (town)	17,900
Chimteppa	45,221
Chorgulteppa	37,551
Chorteppa	32,076
Choryakkoron	
Esanboy	20,072
Guliston	41,130
Kiblai	13,860
Lohur	20,047
Rohati	32,152
Rossiya	31,030
Sarikishti	38,474
Sultonobod	16,066
Zainabobod	36,844
Sangvor District
Childara	5,841
Sangvor	4,785
Tavildara	5,950
Vahdat	
Vakhiyo	
Shahrinav District
Mirzo Tursunzoda (town)	6,900
Boghiston	9,331
Chust	17,135
Hasanov	26,990
Istiqlol	15,463
Sabo	17,557
Shahrinav	11,123
Tojikobod District
Langarishoh	10,360
Nushor	11,608
Qalailabiob	11,102
Shirinchashma	
Shogadoev	5,162
Tursunzoda City
Navobod	36,979
Pakhtaobod	9,690
Qaratogh	37,948
Rabot	13,053
Jura Rahmonov	33,405
Regar	19,080
Seshanbe	15,197
10-Solagii Istiqloliyat	29,492
Tursun Tuychiev	23,911
Vahdat City
Nu'mon Roziq (town)	11,600
Abdullo Abdulvosiev	43,020
Bahor	28,276
Bozorboy Burunov	24,876
Chorsu	3,913
Chuyangaron	21,076
Guliston	37,452
Karim Ismoilov	34,544
Rajab Ismoilov	19,185
Romit	15,440
Simiganj	35,473
Varzob District
Takob (town)	2,400
Ayni	14,052
Chorbogh	31,585
Dehmalik	8,034
Luchob	7,174
Varzobqala	11,438
Zideh	7,219

== Khatlon Region ==
Jamoat	Population (2015)
Baljuvon District
Baljuvon	6,041
Safar Amirshoev	5,785
Sarikhosor	5,894
Sayf Rahim	7,305
Tojikiston	5,474
Jaloliddin Balkhi District
Balkh (town)	17,500
Orzu (town)	6,700
Frunze	21,575
Kalinin	16,011
Madaniyat	17,672
Navobod	22,675
Tughalon	33,686
Uzun	23,008
Danghara District
Danghara (town)	25,000
Korez	15,027
Lohur	6,648
Lolazor	18,285
Oqsu	20,119
Pushing	13,293
Sangtuda	12,686
Sebiston	12,736
Sharipov	20,452
Dusti District
Gharavuti (town)	7,100
Dehqonobod	15,061
Gardi Gulmurodov	16,472
Jilikul	25,382
Nuri Vakhsh	17,319
20-Solagii Istiqloliyati Jumhurii Tojikiston	22,447
Farkhor District
Farkhor (town)	22,900
Darqad	14,503
Dehqonariq	12,327
Farkhor	12,057
Galaba	9,278
Ghayrat	16,143
Gulshan	12,418
20-Solagii Istiqloliyati Tojikiston	14,736
Vatan	23,123
Zafar	13,885
Hamadoni District
Moskovskiy (town)	22,500
Chubek	18,490
Dashtigulo	19,331
Mehnatobod	21,816
Panjob	10,418
Panjrud	13,092
Qahramon	18,294
Turdiev	10,385
Jayhun District
Dusti (town)	16,500
Istiqlol	24,717
Panj	22,319
Qumsangir	25,212
Vahdati milli	20,882
Yakkadin	8,754
Jomi District
Abdurahmoni Jomi (town)	12,700
Aral	
Dusti	18,192
Iftikhor	14,223
Ittifoq	20,008
Kalinin	19,411
50-Solagii Tojikiston	18,247
Yakkatut	24,690
Khovaling District
Ghaffor Mirzo	8,806
Jombakht	13,662
Khovaling	10,601
Lohuti	12,732
Shugnov	7,666
Khuroson District
Obikiik (town)	8,500
Ayni	26,724
Fakhrobod	12,264
Ghallaobod	18,253
Hiloli	18,426
Qizilqal'a	17,607
Nosiri Khusrav District
Firuza	11,796
Istiqlol	9,820
Navruz	13,935
Kulob City
Dahana	29,776
Kulob	19,840
Zarbdor, Kulob	23,839
Ziraki	28,747
Kushoniyon District
Bokhtariyon (town)	6,700
Bustonqala	4,300
Ismoili Somoni	7,800
Mehnatobod	34,201
Navbahor	18,281
Oriyon	10,392
Sarvati Istiqlol	33,071
Zargar	49,235
Levakant City
Guliston	18,151
Vahdat	8,040
Mu'minobod District
Mu'minobod (town)	13,000
Balkhobi	12,590
Boghgay	13,053
Childukhtaron	
Dehibaland	14,363
Nuralisho Nazarov	18,733
Shamsiddin Shohin	10,850
Norak City
Dukoni	15,681
Pulisangin	11,960
Panj District
Panj (town)	11,700
Kabut Sayfutdinov	22,684
Mehvar	17,298
Namuna	21,321
Nuri Vahdat	13,425
Ozodagon	20,748
Qubodiyon District
Qubodiyon (town)	12,200 (2020)
Nosir Khusrav	35,248
Navobod	11,200
Utaqara Nazarov	
Niyozov	18,682
20-Solagii Istiqlol	
Takhti Sangin	36,769
Zarkamar	11,787
Shahrituz District
Shahrituz (town)	15,800
Kholmatov	31,654
Jura Nazarov	17,808
Obshoron	8,648
Pakhtaobod	21,270
Sayyod	15,858
Shamsiddin Shohin District
Chagam	6,097
Dashti-Jum	4,942
Doghiston	7,092
Langardara	4,895
Nuriddin Mahmudov (Yol)	6,446
Sarichashma	11,680
Shuroobod	10,700
Temurmalik District
Sovet (town)	9,900
Boboyunus	8,664
Kangurt	9,430
Laqay Qarmishev	8,113
Qaroqamish	7,224
Saidmu'min Rahimov (Vatan)	
Tanobchi	7,454
Vakhsh District
Kirov (town)	5,500
Vakhsh (town)	14,100
Mash'al	
Rudaki	22,085
20-Solagii Istiqloliyati Tojikiston	32,260
Tojikobod	32,716
Vahdat	14,727
Vose' District
Hulbuk (town)	22,700
Abdi Avazov	19,310
Guliston	24,739
Mirali Mahmadaliev	
Khudoyor Rajabov	24,772
Abuabdullohi Rudaki	10,295
Tugarak	29,188
Mirzoali Vayzov	30,495
Yovon District
Hayotinav (town)	3,900
Yovon (town)	33,200
Chorgul	15,711
Dahana	20,574
Hasan Huseynov	24,894
Norin	21,314
Obshoron	30,242
Sitorai Surkh	20,833
Gulsara Yusufova	19,243

== Gorno-Badakhshan Autonomous Region ==
Jamoat	Population (2015)
Darvoz District
Nulvand	4,025
Qal'ai Khumb	8,366
Saghirdasht	5,420
Vishkharv	3,637
Ishkoshim District
Ishkoshim (R. Yusufbekov)	7,673
Ptup	
Qozideh	1,880
Shitkharv	2,223
Vrang	6,541
Askar Zamirov	2,770
Zong	6,355
Murghob District
Alichur	2,242
Gozho Berdiboev	1,368
Karakul	757
Murghob	7,468
Qizilrabot	1,675
Rangkul	1,569
Roshtqal'a District
Barvoz	3,301
Mirsaid Mirshakar	5,514
Roshtqal'a	2,838
Sizhd	3,447
Tavdem (K. Gadoliev)	7,689
Tusyon	2,491
Rushon District
Abdulvosiev (Shidz)	2,331
Bartang	2,185
Basid	1,480
Dodkhudoev (Barrushon)	6,128
Pastkhuf	3,208
Rushon	6,577
Savnob	3,047
Shughnon District
Navobod	6,864
Porshinev	8,723
Shahbozov (Darmorakht)	2,759
Shirinjonov (Sokhcharv)	2,932
Suchon	8,436
Vanqal'a	5,575
Ver	4,891
Vanj District
Rovand	6,663
Tekharv	3,926
Vanj (Abulloev)	11,217
Vodkhud	2,457
Yazghulom	6,215
Zhovid	3,862
