= Somon, Tajikistan =

Somon
- Jamoat
- Location within Tajikistan
- Coordinates: 38°35′N 68°33′E
- Country: Tajikistan
- Region: Districts of Republican Subordination
- City: Hisor

Population (2015)
  - Total: 28,691
- Time zone: UTC+5 (TJT)
- Official languages: Russian (Interethnic); Tajik (State)

Somon (Tajik: Сомон, Russian: Сомон, formerly Khonaqoh) is a jamoat in Tajikistan. It is part of the city of Hisor in Districts of Republican Subordination. The jamoat has a total population of 28,691 (2015).
