= Istaravshan =

City in Sughd Province, Tajikistan

Istaravshan Истаравшан Истаравшан
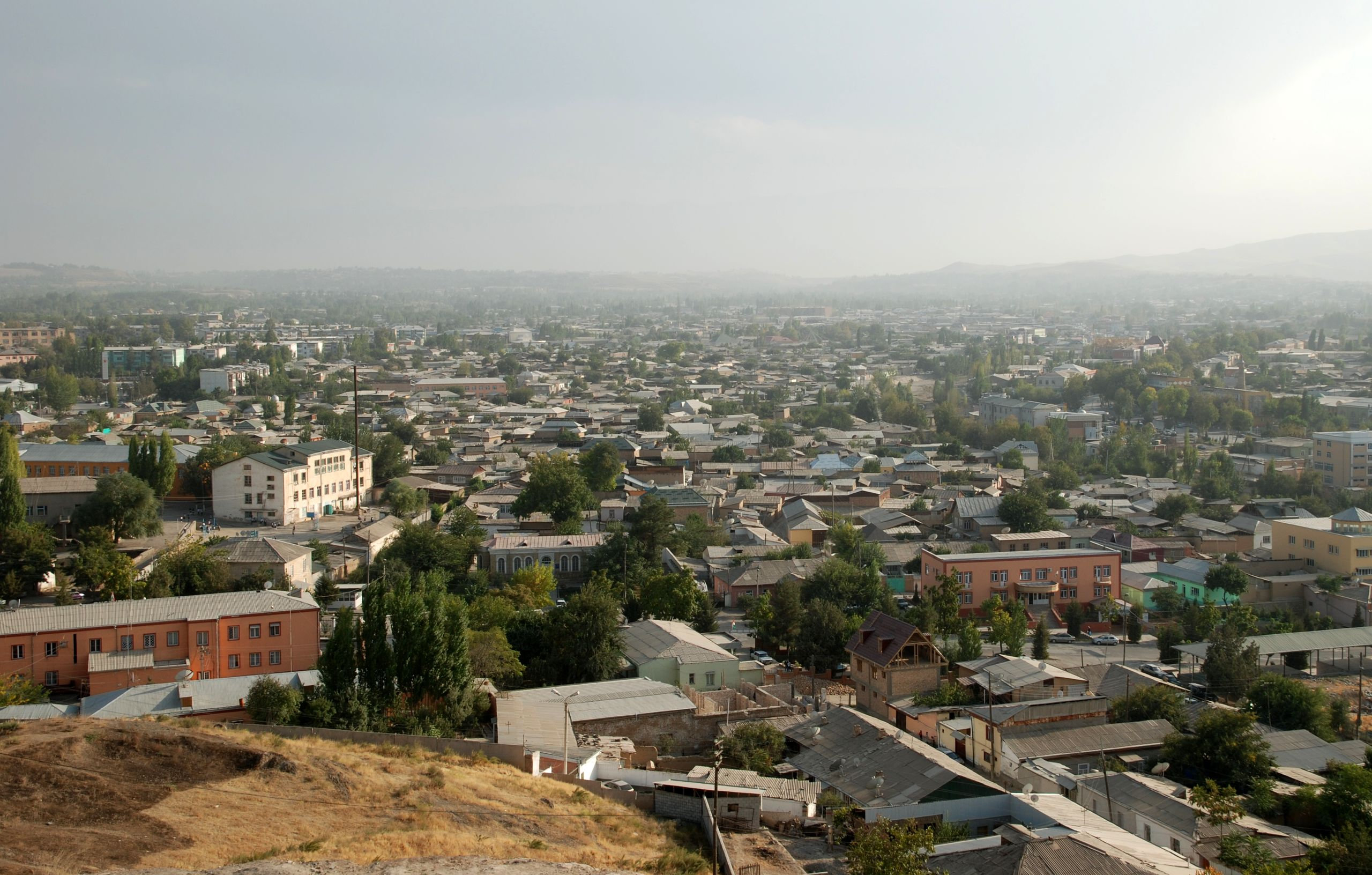
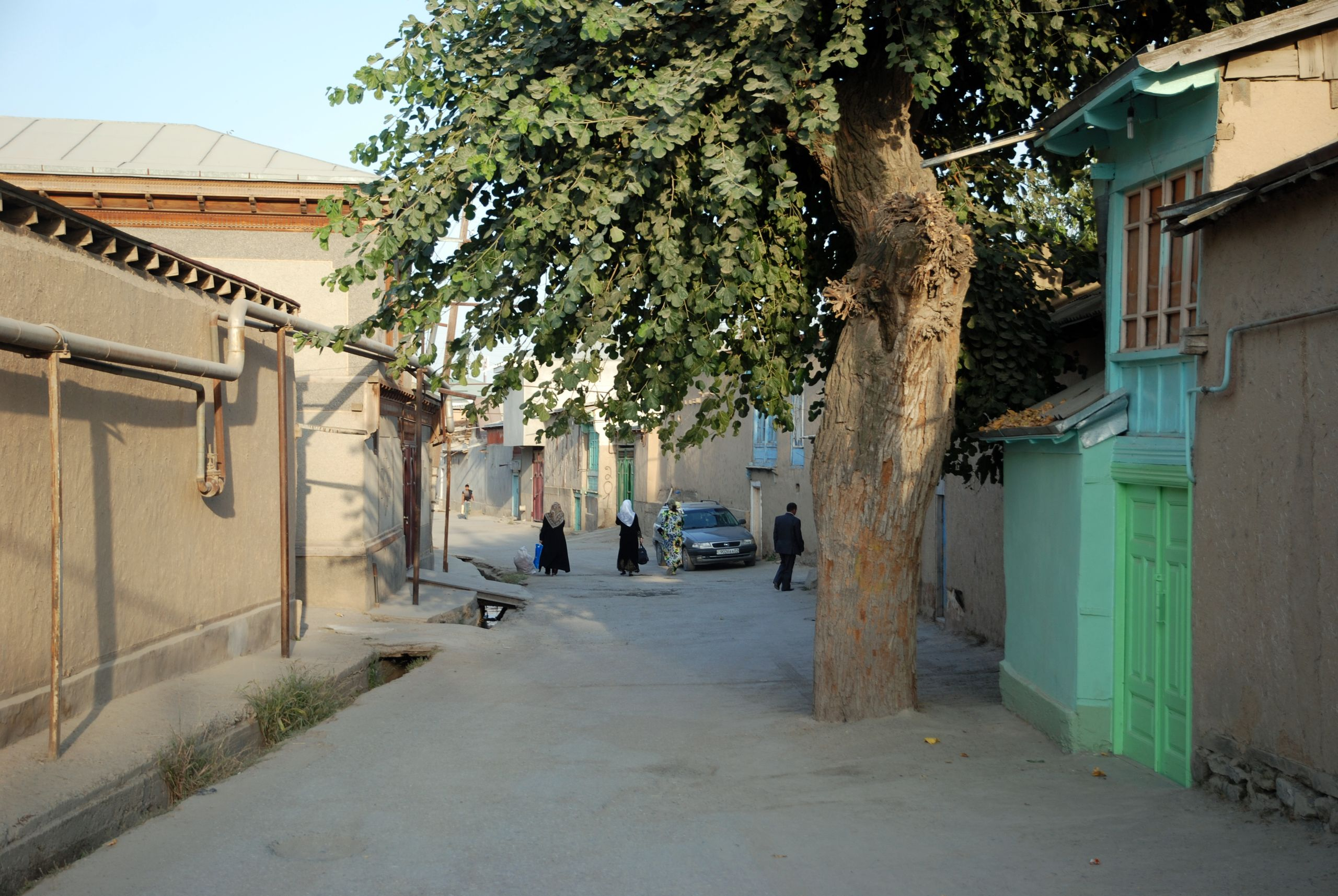
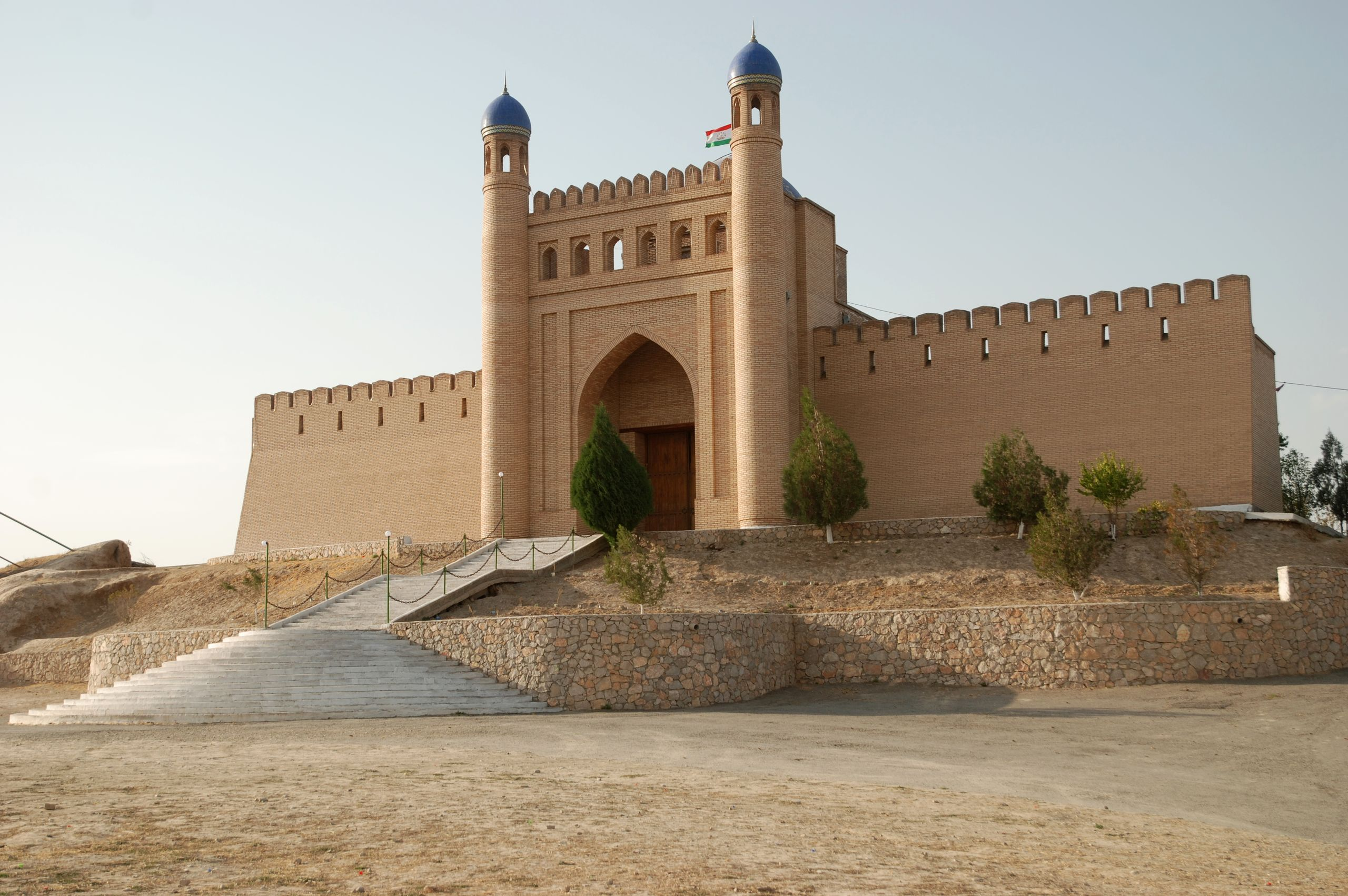
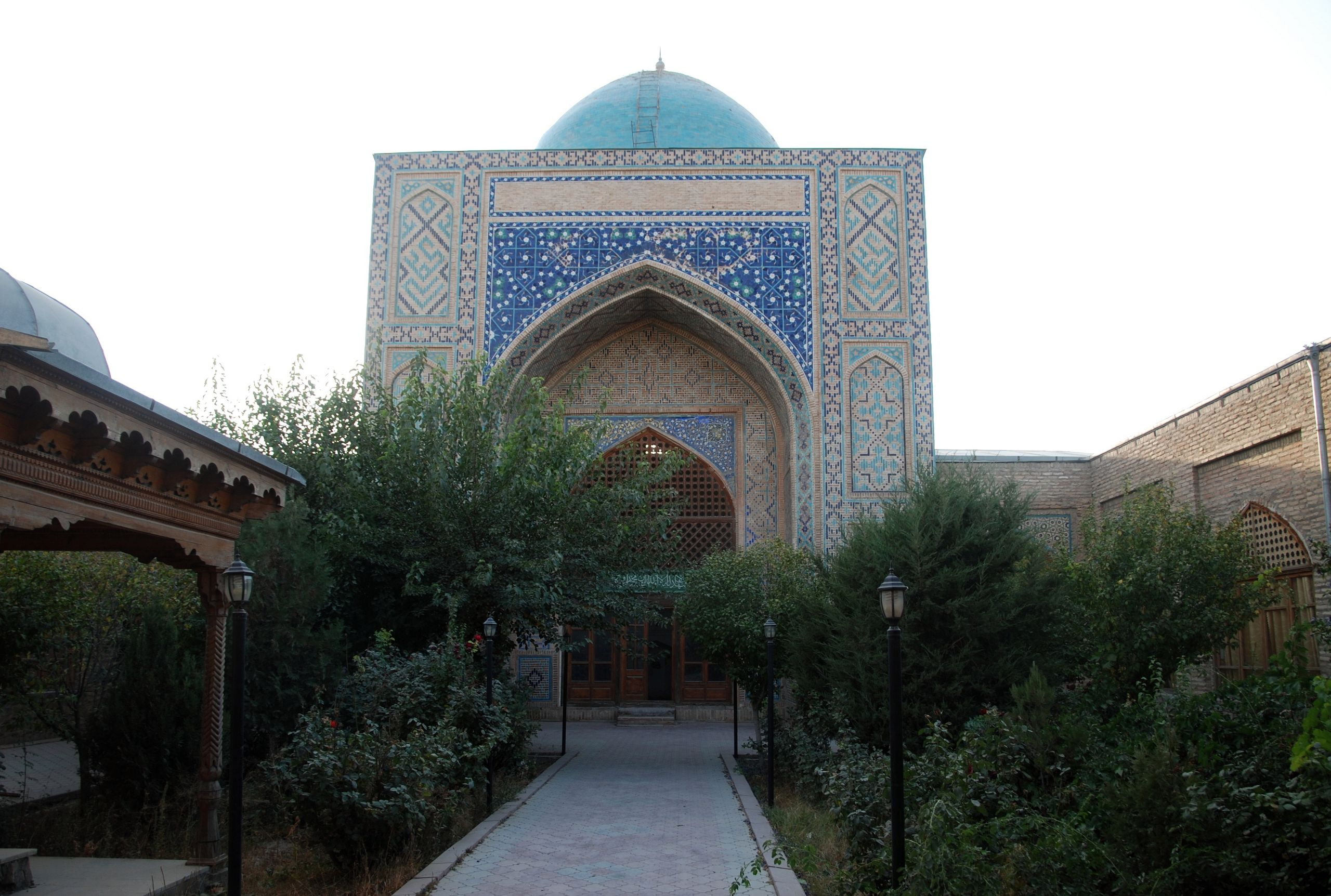
- From the top to bottom-right, View over the City, Old Town, Mug Teppe Fort, Statue of Rudaki, Kuk-Gumbaz Mosque

- Location in Tajikistan
- Coordinates: 39°54′39″N 69°00′23″E
- Country: Tajikistan
- Region: Sughd Region
- Elevation: 992 m (3,255 ft)

Population (2020)
  - City: 273,500
  - Urban: 65,600
- Time zone: UTC+5
- Official languages: Russian (Interethnic); Tajik (State)

Istaravshan (Tajik: Истаравшан; Russian: Истаравшан) is a city in Sughd Region in Tajikistan. In 2000, the Tajik government changed the name of the city from Uroteppa (Tajik: Ӯротеппа; Ura-Tyube, Russian: Ура-Тюбе).

The city lies in the northern foothills of the Turkistan mountain range, 78 kilometers southwest of Khujand, on the main road connecting Tajikistan's two largest cities, Khujand and Dushanbe. Bordered by Uzbekistan in the north and west, and Kyrgyzstan in the east, Istaravshan's administrative area encompasses 1,830 square kilometers and a population of 273,500 people. Most of them (76%) live in the outlying countryside.

Istaravshan is one of Central Asia's oldest towns of commerce and crafts. The city celebrated its 2,500th birthday in the year 2002. It was one of three proposed locations for ancient Cyropolis, which was built on the north-eastern outskirts of the Achaemenid Empire by the king Cyrus in the 6th century B.C.

== Climate ==
Istaravshan has a continental Mediterranean climate (Köppen Dsa). The average annual temperature in Istaravshan is 12.2 °C (54.0 °F). There is more rainfall in winter than in summer, and about 400 millimetres (16 in) of precipitation falls annually.

Climate data for Istaravshan, 1961–1990
Month	Jan	Feb	Mar	Apr	May	Jun	Jul	Aug	Sep	Oct	Nov	Dec	Year
Mean daily maximum °C (°F)	4.1 (39.4)	5.4 (41.7)	10.2 (50.4)	17.5 (63.5)	23.1 (73.6)	29.0 (84.2)	31.1 (88.0)	29.7 (85.5)	25.0 (77.0)	17.9 (64.2)	11.7 (53.1)	6.9 (44.4)	17.6 (63.8)
Mean daily minimum °C (°F)	−5.9 (21.4)	−4.3 (24.3)	0.9 (33.6)	7.2 (45.0)	11.4 (52.5)	15.7 (60.3)	17.8 (64.0)	16.0 (60.8)	11.0 (51.8)	5.3 (41.5)	0.7 (33.3)	−2.9 (26.8)	6.1 (42.9)
Average precipitation mm (inches)	33.9 (1.33)	38.0 (1.50)	71.0 (2.80)	81.7 (3.22)	52.5 (2.07)	15.2 (0.60)	9.0 (0.35)	3.8 (0.15)	6.7 (0.26)	28.5 (1.12)	29.8 (1.17)	31.5 (1.24)	401.6 (15.81)
Average precipitation days (≥ 0.1 mm)	10	12	14	16	14	8	5	4	4	8	9	10	114
Source: World Meteorological Organization

== Subdivisions ==
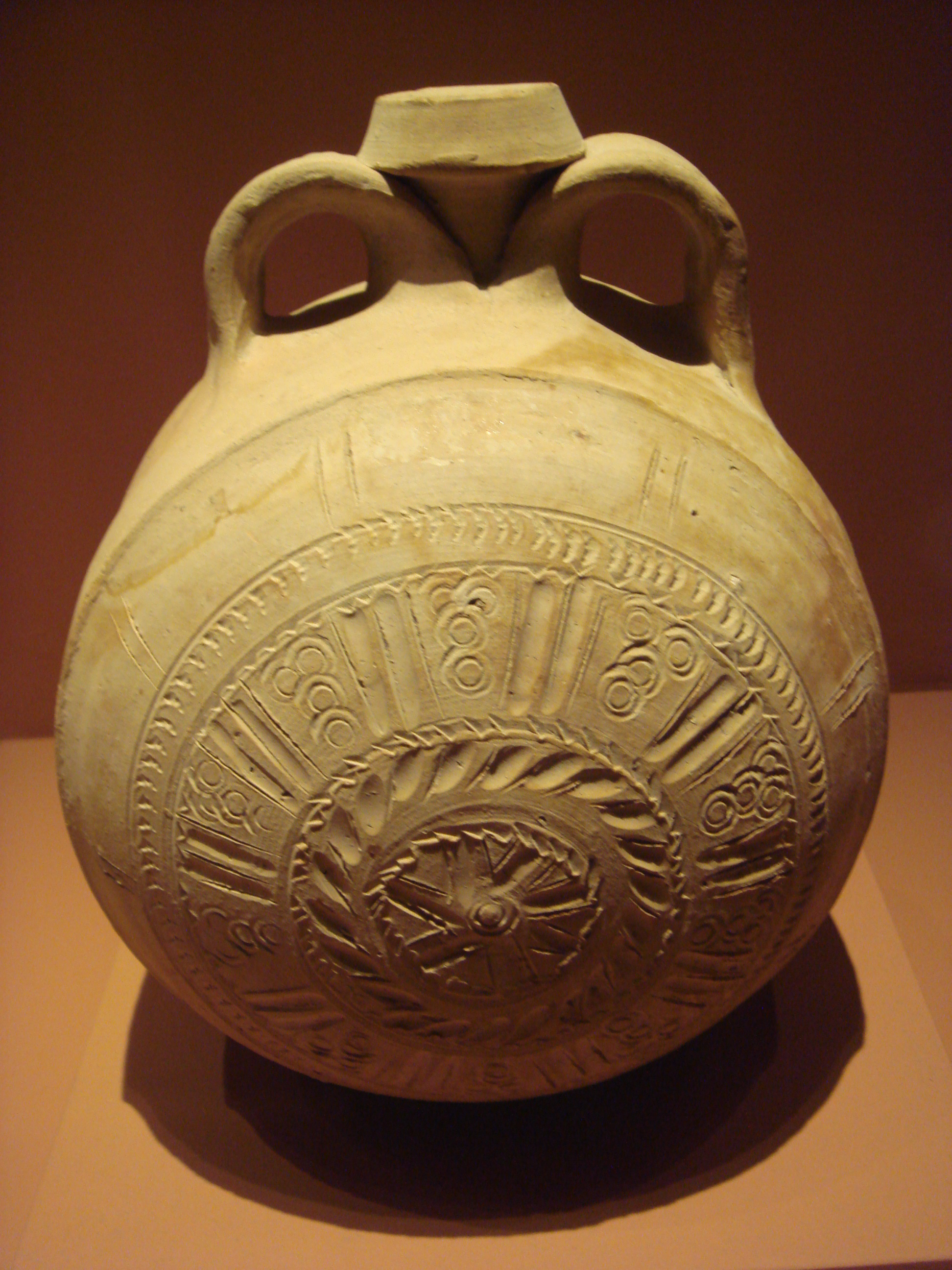
Gourd from Istaravchan, Tajikistan, 10th century CE, National Museum of Tajikistan.

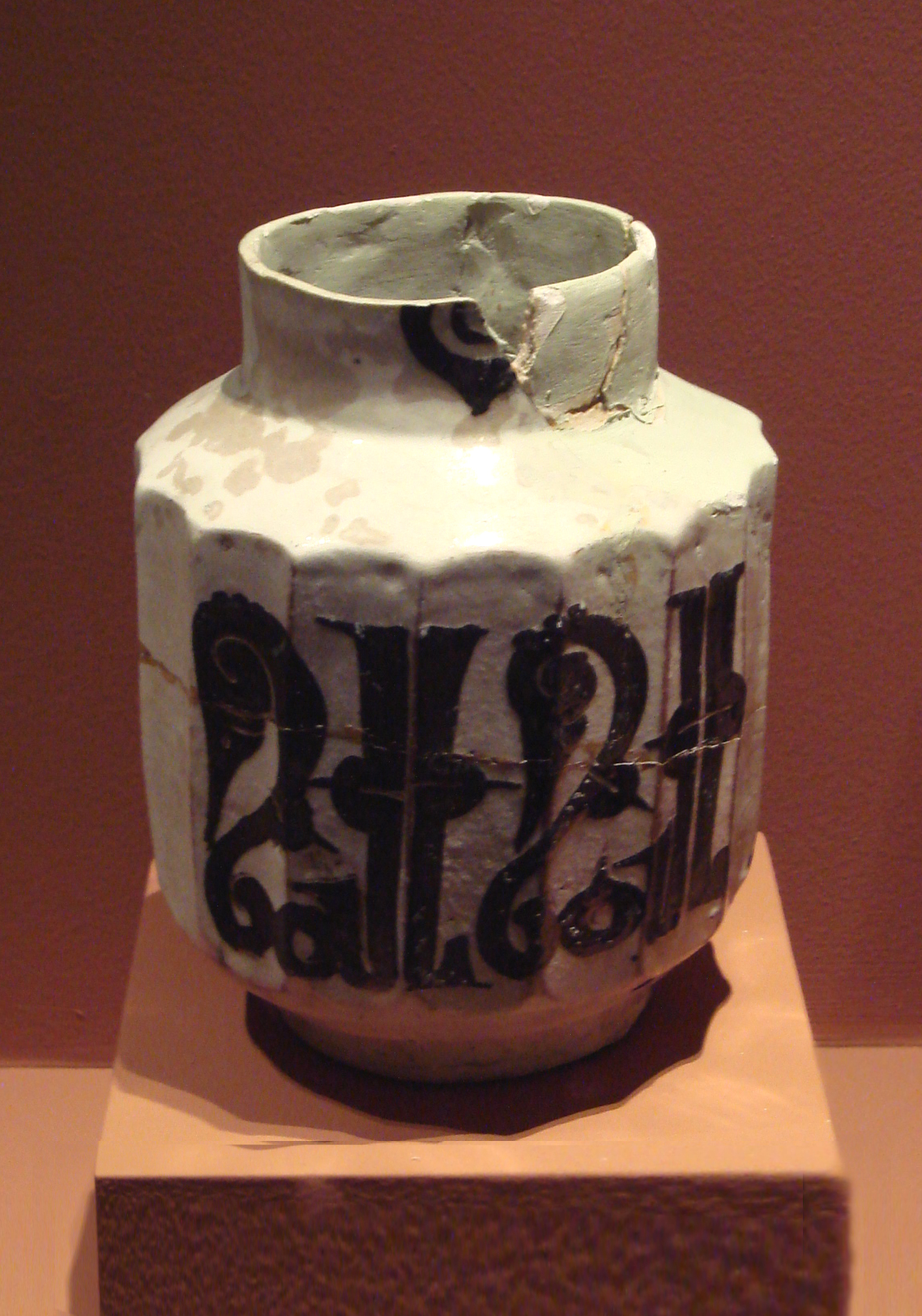
Vase with Kufic inscription al-Yumn (Felicity), 10-11th century CE, Istaravchan, Tajikistan, National Museum of Antiquities of Tajikistan (941-1442)

Before ca. 2018, Istaravshan was the seat of Istaravshan District, which covered the rural part of the present city of Istaravshan. The city of Istaravshan covers Istaravshan proper and ten jamoats. These are as follows:

Jamoat	Population (Jan. 2015)
Chārbāgh	16,488
Gul-i Surkh	42,582
Jawkandak	10,200
Nijānī	10,350
Nāfarāj	10,875
Pāshkent	19,746
Qal'a-i Kalān	15,433
Qal'a-i Baland	9,820
Sabristān (Frunze)	16,822
Zarhalāl	30,683

== Istaravshan on stamps ==
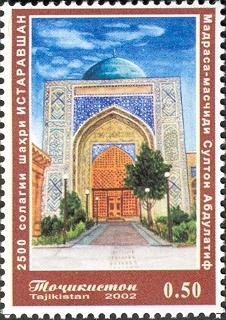
Stamps of Tajikistan, 2002

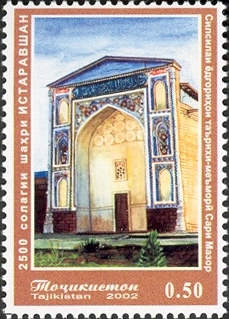
Stamps of Tajikistan, 2002

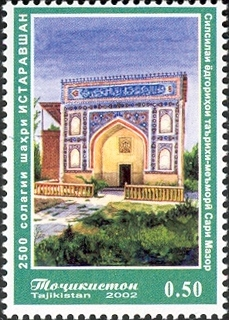
Stamps of Tajikistan, 2002

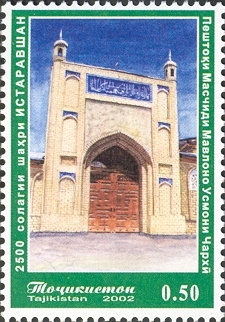
Stamps of Tajikistan, 2002

== Notable people ==
- Dilshad Barna (1800–1905), poet, historian and teacher, who wrote in Persian and Chaghatai Turkic
- Ulmas Mirsaidovich Mirsaidov (born 1945), theoretical chemist and professor

== See also ==
- List of cities in Tajikistan
- Osrūshana
