= Time in Tajikistan =

Tajikistan Standard Time
- Time zone
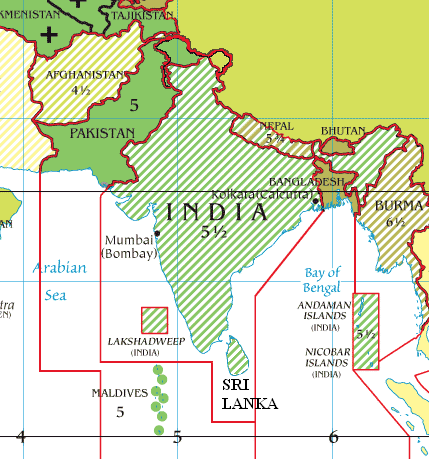
- Map of South Asia with time zones; Tajikistan is colored green to indicate UTC+05:00.

UTC offset
- TJT: UTC+05:00

Current time
- 02:18, 26 July 2026 UTC+05:00 [refresh]

Observance of DST
- DST is not observed in this time zone.

Time in Tajikistan is given by Tajikistan Time (TJT; UTC+05:00). Tajikistan does not currently observe daylight saving time. The IANA identifier for Tajikistan Time is Asia/Dushanbe. Tajikistan observes the same time zone as most of its central Asian neighbors such as, Kazakhstan, Kyrgyzstan, Pakistan, Turkmenistan and Uzbekistan.

== IANA time zone database ==
Data for Tajikistan directly from zone.tab of the IANA time zone database. Columns marked with * are the columns from zone.tab itself.

c.c.*	Coordinates*	TZ*	Comments*	UTC offset
TJ	+3835+06848	Asia/Dushanbe		+05:00

== History ==
Historic time zones for Tajikistan (both as an independent country and a Soviet state)

From	To	Zone	DST
2 May 1924	21 June 1930	UTC+5	no
21 June 1930	1 April 1981	UTC+6	no
1 April 1981	31 March 1991	UTC+6	yes
31 March 1991	9 September 1991	UTC+5	yes
9 September 1991	Present	UTC+5	no
