= Kyrgyzstan–Tajikistan border =

International border

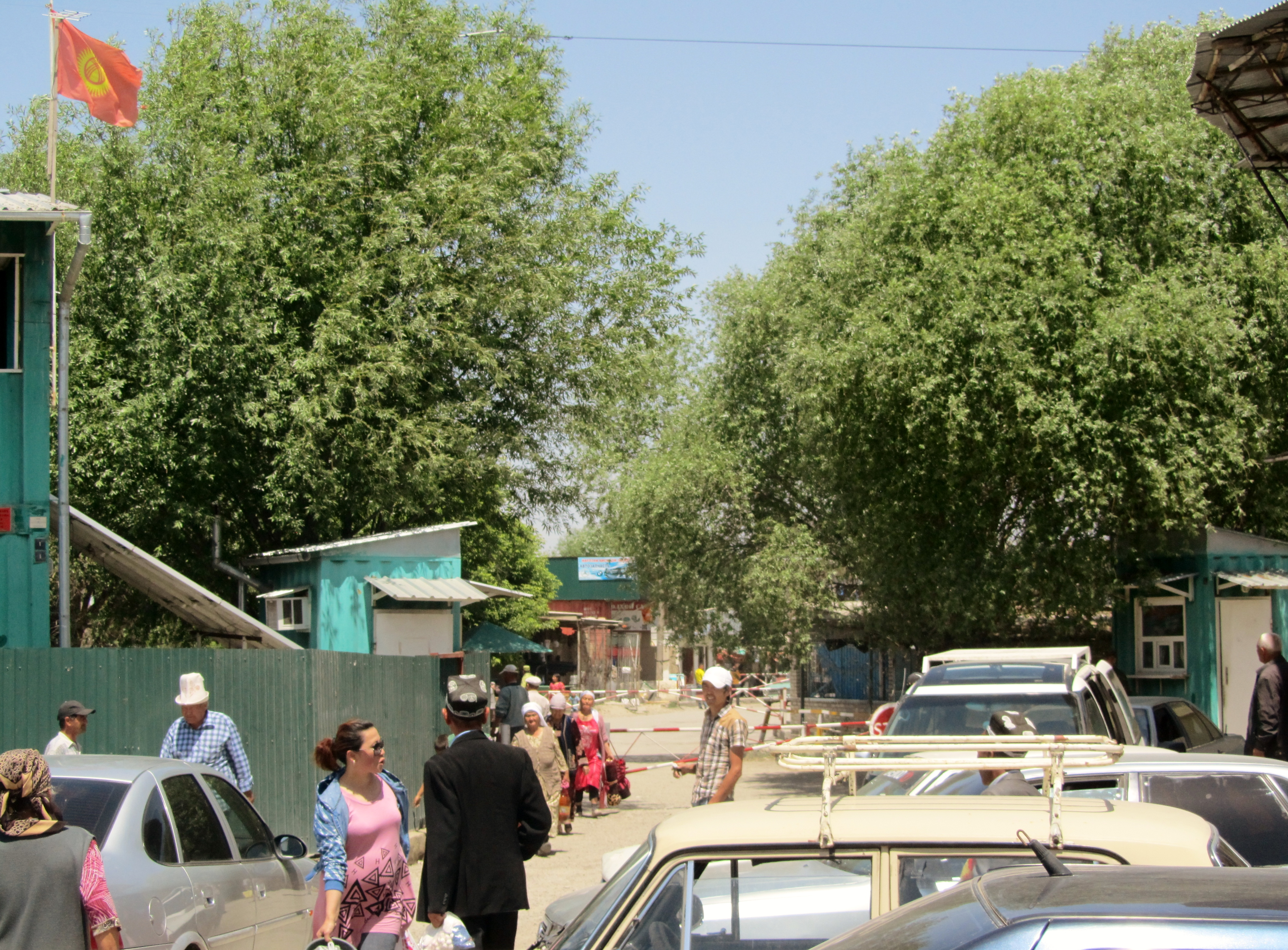
A Kyrgyz-Tajik border checkpoint, as viewed from Leylek District in Kyrgyzstan.

The border between Kyrgyzstan and Tajikistan is 984 kilometres (611 mi) long and runs from the tripoint with Uzbekistan to the tripoint with China.

== Description ==
The border starts in the north at the tripoint with Uzbekistan in the Ferghana Valley. The border proceeds roughly westwards, with a sharp Tajik protrusion at the town of Chorku; it almost reaches the Kayrakkum Reservoir, however a thin strip of Tajik territory lies between the reservoir and the border. It then turns southwards near the Tajik enclave of Kayragach before turning sharply eastwards upon reaching the Turkestan Range. The border then follows this range, and the Alay and Trans-Alay ranges, eastwards to the Chinese tripoint.

=== Exclaves ===
On the border there are two Tajik exclaves within Kyrgyzstan: Vorukh and Kayragach.

== History ==
Soviet Central Asia in 1922 before national delimitation

Kyrgyzstani and Tajik boundary markers

National Territorial Delimitation (NTD) of the area along ethnic lines had been proposed as early as 1920. At this time Central Asia consisted of two Autonomous Soviet Socialist Republics (ASSRs) within the Russian SFSR: the Turkestan ASSR, created in April 1918 and covering large parts of what are now southern Kazakhstan, Uzbekistan and Tajikistan, as well as Turkmenistan, and the Kirghiz Autonomous Soviet Socialist Republic (Kirghiz ASSR, Kirgizistan ASSR on the map), which was created on 26 August 1920 in the territory roughly coinciding with the northern part of today's Kazakhstan (at this time Kazakhs were referred to as 'Kyrgyz' and what are now the Kyrgyz were deemed a sub-group of the Kazakhs and referred to as 'Kara-Kyrgyz' i.e. mountain-dwelling 'black-Kyrgyz'). There were also the two separate successor 'republics' of the Emirate of Bukhara and the Khanate of Khiva, which were transformed into the Bukhara and Khorezm People's Soviet Republics following the takeover by the Red Army in 1920.

On 25 February 1924 the Politburo and Central Committee of the Soviet Union announced that it would proceed with a policy of NTD in Central Asia. The process was to be overseen by a Special Committee of the Central Asian Bureau, with three sub-committees for each of what were deemed to be the main nationalities of the region (Kazakhs, Turkmen and Uzbeks), with work then exceedingly rapidly. There were initial plans to possibly keep the Khorezm and Bukhara PSRs, however it was eventually decided to partition them in April 1924, over the often vocal opposition of their Communist Parties (the Khorezm Communists in particular were reluctant to destroy their PSR and had to be strong-armed into voting for their own dissolution in July of that year).

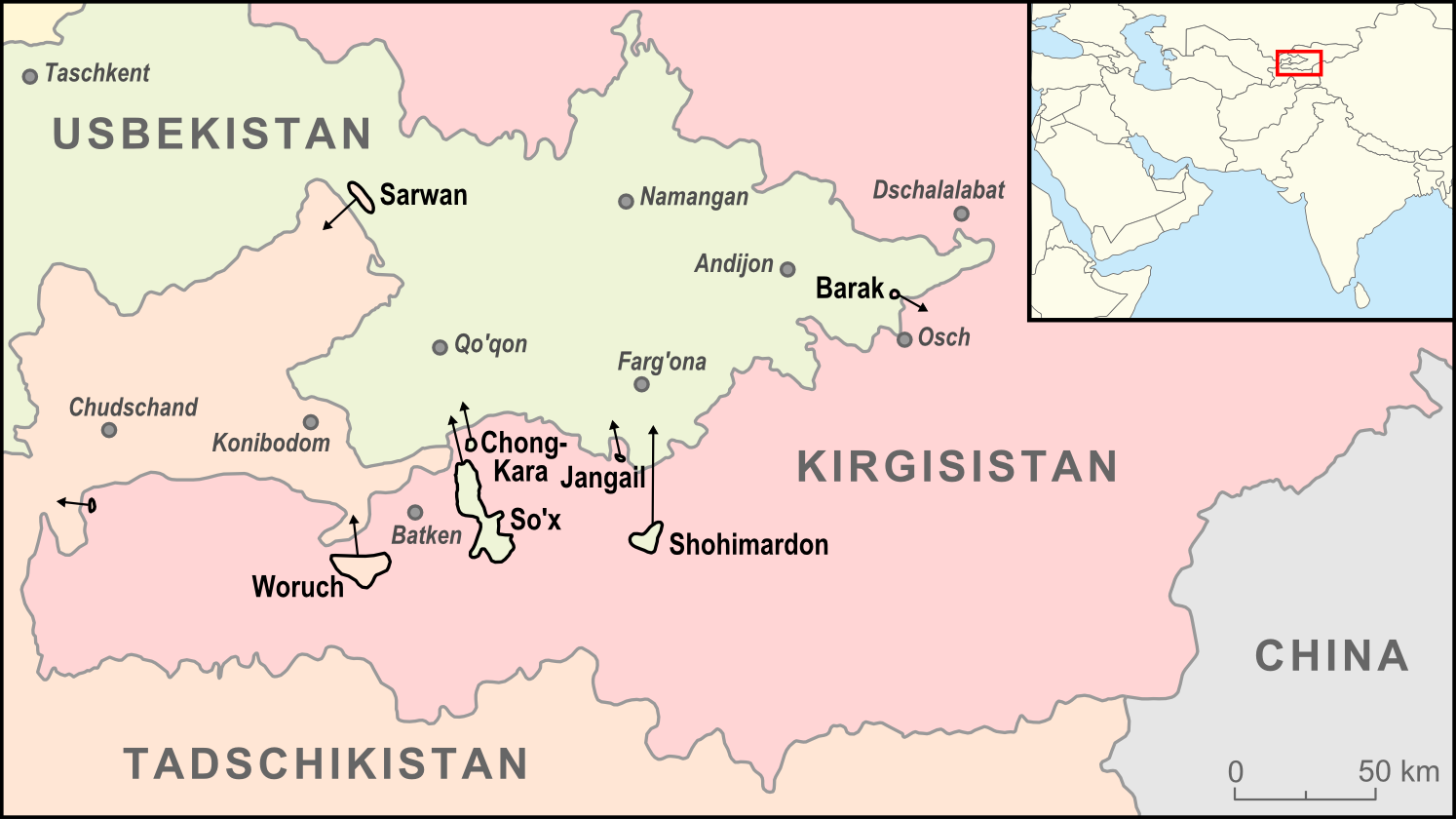
Map showing Tajikistan's exclaves; Kayragach is the smaller one at the far left

The border assumed its current position in 1929. The Kara-Kirghiz Autonomous Oblast was originally within the Russia SSR in October 1924, with borders matching those of modern Kyrgyzstan. In 1925, it was renamed the Kirghiz Autonomous Oblast in May 1925, then became the Kirghiz ASSR in 1926 (not to be confused with the Kirghiz ASSR that was the first name of Kazak ASSR), finally becoming the Kirghiz SSR in 1936.

The Soviets aimed to create ethnically homogeneous republics; however, many areas were ethnically mixed (e.g. the Ferghana Valley), and they experienced difficulties in assigning a 'correct' ethnic label to some peoples. In spite of this, regional elites strongly argued in favour of strict delineation, and was further complicated by a lack of expert knowledge and paucity of accurate or up-to-date ethnographic data on the region. Furthermore, NTD also aimed to create 'viable' entities, with economic, geographical, agricultural and infrastructural matters unrelated to (and sometimes trumping those of) ethnicity.

=== International border ===
The boundary became an international frontier in 1991 following the dissolution of the Soviet Union and the independence of its constituent republics. There were tensions in the post-independence era over border delimitation and policing, and especially after an Islamic Movement of Uzbekistan (IMU) incursion into Kyrgyzstan from Tajik territory in 1999/2000. At present border delimitation is ongoing.

This tension has led to conflict, primarily over access to resources within each nation's territory, especially in regards to water. As early as 2004, border clashes between Kyrgyzstan and Tajikistan were being covered by local media, with over 70 border incidents being reported from 2004 to 2015. This conflict then escalated into a three-day battle in April–May 2021, which killed 55 people and forced over 33,000–58,000 Kyrgyz civilians to evacuate from the Batken Region. Clashes between Kyrgyzstan and Tajikistan became increasingly frequent throughout 2022, culminating in a 14–20 September confrontation that caused 137,000 Kyrgyz civilians to flee the border area and killed over 100 people, including at least 37 civilians, in the weeklong clashes.

On February 21, 2025, the head of the Kyrgyzstan SCNS Kamchybek Tashiev and the head of Tajikistan SCNS Saimumin Yatimov signed an agreement on the delimitation of the state borders.

A month later, on March 13, the two parties reached an agreement regarding their border, putting an end to the decade-long conflict. The Kyrgz and Tajik parliaments still have to ratify the agreement, which is expected to be completed before March 31. On that day, presidents Sadyr Japarov and Emomali Rahmon are expected to meet with Uzbek President Shavkat Mirziyoyev for a summit to discuss the future of the Ferghana Valley. As part of the settlement, the Tort-Kocho road, along with a 15 m (49 ft) "security zone" were declared a neutral zone or a condominium.

== Border crossings ==
Listed from North to South:

Kyrgyz name	Tajik name	Type of crossing	opening times
Kyzyl-Bel	Guliston, Isfara	international road	24/7
Kulundu	Ovchiqal'acha	international road	24/7
Kayragach, Akaryk	Todzhikobod, Mehrobod	bilateral road	24/7
Karamyk	Daroot Korgan	bilateral road	daytime
Bor-Döbö	Kyzylart	international road	24/7

The border to the enclave of Lolazor is unguarded, crossing from mainland Tajikistan happens at the Kayragach/Todzikobod crossing 7 km to the north. The enclave of Vorukh is connected to Tajikistan by a road from Khodzhai-Aalo to Ak-Sai through Kyrgyz territory, on which there are also no border checks. Conversely, the road from Batken to Razzakov runs through the Tajik town of Khodzhai-Aalo, also with no routine border checks.

== Settlements near the border ==
=== Kyrgyzstan ===
- Batken
- Samarkandyk
- Tsentralnoye
- Kulundu
- Sulukta
- Samat
- Ak-Suu
- Kök-Tash
- Kara-Teyit
- Karamyk

=== Tajikistan ===
- Lakkon
- Kulkent
- Navgilem
- Isfara
- Surkh
- Chorku, Tajikistan
- Shurab, Tajikistan
- Qistaquz
- Ghafurov
- Mehrobod
- Mujum
- Dakhkat
- Rosrovut

== Historical maps ==
Historical English-language maps of the Kyrgyz SSR-Tajik SSR border, mid to late 20th century:

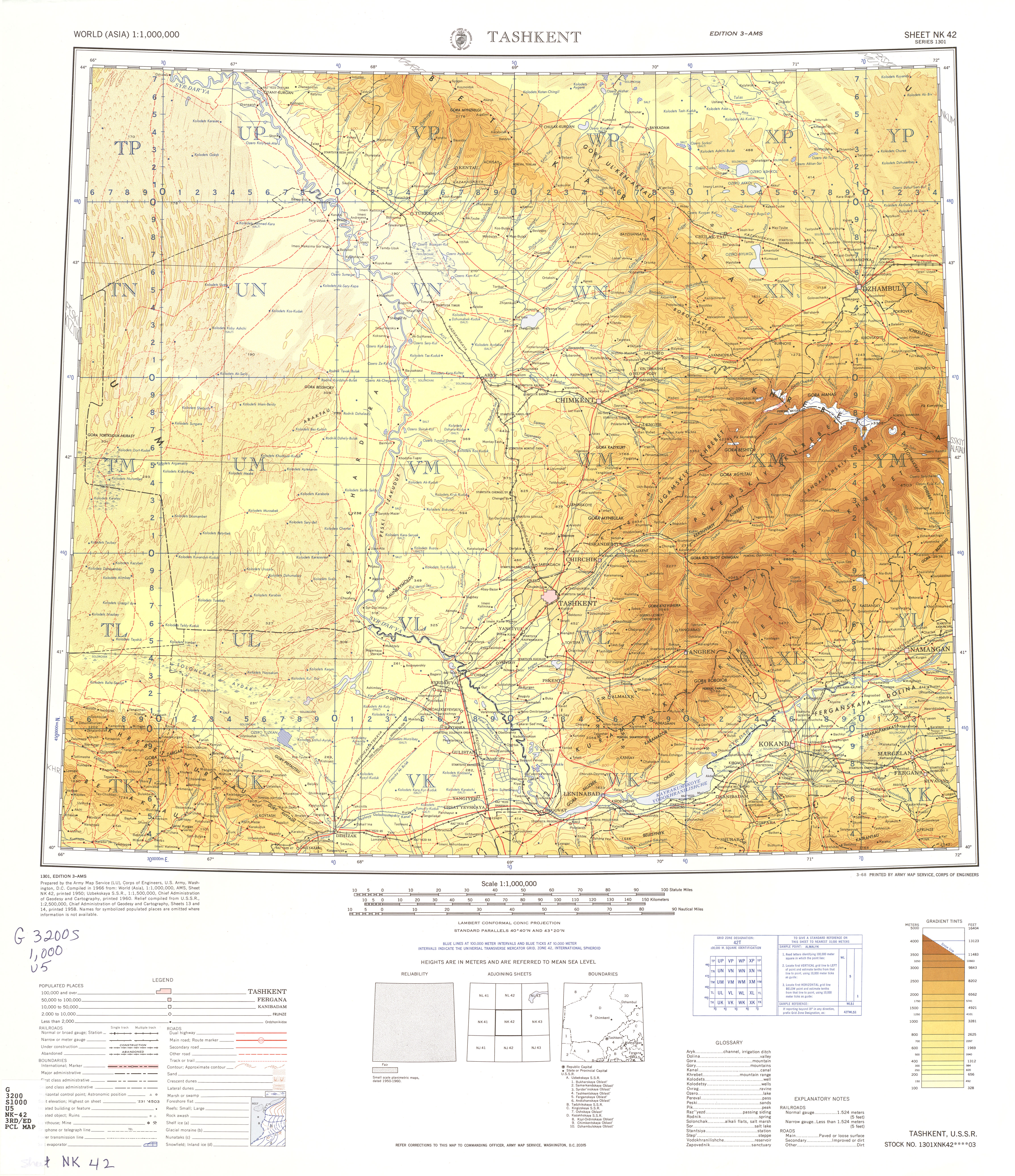

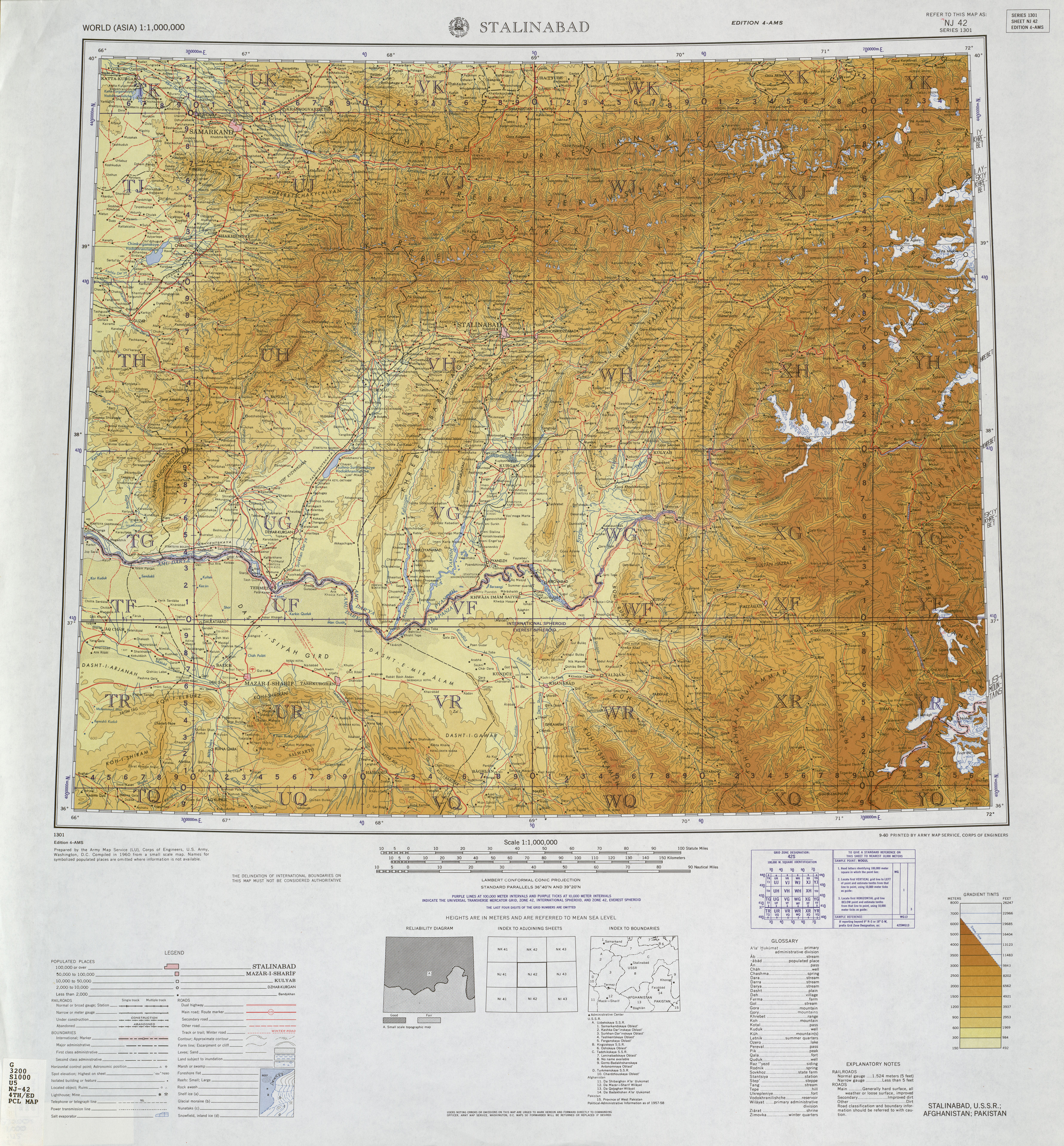

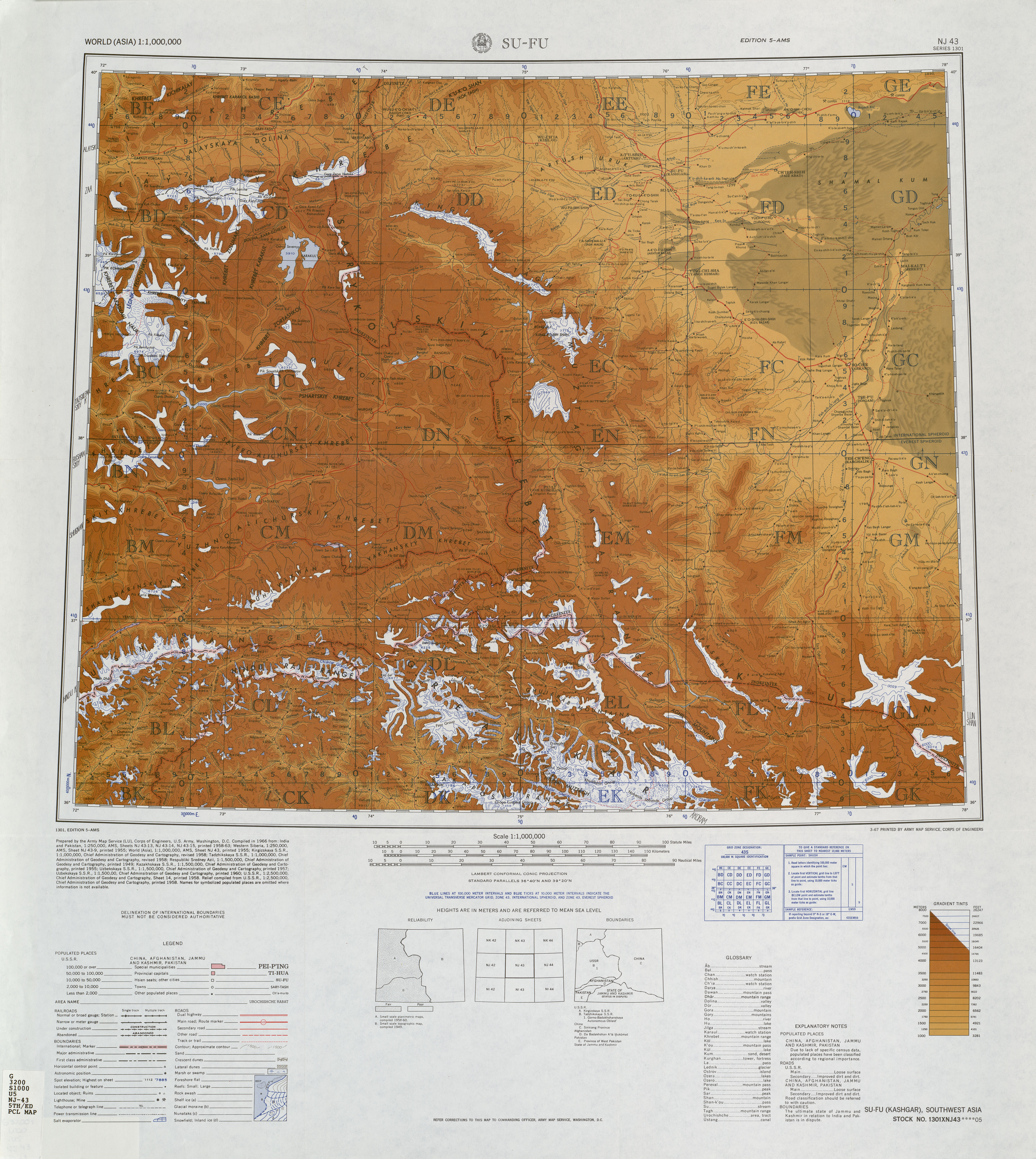

== See also ==
- Kyrgyzstan–Tajikistan relations
