= Isfara District =

Coordinates: 40°07′N 70°38′E

Isfara District Ноҳияи Исфара نوحیای اسفره
- District
- Ноҳияи Исфара نوحیای اسفره
- Location of Isfara District in Tajikistan
- Country: Tajikistan
- Region: Sughd Region
- Capital: Isfara
- Time zone: UTC+5 (TJT)
- Postal code: 735920

Isfara District or Nohiya-i Isfara (Tajik: Ноҳияи Исфара) is a former district at the northeastern edge of Sughd Region, Tajikistan, bordering on Uzbekistan's Ferghana Valley to the north and Kyrgyzstan to the south. Its capital was Isfara. Vorukh, an enclave surrounded by Kyrgyzstan, is also part of Isfara. Around 2018, it was merged into the city of Isfara.

== Administrative divisions ==
The district was divided administratively into jamoats. They were as follows (and population).

Jamoats of Isfara District
Jamoat	Population
Chilgazi	12150
Chorku	28846
Khonabad	9614
Kulkent	17732
Lakkon	5514
Navgilem	28311
Shahrak	13991
Surkh	10396
Vorukh	23121
