= 2021 Kyrgyzstan–Tajikistan clashes =

2021 conflict between Kyrgyzstan and Tajikistan

- Part of conflicts in territory of the former Soviet Union
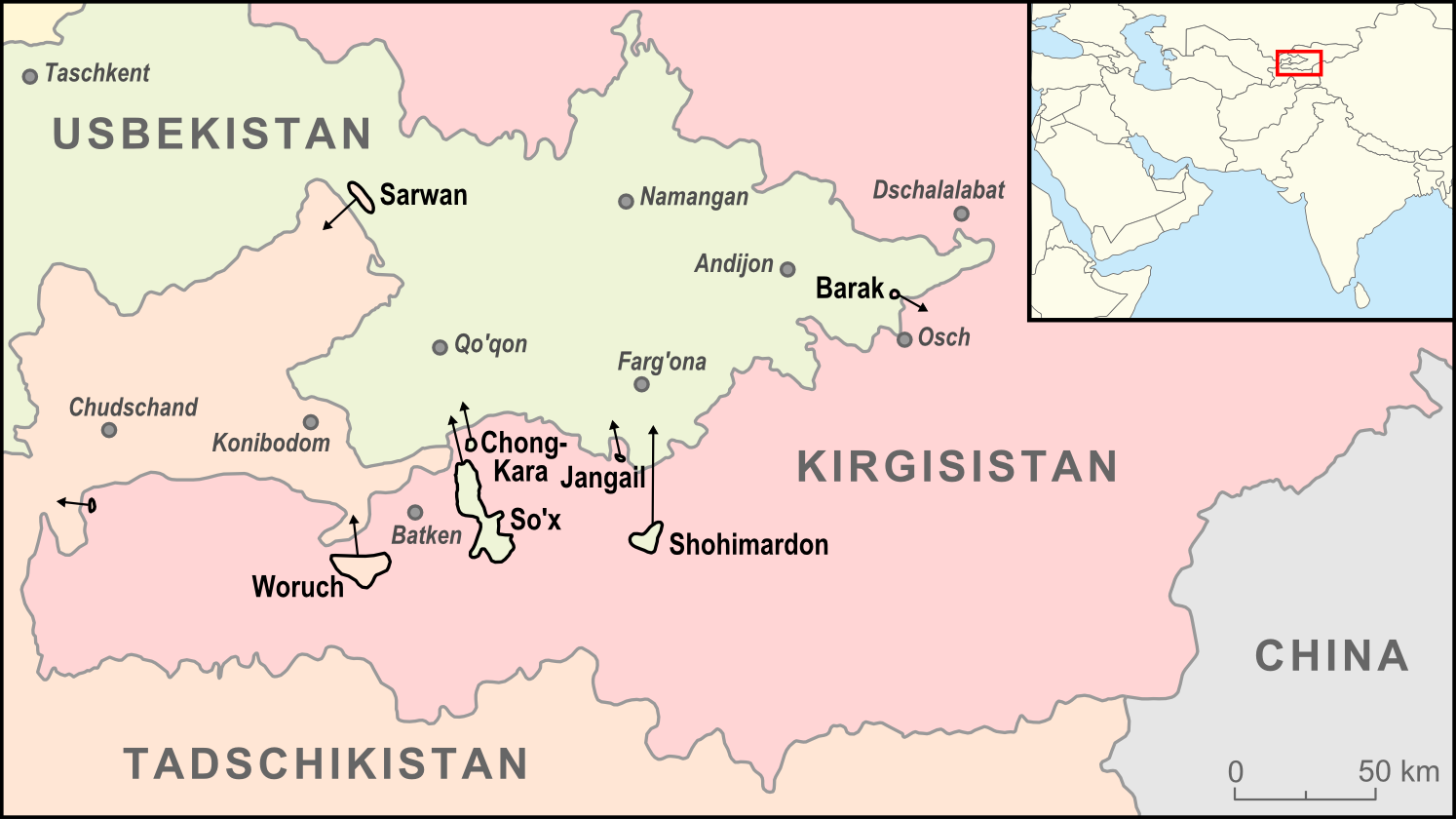
- Map showing the borders between Kyrgyzstan (red) and Tajikistan (orange)
Date	28 April – 1 May 2021 (3 days)
Location	Kök-Tash, Batken, Batken District, Kyrgyzstan–Tajikistan border
Result	Ceasefire

Belligerents
Kyrgyzstan	Tajikistan

Commanders and leaders
Sadyr Japarov; Kamchybek Tashiev; Ularbek Sharsheev	Emomali Rahmon; Sherali Mirzo; Rajabali Rahmonali; Khurshed Izattula Mohammadzad

Units involved
Border Guard Service; Internal Troops	Armed Forces; Border Guard Service; Special Purpose Mobile Unit

Casualties and losses
3 servicemen killed (per Kyrgyzstan)	9 servicemen killed (per Tajikistan); 11 servicemen killed (per RFE/RL); 1 BTR-70 destroyed
- 33 Kyrgyzstani and 10 Tajikistani civilians killed 190 Kyrgyzstani and 87 Tajikistani civilians injured (Note: Kyrgyzstani casualties per Kyrgyzstan and Tajikistani casualties per Tajikistan)

A three-day border conflict between Kyrgyzstan and Tajikistan began on 28 April 2021. The clashes stemmed from a long-running dispute over a water supply facility near the village of Kök-Tash. Tajikistani media raised some concern over military drills in Batken prior to the conflict.

== Timeline ==
=== Pre-ceasefire ===
==== April ====
Batken Region in Kyrgyzstan

On 28 April, forces of Kyrgyzstan and Tajikistan on the Kyrgyzstan–Tajikistan border between Kök-Tash and Khojai A'lo, started the clashes, resulting in four deaths and dozens of injuries. The initial clashes were fought with fists and thrown stones, but quickly escalated to gunfire, with reports of use of heavy weaponry. The following day clashes resumed, with reported incidents in the Kyrgyz village of Kok-Terek and some other villages in the Batken and Leylek Districts, and with at least 41 people killed from both sides and roughly 10,000 people evacuated. The same day the foreign ministers of Kyrgyzstan and Tajikistan agreed to a ceasefire at the border. On 30 April, Tajikistan acknowledged the ceasefire in a statement published by its state information service. The ceasefire was broken twice by Tajiks during the conflict, however, including the night of 29 April.

==== May ====
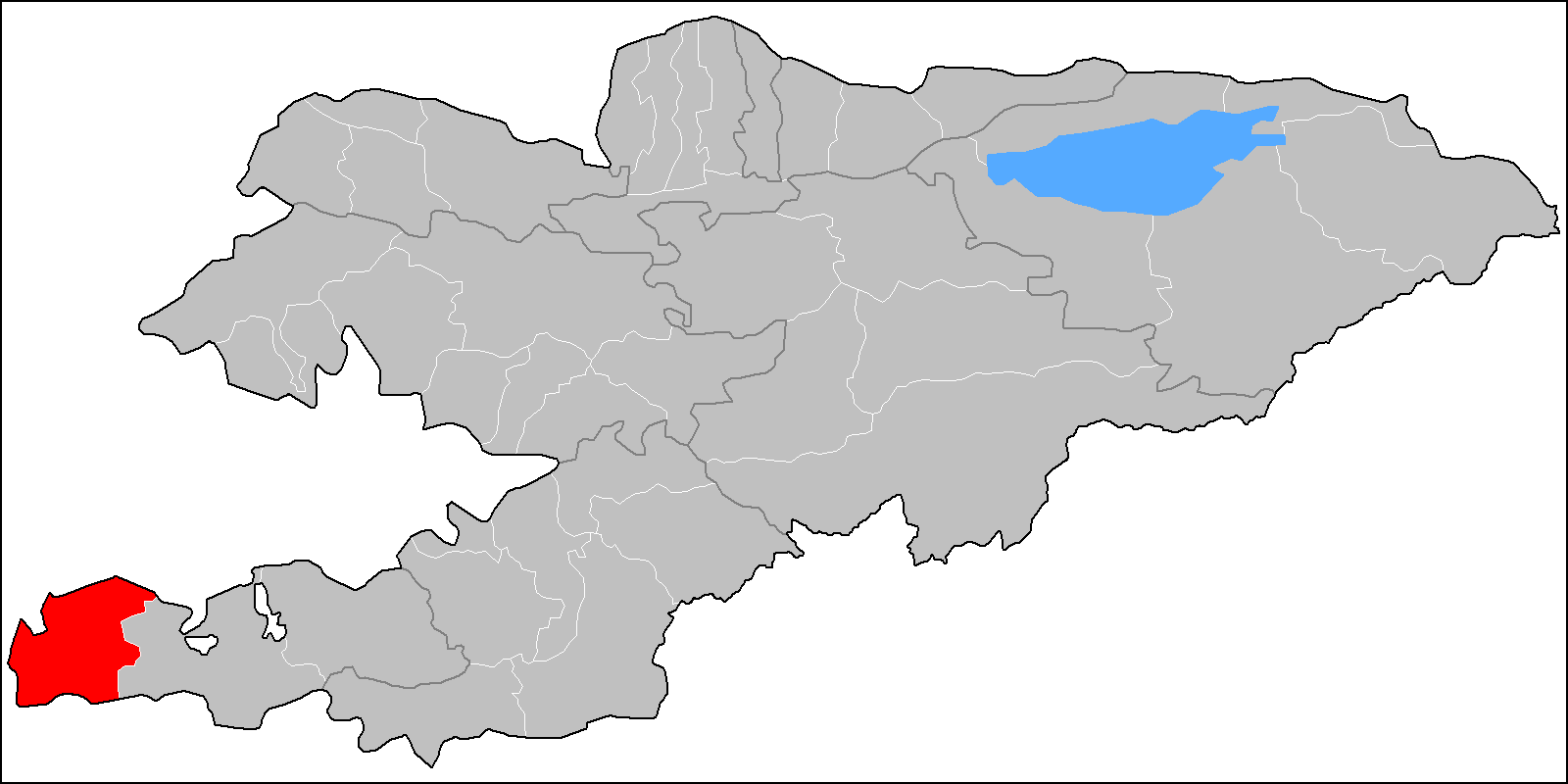
Leilek District (in red) in Kyrgyzstan

On 1 May, the President of Kyrgyzstan Sadyr Japarov signed a decree that declares a two-day nationwide mourning, accusing Tajikistan of building-up troops and military equipment on the border. The Kyrgyz side also accused Tajik forces of opening fire on Kyrgyz vehicles in the area, while a Tajik spokesman speaking from Dushanbe said that the country was sticking to the ceasefire and pull-out of troops. Musurmanbek Tursumatov, representative of the regional administrator of the Batken Region, said that Tajik forces had blocked the Osh-Batken-Isfana road to Vorukh despite the ceasefire coming into effect. That same day both countries also agreed to a new ceasefire, following minor new border clashes, which included withdrawing troops from the border. Russian Foreign Minister Sergei Lavrov urged both countries to honor the new agreement.

On 2 May, around 33,388 civilians in Kyrgyzstan were evacuated from the Batken Region near the border. The Kyrgyz Ministry of the Interior and Tajikistan reported that the situation at the border as stable and calm. Nonetheless, an unexploded air-to-land rocket was later discovered at a house near the border in Batken.

On 3 May, both countries completed the withdrawal of troops from the border. The President of Tajikistan Emomali Rahmon also ordered that all residential buildings destroyed in Chorku be restored. On 6 May, the Ministry of Emergency Situations reported that 136 houses and 84 facilities in the Batken region had been destroyed. On 10 May, citizens in the Batken region returned home for the first time since evacuating the region. On 18 May, officials in both countries announced that they had agreed to joint security controls along the disputed border.

=== Post-ceasefire ===
==== July ====
On 9 July, despite the ceasefire, a clash between Tajik and Kyrgyz border guards killed one Kyrgyz serviceman. According to the Kyrgyz side, their patrol unit on horseback was fired upon by the Tajiks in Leylek.

== Casualties ==
During the four-day conflict, at least 55 people were confirmed killed: 36 died in Kyrgyzstan and 19 in Tajikistan. At least 163 people were wounded in Kyrgyzstan. More than 33,000 people had been evacuated from the area where fighting was taking place.

The Kyrgyz Ministry of Health and Social Development stated that overall both military and civilian were killed in the clashes. It also stated that most of the dead and wounded were civilians. Some of the civilian deaths occurred when Kyrgyz villagers fled their homes in panic under Tajik mortar fire. Among the killed were a sixth-grader girl and her mother, who, according to Kyrgyz reports, were shot. On 3 May, the death toll for Kyrgyzstan reached to 36 after a 4-year-old boy named Abidin Tursunbaev was killed. Tajikistan also admitted that there are deaths on their side in clashes. On 4 May, the number of Tajiks killed at the border increased to 19, including eight border guards and one OMON (special police unit) officer. On 5 May, the death toll during the clashes reached to 55. On 27 January 2022, clashes resumed that resulted in the deaths of 2 people, further adding to the number of casualties.

== War crimes ==
On 30 April 2021, Human Rights Watch reported that armed Tajiks in civilian clothing had burned down all 17 houses in the Kyrgyz village of Kok-Terek, and 135 houses in Marksat, Arka, International and other 2 villages were destroyed and burnt by Tajik military. The local unprotected population was under mortar and artillery fire. Leilek District. The Kyrgyz authorities also stated that a school was burned. On 2 May, the Kyrgyzstan Interior Ministry launched 11 criminal probe investigations into the events on the border. On 3 May, the prosecutor general's office of Tajikistan launched a criminal investigation into servicemen and citizens of Kyrgyzstan for "unleashing an aggressive war". The Kyrgyz Prosecutor General's Office filed a case on the crime against the peace on 30 April and accused the Tajikistan Armed Forces of invading the country and seizing their sovereign territory.

== International reactions ==
=== UN-member states ===
- Russia: The Russian Ministry of Foreign Affairs declared the need that the governments of Kyrgyzstan and Tajikistan reach a lasting agreement to prevent new border clashes. It called on the parties to "achieve, through negotiations in the spirit of partnership and good neighbour policy, a sustainable and lasting agreement that will normalize the situation and take measures to prevent such incidents." Neighbouring Uzbekistan offered to assist in mediating the conflict. Turkey also said that it would provide assistance to both countries.
- Kazakhstan: President of Kazakhstan Kassym-Jomart Tokayev, in a phone conversation with Kyrgyz President Sadyr Japarov, offered condolences in connection with human losses as a result of the conflict.
- Iran: Iranian Foreign Ministry Spokesman Saeed Khatibzadeh stated that Iran is worriedly following fighting between the two friendly and brotherly countries of Tajikistan and Kyrgyzstan and offer assistance to advance negotiations.
- Afghanistan: Afghan TV channel 1TV shared on its Twitter account the Afghan Foreign Ministry's statement expressing concern over the border clashes and calls for dialogue.
- Pakistan: Pakistan also lauded the ceasefire.

=== Supranational organizations ===
The European Union welcomed the ceasefire agreement reached on 30 April, and expressed regret over the violence, as well as sympathy to those who had lost relatives or friends.

The Secretary-General of the Turkic Council Baghdad Amreyev stated that "... the Turkic Council calls on the parties to continue exercising caution and take joint measures to stabilize the situation by refraining from any actions that may lead to further escalation of tension", and added it will continue maintaining its close contact with the "Government of brotherly Kyrgyzstan", a founding member of the Turkic Council.

=== Non-governmental ===
Kyrgyzstanis in Germany and the United Kingdom organized rallies and protests at Tajikistani embassies. Additionally, citizens living in San Francisco protested in support of Batken and call for international institutions to bring President Rahmon to justice.

== See also ==
- Kyrgyzstan–Tajikistan relations
- 2022 Kyrgyzstan-Tajikistan clashes
