= Gulafzo Savriddinova =

Tajikistan politician

Gulafzo Savriddinova (born 11 September 1947 Isfara, Tajikistan) is a Tajik politician. She graduated from the Agricultural University of Moscow (1969) and the High Political School of Tashkent (1985). She started working as an economist in Shurob in 1969. Gulafzo Savriddinova also served as the head of the Labor Union, as well as serving as a head of the Communist Party and mayor of Isfara District.
