= Lolazor =

Lolazor may refer to the following places in Tajikistan:

- Lolazor, Danghara District, a jamoat in Danghara District, Khatlon Region
- Lolazor, Devashtich District, a village in Devashtich District, Sughd Region
- Lolazor, Jabbor Rasulov District, a village in Jabbor Rasulov District, Sughd Region
