= Kyrgyzstan–Tajikistan clashes =

Kyrgyzstan–Tajikistan clashes may refer to:

- 2021 Kyrgyzstan–Tajikistan clashes
- 2022 Kyrgyzstan–Tajikistan clashes
