= 2022 Kyrgyzstan–Tajikistan clashes =

- Part of the post-Soviet conflicts
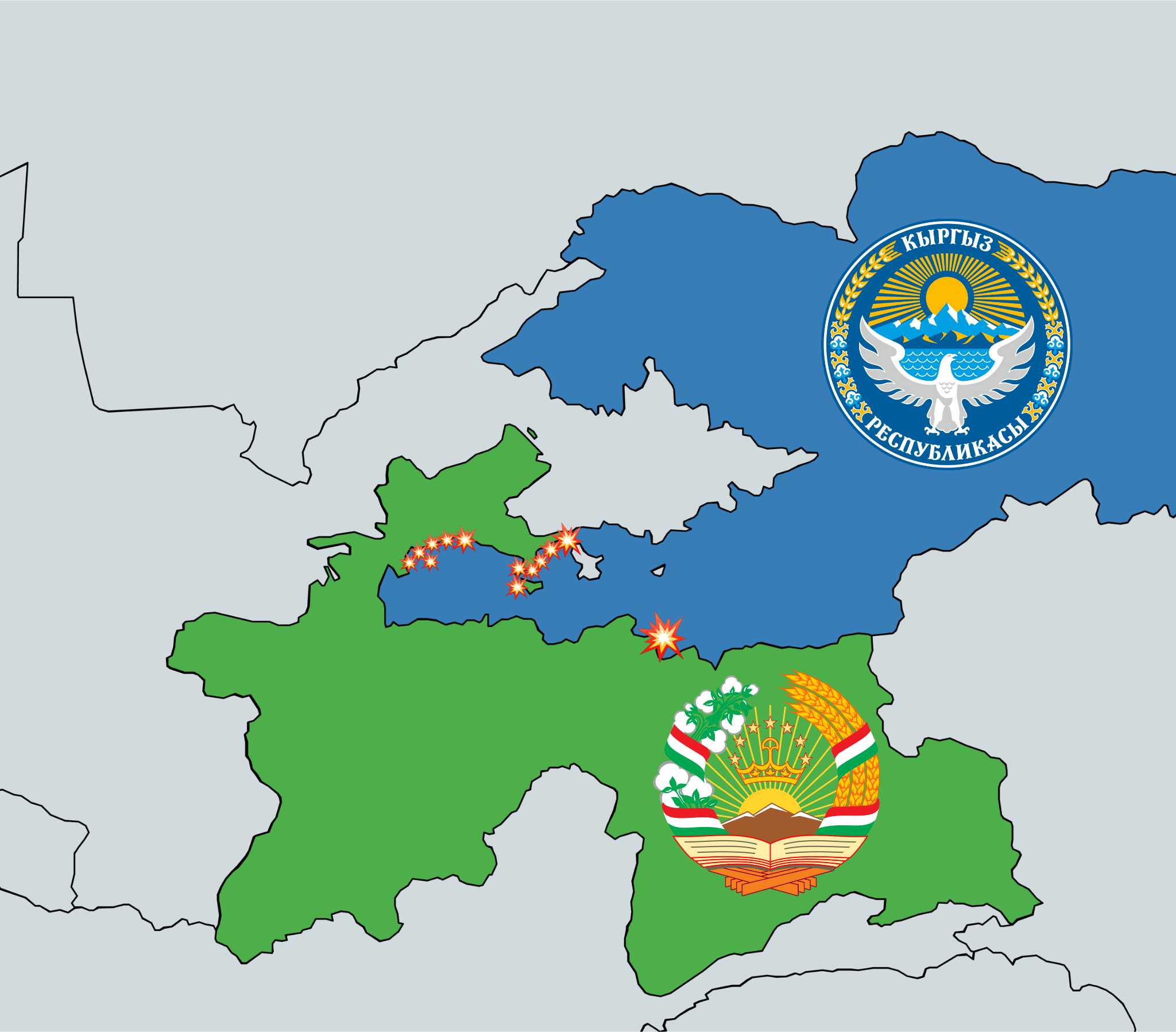
- Map showing areas where clashes broke out within Kyrgyzstan
Date	27 January 2022; 10 March 2022; 3 June 2022; 14 June 2022; 14–20 September 2022
Location	Kyrgyzstan–Tajikistan border
Result	Status quo ante bellum

Belligerents
Tajikistan; Afghan mujahids (per Kyrgyzstan)	Kyrgyzstan

Commanders and leaders
Emomali Rahmon; Saimumin Yatimov; Sherali Mirzo; Shokh Iskandarzoda	Sadyr Japarov: Kamchybek Tashiev; Baktybek Bekbolotov

Units involved
Armed Forces of Tajikistan; State Committee for National Security; OMON	Kyrgyz Armed Forces; State Committee for National Security; Border Guard Service; Scorpion 25th SFB; BSF "Börü"

Casualties and losses
83 killed (per RFE/RL); 200+ killed, 400+ injured (per Kyrgyzstan) 250+ killed (per ISloH)	63 killed
- 139 wounded 136,000 evacuated

A series of sporadic border clashes resumed between Kyrgyzstan and Tajikistan on 27 January 2022, following a series of clashes in 2021 between the two countries.

Kyrgyzstan officials said that the clashes escalated on 14 September 2022, with Tajik forces using tanks, APCs, and mortars to enter at least one Kyrgyz village and shelling the airport of the Kyrgyz town of Batken and adjacent areas. Both nations blamed each other for the fighting. The border conflict continued for two days, after which the parties were able to agree to a ceasefire on the night of 16 September 2022, which only held for about a day.

Kyrgyzstan's President Sadyr Japarov said in a televised address that his country would continue efforts to resolve the Kyrgyz–Tajik border issues in a purely peaceful way. Tajikistan's foreign ministry stated that the key to resolving the conflict lay in negotiations, and it reiterated its position that Kyrgyzstan had instigated the fighting. Russian news agencies reported that both Kyrgyzstan and Tajikistan had agreed to pull out additional military hardware and forces from the border, citing a statement from the head of the Sughd Region of Tajikistan. On 20 September 2022, Tajikistan and Kyrgyzstan signed a peace deal.

== Background ==
=== Historical context ===
The territories that comprise present-day Kyrgyzstan and Tajikistan, both formerly part of the Uzbek Khanate of Kokand, were conquered by the Russian Empire in the 19th century. In the 1920s, the Soviet Union imposed delimitation in the two regions which resulted in enclaves. Both countries became independent in 1991 when the Soviet Union dissolved. Both countries are also members of the Shanghai Cooperation Organization (SCO) and Collective Security Treaty Organization (CSTO), and are theoretically allied to each other.

=== Previous clashes ===
A border conflict started between Kyrgyzstan and Tajikistan on 28 April 2021. The events surrounding the conflict's outbreak are disputed, but clashes reportedly began due to an old water dispute between the two countries, near the Vorukh enclave.

On 3 May 2021, both countries completed the withdrawal of troops from the border, and on 18 May 2021, officials in both countries announced that they had agreed to joint security controls along their disputed border. Apart from a small-scale incident on 9 July 2021, the ceasefire held until January 2022.

== Timeline ==
=== Sporadic clashes ===
On 27 January 2022, clashes resulted in the deaths of two Tajik civilians and the wounding of several more on both sides of the contested border. Tajikistan's State Committee for National Security said in a statement that ten of its citizens were injured, six of them servicemen, the rest civilians. On the other side, Kyrgyzstan's Health Ministry said that at least 11 of its citizens were being treated for moderately serious injuries. Kyrgyzstan authorities stated that the blocking of a road between the provincial center of Batken and the Kyrgyz village of Isfana by Tajik citizens was the cause of the clashes.

On 10 March, an armed incident between border guards at the Kyrgyzstan–Tajikistan border, in the area of Teskey, Batken District, killed a Tajik border guard. Following the incident, officials from the Batken Region in Kyrgyzstan and the Sughd Region in Tajikistan held talks.

According to Tajik sources, a border clash occurred on 3 June after Kyrgyz soldiers crossed the Kyrgyzstan–Tajikistan border close to Vorukh. Two weeks later, on 14 June, a Tajik border guard was killed and three others injured in a clash with Kyrgyz border troops.

=== Escalation ===
On 14 September, one Tajik border guard was killed and two others were wounded during clashes with Kyrgyz guards who accused Tajikistan of taking positions in a demarcated area. Later the same day, two border guards were reported killed and eleven others wounded, five of whom were civilians.

On 16 September, the conflict escalated. The use of tanks and armored personnel carriers was reported, as well as the shelling of the Batken Airport in the city of Batken, Kyrgyzstan. Tajikistan accused Kyrgyzstan of shelling an outpost and seven border villages with heavy weapons. Tajik forces also entered a Kyrgyz border village. At least 31 injuries were reported by Kyrgyzstan, while one civilian was killed and three others were injured according to Tajik forces in Isfara, and Kyrgyzstan later announced 24 people had died and 87 more were injured.

Multiple ceasefires between increasingly higher-ranking officials have been reached but have repeatedly been broken. Coincidentally, the leaders of both countries were attending the 2022 SCO summit of the Shanghai Cooperation Organisation held in Samarkand, Uzbekistan, where they met and discussed the conflict. The Kyrgyz Parliament held an emergency meeting due to the situation. More than 136,000 people were evacuated from the conflict zone by Kyrgyzstan. Tajikistan said that 1 tank destroyed and 15 of its civilians were killed in a Kyrgyz Bayraktar TB2 drone strike on a mosque.

Houses and civilian structures, including markets and schools, in the village of Ak-Sai in Kyrgyzstan were reported to have been intentionally burned and looted. Kyrgyzstan authorities said that 137,000 people had been evacuated to the Batken and Osh regions.

== Analysis ==
The Diplomat called the conflict an act of aggression by Tajikistan. It said that the attack could be related to speculation that Tajik President Emomali Rahmon plans to hand over his position to his son Rustam Emomali, who is currently the Chairman of the National Assembly of Tajikistan. It also theorized that President Rahmon might wish to pull the attention of domestic and international audiences away from protests in the Gorno-Badakhshan Autonomous Region by the Pamiris.

== International reactions ==
Iranian Ministry of Foreign Affairs spokesman Nasser Kanaani called for a resolution and offered Iran's assistance in mediation.

Russian president Vladimir Putin called the leaders of both Kyrgyzstan and Tajikistan, urging them to reach a peace agreement. Russia has military bases in both countries.

The Turkish Ministry of Foreign Affairs issued a statement hoping that the tension ends quickly without further escalation and that the disputes are settled peacefully through dialogue. Mustafa Şentop, the Speaker of Turkish Parliament, spoke on the phone with his Kyrgyz and Tajik counterparts, stating that "consultations between us as brothers are important in these days" and that "calm and common sense" are needed to solve the problems.

United Nations Secretary-General António Guterres called for a "dialogue for a lasting ceasefire" between the combatants.

== See also ==
- 2021 Kyrgyzstan–Tajikistan clashes – 2021 conflict between Kyrgyzstan and Tajikistan
- Kyrgyzstan–Tajikistan relations
