= Nail Galimov =

Russian footballer (1966–2024)

Personal information
- Full name: Nail Khamatkhasanovich Galimov
- Date of birth: 6 March 1966
- Place of birth: Shurab, Isfara District, Lenindabad Oblast, Tajik SSR, USSR
- Date of death: 28 July 2024 (aged 58)
- Place of death: Chita, Zabaykalsky Krai, Russia
- Height: 1.74 m (5 ft 9 in)
- Position: Forward

Youth career
- DYuSSh-2 Shurab

Senior career*
Years	Team	Apps	(Gls)
1984	FK Khujand	31	(6)
1985–1991	Lokomotiv Chita	184	(88)
1991–1992	Bug Wyszków		
1992	Lokomotiv Chita	15	(8)
1993	Luch Vladivostok	31	(6)
1994–2002	Lokomotiv Chita	262	(120)

Managerial career
- 2003–2006: Chita (assistant)
- 2006: Chita (caretaker)
- 2007–2014: Chita (assistant)
- * Club domestic league appearances and goals

Nail Khamatkhasanovich Galimov (Russian: Наиль Хаматхасанович Галимов; 6 March 1966 – 28 July 2024) was a Russian-Tajikistani professional football coach and a player. He is the all-time second best scorer of the Russian First Division with 127 goals, behind Yevgeni Alkhimov. Galimov died in Chita, Zabaykalsky Krai, Russia on 28 July 2024, at the age of 58.
