= Kan, Kyrgyzstan =

Kan Kyrgyz: Кан
- Location within Kyrgyzstan
- Coordinates: 39°45′40″N 71°1′20″E
- Country: Kyrgyzstan
- Region: Batken Region
- District: Batken District
- Elevation: 1,824 m (5,984 ft)

Population (2021)
  - Total: 661
- Time zone: UTC+6

Kan (Kyrgyz: Кан) is a village in the Batken Region of Kyrgyzstan. It is part of the Batken District. It is a mountain village on the upper course of the river Sokh. Nearby towns and villages include Gaz (8 km or 5 mi), Zardaly and Hushyor (11 km or 7 mi). Its population was 661 in 2021.
