= Batken District =

Coordinates: 40°03′N 70°49′E

Batken District Kyrgyz: Баткен району
- District
- Location of Batken District in Kyrgyzstan
- Country: Kyrgyzstan
- Region: Batken Region
- Administrative centre: Batken

Area
  - Total: 5,948 km^{2} (2,297 sq mi)

Population (2022)
  - Total: 98,194
  - Density: 16.51/km^{2} (42.76/sq mi)
- Time zone: UTC+6 (KGT)

Batken District (Kyrgyz: Баткен району) is a district of Batken Region in southwestern Kyrgyzstan. Its administrative centre is the city of Batken, which is administratively separate from the district. The district covers 5,948 square kilometres (2,297 sq mi) and had a resident population of 98,194 at the 2022 census.

The district borders Uzbekistan and Tajikistan. As of the 2025 administrative-territorial classification, it comprises 48 villages in seven rural communities.

== Geography ==
Batken District occupies the central part of Batken Region. It borders Tajikistan to the north and south, Leylek District to the west, Kadamjay District to the east, and Chong-Alay District of Osh Region to the southeast. The Uzbek exclave of Sokh lies in the eastern part of the district's geographical area, while the Tajik exclave of Vorukh lies in its central part.

The district encompasses the Batken valley, several smaller valleys extending from north to south, the gorges of the Sokh and Isfara rivers, and the northern slopes of the Alay and Turkestan mountain ranges. Its mineral resources include coal, nepheline syenite, limestone, construction materials, oil, natural gas, antimony and mercury.

The Batken depression opens towards the Fergana Valley. Mountainous terrain accounts for approximately 92% of the district's area, while valleys occupy the remaining 8%.

=== Climate and water resources ===
The climate is continental, with moderately cold winters and hot, dry summers. Average January temperatures range from −4.1 °C (24.6 °F) in the valleys to −15 °C (5 °F) in the mountains. Average July temperatures range from 10 °C (50 °F) to 29.2 °C (84.6 °F). Annual precipitation averages 100–200 millimetres (3.9–7.9 in) in the valleys and 300–450 millimetres (12–18 in) in the mountains.

Across Batken Region, precipitation is concentrated in winter and spring, with spring precipitation predominating and dry conditions developing towards the end of summer.

The principal rivers are the Sokh and Isfara. The Tortgul Reservoir was constructed to provide irrigation water. Conditions in the district favour the cultivation of tobacco and melons.

=== Soils and vegetation ===
Light grey soils occur in the foothill valleys, while mountain slopes have dark grey, grey forest and mountain meadow soils. Uncultivated valley land supports desert-steppe vegetation, including wormwood and thorny plants. Willows, poplars and shrubs grow along watercourses. Northern mountain slopes support wormwood-dominated and ephemeral semi-desert vegetation, interspersed with fescue and feather-grass steppe.

Juniper and almond woodland occurs above 2,500 metres (8,200 ft). Subalpine and alpine landscapes predominate above 3,000 metres (9,800 ft) and are used as pasture.

=== Natural hazards ===
Mudflows and floods are the most widespread and frequent natural hazards in the district. Heavy rainfall can generate mudflows in the foothills, while outburst floods from high-mountain lakes may affect the Sokh and Isfara valleys. The district is also exposed to earthquakes, landslides, rockfalls and avalanches, with avalanche danger greatest in February and March. Parts of the northern district are susceptible to groundwater flooding.

== Population ==
Historical population
Year	Pop.	±% p.a.
1970	28,553	—
1979	38,434	+3.36%
1989	55,799	+3.80%
1999	77,374	+3.32%
2009	69,591	−1.05%
2021	91,983	+2.35%
2022	98,194	+6.75%
Note: resident population; figures before 2000 include Batken city. Sources:

== Populated places ==
According to the 2025 state administrative-territorial classifier, Batken District comprises 48 villages in seven rural communities (ayyl aymagy). The rural communities and their constituent villages are listed below. The district's administrative centre, Batken, is a separate city of regional significance and is not part of the district.

1. Ak-Tatyr (seat: Ak-Tatyr; includes Ravat, Orto-Boz (formerly Govsuvar), Tashtumshuk and Üch-Döbö)
2. Samarkandek (seat: Samarkandek; includes Jangy-Bak and Pasky-Aryk)
3. Tört-Kül (seat: Jangy-Jer; includes Ak-Ötök, Ak-Turpak, Zar-Tash, Chongara, Chong-Talaa and Chek)
4. Suu-Bashy (seat: Bujum; includes Boz-Adyr, Apkan, Böjöy, Kara-Tokoy, Aygül-Tash and Kara-Bulak)
5. Altyn-Beshik (seat: Tayan; includes Gaz, Kyshtut, Say, Sogment, Charbak, Jangyryk, Tunuk-Suu, Kan, Tabylgy, Kayyngdy, Sary-Talaa and Korgon-Tash)
6. Ak-Say (seat: Ak-Say; includes Kök-Tash, Kapchygay, Ming-Bulak and Ming-Örük)
7. Kara-Bak (seat: Kara-Bak; includes Dostuk, Kyzyl-Bel, Chet-Kyzyl, Zardaly, Dobo, Bay Kara-Bak and Momunov)
Settlements of Batken District
Red markers indicate rural community seats; the white marker indicates Batken, the district administrative centre.
