= Istiqlol (disambiguation) =

Istiqlol is a city in Sughd Region, northern Tajikistan.

Istiqlol may also refer to other places in Tajikistan:

- Istiqlol, Devashtich District, in Devashtich District
- Istiqlol, Jayhun District, in Jayhun District
- Istiqlol, Spitamen, in Spitamen District
- Istiqlol, Shahrinav District, in Shahrinav District
- Istiqlol, Shahriston District, in Shahriston District
- Sarvati Istiqlol, in Kushoniyon District
