= Qal'ai Mirzoboy =

- Location in Tajikistan
- Coordinates: 39°44′23″N 69°9′26″E
- Country: Tajikistan
- Region: Sughd Region
- District: Devashtich District
- Official languages: Russian (Interethnic); Tajik (State) (Note: Constitution of Tajikistan)

Qal'ai Mirzoboy (Russian: Калаи-Мирзобой; Tajik: Қалъаи Мирзобой) is a village in Sughd Region, northern Tajikistan. It is part of the jamoat Vahdat in Devashtich District.
