= Zarhok =

Zarhok Зархок
- Village
- Flag Coat of arms

- Location within Tajikistan
- Coordinates: 40°16′54″N 70°33′59″E
- Country: Tajikistan
- Region: Sughd Region
- City: Isfara
- Founded: 1235

Population (2007)
  - Total: 4,356
- Time zone: UTC+5 (UTC+05)
- Postal code: 735920
- 02: Vehicle code
- Official languages: Russian (Interethnic); Tajik (State)

Zarhok (Russian and Tajik: Зархок Zarkhok) is a village in the Republic of Tajikistan. It is part of the city of Isfara in Sughd Region. It is located in the foothills of the Turkestan Range, on the river Isfara. It is in the centre of the largest fruit and vegetable producing region in Tajikistan.
