= Tortgul Reservoir =

Reservoir in Kyrgyzstan

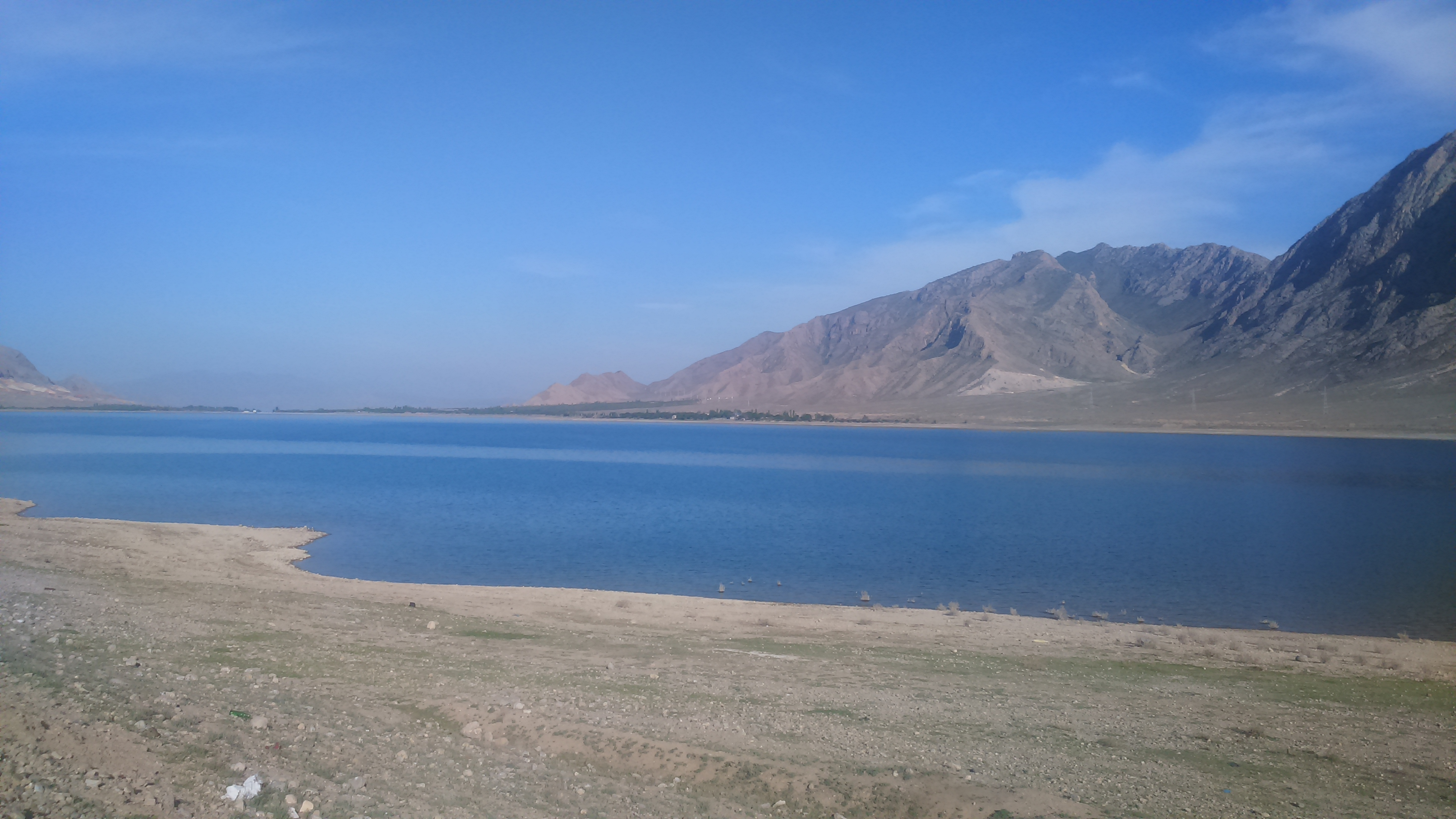
- The Tortgul Reservoir in 2016

- Location within Kyrgyzstan
- Location: Batken District, Batken Region, Kyrgyzstan
- Coordinates: 39°59′34.7″N 70°41′46.8″E
- Primary inflows: Isfara River
- Primary outflows: Isfara River
- Basin countries: Kyrgyzstan and Tajikistan
- Built: 1971–1972
- First flooded: 1975
- Surface area: 6.57 km^{2} (2.54 sq mi)
- Water volume: 90×10^{6} m^{3} (73,000 acre⋅ft)

The Tortgul Reservoir or Tortkul Reservoir (Kyrgyz: Төртгүл / Төрткүл суу сактагычы; Russian: Торткульское водохранилище) is a reservoir on the Isfara River in Batken District, Batken Region of Kyrgyzstan near the border with Tajikistan. The reservoir has two outflow canals, with one flowing into Batken District and the other diverting water back into the Isfara River. It has a maximum surface area of 6.57 square kilometres (2.54 sq mi) and an estimated volume of 0.09 cubic kilometres (0.022 cu mi).

The reservoir was built in 1971 or 1972 and began operation in 1975. The reservoir was designed by the Soviet Water Planning Institute and the Kyrgyz Water Planning Institute in 1968. The following year its operation was approved by the USSR Ministry of Water Resources. Because of its role in regulating the waters of the Isfara river, the Tortgul Reservoir has featured in water disputes between Kyrgyzstan, Tajikistan, and Uzbekistan ever since its completion.
