= Korgon-Tash =

Korgon-Tash Kyrgyz: Коргон-Таш
- Location within Kyrgyzstan
- Coordinates: 39°44′N 70°57′E
- Country: Kyrgyzstan
- Region: Batken Region
- District: Batken District
- Elevation: 1,743 m (5,719 ft)

Population (2021)
  - Total: 95
- Time zone: UTC+6

Korgon-Tash (Kyrgyz: Коргон-Таш) is a mountain village in Batken Region of Kyrgyzstan. It is part of the Batken District. Its population was 95 in 2021. It lies on the upper course of the river Sokh.
