= Oftobruy =

- Location in Tajikistan
- Coordinates: 40°10′N 70°40′E
- Country: Tajikistan
- Region: Sughd Region
- City: Isfara
- Elevation: 797 m (2,615 ft)
- Official languages: Russian (Interethnic); Tajik (State) (Note: Constitution of Tajikistan)

Oftobruy (Russian: Офтобруй; Tajik: Офтобрӯй, also: Aptyuray) is a village in Sughd Region, northern Tajikistan. It is part of the jamoat Navgilem in the city of Isfara.
