= Ak-Tatyr =

Village in Batken Region, Kyrgyzstan

Ak-Tatyr Kyrgyz: Ак-Татыр
- Village
- Location within Kyrgyzstan
- Coordinates: 39°57′36″N 70°29′04″E
- Country: Kyrgyzstan
- Region: Batken Region
- District: Batken District
- Rural community: Ak-Tatyr
- Elevation: 1,181 m (3,875 ft)

Population (2022)
  - Total: 4,219
- Time zone: UTC+6 (KGT)

Ak-Tatyr (Kyrgyz: Ак-Татыр) is a village in the Batken District of Batken Region, Kyrgyzstan. It is the administrative centre of the Ak-Tatyr rural community. Its population was 4,219 in 2022. The village is listed in the state administrative-territorial classifier under SOATE code 41705214812010.

== Geography ==
Ak-Tatyr lies approximately 40 kilometres (25 mi) southwest of Batken, on the road connecting Batken with Razzakov, formerly known as Isfana. It is situated at an elevation of 1,181 metres (3,875 ft) above sea level.

== Population ==
The village had a resident population of 2,525 in 2009, increasing to 4,219 at the 2022 census.

Historical population
Year	Pop.	±%
2009	2,525	—
2022	4,219	+67.1%
Source: Census results.

== Economy and infrastructure ==
The local economy is based mainly on livestock farming and crop cultivation. The village has a secondary school, a library and a medical post.
