= Kattasay and Daganasay Reservoirs Important Bird Area =

The Kattasay and Daganasay Reservoirs Important Bird Area (Russian: Водохранилища Каттасай и Даганасай, Chinese: 卡塔赛和达嘎纳赛水库重点鸟区) comprises two irrigation reservoirs and their surrounds in central Sughd Province in northwestern Tajikistan. Together, they have been identified as a 98 square kilometres (38 sq mi) Important Bird Area (IBA) by BirdLife International.

== Description ==
The IBA is situated on the northern slopes of the Turkestan Range. Daganasay lies some 16 km north-east of Kattasay at a similar altitude of about 1,200 metres (3,900 ft) above sea level. Both reservoirs are oligotrophic. The area has a semi-arid climate with warm summers and mild winters. Annual rainfall is about 400 millimetres (16 in), mainly in spring.

The IBA lies on the Central Asian Flyway and its characteristics of low disturbance, plenty of food and a mild climate attract birds. It is used by migrating waterfowl in autumn and spring, while various species of waterbirds, waders and birds of prey also overwinter there.

=== Daganasay Reservoir ===
Daganasay (39°54′10″N 69°08′45″E) lies 9 kilometres (5.6 mi) to the south of the town of Ghonchi. It has a surface area of 280 hectares (690 acres) when full, a volume of 42 GL and a maximum depth of 18 metres (59 ft). Towards the end of the irrigation season its area is reduced to 35–40 hectares (86–99 acres) and the depth to 3 metres (9.8 ft). Some 132 species of algae have been recorded.

=== Kattasay Reservoir ===
Kattasay (39°50′30″N 68°59′35″E) lies in the Istravshanskaya depression. When full it has an area of 290 hectares (720 acres), a volume of 55 GL and a depth near the dam of 45–48 metres (148–157 ft), falling to a minimum of 18 metres (59 ft). The main source of its water is the small Kattasay River.

== Birds ==
Birds for which the site is important include saker falcons, solitary snipe, European rollers, Hume's larks, sulphur-bellied warblers, wallcreepers, brown accentors, water pipits, fire-fronted serins, crimson-winged finches, red-mantled rosefinches and white-winged grosbeaks.
