= Tayan, Kyrgyzstan =

Tayan Kyrgyz: Таян
- Location within Kyrgyzstan
- Coordinates: 39°54′10″N 71°6′30″E
- Country: Kyrgyzstan
- Region: Batken Region
- District: Batken District
- Elevation: 1,527 m (5,010 ft)

Population (2021)
  - Total: 1,693
- Time zone: UTC+6

Tayan (Kyrgyz: Таян, romanized: Tayan) is a village in Batken Region of Kyrgyzstan. It is part of the Batken District. Its population was 1,693 in 2021.

Nearby towns and villages include Gaz (10 km or 6 mi) and Bujum (40 km or 25 mi).
