= Yakkachinor =

Arabkishlak
- Location in Tajikistan
- Coordinates: 40°11′N 70°35′E
- Country: Tajikistan
- Region: Sughd Region
- City: Isfara
- Official languages: Russian (Interethnic); Tajik (State)

Arabkishlak (also: Yakkachinor) is a village in north-west Tajikistan. It is located in Khonabad jamoat, part of the city of Isfara of Sughd Region.
