= Khoja Tohir =

- Location in Tajikistan
- Coordinates: 40°2′53″N 69°9′1″E
- Country: Tajikistan
- Region: Sughd Region
- District: Devashtich District

Khoja Tohir (Tajik: Хоҷа Тоҳир, formerly Khushtoirijar) is a village in Sughd Region, northern Tajikistan. It is part of the jamoat Yakhtan in Devashtich District.
