= Basmanda =

Basmanda Басманда
- Location in Tajikistan
- Coordinates: 39°41′20″N 69°9′16″E
- Country: Tajikistan
- Region: Sughd Region
- District: Devashtich District

Government
  - Rais: Rahmonqul
- Elevation: 1,500 m (4,900 ft)

Population (2000)
  - Total: 7,000
- Time zone: +5
- Area code: +992

Basmanda (Tajik: Басманда) is a village in Sughd Region, northern Tajikistan. It is part of the jamoat Vahdat in Devashtich District. With a population of nearly 8000, it is one of the largest villages of the district. Basmanda is situated in the foothills of the Turkestan Range.
