= Ismoil Somoni =

Ismoil Somoni may refer to:

- Ismail Samani (died 907), amir of Transoxiana and Khorasan
- Ismoil Somoni Peak, the highest mountain in Tajikistan, and formerly highest in the Soviet Union
- Ismoili Somoni, Sughd, a town in Tajikistan
- Ismoili Somoni, a town in Tajikistan
