= Yakhtan =

Yakhtan Яхтан
- Village and Jamoat
- Location in Tajikistan
- Coordinates: 40°2′13″N 69°6′59″E
- Country: Tajikistan
- Region: Sughd Region
- District: Devashtich District

Population (2015)
  - Total: 15,060
- Official languages: Russian (Interethnic); Tajik (State)

Yakhtan (Russian and Tajik: Яхтан) is a village and jamoat in north-west Tajikistan. It is located in Devashtich District in Sughd Region. The jamoat has a total population of 15,060 (2015). It consists of 7 villages, including Yakhtan (the seat), Khoja Tohir and Lolazor.
