= Dakhkat =

- Location in Tajikistan
- Coordinates: 39°42′23″N 69°15′12″E
- Country: Tajikistan
- Region: Sughd Region
- District: Devashtich District

Dakhkat (Tajik: Даҳкат) is a village in Sughd Region, northern Tajikistan. It is part of the jamoat Rosrovut in Devashtich District.
