= Vahdat, Sughd =

Vahdat
- Jamoat
- Location in Tajikistan
- Coordinates: 39°35′N 69°05′E
- Country: Tajikistan
- Region: Sughd Region
- District: Devashtich District

Population (2015)
  - Total: 31,955
- Time zone: UTC+5 (TJT)
- Official languages: Russian (Interethnic); Tajik (State) (Note: Constitution of Tajikistan)

Vahdat or Vakhdat (Russian: Вахдат; Tajik: Ваҳдат, formerly: Ovchi) is a jamoat in north-west Tajikistan. It is located in Devashtich District in Sughd Region. The jamoat has a total population of 31,955 (2015). It consists of 8 villages, including Qal'ai Mirzoboy (the seat) and Basmanda.
