= Chek, Batken =

Chek Kyrgyz: Чек
- Location within Kyrgyzstan
- Coordinates: 40°06′40″N 70°50′50″E
- Country: Kyrgyzstan
- Region: Batken
- District: Batken

Population (2021)
  - Total: 5,059
- Time zone: UTC+6

Chek (Kyrgyz: Чек) is a village in Batken Region of Kyrgyzstan. It is part of the Batken District. Its population was 5,059 in 2021.

== Population ==
Historical population
| Year | Pop. | ±% p.a. |
|---|---|---|
| 2009 | 3,478 | — |
| 2021 | 5,059 | +3.17% |
Note: resident population; Sources:
