= Sarvan, Tajikistan =

Sarvan
- Location in Tajikistan
- Coordinates: 40.9231°N 70.6600°E
- Country: Tajikistan
- Region: Sughd Region
- District: Asht District

Sarvan (or Sarvak, Sarvaksoi and Sarvaki-bolo) is a Tajik enclave of the Sughd Region surrounded by Uzbekistan. It is located in the Fergana region where Kyrgyzstan, Tajikistan and Uzbekistan meet. Sarvan is located 1.4 km from the Tajik-Uzbek border. Sarvan covers a valley with an area of about 8 km² and has a population of around 150 people. The principal economic activity is agriculture.

== History and territorial conflicts ==
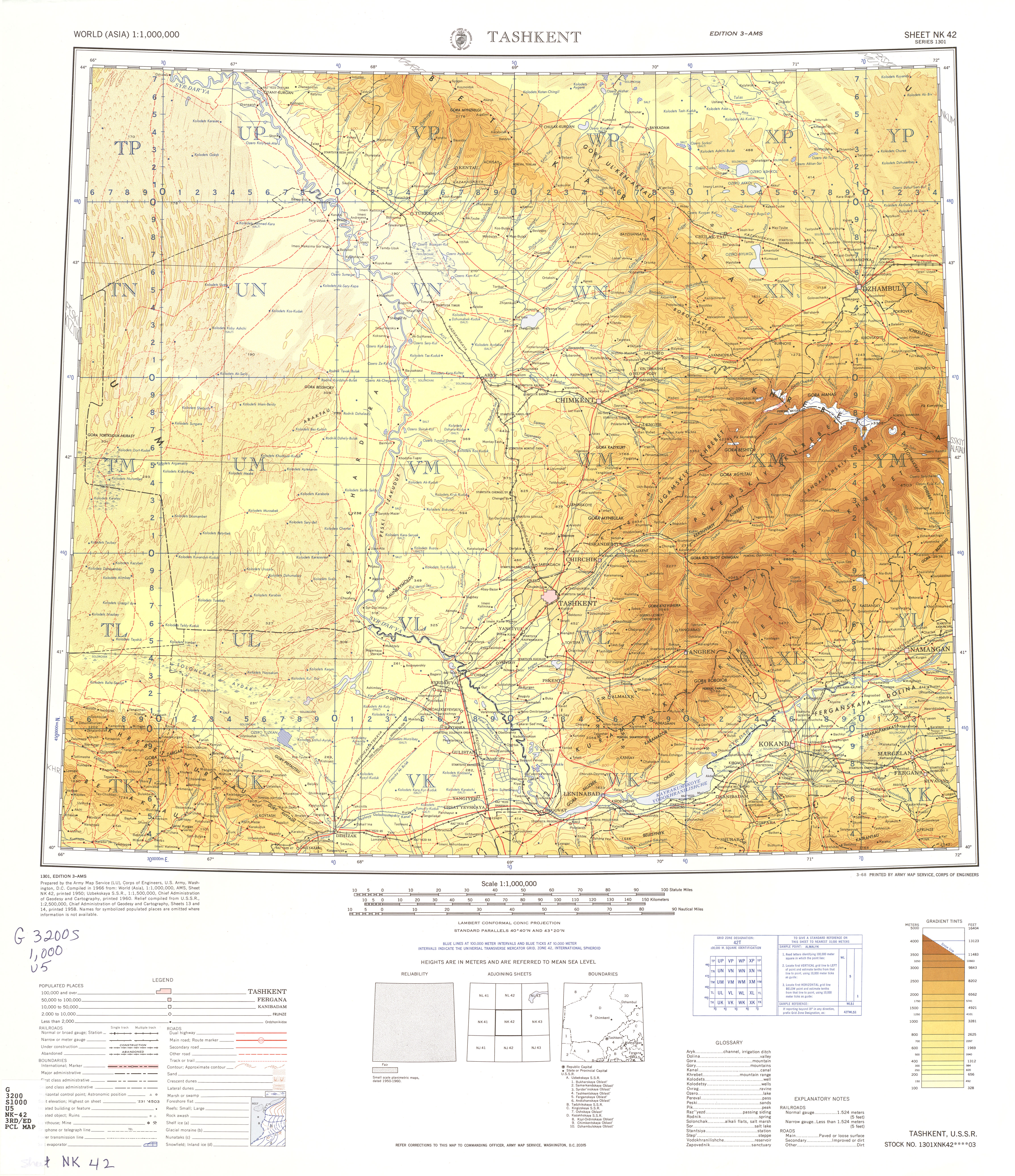
Map including the Sarvan enclave (grid XL)

Due to inherent territorial restrictions, violent conflicts over land ownership, access to pasture, and shared water resources have become more common, as logistical complications within this densely populated and impoverished region have also given rise to economic concern.

The Uzbek-Tajik border near Sarvan was closed in 2004 following terrorist attacks in Tashkent.

== See also ==
- Vorukh, a Tajikistan exclave in Kyrgyzstan
- Kayragach, a Tajikistan exclave in Kyrgyzstan
- Shohimardon, an Uzbekistan exclave in Kyrgyzstan
- Sokh, an Uzbekistan exclave in Kyrgyzstan
