= Orto-Boz =

Village in Batken Region, Kyrgyzstan

Orto-Boz Kyrgyz: Орто-Боз Govsuvar
- Village
- Location within Kyrgyzstan
- Coordinates: 39°57′38″N 70°30′08″E
- Country: Kyrgyzstan
- Region: Batken Region
- District: Batken District
- Rural community: Ak-Tatyr
- Elevation: 1,155 m (3,789 ft)

Population (2022)
  - Total: 1,092
- Time zone: UTC+6 (KGT)

Orto-Boz (Kyrgyz: Орто-Боз), formerly Govsuvar, is a village in the Batken District of Batken Region, Kyrgyzstan. It forms part of the Ak-Tatyr rural community. Its population was 1,092 in 2022.

The village is listed in the state administrative-territorial classifier under SOATE code 41705214812030.

== Geography ==
Orto-Boz is situated at an elevation of approximately 1,155 metres (3,789 ft) above sea level.

== History ==
The village was officially renamed from Govsuvar to Orto-Boz under Article 1 of Law No. 20 of the Kyrgyz Republic, dated 21 January 2025.

== Population ==
The village had a resident population of 762 in 2009, increasing to 1,092 at the 2022 census. In both censuses, it was recorded under its former name, Govsuvar.

Historical population
Year	Pop.	±%
2009	762	—
2022	1,092	+43.3%
Resident population. Sources: Census results.
