= Dalyoni Bolo =

- Village and Jamoat
- Location in Tajikistan
- Coordinates: 39°44′32″N 68°59′40″E
- Country: Tajikistan
- Region: Sughd Region
- District: Devashtich District

Population (2015)
  - Total: 23,670
- Time zone: UTC+5 (TJT)

Dalyoni Bolo is a village and jamoat in north-west Tajikistan. It is located in Devashtich District in Sughd Region. The jamoat has a total population of 23,670 (2015).
