= Zumrad =

Zumrad Tajik: Зумрад
- Jamoat
- Location in Tajikistan
- Country: Tajikistan
- Region: Sughd Region
- City: Isfara

Population (2015)
  - Total: 16,555
- Time zone: UTC+5 (TJT)
- Official languages: Russian (Interethnic); Tajik (State) (Note: Constitution of Tajikistan)

Zumrad (before 2021 — Shahrak; Tajik: Зумрад)is a jamoat in northern Tajikistan. It is part of the city of Isfara in Sughd Region. The jamoat has a total population of 16,555 (2015). It consists of 6 villages, including Shahrak (the seat) and Chordeh.

A Chinese paramilitary base is located near the town.
