= Chordeh =

Chordeh Tajik: Чордеҳ
- Location in Tajikistan
- Coordinates: 40°4′N 70°37′E
- Country: Tajikistan
- Region: Sughd Region
- City: Isfara

Chordeh (before 2021 — Chorqishloq; Tajik: Чордеҳ) is a village in northern Tajikistan. It is part of the city of Isfara in Sughd Region.
