= Nurafshon, Tajikistan =

Nurafshon Russian: Нурафшон Tajik: Нурафшон
- Location in Tajikistan
- Coordinates: 40°12′N 70°28′E
- Country: Tajikistan
- Region: Sughd Region
- City: Isfara

Population (2020)
  - Total: 1,600
- Official languages: Russian (Interethnic); Tajik (State) (Note: Constitution of Tajikistan)

Nurafshon (Russian: Нурафшон, romanized: Nurafshon; Tajik: Нурафшон, romanized: Nurafshon, formerly: Kim) is a town in northern Tajikistan near the Uzbekistan border. It is located in Sughd Region, and is part of the city of Isfara.
