= Zar-Tash =

Zar-Tash Kyrgyz: Зар-Таш
- Location within Kyrgyzstan
- Coordinates: 40°15′0″N 71°1′12″E
- Country: Kyrgyzstan
- Region: Batken Region
- District: Batken District
- Elevation: 747 m (2,451 ft)

Population (2021)
  - Total: 915
- Time zone: UTC+6

Zar-Tash (Kyrgyz: Зар-Таш) is a village in the Batken Region of Kyrgyzstan. It is part of the Batken District. Its population was 915 in 2021.
