= Kara-Bak =

Kara-Bak Kyrgyz: Кара-Бак
- Location within Kyrgyzstan
- Coordinates: 40°09′30″N 70°49′00″E
- Country: Kyrgyzstan
- Region: Batken
- District: Batken

Population (2021)
  - Total: 8,923
- Time zone: UTC+6

Kara-Bak (Kyrgyz: Кара-Бак) is a village in Batken Region of Kyrgyzstan. It is part of the Batken District. Its population was 8,923 in 2021.

== Population ==
Historical population
Year	Pop.	±% p.a.
2009	6,890	—
2021	8,923	+2.18%
Note: resident population; Sources:
