= Samarkandek =

Samarkandek Kyrgyz: Самаркандек
- Location within Kyrgyzstan
- Coordinates: 39°59′40″N 70°32′20″E
- Country: Kyrgyzstan
- Region: Batken Region
- District: Batken District

Population (2025)
  - Total: 8,022
- Time zone: UTC+6

Samarkandek (Kyrgyz: Самаркандек) is a village in Batken Region of Kyrgyzstan. It is the seat of the Samarkandek rural community (айыл аймагы, ayyl aymagy) within the Batken District. Its population was 7,566 in 2022.

Until 2013, the strategic road Batken-Isfana passed through Samarkandek. In 2013, ethnic conflict between enclave of Tajikistan, Vorukh and Samarkandyk led to mutual closing of borders. As Batken-Isfana road passed through Voruh also, government officials started to build a detouring road which would lay entirely in Kyrgyzstan borders. This latter event left Samarkandyk off the road.

== Population ==
Historical population
Year	Pop.	±% p.a.
2009	5,442	—
2022	7,566	+2.57%
2025	8,022	+1.97%
Note: resident population; Sources:
