= Isfara (river) =

Isfara Ak-Suu, Karavshin
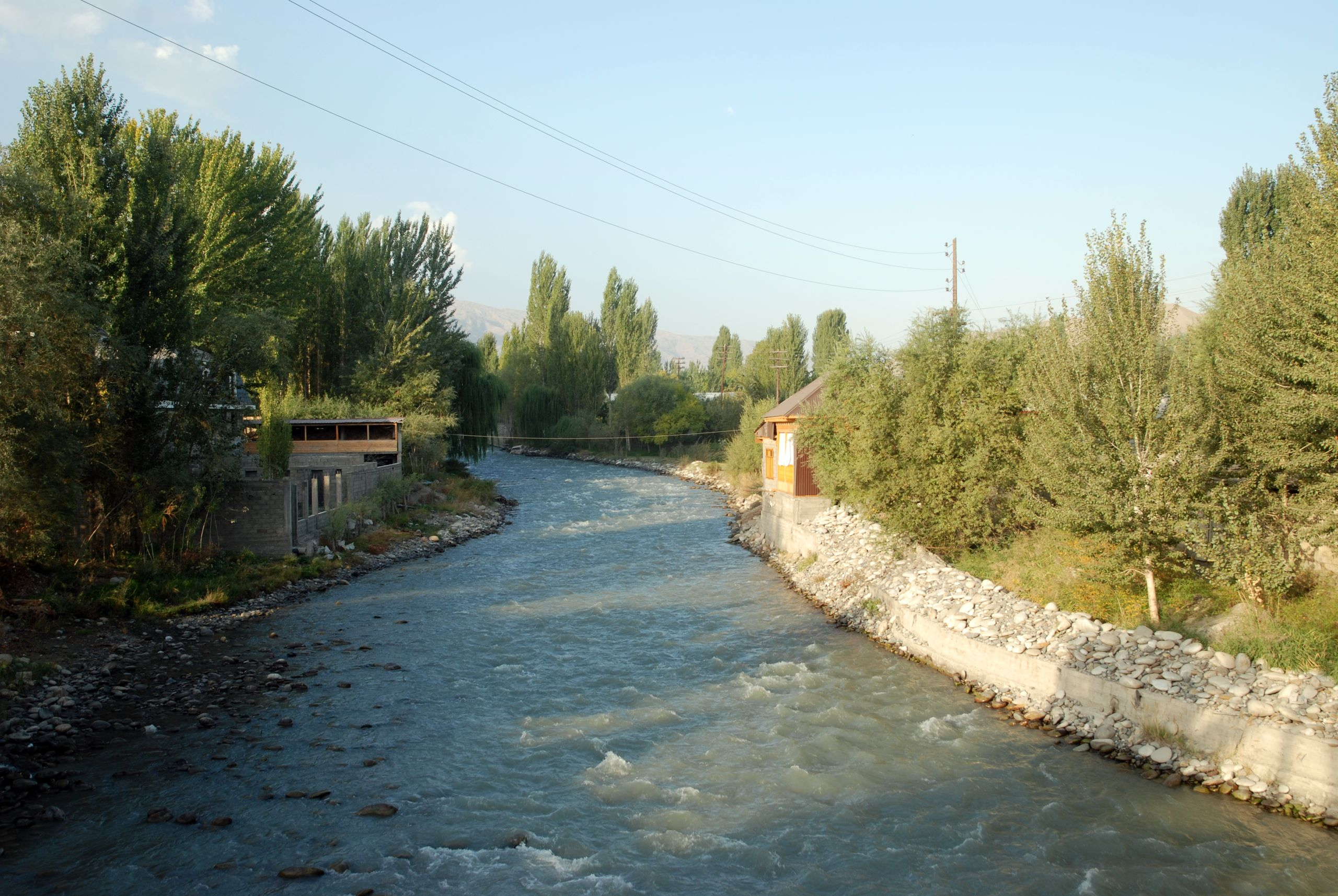
- Isfara in Chorku, Tajikistan
- Native name: Исфара (Kyrgyz) (Tajik)

Location
- Country: Kyrgyzstan, Tajikistan, Uzbekistan
- Region: Batken Region, Sughd Region, Fergana Region

Physical characteristics
- Source: Ak-Suu glacier, the northern slope of the Turkestan Range
  - coordinates: 39°35′17″N 70°17′46″E
- Mouth: near Rabot
  - coordinates: 40°18′46″N 70°33′27″E
- Length: 130 km (81 mi)

The Isfara is a river of the Syr Darya basin in Kyrgyzstan, Tajikistan and Uzbekistan. In its upper course, it is called Ak-Suu, in its middle course Karavshin.

It rises in the Batken Region of Kyrgyzstan. It is fed by the glaciers on the northern flank of the Turkestan Range. It initially flows in a western arc around a foothill chain. It then maintains its course in a northerly direction. It flows through the Tajik exclave of Vorukh. It later crosses the border into the Sughd Region of Tajikistan. There, it flows through the city of the same name in the southwest of the Ferghana Valley. 30 km (19 mi) further north, the river reaches the border with Uzbekistan at Rabot. The Isfara formed an alluvial cone north of Rabot. Today, the incoming river water is directed to the Great Fergana Canal to the northeast.

The Isfara has a length of 130 km (81 mi). It drains an area of 3240 km^{2}. The river is mainly fed by meltwater from the glaciers and snowmelt. 60% of the annual runoff occurs in the summer months from July to September. Some of the river water is diverted for irrigation purposes.
