= Kyzyl-Jol =

Kyzyl-Jol Кызыл-Жол
- Location within Kyrgyzstan
- Coordinates: 40°02′30″N 70°48′30″E
- Country: Kyrgyzstan
- Region: Batken Region
- City: Batken

Population (2021)
  - Total: 6,378
- Time zone: UTC+6

Kyzyl-Jol (Kyrgyz: Кызыл-Жол) is a village in Batken Region of Kyrgyzstan. Administratively, it is part of the city of Batken. Its population was 6,378 in 2021.

== Population ==
Historical population
Year	Pop.	±% p.a.
2009	3,207	—
2021	6,378	+5.90%
Note: resident population; Sources:
