= Gazantarak =

- Village and Jamoat
- Location in Tajikistan
- Coordinates: 39°58′N 69°08′E
- Country: Tajikistan
- Region: Sughd Region
- District: Devashtich District

Population (2015)
  - Total: 17,801
- Time zone: UTC+5 (TJT)

Gazantarak is a village and jamoat in north-west Tajikistan. It is located in Devashtich District in Sughd Region. The jamoat has a total population of 17,801 (2015).
