= Kyrgyzstan–Tajikistan relations =

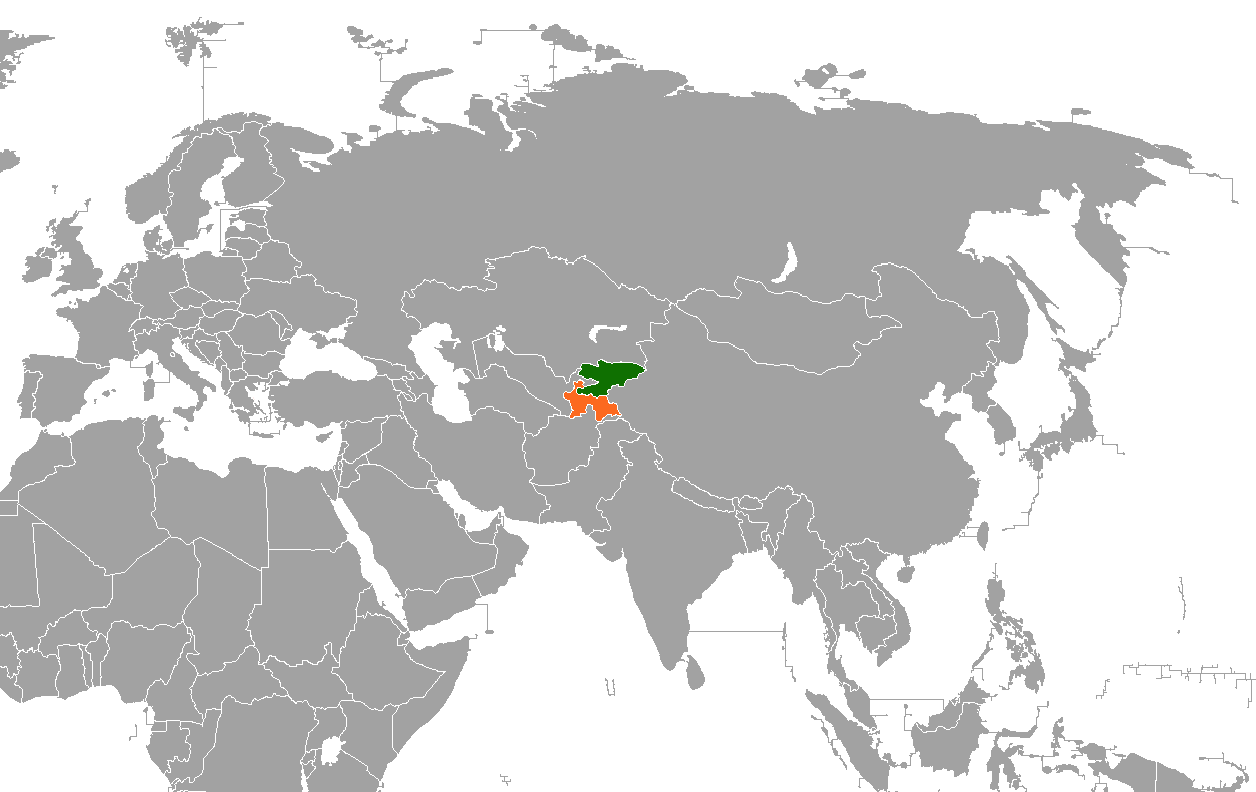

- Kyrgyzstan: Tajikistan

Kyrgyzstan–Tajikistan relations refers to the bilateral diplomatic relations between Kyrgyzstan and Tajikistan. Both countries were a part of the Soviet Union. Kyrgyzstan has an embassy in Dushanbe. and a Tajikistan has an embassy in Bishkek. Kyrgyzstan–Tajikistan relations have been tense in recent years. The two countries fought in border clashes in 2021 and 2022. Refugees and antigovernment fighters in Tajikistan have crossed into Kyrgyzstan several times, even taking hostages.

== Historical relations ==
Kyrgyzstan attempted to assist in brokering an agreement between contesting Tajik forces in October 1992 but without success. Askar Akayev later joined presidents Islam Karimov and Nursultan Nazarbayev in sending a joint intervention force to support Tajikistan's president Emomali Rahmon against insurgents, but the Kyrgyzstani parliament delayed the mission of its small contingent for several months until late spring 1993. In mid-1995, Kyrgyzstani forces had the responsibility of sealing a small portion of the Tajikistan border near Panj from Tajik rebel forces.

The greater risk to Kyrgyzstan from Tajikistan is the general destabilization that the protracted civil war has brought to the region. In particular, the Khorog-Osh road, the so-called "highway above the clouds", has become a major conduit of contraband of all sorts, including weapons and drugs. A meeting of the heads of the state security agencies of Tajikistan, Kyrgyzstan, Kazakhstan, and Uzbekistan, held in Osh in the spring of 1995, also drew the conclusion that ethnic, social, and economic conditions in Osh were increasingly similar to those in Tajikistan in the late 1980s, thus recognizing the contagion of Tajikistan's instability.

== Military relations ==
Beginning on April 28, 2021, a border clash between the two countries broke out, resulting in the death of more than 40 people and displacing 30,000 on the Kyrgyz side. Border clashes erupted again in September 14, 2022, causing at least 94 deaths.

In March 2025, the Kyrgyzstan-Tajikistan border agreement was declared a success after years of negotiations, with both sides reaching compromises on territorial boundaries, water resources, and infrastructure projects. The agreement was approved by Kyrgyzstan's parliament and has garnered broad support for its role in promoting regional stability and peace, despite some domestic opposition.

== Political relations ==
On 21 February 2025, the head of the Kyrgyzstan SCNS Kamchybek Tashiev and the head of Tajikistan SCNS Saimumin Yatimov signed an agreement on the delimitation of the state borders, resolving a decades-old dispute.

On 31 March 2025, Kyrgyzstan and Tajikistan, alongside Uzbekistan, signed the Treaty on the Junction Point of State Borders and the Khujand Declaration on Eternal Friendship during a trilateral summit in Khujand, Tajikistan. The agreements reaffirmed mutual respect for sovereignty and territorial integrity, aiming to strengthen regional cooperation and trust. The summit marked a symbolic shift in Kyrgyz–Tajik relations, particularly after years of border tensions, with the unveiling of a stele at the tri-border junction representing a new era of dialogue and good neighborliness.

== Cultural relations ==
On 24 February 2025, the Central Asian Football Association announced a historic bid between Kyrgyzstan, Tajikistan, and Uzbekistan to bring the Asian Cup to Central Asia for the first time.

== Economic relations ==
The two countries also inaugurated the 500 kV Datka–Sughd transmission line, connecting Kyrgyzstan’s Datka substation with Tajikistan’s Sughd substation. This 485-kilometer line is a major step toward exporting surplus summer electricity to Afghanistan and Pakistan. The CASA-1000 project, launched with support from international financial institutions and valued at over $1.2 billion, is expected to be fully operational by 2027, with the Kyrgyz and Tajik portions completed by 2025. Once online, it aims to deliver up to 5 billion kWh annually, generating significant revenue and deepening regional energy cooperation.

== Presidential visits ==
| Guest | Host | Place of visit | Date of visit |
|---|---|---|---|
| (Tajikistan) President Emomali Rahmon | (Kyrgyzstan) President Askar Akayev | Bishkek | January 1993 |
| (Tajikistan) President Emomali Rahmon | (Kyrgyzstan) President Askar Akayev | Bishkek | May 1998 |
| (Tajikistan) President Emomali Rahmon | (Kyrgyzstan) President Kurmanbek Bakiyev | Bishkek | September 2007 |
| (Tajikistan) President Emomali Rahmon | (Kyrgyzstan) President Almazbek Atambayev | Bishkek | May 2013 |
| (Kyrgyzstan) President Askar Akayev | (Tajikistan) President Emomali Rahmon | Dushanbe | July 1996 |
| (Kyrgyzstan) President Askar Akayev | (Tajikistan) President Emomali Rahmon | Dushanbe | May 2004 |
| (Kyrgyzstan) President Kurmanbek Bakiyev | (Tajikistan) President Emomali Rahmon | Dushanbe | May 2008 |
| (Kyrgyzstan) President Roza Otunbayeva | (Tajikistan) President Emomali Rahmon | Dushanbe | November 2010 |
| (Kyrgyzstan) President Sooronbay Jeenbekov | (Tajikistan) President Emomali Rahmon | Dushanbe | February 2018 |
| (Kyrgyzstan) President Sadyr Japarov | (Tajikistan) President Emomali Rahmon | Dushanbe | June 2021 |

== Resident diplomatic missions ==
- Kyrgyzstan has an embassy in Dushanbe.
- Tajikistan has an embassy in Bishkek.

== See also ==
- Kyrgyzstan–Tajikistan border
- Foreign relations of Kyrgyzstan
- Foreign relations of Tajikistan
