= Gaz, Kyrgyzstan =

Gaz Kyrgyz: Газ
- Location within Kyrgyzstan
- Coordinates: 39°52′10″N 71°01′20″E
- Country: Kyrgyzstan
- Region: Batken Region
- District: Batken District
- Elevation: 2,048 m (6,719 ft)

Population (2021)
  - Total: 2,201
- Time zone: UTC+6

Gaz (Kyrgyz: Газ) is a village in Batken Region of Kyrgyzstan. It is part of the Batken District. Its population was 2,201 in 2021.

Nearby towns and villages include Kan (8 km or 5 mi), Tayan (10 km or 6 mi) and Subash (11 km or 7 mi).
