= Zardaly =

- Location within Kyrgyzstan
- Coordinates: 39°38′40″N 70°57′20″E
- Country: Kyrgyzstan
- Region: Batken Region
- District: Batken District
- Elevation: 1,750 m (5,740 ft)

Population (2021)
  - Total: 260
- Time zone: UTC+6

Zardaly (Kyrgyz: Зардалы) is a village in Batken Region of Kyrgyzstan. It is part of the Batken District. It is a mountain village on the upper course of the river Sokh.
