= Kara-Bulak, Batken =

Kara-Bulak Kyrgyz: Кара-Булак
- Location within Kyrgyzstan
- Coordinates: 39°56′30″N 70°55′50″E
- Country: Kyrgyzstan
- Region: Batken Region
- District: Batken District

Population (2021)
  - Total: 3,725
- Time zone: UTC+6

Kara-Bulak (Kyrgyz: Кара-Булак) is a village in the Batken Region of Kyrgyzstan. It is part of the Batken District. Its population was 3,725 in 2021.
