= Istiqlol, Devashtich District =

Istiqlol
- Location in Tajikistan
- Coordinates: 39°53′N 69°9′E
- Country: Tajikistan
- Region: Sughd Region
- District: Devashtich District

Istiqlol (Tajik: Истиқлол, formerly Itorchi) is a village in Sughd Region, northern Tajikistan. It is part of the jamoat Mujum in Devashtich District.
