= Khonabad =

Khonabad Хонобод (Russian and Tajik)
- Jamoat
- Location in Tajikistan
- Coordinates: 40°12′N 70°36′E
- Country: Tajikistan
- Region: Sughd Region
- City: Isfara

Population (2015)
  - Total: 12,159
- Time zone: UTC+5 (TJT)

Khonabad or Khonobod (Russian and Tajik: Хонобод) is a village and jamoat in northern Tajikistan. It is part of the city of Isfara in Sughd Region. The jamoat has a total population of 12,159 (2015). It consists of 6 villages, including Khonabad (the seat), Zarhok and Arabkishlak (Yakkachinor).
