= Kyzyl-Bel =

Kyzyl-Bel Kyrgyz: Кызыл-Бел
- Location within Kyrgyzstan
- Coordinates: 40°06′00″N 70°44′50″E
- Country: Kyrgyzstan
- Region: Batken
- District: Batken

Population (2021)
  - Total: 7,481
- Time zone: UTC+6

Kyzyl-Bel (Kyrgyz: Кызыл-Бел) is a village in Batken Region of Kyrgyzstan. It is part of the Batken District. Its population was 7,481 in 2021.

== Population ==
Historical population
Year	Pop.	±% p.a.
2009	3,849	—
2021	7,481	+5.69%
Note: resident population; Sources:
