= Ghonchi =

Ghonchi Tajik: Ғончӣ Russian: Ганчи
- Town and Jamoat
- Location in Tajikistan
- Coordinates: 39°57′32″N 69°8′13″E
- Country: Tajikistan
- Region: Sughd Region
- District: Devashtich District

Population (2020)
  - Total: 17,000
- Time zone: UTC+5 (TJT)

Ghonchi, also Ganchi (Tajik: Ғончӣ, Russian: Ганчи), is a town and jamoat in northern Tajikistan. It is the administrative center of Devashtich District, in the central part of Sughd Region. The town's population was estimated at 17,000, as of 1 January 2020.
