= Chilgazi =

Chilgazi Tajik: Чилгазӣ
- Jamoat
- Location in Tajikistan
- Coordinates: 40°09′N 70°44′E
- Country: Tajikistan
- Region: Sughd Region
- City: Isfara

Population (2015)
  - Total: 15,997
- Time zone: UTC+5 (TJT)

Chilgazi (Tajik: Чилгазӣ) is a village and jamoat in northern Tajikistan. It is part of the city of Isfara in Sughd Region. The jamoat has a total population of 15,997 (2015).

== Agriculture ==
Chilgazi is a place where gardening is very much developed. Many fruits as apricots, apples, cherries are produced in Chilgazi. People dry apricots during the summer.

== Education ==
There are several schools in Chilgazi. School 36, 37 55, 66. This jamoat has cinema, two libraries and several tea-houses.
