= Lolazor, Devashtich District =

Lolazor
- Location in Tajikistan
- Coordinates: 40°3′50″N 69°13′3″E
- Region: Sughd Region
- District: Devashtich District

Lolazor (Tajik: Лолазор, formerly: Qizily) is a village in north-western Tajikistan. It is located in Devashtich District, Sughd Region.
