= Rabot, Konibodom =

Rabot Tajik: Работ
- Village
- Location in Tajikistan
- Coordinates: 40.3364687°N 70.5169916°E
- Country: Tajikistan
- Region: Sughd Region
- City: Konibodom
- Jamoat: Pulatan

Population (2017)
  - Total: 2,786
- Time zone: UTC+5 (TJT)

Rabot (Tajik: Работ) is a village located in the Pulatan Jamoat of the city of Konibodom, in the Sughd Region, of Tajikistan. It is 10 km (6.2 mi) from Rabat to the Pulodoni and 13 km (8.1 mi) to Konibodom. Its population was 2786 people in (2017).
