= Bujum =

Bujum Kyrgyz: Бужум
- Location within Kyrgyzstan
- Coordinates: 40°0′36″N 70°49′48″E
- Country: Kyrgyzstan
- Region: Batken
- District: Batken
- Elevation: 1,113 m (3,652 ft)

Population (2021)
  - Total: 11,400

Bujum (Kyrgyz: Бужум) is a village in Batken Region of Kyrgyzstan. It is part of the Batken District. Its population was 11,400 in 2021.

== Population ==
Historical population
Year	Pop.	±% p.a.
2009	7,416	—
2021	11,400	+3.65%
Note: resident population; Sources:
