= Rosrovut =

- Village and Jamoat
- Location in Tajikistan
- Coordinates: 39°38′N 69°17′E
- Country: Tajikistan
- Region: Sughd Region
- District: Devashtich District

Population (2015)
  - Total: 14,419
- Time zone: UTC+5 (TJT)
- Official languages: Russian (Interethnic); Tajik (State) (Note: Constitution of Tajikistan)

Rosrovut (Russian and Tajik: Росровут) is a village and jamoat in north-west Tajikistan. It is located in Devashtich District in Sughd Region. The jamoat has a total population of 14,419 (2015). It consists of 4 villages, including Dakhkat (the seat) and Rosrovut. In June 2005 the village suffered heavy damage from rainfall.
