= Ismoili Somoni, Sughd =

Ismoili Somoni
- Village and Jamoat
- Location in Tajikistan
- Coordinates: 39°45′N 69°09′E
- Country: Tajikistan
- Region: Sughd Region
- District: Devashtich District

Population (2015)
  - Total: 13,970
- Time zone: UTC+5 (TJT)

Ismoili Somoni (Tajik: Исмоили Сомонӣ, formerly: Kalininabad) is a village and jamoat in north-west Tajikistan. It is located in Devashtich District in Sughd Region. The jamoat has a total population of 13,970 (2015).
