= Mujum =

- Village and Jamoat
- Location in Tajikistan
- Coordinates: 39°53′N 69°11′E
- Country: Tajikistan
- Region: Sughd Region
- District: Devashtich District

Population (2015)
  - Total: 27,835
- Time zone: UTC+5 (TJT)

Mujum is a village and jamoat in north-west Tajikistan. It is located in Devashtich District in Sughd Region. The jamoat has a total population of 27,835 (2015). It consists of 10 villages, including Mujum (the seat) and Istiqlol.
