= Kulkand =

Kulkand Russian: Кулканд Tajik: Кӯлканд
- Jamoat
- Location in Tajikistan
- Coordinates: 40°09′N 70°42′E
- Country: Tajikistan
- Region: Sughd Region
- City: Isfara

Population (2015)
  - Total: 22,731
- Time zone: UTC+5 (TJT)

Kulkand (Russian: Кулканд; Tajik: Кӯлканд/کولکند) is a village and jamoat in northern Tajikistan. It is part of the city of Isfara in Sughd Region. The jamoat has a total population of 22,731 (2015).
