= Shurab, Tajikistan =

Shurab Russian: Шураб Tajik: Шӯроб, romanized: Shūrob
- Location in Tajikistan
- Coordinates: 40°02′30″N 70°32′30″E
- Country: Tajikistan
- Region: Sughd Region
- City: Isfara

Population (2020)
  - Total: 2,900

Shurab (Russian: Шураб; Tajik: Шӯроб, romanized: Shūrob) is a town in the Sughd Region, Tajikistan. It is part of the city of Isfara. The population was about 2,900 in 2020.

The town was established in 1952 in Tajik SSR. In Soviet time it had a population of 8,400 (1991), most people worked in coal-mining industry. There were several factories, Palace of Culture, a stadium, a library, a movie theater, a park, etc. The town was supplied by Moscow, wages of local people were higher than in many other Tajik towns, and housing there was considered prestigious by many citizens of the USSR.

After the dissolution of the Soviet Union in 1991, most of the coal mines, factories, culture institutions were closed and the town lost about a half of its population.

As of 2003, the town, with many buildings went to ruins, looked as if there were bombings, water supply system was almost broken, water was supplied to people for about ten minutes a day, a three-room flat there cost about 150 rubles (5 USD).

== Notable residents ==
- Shurab is the birthplace of the decorated gold medal Soviet gymnast Nellie Kim.

== Transport ==
Shurab was the terminus of a branch railway of the former Soviet Railways system.
