= Surkh =

Surkh Сурх (Tajik and Russian)
- Jamoat
- Location in Tajikistan
- Coordinates: 39°59′50″N 70°36′20″E
- Country: Tajikistan
- Region: Sughd Region
- City: Isfara

Population (2015)
  - Total: 14,456
- Time zone: UTC+5 (TJT)
- Official languages: Russian (Interethnic); Tajik (State)

Surkh (Tajik and Russian: Сурх) is a village and jamoat in northern Tajikistan. It is part of the city of Isfara in Sughd Region. The jamoat has a total population of 14,456 (2015).
