= Lolazor, Jabbor Rasulov District =

Lolazor
- Location within Tajikistan
- Coordinates: 40°04′09″N 69°32′46″E
- Country: Tajikistan
- Region: Sughd Region
- District: Jabbor Rasulov District
- Elevation: 727 m (2,385 ft)
- Time zone: UTC +5

Lolazor (Tajik: Лолазор, Persian: لاله‌زار, formerly Қайрағоч Kayraghoch or Kayragach; also known as "Western Qal'acha") is a small exclave of Tajikistan, which is just across the international border inside Kyrgyzstan. Situated 7 km south of Mehrobod (formerly Proletarsk, Tajikistan) and 14 km north of Sulukta (Kyrgyzstan), it is completely surrounded by the Leilek District of Batken Region, Kyrgyzstan. It is near the railway station of Stantsiya Kayragach, on the line from Proletarsk to Sulukta. It is part of the jamoat Gulkhona in Jabbor Rasulov District.

== See also ==
- Sarvan, the Tajikistan exclave in Uzbekistan
- Vorukh, the other Tajikistan exclave in Kyrgyzstan
- Shohimardon, an Uzbekistan exclave in Kyrgyzstan
- Sokh, an Uzbekistan exclave in Kyrgyzstan
- List of enclaves and exclaves
