= Lakkon =

Lakkon Лаккон (Russian and Tajik)
- Town and Jamoat
- Location in Tajikistan
- Coordinates: 40°10′N 70°52′E
- Country: Tajikistan
- Region: Sughd Region
- City: Isfara

Population (2015)
  - Total: 7,579
- Time zone: UTC+5 (TJT)

Lakkon (Russian and Tajik: Лаккон)is a village and jamoat in northern Tajikistan. It is part of the city of Isfara in Sughd Region. The jamoat has a total population of 7,579 (2015).

One of the two largest psychiatric hospitals in Tajikistan is located in Lakkon
