= Navgilem =

Navgilem Навгилем (Russian and Tajik)
- Jamoat
- Location in Tajikistan
- Coordinates: 40°08′N 70°39′E
- Country: Tajikistan
- Region: Sughd Region
- City: Isfara

Population (2015)
  - Total: 38,104
- Time zone: UTC+5 (TJT)

Navgilem (Russian and Tajik: Навгилем) is a village and jamoat in northern Tajikistan. It is part of the city of Isfara in Sughd Region. The jamoat has a total population of 38,104 (2015). It consists of 5 villages, including Navgilem (the seat) and Oftobruy.
