= Batken =

Batken Баткен
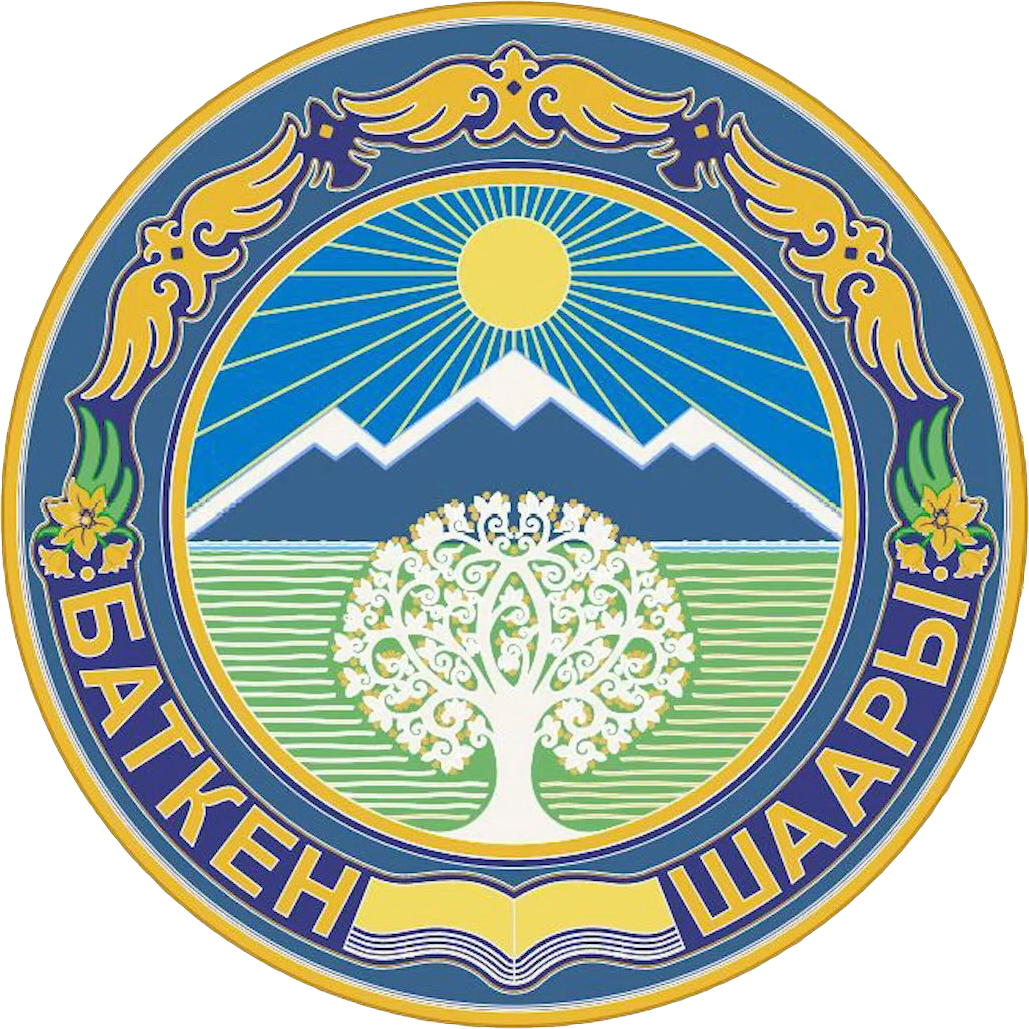
- Flag Seal

- Location in Kyrgyzstan
- Coordinates: 40°4′N 70°49′E
- Country: Kyrgyzstan
- Region: Batken Region

Government
  - Gubernator: Sultanbay Ayjigitov

Area
  - City: 205 km^{2} (79 sq mi)
- Elevation: 1,042 m (3,419 ft)

Population (2021)
  - City: 27,730
  - Density: 135/km^{2} (350/sq mi)
  - Urban: 15,805
- Time zone: UTC+6 (KGT)
- Area code: +996 3622

Batken (also called Batkent) is a town in southwestern Kyrgyzstan, on the southern fringe of the Fergana Valley. It is the administrative seat of Batken Region. Since 2000, it is a city of regional significance, i.e. not part of a district. However, it is still the administrative seat of Batken District. Its area is 205 square kilometres (79 sq mi), and its resident population was 27,730 in 2021 (both including the villages Bulak-Bashy, Kyzyl-Jol and Bazar-Bashy). The population of the town proper was 15,805.

== History ==
The name Batkent is from the Iranian language of Sogdian and means "The city of wind". Batken became the administrative headquarters of the youngest of Kyrgyzstan's seven regions, created from the three westernmost districts of Osh Region in 1999, after concerns over radical Islamist activities in neighboring Tajikistan and Uzbekistan led to demands for a more direct and visible governmental presence in this remote and mountainous region. Batken Airport links the town with Bishkek. Since 2000, there is a small university in Batken.

The 2022 Kyrgyzstan-Tajikistan clashes has heavily damaged the town, which has been subject to shelling. Some residents returned to the city throughout the day from the villages to which they had repaired to avoid the danger of fresh shelling. In the evening, they left again. Most of the shelling and incursions by Tajik troops occurred in places right on the border. On September 16, though, the odd projectile landed on Batken too, despite it lying several kilometers from Tajikistan.

== Population ==
Historical population
Year	Pop.	±% p.a.
2009	19,718	—
2021	27,730	+2.88%
Note: resident population; Sources:

== Climate ==
Batken has a cold steppe climate (Köppen climate classification: BSk), bordering on a Mediterranean climate (Csa) and a continental Mediterranean climate (Dsa). The average annual temperature in Batken is 11.6 °C (52.9 °F). About 367 mm (14.45 in) of precipitation falls annually.

Climate data for Batken
Month	Jan	Feb	Mar	Apr	May	Jun	Jul	Aug	Sep	Oct	Nov	Dec	Year
Mean daily maximum °C (°F)	1.2 (34.2)	3.7 (38.7)	10.5 (50.9)	19.1 (66.4)	24.6 (76.3)	30.0 (86.0)	32.5 (90.5)	31.1 (88.0)	26.4 (79.5)	18.5 (65.3)	9.8 (49.6)	3.4 (38.1)	17.6 (63.6)
Daily mean °C (°F)	−2.8 (27.0)	−0.5 (31.1)	5.8 (42.4)	13.3 (55.9)	18.0 (64.4)	22.6 (72.7)	24.9 (76.8)	23.2 (73.8)	18.3 (64.9)	11.8 (53.2)	4.8 (40.6)	−0.3 (31.5)	11.6 (52.9)
Mean daily minimum °C (°F)	−6.7 (19.9)	−4.7 (23.5)	1.2 (34.2)	7.6 (45.7)	11.5 (52.7)	15.2 (59.4)	17.3 (63.1)	15.4 (59.7)	10.3 (50.5)	5.1 (41.2)	−0.1 (31.8)	−4.0 (24.8)	5.7 (42.2)
Average precipitation mm (inches)	40 (1.6)	39 (1.5)	57 (2.2)	51 (2.0)	47 (1.9)	16 (0.6)	8 (0.3)	3 (0.1)	5 (0.2)	32 (1.3)	30 (1.2)	39 (1.5)	367 (14.4)
Source: https://en.climate-data.org/location/28040/
