= Chorkuh =

Chorku Tajik: Чоркӯҳ نوحیای چورکو Russian: Чорку/Чоркух
- Jamoat
- Seal

- Location in Tajikistan
- Coordinates: 39°58′26″N 70°34′56″E
- Country: Tajikistan
- Region: Sughd Region
- City: Isfara

Population (2015)
  - Total: 37,065
- Time zone: UTC+5 (TJT)

Chorku (Tajik: Чоркӯҳ; Russian: Чорку/Чоркух) is a village and jamoat in northern Tajikistan. It is part of the city of Isfara in Sughd Region. The jamoat has a total population of 37,065 (2015). The Hazrati Shoh mausoleum in Chorku is from the 8th-10th century.

In August 2015, a dispute over a water canal in the area became a controversy between Kyrgyz and Tajiks.
