= Sokh (river) =

The Sokh (Kyrgyz: Сох; Uzbek: Soʻx) is a river in Kyrgyzstan and Uzbekistan, within the Syr Darya basin. It rises in the mountains of southern Kyrgyzstan and flows towards the Fergana Valley, where its waters are diverted for irrigation. The river is 124 kilometres (77 mi) long and drains a catchment of 3,510 square kilometres (1,360 sq mi).

== Course ==
The Sokh rises on the northern slopes of the Alay Mountains, near their junction with the Turkestan Range. It descends through mountainous terrain towards the Fergana Valley. Its largest tributary is the Kojashkan.

In the Fergana Valley, the river forms an extensive alluvial fan crossed by irrigation canals.

== Hydrology ==
The river is fed primarily by snow and glacier melt. Its mean discharge near Sarykanda is 42.1 m^{3}/s (1,490 cu ft/s). High flows occur during the summer melt season.

A 2004 account recorded 276 glaciers in the catchment, covering a combined area of 258.7 square kilometres (99.9 sq mi). It describes the river as having its highest flows in June–August, with discharge declining in September.

== Natural hazards ==
Parts of the Sokh valley are exposed to flooding, mudflows and riverbank erosion. Outbursts of high-mountain lakes in the basin can generate glacial mudflows. Settlements along the river, including Ötükchü and Kyzyl-Korgon, contain areas identified as vulnerable to flooding and bank erosion.

== Water use ==
The waters of the Sokh are extensively used for irrigation in the Fergana Valley. Although the river belongs to the Syr Darya basin, irrigation withdrawals prevent its flow from reaching the Syr Darya.
