= Devashtich District =

Devashtich District Russian: Район Деваштич Tajik: Ноҳияи Деваштич
- District
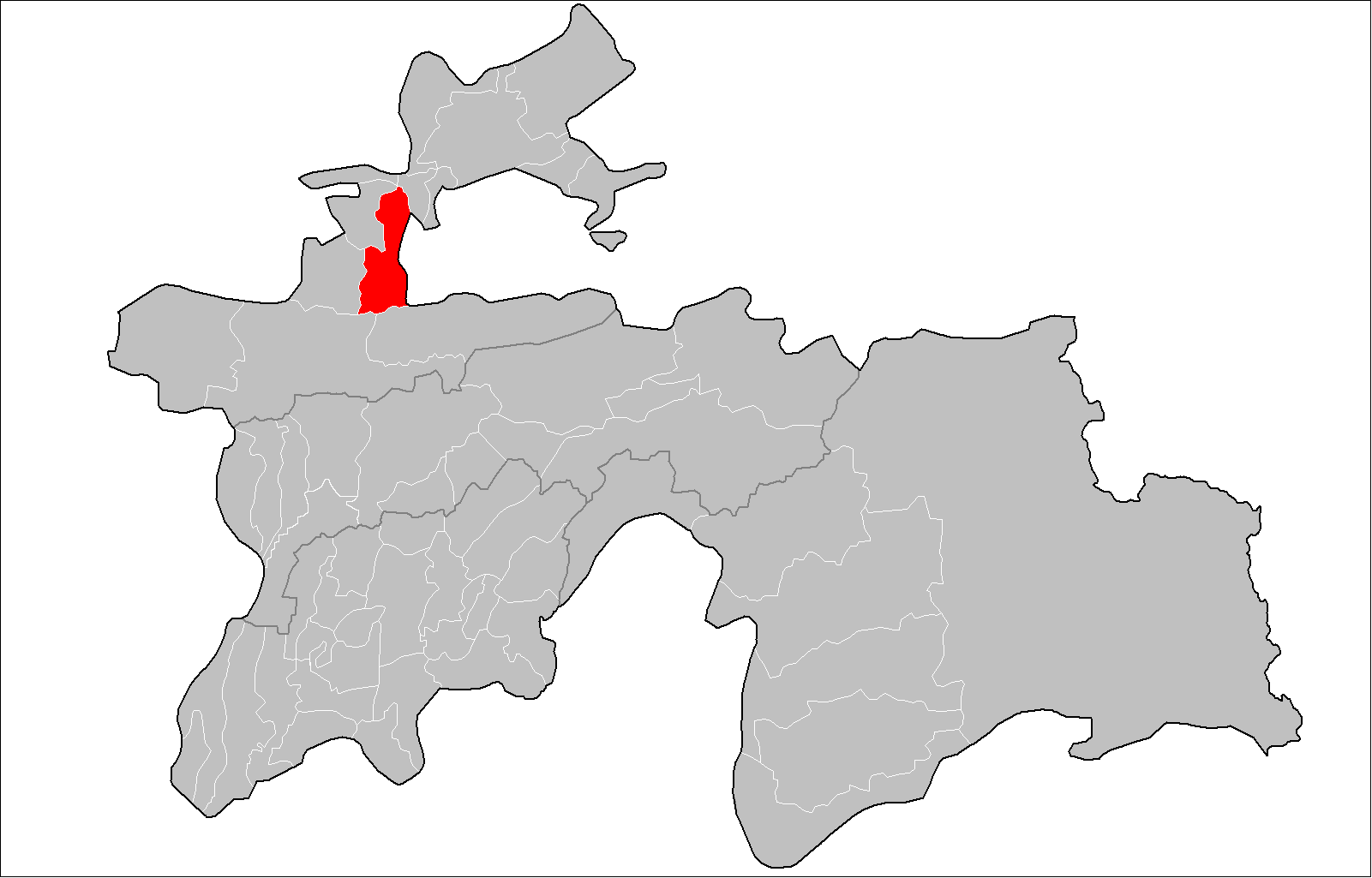
- Location of Devashtich District in Tajikistan
- Coordinates: 39°45′N 69°07′E
- Country: Tajikistan
- Region: Sughd Region
- Capital: Ghonchi

Population (2020)
  - Total: 173,500
- Time zone: UTC+5 (TJT)

Devashtich District (Russian: Район Деваштич; Tajik: Ноҳияи Деваштич; before 2016 Ghonchi District) is a district in the center of Sughd Region, Tajikistan, located south of the regional capital, Khujand and bordering Kyrgyzstan to the east. Its capital is Ghonchi (Ganchi in Russian transliteration). The population of the district is 173,500 (January 2020 estimate).

== Administrative divisions ==
The district has an area of about 1,600 km^{2} (600 sq mi) and is divided administratively into one town and seven jamoats. They are as follows:

Jamoat	Population (Jan. 2015)
Ghonchi (town)	11,800
Dalyoni Bolo	23,670
Gazantarak	17,801
Ismoili Somoni	13,970
Mujum	27,835
Rosrovut	14,419
Vahdat	31,955
Yakhtan	15,060
