= Isfara =

Isfara Tajik: Исфара Russian: Исфара
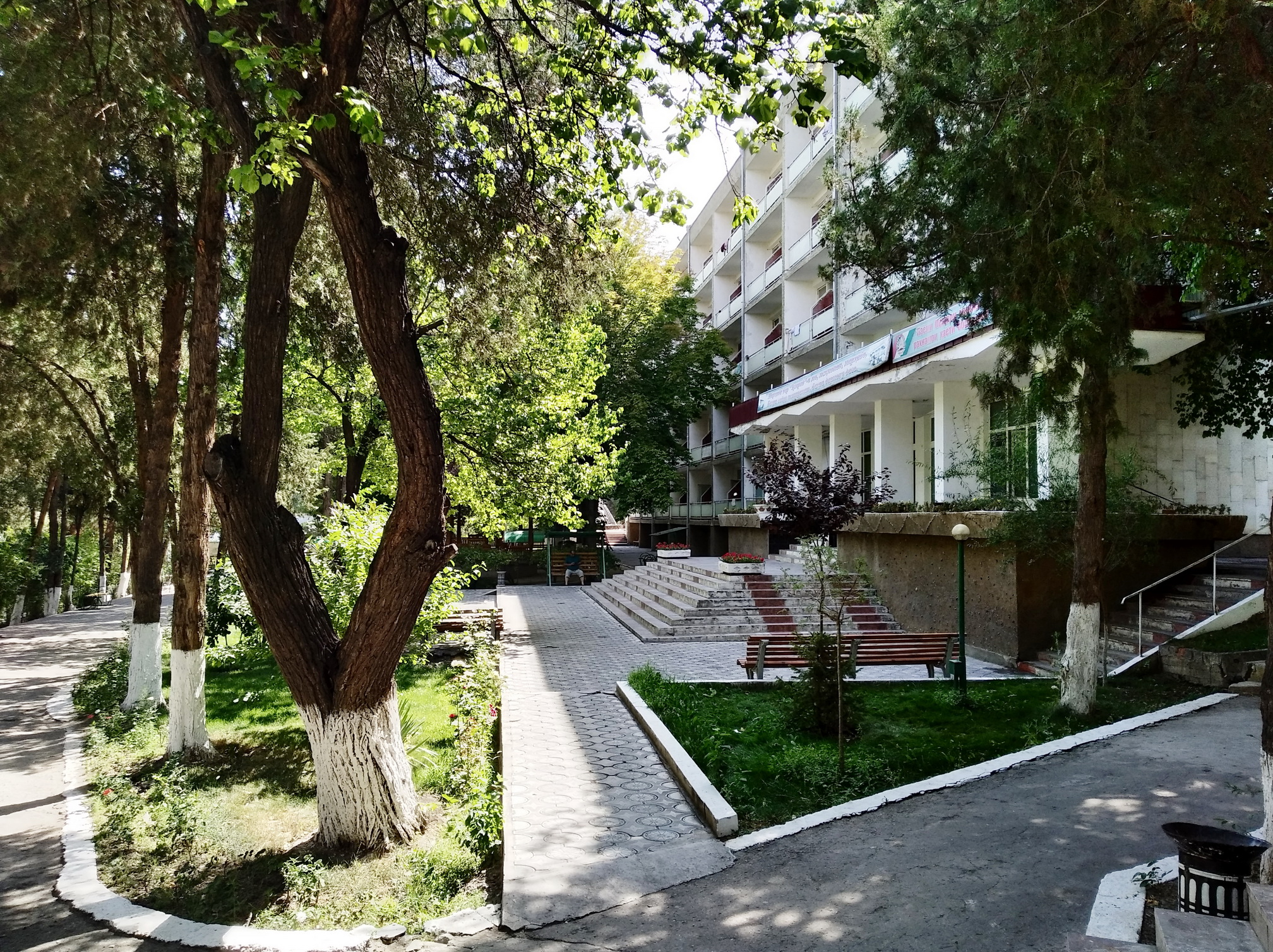
- Sanatorium Zumrad in Isfara

- Location within Tajikistan
- Coordinates: 40°07′N 70°38′E
- Country: Tajikistan
- Region: Sughd Region
- Incorporated: 1933

Government
  - Mayor: Dilshod Rasulzoda

Area
  - City: 832 km^{2} (321 sq mi)
- Elevation: 863 m (2,831 ft)

Population (2020)
  - City: 274,000
  - Urban: 51,700
- Time zone: UTC+5
- Postcode: 735920
- Official languages: Russian (Interethnic); Tajik (State)
- Website: http://isfara.tj

Isfara (Tajik: Исфара; Russian: Исфара) is a city in Sughd Region in northern Tajikistan, situated on the border with Kyrgyzstan. The city was the seat of the former Isfara District.

== History ==
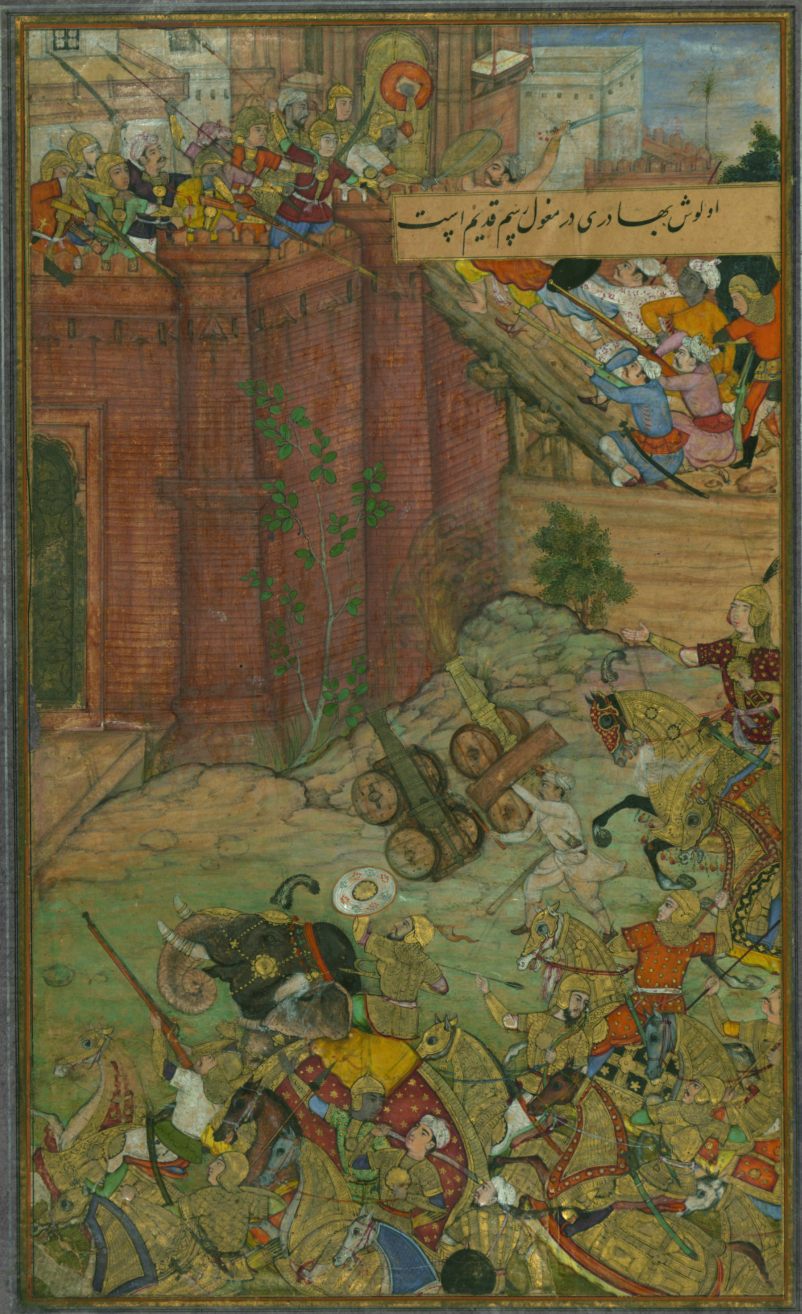
Babur and his army assaults the fortress of Ibrāhīm Sārū, during the Siege of Isfara.

The first author who mentions Esfara as a town, is Bābor. He praised the orchards and fruits of Isfara, especially its almonds. The 16th century saw the construction of large public buildings, notably mosques and medreseh. In the 18th century Isfara was the seat of the Khan of Ḵoqand whose wars with Bokhara resulted in the destruction of some historical monuments.

Around 20 km south, in the village of Chorku, the mausoleum Hazrati Shoh Mausoleum, is carved from wood, partly dating back to the 8th century, a structure that is unique in Central Asia.

== Demographics ==
The population of Isfara is mostly Tajik.

Year	Population	Type
1989	34,500	census
2000	37,000	census
2008	40,600	estimate

== Geography ==
Isfara is situated near the border junction of three independent states Tajikistan, Uzbekistan and Kyrgyzstan, at a height of 863m above sea level. The river Isfara flows through the city. Its territory is 832 km^{2}. The exclave of Vorukh is separated from Isfara by Kyrgyzstan.

=== Climate ===
Typical for lowland Tajikistan, Isfara has a continental Mediterranean climate (Köppen Dsa) with hot, dry summers, chilly winters with significant precipitation, and pleasant springs with the year’s heaviest precipitation. The average temperature is 11.8 °C or 53.2 °F with the warmest month being July with an average temperature of 25 °C or 77 °F and the coldest month being January with an average temperature of −2.7 °C or 27.1 °F. The average annual precipitation is 544.6 millimetres or 21.44 inches and there are on average 74.3 days of precipitation.

Climate data for Isfara
Month	Jan	Feb	Mar	Apr	May	Jun	Jul	Aug	Sep	Oct	Nov	Dec	Year
Daily mean °C (°F)	−2.7 (27.1)	−0.6 (30.9)	6.2 (43.2)	13.6 (56.5)	18.3 (64.9)	22.9 (73.2)	25.0 (77.0)	23.2 (73.8)	18.4 (65.1)	11.9 (53.4)	5.4 (41.7)	0.1 (32.2)	11.8 (53.2)
Average precipitation mm (inches)	56.9 (2.24)	62.6 (2.46)	89.9 (3.54)	83.8 (3.30)	68.3 (2.69)	18.7 (0.74)	10.8 (0.43)	3.0 (0.12)	5.4 (0.21)	43.7 (1.72)	47.1 (1.85)	54.4 (2.14)	544.6 (21.44)
Average precipitation days (≥ 0.1 mm)	7.9	8.5	10.1	9.7	9.0	4.3	2.6	1.5	1.9	5.3	6.1	7.4	74.3
Average relative humidity (%)	74.2	72.3	65.0	58.6	51.4	40.5	39.9	43.0	45.9	55.9	65.1	73.2	57.1
Source: "The Climate of Karakol". Weatherbase.

== Subdivisions ==
Before ca. 2018, Isfara was the seat of Isfara District, which covered the same area as the present city of Isfara. The city of Isfara covers Isfara proper, three towns and nine jamoats. These are as follows:

Jamoat	Population (Jan. 2015)
Naftobod (town)	4,300
Nurafshon (town)	1,600
Shurob (town)	3,000
Chilgazi	15,997
Chorku	37,065
Khonabad	12,159
Kulkand	22,731
Lakkon	7,579
Navgilem	38,104
Shahrak	16,555
Surkh	14,456
Vorukh	30,506

== Economy ==
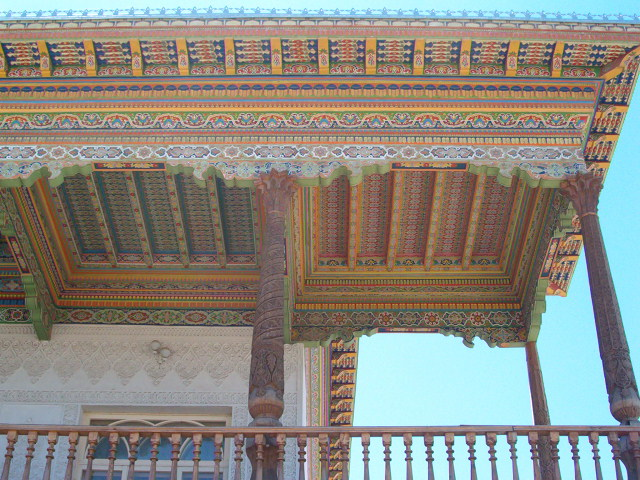
Isfara tea house

Some 20 industrial companies in Isfara produce electrical equipment, chemical and metallurgical products, construction materials, food products and others.

Isfara is famous for its apricot orchards.

== See also ==
- List of cities in Tajikistan
