= Vorukh =

Vorukh Ворух (Russian and Tajik)
- Jamoat
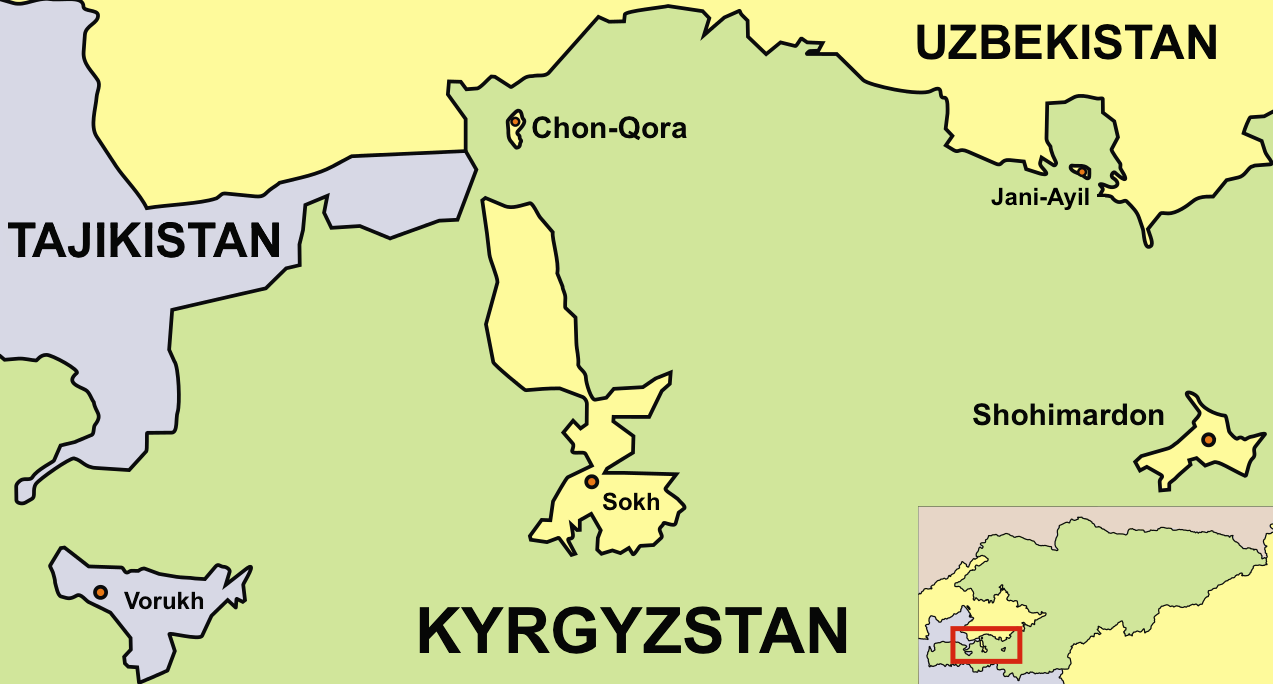
- Map showing the five exclaves in Kyrgyzstan. Vorukh is in blue on the bottom left,

- Location in Tajikistan
- Coordinates: 39°51′12″N 70°34′37″E
- Country: Tajikistan
- Region: Sughd Region
- City: Isfara

Area
  - Total: 96.7 km^{2} (37.3 sq mi)

Population (2022)
  - Total: 45,000
- Time zone: UTC+5 (TJT)
- Official languages: Russian (Interethnic); Tajik (State)

Vorukh (Russian and Tajik: Ворух; Sogdian: Wārōx) is a jamoat in northern Tajikistan that forms part of the city of Isfara in Sughd Region. As of 2022, the jamoat had a total population of 45.000. It is an exclave surrounded by the Batken Region of Kyrgyzstan.

== History and territorial conflicts ==
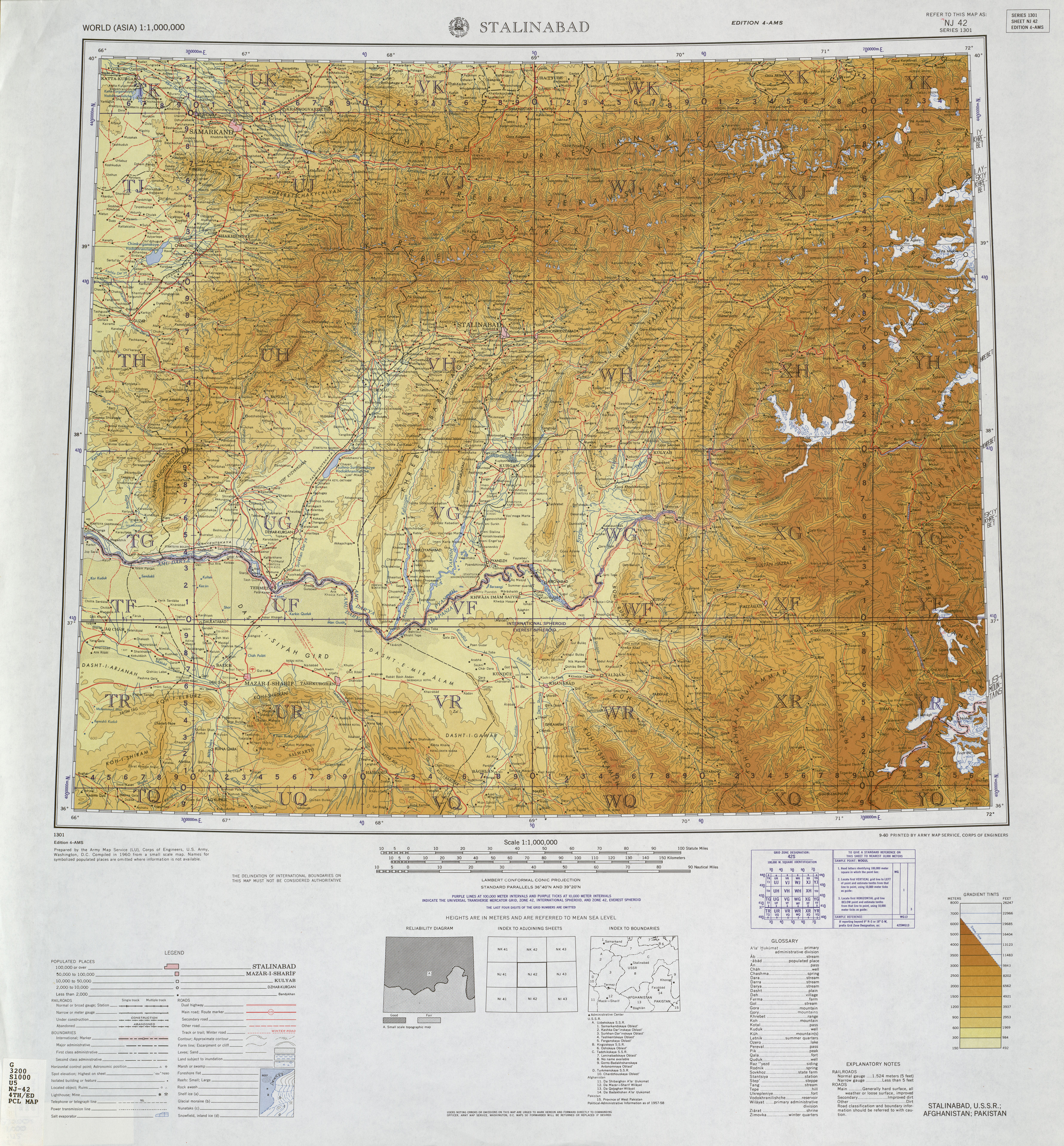
Map headed 'Stalinabad' (Dushanbe) including Vorukh (square XK, top right).

Vorukh is the name of a village and one of two exclaves of Tajikistan within the Batken Province of Kyrgyzstan. There are three Tajik enclaves (including the Sarvan exclave surrounded by Uzbekistan), which were products of several border adjustments during the Stalin administration.

Due to the inherent territorial restrictions of the exclave, violent conflicts over land ownership, access to pasture, and shared water resources have become more common, as logistical complications within this densely populated and impoverished region have also given rise to economic concern.

The location of the border of the enclave is disputed by the Tajik and Kyrgyz governments, and has led to hundreds of clashes in the areas between communities and border forces over the years. In April 2013 an argument between Vorukh residents and Kyrgyz labourers escalated into a fight, ultimately involving several hundred people, when Vorukh residents objected to the building of a new road that would bypass the enclave. In May 2013 Kyrgyzstan and Tajik officials met to address the ongoing tensions. In April and May 2021 the region once again brought tensions between the two countries, and at least 31 people were killed in the fighting. Brief clashes also occurred there in January 2022.

== Climate ==
Köppen-Geiger climate classification system classifies its climate as dry-summer continental (Dsa).

Climate data for Vorukh
Month	Jan	Feb	Mar	Apr	May	Jun	Jul	Aug	Sep	Oct	Nov	Dec	Year
Mean daily maximum °C (°F)	0.0 (32.0)	2.1 (35.8)	8.6 (47.5)	17.0 (62.6)	22.4 (72.3)	27.9 (82.2)	30.7 (87.3)	29.7 (85.5)	24.8 (76.6)	17.0 (62.6)	8.5 (47.3)	2.3 (36.1)	15.9 (60.7)
Daily mean °C (°F)	−4.2 (24.4)	−2.1 (28.2)	4.1 (39.4)	11.4 (52.5)	16.0 (60.8)	20.6 (69.1)	23.0 (73.4)	21.8 (71.2)	16.7 (62.1)	10.3 (50.5)	3.6 (38.5)	−1.5 (29.3)	10.0 (49.9)
Mean daily minimum °C (°F)	−8.3 (17.1)	−6.3 (20.7)	−0.3 (31.5)	5.9 (42.6)	9.7 (49.5)	13.3 (55.9)	15.4 (59.7)	13.9 (57.0)	8.7 (47.7)	3.7 (38.7)	−1.3 (29.7)	−5.2 (22.6)	4.1 (39.4)
Average precipitation mm (inches)	53 (2.1)	51 (2.0)	79 (3.1)	71 (2.8)	69 (2.7)	21 (0.8)	11 (0.4)	4 (0.2)	6 (0.2)	40 (1.6)	39 (1.5)	51 (2.0)	495 (19.4)
Source: Climate-Data.org (altitude: 1379m)

== See also ==
- List of enclaves and exclaves
- Kayragach, the other Tajikistan exclave in Kyrgyzstan
- Sarvan, a Tajikistan exclave in Uzbekistan
- Shohimardon, an Uzbekistan exclave in Kyrgyzstan
- Sokh, an Uzbekistan exclave in Kyrgyzstan
