= Capital punishment in Tajikistan =

Capital punishment is permitted in Tajikistan by Article 18 of the 1999 Constitution of Tajikistan, which provides:

Every person has the right to life. No person may be deprived of life except by the verdict of a court for a very serious crime.

The last known execution took place in 2004. That same year, President Emomali Rahmon announced a moratorium on capital punishment.

Tajikistan is not signatory to the Second Optional Protocol to the International Covenant on Civil and Political Rights, which aims to abolish the death penalty.

Public foundation "Notabene" conducted a survey in 2010 on public opinion on the death penalty in Tajikistan. More than half of the respondents among the general population — precisely, 61.18% — are against death penalty in Tajikistan. 93% of the polled employees of courts and judges were also in favor of abolishing capital punishment, while 88% of the polled employees of investigative bodies and prosecutor's office supported retaining the death penalty. CABAR further provides the support among the latter group by citing the Prosecutor General Yusuf Rahmon and the Interior Minister Ramazon Rahimov, who both support abolishing the moratorium, with latter emphasizing that "there are crimes that cannot be forgiven".
