= Collaboration with the Islamic State =

Cooperation and assistance given to ISIS

Throughout the Syrian civil war, war in Iraq, and Libyan civil war, various governments, non-state actors, and private individuals engaged in collaboration with the Islamic State.

== Islamic State in Iraq and Syria ==
=== Name of the group ===
The name Islamic State in Iraq and Syria (ISIS) originally referred to the territory they controlled during their first peak in the mid 2010s. Abu Bakr al-Baghdadi shortened their name to Islamic State when he attempted to declare a Caliphate. This was rejected by the Islamic world in their Letter to Baghdadi and elsewhere. Part of this rejection was to continue to refer to the group by the acronym, ISIS or in Arabic Daesh (Arabic: داعش), a name that was never used by the group. The name Daesh was adopted in numerous other languages ranging from modern Hebrew (Hebrew: דאעש, romanized: Daesh, lit. 'ISIS') to New Zealand English, and continues to be used to refer to the group more broadly after the loss of their territory.

=== Islamic State territory in Iraq and Syria ===
At its peak in 2015, the Islamic State governed approximately eight million people within a territory of around 90,000 square kilometres spanning parts of Syria and Iraq. The group sought to establish a state-like structure, mirroring other sovereign nation-states in the Middle East. It did so by creating various governing institutions, including ministries and offices responsible for healthcare, education, the economy, and security. This served not only to consolidate its authority over the region but also to gain acceptance and support from the local population by addressing grievances and improving living conditions that had been neglected by the previous Syrian and Iraqi governments.

Matthew Bamber roughly estimates that approximately 22,000 civilian employees worked for IS at some point, categorising them into muba’yain, those who had pledged allegiance to IS, and munasirin, those who worked for IS without formally pledging their allegiance. He argues that this distinction is important, as the counterterrorism community often treats IS's affiliates as a single homogeneous group, failing to recognise that some individuals employed by IS were unaware of their employer's identity due to the sudden regime takeover. In certain cases, civilian employees faced the threat of lethal retaliation against themselves or their families if they attempted to resign. Furthermore, he questions whether local employees who continued their work after IS's takeover should be punished simply for maintaining their jobs, even if their salaries were paid by the Islamic State.

In her book A Landscape of War, Munira Khayyat takes this argument further, asserting that people living amidst war defy its political and military outcomes by finding ways to live with its realities, which is, according to her, a form of resistance in its own right. From this perspective, one could argue that Syrians and Iraqis who lived and worked under IS's rule without pledging allegiance to the group were not necessarily collaborators but, in fact, engaged in a form of resistance. IS sought to establish an Islamic society governed by Islamic law, Sharia, in which its subjects would not only submit to its authority but actively embrace and uphold its rule.

==== Iraq ====
"Do I regret it? I don't know if I'd use that word. They had become the government and we now worked for them. We wanted to work so we could get paid."

— Suleiman al-Afari, Iraqi scientist who helped IS in producing chemical weapons (sentenced to death at the time of the interview)

Between 2014 and 2019, the Islamic State undertook an extensive state-building project but soon realised that it could not rely solely on its local and foreign members, as they lacked the necessary expertise and competencies to implement such an endeavour. Consequently, IS recruited former Ba’ath Party members and Iraqi military officers, recognising their experience in state-building and the provision of essential services. This decision was made despite IS's hostility towards these former officials of Saddam Hussein’s secular-nationalist government, as their skills were deemed crucial for consolidating IS's political and military authority over its newly acquired territory.

At the same time, these former Ba’athists sought to regain control over the newly established Shia-dominated Iraqi government, which had replaced the Sunni-led administration under Hussein. Even though their ideological vision clashed with that of IS, they were willing to collaborate with the jihadist group as a means of advancing their own political ambitions. This alliance contributed to atrocities such as the Camp Speicher Massacre in Iraq, where 57 members of the Arab Socialist Ba'ath Party – Iraq Region participated in the execution of at least 1,566 Shia cadets from the Iraqi Air Force on June 12, 2014.

Sunni Arabs in Iraq have been accused of collaborating with IS against Assyrians, and Yazidis, and Shias. IS marked Christian homes with the letter nūn for Naṣārā and Shia homes with the letter rāʾ for Rāfiḍa, a derogatory term used to describe Shias by some Sunni Muslims. Properties were confiscated and given to local IS supporters or foreign fighters. Local Sunnis were reported to have betrayed Yazidis once IS arrived, or colluded in advance to lure them into staying put until the IS invaded.

==== Syria ====
In response to the effort to take Raqqa by the Syrian Democratic Forces, whose main component is the Kurdish People's Protection Units (YPG), some Syrian Arabs in Raqqa sided with the Islamic State.

=== Syria ===
Proportion of attacks by IS on other groups in Syria, during the period from March 2016 – April 2017 according to IHS Markit.
1. Syrian army (43.0%)
2. Sunni rebels (40.0%)
3. Syrian Dem. Forces (17.0%)

During the Syrian civil war, the Syrian opposition and some analysts had accused President Bashar al-Assad and the Ba'athist regime of strategically releasing Islamist prisoners during the start of the Syrian crisis in an attempt to strengthen jihadist factions over other rebels. The Syrian opposition have also accused Assad of having intelligence operatives within the ranks of IS, and even directing IS attacks. However, "despite repeated announcements by opposition figures", there exists "no solid evidence ... that the jihadists as a whole are controlled by the [Syrian] regime.

The Assad government has also been accused of funding IS through oil purchases. Western officials stated in 2015 that the Syrian government and IS jointly ran a gas plant in Tabqah using intermediates to supply electricity to both Ba'athist and IS-held areas. A report in 2015 suggested that IS kept gas flowing to Assad regime-controlled power stations. Furthermore, IS allowed grain to pass from Rojava to government-controlled areas at the cost of a 25% levy. IS defectors interviewed by academics in 2015 and 2016 reported being "disillusioned by... upsetting alliances that included the sale of wheat stores and oil to Assad, oil some of which later found its way into barrel bombs raining down on Syrian civilians." This was confirmed in 2016 in Wall Street Journal reporting of documents extracted by US Special Forces in raids on IS operatives. In 2017, US and European officials said that oil sales to the Syrian government were IS's largest source of revenue.

An unpublished IHS Jane's Terrorism and Insurgency Center database analysis showed that only 6% of Syrian government forces attacks were targeted at IS from January to November 2014, while in the same period only 13% of all IS attacks targeted government forces. Academics who interviewed IS defectors in 2015–16 said their interviewees "observed regime forces strangely giving up territory to ISIS without much of a fight, and even leaving their weapons for ISIS rather than destroying them." Aymenn Jawad Al-Tamimi had disputed such assertions in 2014, arguing that "ISIS has a record of fighting the regime on multiple fronts", many rebel factions have engaged in oil sales to the Syrian regime because it is "now largely dependent on Iraqi oil imports via Lebanese and Egyptian third-party intermediaries", and while "the regime is focusing its airstrikes [on areas] where it has some real expectations of advancing" claims that it "has not hit ISIS strongholds" are "untrue". He concluded: "Attempting to prove an ISIS-regime conspiracy without any conclusive evidence is unhelpful, because it draws attention away from the real reasons why ISIS grew and gained such prominence: namely, rebel groups tolerated ISIS." Similarly, Max Abrahms and John Glaser stated in the Los Angeles Times in December 2017 that "The evidence of Assad sponsoring Islamic State... was about as strong as for Saddam Hussein sponsoring Al Qaeda". According to an April 2017 IHS Markit report, IS fought Syrian government forces more than any other opponent between April 1, 2016, and March 31, 2017: "43 percent of all Islamic State fighting in Syria was directed against President Assad's forces, 17 against the U.S.-backed Syrian Democratic Forces (SDF) and the remaining 40 percent involved fighting rival Sunni opposition groups".

== Allegations of support from other places ==
=== Palestine ===
Israeli public officials often accused the Hamas-led Palestinian government in Gaza of collaborating with or resembling IS. "Hamas is ISIS" was first asserted by Israeli prime minister Benjamin Netanyahu near the end of the 2014 Gaza War; he followed this by saying “Hamas is ISIS and ISIS is Hamas” in a 2014 speech at the United Nations. In reference to this, the head of the Department of Political Science at Hebron University, said it was "dangerous" to conflate Hamas and IS. Israeli journalists at Haaretz and +972 Magazine asserted that Hamas resembles the Irgun and Lehi more closely than it resembles IS.

Occasionally, Egyptian public officials have accused Hamas of assisting IS in the Sinai, but in public the two groups had a violently hostile relationship. Israeli Major General Yoav “Polly” Mordechai also accused people in Gaza of helping IS by providing medical care to people wounded in the Sinai conflict. However, medical ethics and international law supports providing treatment for all wounded, including irregular combatants.

In the days following the October 7 attacks in 2023 and start of the Gaza war, The Jerusalem Post quoted Benjamin Netanyahu saying, “They are savages. Hamas is ISIS”; the article then highlighted some alleged similarities in the groups' influences identified by Dr. Harel Chorev (from the Moshe Dayan Center for Middle Eastern Studies at Tel Aviv University). Netanyahu included this assertion in a public addresses in the United States made alongside Secretary Antony J. Blinken, in the first week of the Israeli bombing of the Gaza Strip. Netanyahu said, "Hamas is ISIS, and just as ISIS was crushed, so too will Hamas be crushed".

International military experts and mainstream international media pointed out major differences, particularly relating to nationalism, Shia Islam, Christianity, democracy, and destruction of cultural heritage. IS want a purely theocratic system of government without any element of democracy, and IS violently attack Christians, whereas Hamas participated in the 2006 Palestinian legislative election and the Hamas-led electoral list that won the election included a Palestinian Christian running for the Christian reserved seat in Gaza City. Talal Abu Zarifa, a leader from the DFLP (a secular faction allied to Hamas), said Israel was using the comparison to "justify its annihilation of Palestinian people and bloodshed".

A few commentators pointed out some commonalities, such as that both are on the list of designated terrorist groups in the United States, and United Kingdom, but still stressed the groups' very different ideological goals. Only a few sources agreed that Hamas and IS are comparable.

=== Turkey ===
The Turkish government has been criticised for allowing IS to use Turkish territory for logistics and channelling recruits. It has also been accused of selling arms and intelligence to IS, as part of its campaign against the People's Protection Units (YPG). That IS leader Abu Bakr al-Baghdadi's Syrian hideout was found just a few kilometers away from Turkey also raised suspicions whether Turkey was doing enough against IS. Iraqi intelligence officers also claimed that they have observed several journeys by relatives of Al Baghdadi between Syria and Turkey. Turkey denies the allegations of assisting IS, pointing to multiple terrorist attacks IS has committed against civilians in Turkey, as well as multiple military confrontations between IS and the Turkish government. The Kurdistan Democratic Party in Iraq similarly deny the claim that Turkey is providing aid to IS. According to an intelligence adviser quoted by Seymour Hersh, a "highly classified assessment" carried out by the Defense Intelligence Agency (DIA) and the Joint Chiefs of Staff in 2013 concluded that Turkey had effectively transformed the secret U.S. arms program in support of moderate rebels, who no longer existed, into an indiscriminate program to provide technical and logistical support for al-Nusra Front and ISIL.

=== United States ===
Rand Paul, a junior U.S. Senator from Kentucky, has accused the U.S. government of indirectly supporting IS in the Syrian Civil War, by arming their allies and fighting their enemies in that country. Online, a photograph taken in Syria in 2013 was miscaptioned in order to claim that Senator John McCain posed with ISIS leader Abu Bakr al-Baghdadi. The photograph, however, actually depicted the commander of another Syrian rebel group allied with the Free Syrian Army, not al-Baghdadi. After the September 2016 Deir ez-Zor air raid in which U.S led coalition air strikes reportedly killed at least 62 Syrian Arab army soldiers fighting against IS, Russia and Syria accused the U.S government of intentionally providing IS with air support. The U.S government denied the accusations and called the air strikes an accident caused by misidentification of SAA ground forces as IS fighters. Donald Trump has claimed that Barack Obama and Hillary Clinton "[were] the founder[s] of ISIS", although he later clarified that he was being "sarcastic". The White House did not comment on Trump's accusation. Former president of Afghanistan Hamid Karzai also claimed IS is a tool of the United States. He also asserted he can't differentiate the US and IS. On June 13, 2024, Robert F. Kennedy Jr., the 2024 independent presidential candidate of the US presidential election, said during his foreign policy program speech: "We created ISIS".

=== Saudi Arabia ===
In June 2014, former Iraqi Prime Minister Nouri al-Maliki accused the government of Saudi Arabia of funding ISIL. The Saudi Arabian government rejected the claims.

Some media outlets, such as NBC, the BBC, The New York Times, and the US-based think tank Washington Institute for Near East Policy have written about individual Saudi donations to the group and the Saudi state's decade-long sponsorship of Salafism and Wahhabism around the world, but concluded in 2014 that there was no evidence of direct Saudi state support for ISIL.

In an August 2014 email leaked in the Podesta emails, apparently from former US Secretary of the United States Hillary Clinton to then counselor John Podesta, a memo states that the governments of both Saudi Arabia and Qatar "are providing clandestine financial and logistic support to ISIL and other radical Sunni groups in the region."

Lebanese former minister Charbel Wehbe also accused Saudi Arabia of supporting ISIL.

=== Qatar ===
Qatar has long been accused of acting as a conduit for the flow of funds to ISIL. While there is no proof that the Qatari government is involved in this movement of funds, it has been criticised for not doing enough to stem money sent by private donors in the country. According to some reports, US officials believe that the largest portion of private donations supporting ISIL and al Qaeda-linked groups now comes from Qatar rather than Saudi Arabia.

In August 2014, German minister Gerd Müller accused Qatar of having links to IS, stating: "You have to ask who is arming, who is financing ISIS troops. The keyword there is Qatar." Qatari Foreign Minister Khalid bin Mohammad Al Attiyah rejected this statement, saying: "Qatar does not support extremist groups, including [IS], in any way. We are repelled by their views, their violent methods and their ambitions."

=== Israel ===
The Iranian government has accused Israel of supporting ISIS with arms and medical attention. In 2014, the Islamic Republic News Agency reported that IS was the product of a joint American–British–Israeli intelligence operation to destabilize the Middle East and protect Israel. In 2017, the Syrian Army claimed it found Israeli-made artillery pieces at IS hideouts. Israel has strongly denied accusations of providing arms and medical support to IS.

In June 2025, Israeli Prime Minister Benjamin Netanyahu said that Israel was arming the Popular Forces, a Rafah-based group led by Yasser Abu Shabab, during the Gaza war. The Popular Forces have been linked to IS; some of its prominent figures have been identified as former IS militants who fought in the Sinai insurgency. Abu Shabab has denied any collaboration with Israel or connections to IS. The researcher and analyst Aymenn Jawad Al-Tamimi disputed claims that the Popular Forces are affiliated with IS; he argued that their use of the Palestinian flag in their logo and uniforms would be unacceptable to IS even as a disguise, and that collaboration with Israel constitutes apostasy from Islam from IS's perspective.

=== Pakistan ===
Former President of Afghanistan, Hamid Karzai accused Pakistan for supporting IS during interview with ANI that Afghanistan has evidence of Pakistan's support to IS. He added that there is no doubt to the above statement.

Pakistan has strenuously denied accusations of providing arms and medical support to Islamic State fighters, despite medical ethics and international law supporting the provision of medical care for all wounded, including irregular combatants.

=== Iran ===
The fall of the Assad regime in December 2024 severely disrupted Iran's strategy of spreading its influence throughout the Middle East, and European and Middle Eastern officials warned that Iran was beginning to collaborate with Sunni extremist groups to maintain weapons-smuggling lines to Hezbollah. European officials told The Washington Post that this included IS-affiliated militants.

=== Medical care ===
Some states and foreign nationals have been accused of providing medical support (details organised by state). Medical ethics and international law supports providing treatment for all wounded, including irregular combatants. Serious concerns have been raised about the implications of penalizing medical workers or organizations for providing medical care to people who have been categorized as terrorists, "...counterterrorism policies reject the fundamental premises on which the IHL protections for the wounded and sick are based".

== Foreign nationals ==
A United Nations report from May 2015 showed that 25,000 "foreign terrorist fighters" from 100 countries had joined "Islamist" groups, many of them working for IS or al-Qaeda. The US-trained commander of Tajikistan's Interior Ministry OMON police special forces, Gulmurod Khalimov, has been raised to the rank of "Minister of War" within the Islamic State.

One of the most prominent commanders of IS in Syria, Abu Omar al-Shishani, served previously as a sergeant in the Georgian Army before being medically discharged, later imprisoned, becoming radicalized, then fleeing the country.

A 2015 report by the Program on Extremism at George Washington University found 71 individuals charged in the United States with supporting IS, 250 travelling or attempting to travel to Syria or Iraq from the United States to join IS, and about 900 active domestic IS-related investigations.

An October 2016 World Bank study found that "ISIL's foreign fighters are surprisingly well-educated." Using the fighters' self-reported educational levels, the study concluded that "69% of recruits reported at least a secondary-level education" of which "a large fraction have gone on to study at university" and also that "only 15% of recruits left school before high school; less than 2% are illiterate." The study also found that foreign fighters are often more educated than their countrymen where those "from Europe and in Central Asia have similar levels of education to their countrymen" while those "from the Middle East, North Africa, and South and East Asia are significantly more educated than what is typical in their home nations." The report notes that its conclusions that terrorism is not driven by poverty and low levels of education which conforms with previous research. However, the report did find a strong correlation "between a country's male unemployment rate and the propensity of the country to supply foreign fighters". Many European countries have allowed their citizens that joined IS to be prosecuted by Iraq.

=== Australia ===
In August 2018, Australia stripped the Australian citizenship from five terrorists who had travelled to fight with the Islamic State and barred them from entering Australia again. This was only possible because they had double citizenships because international law stops the measure from being used on individuals with only one citizenship. The five brought the total to six.

=== Belgium ===
Up to 2018, an estimated 450 individuals had travelled from Belgium to join the civil war in Syria and Iraq. Of those, 75 were linked to the Sharia4Belgium network. In July 2018, courts announced that Belgium had no obligation to bring children of Islamic State members to Belgium.

=== Denmark ===
In November 2017, Denmark stripped a Turkish man of his Danish citizenship after having been sentenced for terror offenses related to the Islamic State, which left him with a citizenship of Turkey.

=== France ===
Up to 2018, an estimated 1700 individuals had travelled from France to join the civil war in Syria and Iraq.

French nationals who were involved in the Yazidi genocide were prosecuted in France.

=== Germany ===
Up to 2018, an estimated 940 individuals had travelled from Germany to join the civil war in Syria and Iraq.

=== India ===
Up to 2019, about a 100 Indian nationals had joined the IS in Syria and Afghanistan while 155 individuals had been arrested for IS-related connections. Many of these came from the southern Indian state of Kerala and also from Tamil Nadu, Karnataka and Maharashtra. These numbers are considered relatively low despite India having the third-largest population of Muslims [as of 2020]. The limited involvement of Indian Muslim fighters in calls for global jihad was also observed during the Soviet–Afghan War, and various reasons have been given for this. These include the limited influence of Salafi-Wahabbism in India, inability of IS sympathizers in India to travel to IS controlled territories due to logistical factors and poverty among Indian Muslims, the existing presence of Pakistani militant groups such as Lashkar-e-Taiba and Jaish-e-Muhammad with which the IS is in open strife, and the opposition of Indian Islamic leadership to such groups (with 70,000 Barelvi clerics issuing a fatwa condemning IS and similar organisations in 2015).

=== Netherlands ===
The Parliament of Netherlands voted in 2016 for legislation to strip Dutch citizens who join IS or al Qaeda abroad of their citizenship, also if they have not been convicted of any crime. The law can only be applied to individuals with double citizenship. Justice Minister Ard van der Steur stated the legal changes were necessary to stop jihadists from returning to the Netherlands. In September 2017, four jihadists were stripped of their citizenship.

In the 2012 to November 2018 period, more than 310 individuals had travelled from the Netherlands to the conflict in Syria and Iraq. Of those 85 had been killed and 55 returned to the Netherlands. Of the surviving Dutch foreign fighters in the region, 135 are fighters in the conflict zone and three-quarters are members of IS. The remaining quarter have joined Al-Qaeda affiliated groups such as Hay'at Tahrir al-Sham or Tanzim Hurras al-Deen.

=== Palestine ===
Men from the Gaza Strip who joined IS during the Sinai insurgency were shunned by the community and disowned by their families.

=== Sweden ===
Up to 2018, an estimated 300 individuals had travelled from Sweden to join the civil war in Syria. In March 2018 Kurdish authorities reported they had captured 41 IS supporters with either Swedish citizenship or residence permit in Sweden, of which 5 had key positions in the organisation and one was the head of the IS propaganda efforts.

=== Turkey ===
Officials of the Democratic Autonomous Administration of North and East Syria (DAANES) told al-Monitor that some 66 Turkish nationals were among the 4,583 IS prisoners transferred by the United States Army from the Al-Hasakah Governorate of Syria to Iraq following the January 2026 offensive by the Syrian transitional government of Ahmed al-Sharaa against the Syrian Democratic Forces during the first twenty days of the operation (until 11 February 2026). According to the United Nations, 1,003 Turkish wives, widows and children of IS fighters were being held at the al-Hawl refugee camp (now under Syrian government control), and 50 Turkish families of IS members were reported as inmates of the Roj camp in the DAANES, with Turkey allegedly reluctant to repatriate them.

=== United Kingdom ===
Cabinet minister William Hague stated in 2014 that up to 400 British citizens had joined ISIL. The government instituted a practice where if those who had joined had double citizenships were stripped of their British citizenship to prevent them from arriving back in the UK. By 2017, 150 individuals had been stripped of citizenship and were thus unable to enter the United Kingdom again. Some relevant cells from UK were The Beatles cell known for having carried out beheadings of journalists and aid workers in Iraq and Syria. The "Britani Brigade Bangladeshi Bad Boys" were a group of five British Bangladeshis from Portsmouth, who moved to Syria in September 2013. The CCTV of the Gatwick airport watched the five men walking towards their flight. The cell was led by Ifthekar Jaman, (a.k.a. Abu Abdurrahman al-Britani) who was killed in December 2013 in an encounter against loyalist forces to the Syrian government. With the pass of the war the other members were dying in combat, and it was not until July 26, 2015, the last member of the cell (Azzam Uzzaman) were killed in action confirmed by the International Centre for the Study of Radicalisation and Political Violence,

=== Uruguay ===
On February 17, 2025, a video became visible in which IS claims they have come to Uruguay to carry out attacks in the Americas. The author of the video was identified as S. B. de P., he pledged allegiance to Abu Hafs al-Hashimi al-Qurashi and was arrested in October 2024.

== Groups expressing support for IS ==
The Terrorism Research and Analysis Consortium (TRAC) has identified 60 jihadist groups in 30 countries that have pledged allegiance to or support for IS as of mid-November 2014. That many of these groups were previously affiliated with al-Qaeda suggests a shift in global jihadist leadership towards IS.

Members of the following groups have allegedly declared support for IS, either fully or in part:

- Boko Haram (until 2016)
- Ansar al-Sharia (Tunisia)
- Jund al-Khilafah
- Mujahideen Shura Council in the Environs of Jerusalem
- Jamaah Ansharut Tauhid – (pledged support to IS; the majority of the group split off after its leader pledged allegiance to IS)
- Islamic Movement of Uzbekistan
- Jundallah (Pakistan)
- Caucasus Emirate (most of Caucasus Emirate commanders switched allegiance to IS)
- Sheikh Omar Hadid Brigade
- Khalifa Islamiyah Mindanao
  - Jemaah Islamiyah
  - Abu Sayyaf
  - Bangsamoro Islamic Freedom Fighters
  - Ansar Khalifa Philippines
- Islamic Defenders Front (FPI): Pledged allegiance and support to IS in 2014. Only revealed in 2020 by the government upon its ban.)
- Saraya al-Madina al-Munawara

(Not all of the Groups supporting IS are mentioned)

In 2015, the Italian Marxist–Leninist Party declared its support for IS against the "imperialist holy alliance".

== See also ==
- Collaborationism
- Ruslan Maratovich Asainov
- Foreign involvement in the Syrian civil war
- List of designated terrorist groups
- State sponsors of terrorism
- War on terror
