= Mirzo Ahmadovich Ziyoev =

4th Minister of Emergency Situations and Civil Defense of the Republic of Tajikistan
- In office 1999–2006
- President: Emomali Rahmon
- Preceded by: M. Iskandarov
- Succeeded by: M.Z. Zokirov

Personal details
- Born: 15 September 1960 Khojai Khiloz, Panj District, Kurgan-Tyube Region, Tajik SSR, USSR
- Died: 11 July 2009 (aged 48) Tavildara District, Tajikistan
- Education: Dushanbe Industrial College

Military service
- Allegiance: UTO
- Rank: Commander
- Commands: forces of the UTO
- Battles/wars: Tajikistani Civil War

Mirzo Ahmadovich Ziyoev (15 September 1960, Khojai Khiloz, Panj District, Kurgan-Tyube Region, Tajik SSR, USSR — 11 July 2009, Tavildara District, Tajikistan) was a Tajik statesman. He served as the commander of the forces of the United Tajik Opposition (1992–1997). He was the Minister of Emergency Situations and Civil Defense of the Republic of Tajikistan (1999–2006). Lieutenant General. He was killed during a special operation by government forces in the Tavildara District.

== Biography ==
Mirzo Ziyoev was born on 15 September 1960 in the village of Khojai Khiloz in Panj District, Kurgan-Tyube Region, Tajik SSR. After completing secondary school, he served in the Soviet Army in Kaliningrad from 1978 to 1980. He studied at the Dushanbe Industrial College, where he qualified as a surveyor-technician. After college, Mirzo Ziyoev worked as a surveyor in Panj District until 1992.

With the onset of the political crisis in Tajikistan in 1992, Ziyoev formed his own unit and fled to Afghanistan. He was the commander of the forces of the United Tajik Opposition during the Tajikistani Civil War. His unit controlled the Tavildara District, where Sharia law was established. In November 1998, Mirzo Ziyoev assisted government forces in suppressing the rebellion of Colonel Mahmud Khudoiberdiev.

According to the "Agreement on the Establishment of Peace and National Accord in Tajikistan," the opposition received 30% of the seats in the new government of the republic, and in 1999, Mirzo Ziyoev became the head of the Ministry of Emergency Situations. In December 2005, Ziyoev was promoted to the rank of Lieutenant General. However, on 30 November 2006, he was dismissed from his post as minister. After his dismissal, Ziyoev settled in Tavildara District.

On 11 July 2009, it was reported that Mirzo Ziyoev was killed during a special operation by Tajikistan's security forces. According to official information, Ziyoev was part of a criminal group planning to seize administrative buildings in the Tavildara District. To prevent this, a special operation was launched to eliminate the militants. Ziyoev agreed to cooperate with the authorities, but after surrendering to the security forces, he was killed during a clash by his supporters.

Mirzo Ziyoev was buried the next day – 12 July in Tavildara.
