= Academy of the Ministry of Internal Affairs of Tajikistan =

Military academy in Tajikistan

Coordinates: 38.55168°N 68.82327°E

- Академияи Вазорати корҳои дохилии Ҷумҳурии Тоҷикистон
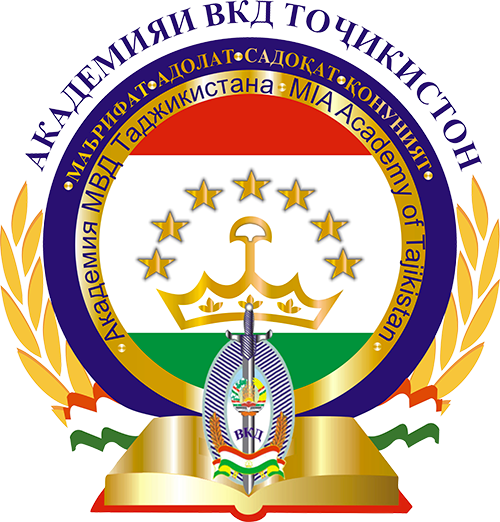
- Other name: VKD Academy
- Former name: MVD Higher School of Mechanical Engineering
- Type: military academy
- Established: 2000
- Parent institution: Ministry of Internal Affairs
- Commandant: Major General Faizali Sharifzoda
- Academic staff: 28
- Students: 2,200 (including 156 women)
- Doctoral students: 3
- Location: 123 Vose Street, Dushanbe, Tajikistan
- Language: Tajik, Russian
- Colors
- Website: http://www.avkd.tj/ru/

The Academy of the Ministry of Internal Affairs of Tajikistan (Tajik: Академияи Вазорати корҳои дохилии Ҷумҳурии Тоҷикистон) is a higher military institution in the Ministry of Internal Affairs of Tajikistan which serves to train future soldiers and officers of the Internal Troops and the Police of Tajikistan. The academic year runs from September to July, with the tuition at the school is US$400–800 per student depending on their department.

It was founded in 2000 as a result of the renovation of the MVD Higher School of Mechanical Engineering, which was founded in 1991 on the basis of a department of higher education of the USSR based in Tashkent in the USSR. At the time of its founding, it was one of the first MVD academies in Tajikistan and Central Asia.

== History ==
=== Origins ===
Since the mid-1920s, with the establishment of police departments in Tajikistan, training courses for police officers were organized. In 1930, in the city of Stalinabad, a two-year police school began to function.

=== Modern academy ===
The Cabinet of Ministers adopted the Resolution "On the establishment of the Dushanbe Higher School of the Ministry of Internal Affairs of the Republic of Tajikistan" on December 23, 1991, following independence. The modern academy was founded on 30 December 2000. From 2014 to 2017, new administrative and educational buildings were commissioned in the academy, which was opened on the country's 26th anniversary in 2017.

== Heads ==
The heads of both of the Dushanbe Secondary Special Police School and then the academy were:

- Colonel Gani Nematov (1970-1975)
- Major General Viktor Fomichev (1975-1979)
- Colonel Nu'mon Yakhoev (1979-1982)
- Lieutenant Colonel Abdukholik Abdunazarov (1982-1985)
- Colonel Viktor Omelchenko (1985-1991)
- Colonel Usmon Dzhumaev (1991-1993)
- Colonel General Abdurahim Kakhkharov (1993-2000)
- Major General Shamsullo Saimuddinov (2000-2005)
- Major General Fayz Dustov (2005-2009)
- Major General Sherali Rozikzoda (2009-2013)
- Major General Jurakhon Majidzoda (2013-2014)
- Major General Faizali Sharifzoda (2014–present)

== Academics ==
=== Areas of study ===
The academy's mission is to prepare cadets for service in the armed forces, the internal troops, or for higher educational institutions such as Tajik National University. Cadets are trained in the academy in the following areas:

- Legal Management
- Operations
- Judicial System
- Criminal System
- Mechanics
- Engineering
- Emergency Situations
- Commands

=== Faculties ===
The faculty of the academy includes officials from the VKD as well as officials from other law enforcement and defense agencies, including the Ministry of Defence, the Ministry of Justice, the National Guard, and the Committee on Emergency Situations and Civil Defense.

The academy is also divided into faculties, which are departments that cover specific subjects, such as the following faculties:

- Faculty No. 1 - Conducts lessons on different specialties in city police departments.
- Faculty No. 2 - It prepares cadets for higher education opportunities in the armed forces, as well as in regular Tajik universities.
- Faculty No. 3 - Cadets are solely being trained for service in the internal troops, the VKD, as well as other law enforcement agencies for at least 2 years.
- Faculty No. 4 - Fire safety and Emergencies are the primary focus in this department, where cadets spent 5 years studying in.

== Public image ==
On the occasion of the 25th anniversary of the National Guard of Tajikistan, 300 female cadets took part in the military parade at the National Guard's parade ground.

=== Scientific journal ===
In the scientific journal "Work of the Academy", the academy publishes articles containing the results of scientific research conducted by cadets. The magazine published the results of research works . The journal is published in the Russian, Tajik and English languages four times per year.

== Notable alumni ==
- Ramazon Rahimov, Interior Minister
