= Law enforcement in Tajikistan =

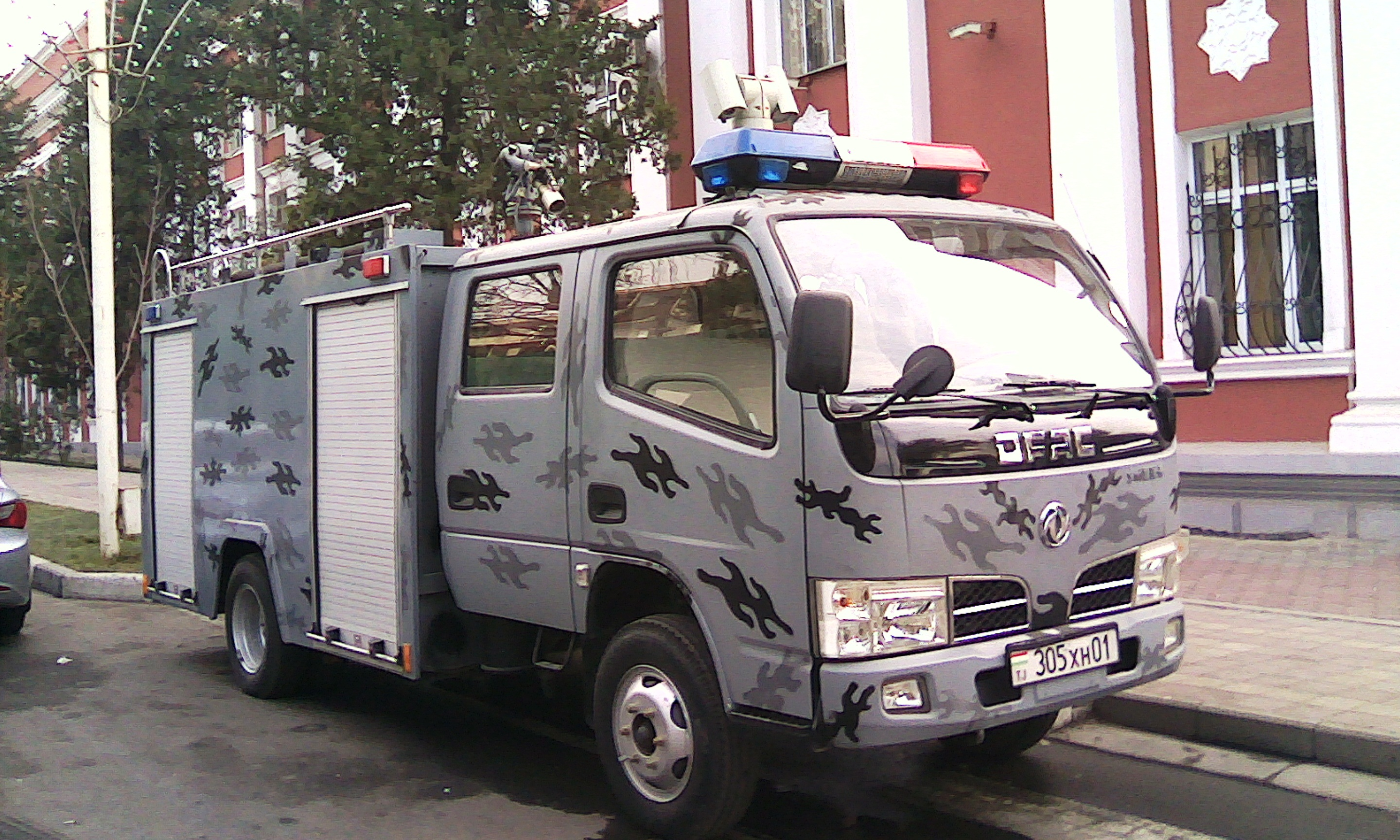
A police transport of the Tajik Internal Troops.

Law enforcement in Tajikistan is primarily the responsibility of the Ministry of Internal Affairs, which controls the police force, which is referred to as the militia occasionally. It is divided into multiple departments, each led by an officer, including the Tajik Internal Troops, as well as the National Guard, which takes orders directly from the President of Tajikistan. The Minister of Internal Affairs oversees it all.

== Police ==
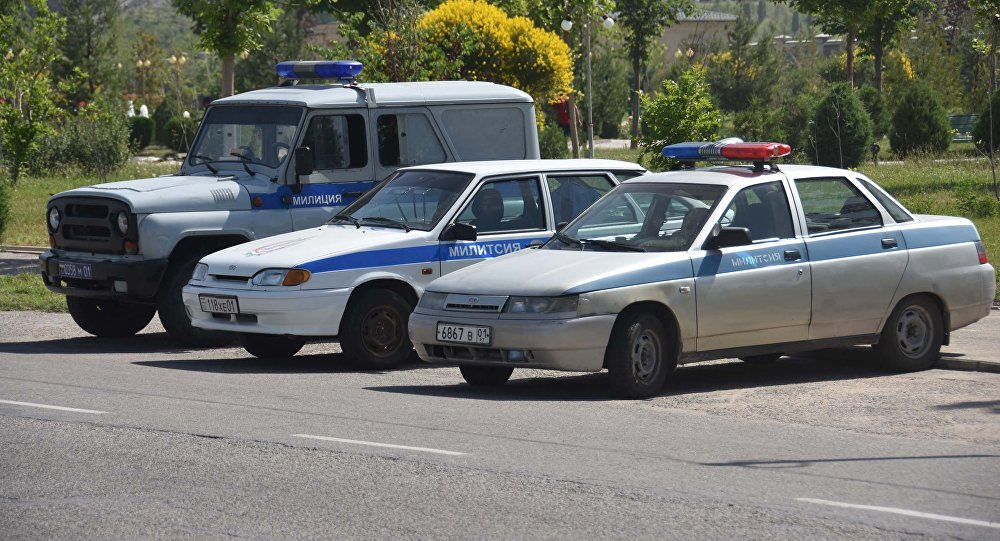
Tajik police cars in 2017.

The Police of Tajikistan (Tajik: Милитсияи Тоҷикистон / Милитсия) are the national police forces of Tajikistan. Founded in November 1992, the police consists of various operational divisions and departments. Every year on 10 November, Tajikistan celebrates Police Day. As of January 2018, Tajikistan is one of four countries (along with Belarus, Uzbekistan and Kyrgyzstan) where the term Militsiya is still formally retained as the service's official name. The term is sometimes still translated as "police". The service uniform and equipment of police officers in Tajikistan are similar to the service uniform and equipment of the Soviet police. In the summer of 2021, an Iranian police office was opened in Tajikistan.

== National Guard ==
The National Guard is part of the Tajikistani Armed Forces and is subordinate to the Supreme Commander-in-Chief, the President of Tajikistan. It is a paramilitary gendarmerie force.

== State Committee for National Security ==
The State Committee for National Security (Tajikistan) is the principal national security and intelligence agency of Tajikistan. Its main responsibilities include internal and border security, counter-intelligence, counter-terrorism, counter-narcotics, fighting organized crime, and surveillance. It is the Tajik successor organization to the Committee for State Security (KGB) of the Soviet Union and its regional affiliate in the Tajik SSR.

== Drug Control Agency ==
The Drug Control Agency is responsible for combating drug trafficking, which has been a major problem due to high heroin production in Afghanistan, to the south.
