= Security Council of Tajikistan =

- Шӯрои Амният Тоҷикистон
- State Emblem of the Tajikistan

Agency overview
- Formed: March 20, 2003
- Preceding agency: Security Council of the Soviet Union
- Jurisdiction: Government of Tajikistan
- Headquarters: Dushanbe, Tajikistan
- Agency executive: Yusuf Rahmon
- Parent department: Executive Office of the President of Tajikistan

The Security Council of Tajikistan (Tajik: Шӯрои Амнияти Тоҷикистон) is a Tajik government consultative group under the country's President's Executive Office. which advises the president on national security issues and matters. It was formed in 2003 with the head of being the President of the Republic of Tajikistan. It was formerly and independent organization until June 2018, when it was subordinated to the president. The Secretary of the Security Council since 2025 has been Yusuf Rahmon. It is essentially a constituent body of the military and security leadership to work out solutions for the implementation of domestic and foreign policy in the national security field.

== Members ==
Permanent members of the Security Council include the following:

- President of the Republic and Supreme Commander-in-Chief of the Armed Forces (chairman)
- Prime Minister
- Chief of Staff of the Executive Office of the President of Tajikistan
- Secretary of the Security Council
- Chairman of the National Assembly and the Assembly of Representatives
- Minister of Foreign Affairs
- Minister of Defence
- Minister of Internal Affairs
- Chief of the General Staff

Representatives of the Gorno-Badakhshan Autonomous Region are occasionally present at Security Council meetings when security issues are being discussed in the council.

== List of secretaries ==
- Muminzhan Mamadjanov (1992 – 1994)
- Amirkul Azimov (August 1996 – May 2011)
- Abdurakhim Kakhkharov (January 5, 2012 -March 4, 2019)
- Mahmadali Vatanzoda (March 4, 2019 – March 6, 2020)
- Nasrullo Mahmudzoda (March 6, 2020 - January 21, 2025)
- Yusuf Rahmon (since February 4, 2025)

== See also ==
- Government of Tajikistan
- Security Council of Belarus
- National Security and Defense Council of Ukraine
- Security Council of Russia
- Security Council of Kazakhstan
