= 2010 Tajik National Guard Mi-8 crash =

Fatal helicopter crash near Ezgand and Tavildara, Tajikistan

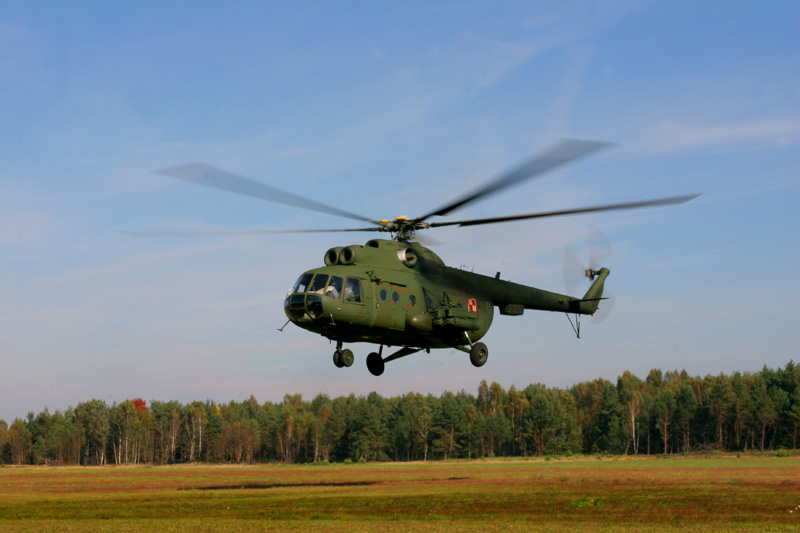
- A Mil Mi-8 similar to the one involved

Accident
- Date: 6 October 2010
- Summary: Controlled flight into terrain
- Site: Rasht Valley, Gorno-Badakhshan Autonomous Province, Tajikistan; 38°43′33″N 70°25′08″E

Aircraft
- Aircraft type: Mil Mi-8
- Operator: Tajik National Guard
- Occupants: 28
- Fatalities: 28
- Survivors: 0

On 6 October 2010. a Mil Mi-8 military helicopter from the Tajik National Guard crashed in the Rasht Valley close to Ezgand and Tavildara, Tajikistan, killing all 28 people on board. The helicopter became caught in power lines and crashed while attempting to land. It was the deadliest accident in Tajik aviation since 1997.

== Initial reports ==
Some initial reports said that seven people were killed and not 28. Later reports proved this false.
