= Sultonov =

Sultonov is a surname. Notable people with the surname include:

- Bahodirjon Sultonov (born 1985), Uzbek boxer
- Elbek Sultonov (born 1995), Uzbek Paralympic athlete
- Mukhammad Sultonov (born 1992), Tajik footballer
- Rafikjon Sultonov (born 1988), Uzbek boxer
- Shukhrat Sultonov (born 1951), Tajik politician
- Utkir Tukhtamurodovich Sultonov (1940–2015), Prime Minister of Uzbekistan

== See also ==
- Sultanov
