= Tajikistani Internal Troops =

Internal security force of Tajikistan

Tajikistani Internal Troops Қӯшунҳои дохилии Тоҷикистон
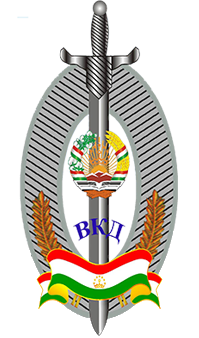

Agency overview
- Formed: 10 April 1993; 33 years ago

Jurisdictional structure
- Operations jurisdiction: Tajikistan
- General nature: Gendarmerie; Civilian police

Operational structure
- Headquarters: Dushanbe
- Parent agency: Ministry of Internal Affairs (VKD)

Notables
- People: Major General Negmatullo Kurbanov; Khisrav Bobozoda
- Significant Battle: Tajikistani Civil War
- Anniversaries: November 10 (Day of the Tajik Police); April 10

Website
- www.vkd.tj

The Tajikistani Internal Troops (Tajik: Қӯшунҳои дохилии Тоҷикистон) are the internal security force of Tajikistan, under the Interior Ministry (VKD). They act as the primary reserve force of the Tajikistani Armed Forces, and are in charge of homeland defence, along with the Tajikistani Border Troops. The Internal Troops are led by Major General Negmatullo Kurbanov.

== Background ==
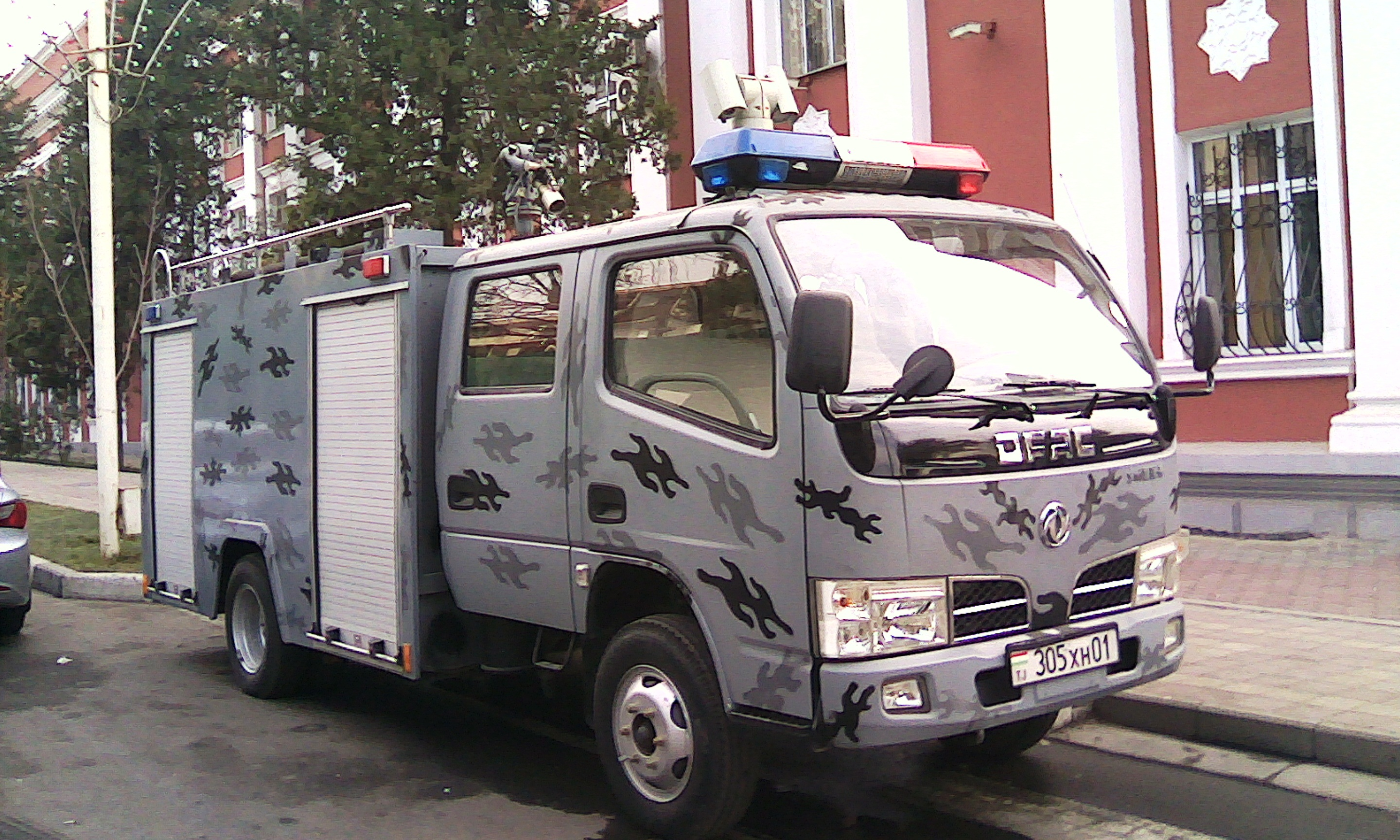
A transport vehicle of the Internal Troops

The first Tajik militia was founded on 7 December 1924, when the People's Commissariat of Internal Affairs of the Tajik Autonomous Republic was formed. A week later on 14 December, Abdullo Yarmukhamedov was appointed the first People's Commissar for Internal Affairs. On 5 February 1925, 33 NKVD officers were transferred from Tashkent to Dushanbe, where they would be stationed permanently as part of the NKVD division in Dyushambe the next day.

== Modern history ==
The Tajikistani Internal Troops were officially founded on 10 April 1993, over a month after the founding of the Armed Forces of the Republic of Tajikistan. It was founded originally as a Directorate. In 2011, by decree of the Government of Tajikistan, the Internal Troops was expanded in the number of personnel, in a number of cities and regions of the country additional locations of Military Unit No. 3503 were created. Since Tajikistan's independence from the USSR, over 1,700 personnel of the internal troops were killed in the line of duty.

== Role ==
It has the following duties:

- Assisting the internal affairs bodies in protecting public order, ensuring public safety and the legal regime of the state of emergency.
- Ensuring the protection and defense of especially important and especially sensitive facilities, facilities on communications and special cargoes.
- Participation in the territorial defense of Tajikistan.
- Participation in the fight against terrorism.
- Protection of warehouses of the Ministry of Internal Affairs.
- Participation in liquidation of consequences of natural disasters, major accidents, catastrophes and other emergency circumstances.
- Other tasks determined by the legislation of Tajikistan.

Being the main agency of the VKD, it is an organized Militsiya (Tajik: Милитсия) that can be deployed during peacetime and wartime across the country to provide military police and government security. It also acts as a reserve force for the larger armed forces, which does not have an organized military reserve. The Presidential National Guard, which is an affiliated unit, provides specialized security to the President of Tajikistan.

== Structure ==
The Internal Troops has 10 military units and numbers 11,000 personnel. They consist of the following units:

- Separate Brigade
- Special-Purpose Operational Brigade
- Special Detachments
  - Mountain Rangers
  - Alpine Skier Unit
- Military Unit 3503 (GBAO)

== Notable personnel ==
- Gulmurod Khalimov
- Mahmud Khudoiberdiyev
- Ghaffor Mirzoyev
