= Police of Tajikistan =

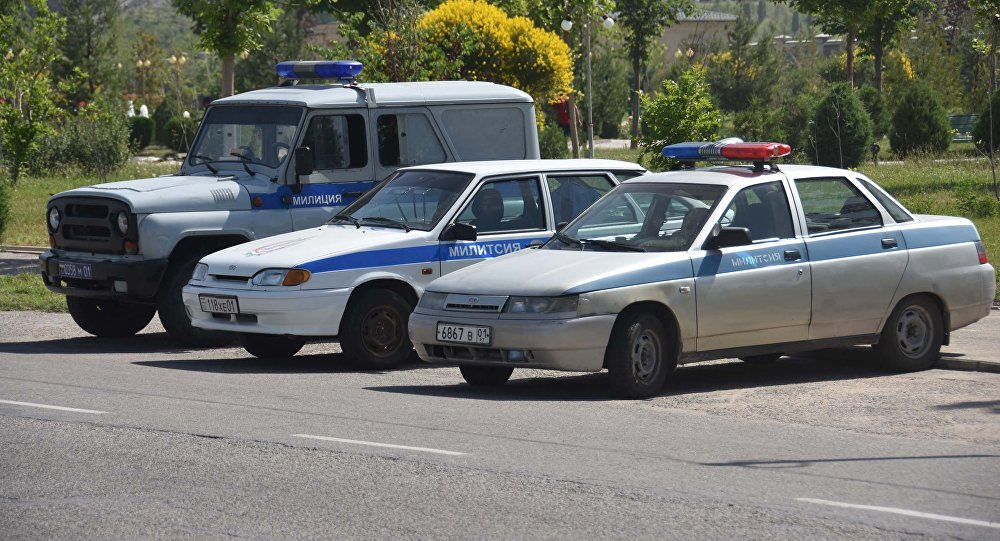
Tajik police cars in 2017.

The Police of Tajikistan (Tajik: Милитсияи Тоҷикистон) is the domestic law enforcement agency (militsiya) of Tajikistan. The Militsiya was originally formed in March 1917, following the February Revolution, and was later put under control of the Ukrainian Soviet Socialist Republic, part of the Soviet Union.

== History ==
On October 10, 1920, the Internal Affairs Inspectorate was entrusted with the responsibility of organizing and managing the militia. In central and southern Tajikistan, along with the activities of the Extraordinary Dictatorship Commission (EDC), the first volunteer militia groups appeared in 1921. The first Tajik militia was founded on 7 December 1924, when the People's Commissariat of Internal Affairs of the Tajik Autonomous Soviet Socialist Republic was formed. A week later on 14 December, Abdullo Yarmukhamedov was appointed the first People's Commissar for Internal Affairs. Until independence, the force was highly centralized under the Soviet-wide administrative system, with management typically composed of non-indigenous officers. The modern service was established on founded in November 1992. Since 2012, very year on 10 November, the police force celebrates Police Day. In 2013, police reform aimed to modernize law enforcement, resulting in the establishment of Community Policing Partnership Teams (CPPTs) in six districts.

== Structure ==
=== Leadership ===
The militia is subordinate to the Ministry of Internal Affairs, and the entire police force of the republic is headed by the Minister of Internal Affairs of the Republic of Tajikistan, who is appointed and dismissed by the President of Tajikistan, on the approval to a joint session of the Assembly of Representatives and the National Assembly of the Supreme Assembly of Tajikistan.

=== Personnel ===
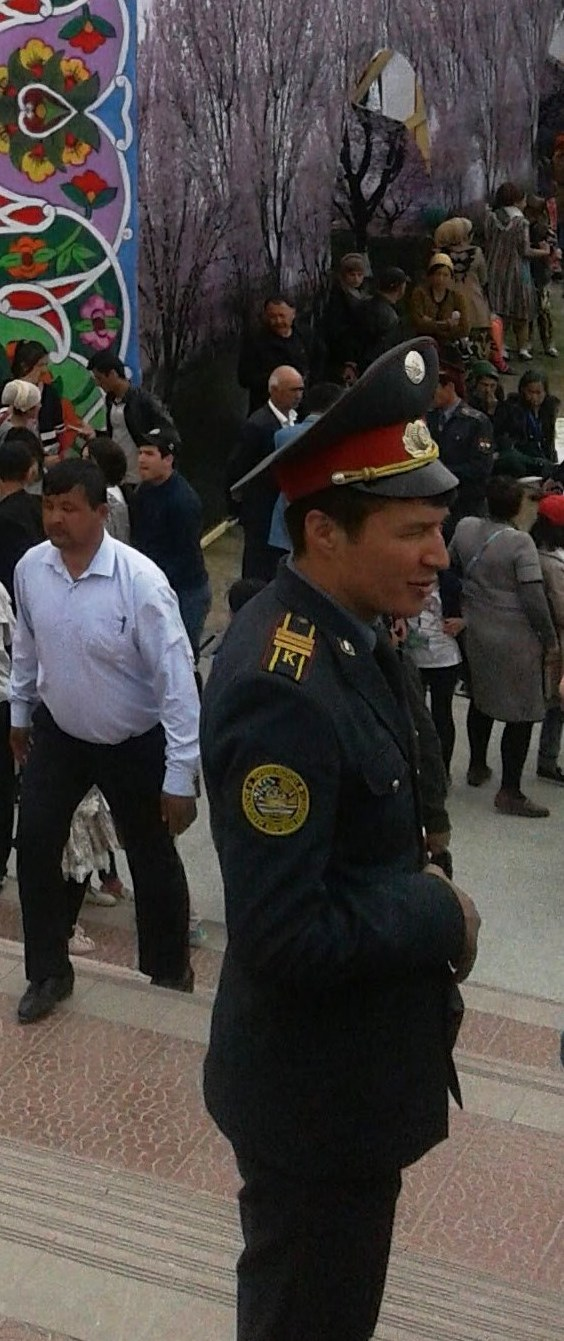
A Tajik police officer

The service uniform and equipment of police officers in Tajikistan are similar to the service uniform and equipment of the Soviet police.

=== Regional Departments ===
The Departments of the Ministry of Internal Affairs (DMIA) are regional agencies affiliated with the VKD that serve the ministry's purpose in their regional areas:

- DMIA of Dushanbe
- DMIA of the Khatlon Region
- DMIA of the Sughd Region
- DMIA of the GBAO
- DMIA of Districts of Republican Subordination

=== Education ===
The primary educational insittuion of the Police is the VKD Academy, specifically Faculty No. 1. On 11 August 2014, a police college was established, located in the building of the Technical School in Kulob, is fully equipped for a comprehensive education, as well as a student dormitory. Upon completion of the Police College, graduates are awarded the rank of police lieutenant and can continue their service in special units of the Ministry of Internal Affairs.

== Equipment ==
The Tajik police use a variety of makes and models of vehicles.

- Lada Priora
- VAZ-2110
- VAZ-2114
- VAZ-2107
- Hyundai Elantra
- UAZ Hunter
- UAZ Patriot
- VAZ-2106
- UAZ-452

== See also ==
- Militsiya (Belarus)
- Police Command of the Islamic Republic of Iran
- Law enforcement in Tajikistan
