= National Guard (Tajikistan) =

- Гвардияи миллӣ
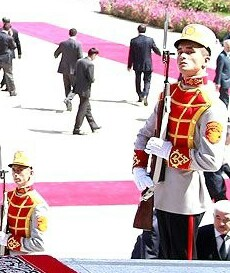
- Members of the ceremonial company of the National Guard at the Palace of the Nation in Dushanbe.
- Founded: 3 September 1995; 31 years ago
- Country: Tajikistan
- Allegiance: President of Tajikistan
- Branch: Armed Forces of Tajikistan (1992–2006)
- Type: National guard, special operations
- Garrison/HQ: Rasht District, Dushanbe
- Nickname: Presidential National Guard
- Mottos: "Service to the Country and the President's Life!" (Ба Ватан содиқона хизмат мекунам!)
- Colors: Red & Grey
- Anniversaries: 3 September (Day of the National Guard/Рӯзи Гвардияи миллии)
- Engagements: Tajik civil war
- Website: http://gmjt.tj/

Commanders
- Supreme Commander-in-Chief: Emomali Rahmon
- Commander: Bobojon Jamolzoda
- Notable commanders: Ghaffor Mirzoyev

The National Guard (Russian: Национальная гвардия Таджикистана, romanized: Natsional'naya gvardiya Tadzhikistana; Tajik: Гвардияи миллии Ҷумҳурии Тоҷикистон, romanized: Gvardiyai millī Jumhurii Tojikiston), formerly called the Brigade of Special Mission and Presidential Guard, is the National Guard service branch of the Armed Forces of the Republic of Tajikistan, under direct command of the President of Tajikistan. Their primary task is ensuring public safety and security, which is similar to the tasks of the Tajik Internal Troops. The National Guard also takes part in ceremonial duties in Tajikistan.

== History ==
=== Founding and Civil War ===
Formed on December 4, 1992, it was originally a special forces unit known as the Brigade of Special Mission during the 16th session of the Supreme Assembly of Tajikistan, under the Tajik Interior Ministry. During its first years, the Guard underwent serious testing, which earned the trust of the President and the people. It was the reason why President Emomali Rahmon changed its name from the Brigade of Special Mission to the Presidential Guard on January 17, 1995.

Within two years, four additional units were formed in the towns of Chkalovsk, Kalinin, and Obigarm. They had a similar structure to the rest of the military. Worthy of note is the honesty that the National Guard has exhibited. The Rapid Reaction Force, also called the First Brigade, under Colonel Mahmud Khudoiberdiyev, took part in the Tajik civil war, as part of the Guard and the regular Army. It became one of the most effective fighting units within the Army, but picked a fight with the 11th Brigade. They defeated the 11th, and attempted to take the capital in November 1998, but were defeated by another Guard unit and street thugs armed with AK-47s. The colonel and his men fled into Uzbekistan.

=== 2000s–present ===
In 2004, the chief of the Guard (as well as head of the Drug Control Agency), Ghaffor Mirzoyev, was arrested for corruption and drug trafficking. On January 26, 2004, the Presidential Guard was transformed into the National Guard. In 2007, it began training with the Special Operations Command Central.

A Mil Mi-8 of the Guard crashed on October 6, 2010, close to Ezgand and Tavildara. The helicopter was caught in power lines while attempting to land, causing it to crash, leaving no survivors. It is Tajikistan's worst aviation accident since 1997.

== Role ==
=== Combat role ===
In a 2007 diplomatic cable released by WikiLeaks, the US Embassy in Dushanbe described the National Guard as “praetorian guards” for the President of Tajikistan Emomali Rahmon. The cable also noted that it receives "the priority of fill and perks within the Tajik defense establishment.”

=== Ceremonies ===
A guard of honor from the National Guard is lined up in honor of newly appointed foreign Ambassadors during the ceremony of the presentation of credentials. During the inauguration of the President on November 18, 2006, the guard received the honor of presenting the Tajik state symbols.

== Structure ==
Under the auspices of the National Guard, there are:

- Department of Command Affairs
- Department of War Training
- Headquarters
  - Operations Department
  - Organization and Mobilization Department
  - Communications, Military and Security Service Division
  - Command Office
  - Military Band (оркестри Гвардияи миллии)
  - Honour Guard Battalion (Баталёни қаровули фахрии)
- Department of Education
  - Patriotic Education Section
  - Military Discipline Section
  - Section for the Prevention of Offenses
  - Section for Psychological Work
- Department of Arms and Equipment
- Center for Personnel Training
- Aviation Division
- Department of Finance
- Medical Department
- Central Hospital
- Newspaper "Rodmardon"
- Dilovaron (pop music ensemble)

== Leadership ==
The management of the National Guard is organized and carried out by the President of Tajikistan in his constitutional role of Supreme Commander-in-Chief of the Armed Forces of Tajikistan. The direct leadership of the National Guard of Tajikistan is carried out by the Commander of the National Guard. The main body of operational management is the General Staff, which is headed by the Chief of the General Staff - First Deputy Commander of the National Guard. The Chief of the General Staff performs the duties of the Commander of the National Guard in his absence.

=== List of commanders ===
- Ghaffor Mirzoyev (1995–26 January 2004)
- Rajabali Rahmonali (26 January 2004–20 November 2013)
- Bobodzhon Dzhamolzoda (20 November 2013–)

== Symbols ==
The Guard has its own badge and battle banner, both with the image of the Emblem of Tajikistan. Regulations on the badge and battle banner are approved by a decree of the President, as well as the insignia of military units and subdivisions of the National Guard. The National Guard has a seal with the image of the coat of arms and the name of the National guard in the Tajik and Russian languages.

=== National Guard Day ===
National Guard day is the professional holiday celebrating the guard's founding. On 2 October 2014, a military parade was dedicated to the founding of the National Guard. In 2010, for the first time in history, a female contingent of 53 women took part in a military parade on the occasion of the 15th anniversary of the National Guard. In September 2020, another parade was held in honor of the National Guard's silver jubilee.

=== Museum ===
The Museum of the National Guard of Tajikistan (Tajik: Осорхонаи Гвардияи миллии Тоҷикистон) is the official historical center for the National Guard. It exhibits include sculptures and photographs of ancient and modern history of Tajik military history.

== Education ==
The main educational institution in the National Guard is the National Guard Training center. In addition to the NGTC, cadets from the branch study at military academies in Russia, the United States and Kazakhstan, becoming qualified officers units of the National Guard. The Military Institute of the Ministry of Defense also maintains its own National Guard Faculty.

== Bibliography ==
- Heathershaw, John (2009). Post-Conflict Tajikistan: The Politics of Peacebuilding and the Emergence of Legitimate Order. Routledge.
