= Drug Enforcement Agency =

Drug Enforcement Agency may refer to:

- Liberia Drug Enforcement Agency
- Philippine Drug Enforcement Agency
- Scottish Crime and Drug Enforcement Agency
- Drug Enforcement Administration, United States
- Drug Control Agency, also called the National Drug Enforcement Agency, of Tajikistan
- Narcotics Control Bureau, India
