= Sultanov =

Sultanov is a Turkic masculine surname common in the former Soviet Union, its feminine counterpart is Sultanova. The name derives from Sultan which means "power" or "authority".

It may refer to:

- Afag Sultanova (born 1987), Azerbaijani Paralympic judoka
- Agabey Sultanov (1938–2007), Azerbaijani psychiatrist, scholar and public activist
- Alexei Sultanov (1969–2005), Russian-American classical pianist of Uzbek origin
- Ayna Sultanova (1895–1938), Azerbaijani Communist party activist and statesperson
- Bakhyt Sultanov (born 1971), Kazakhstani politician
- Ceyhun Sultanov (born 1979), Azerbaijani football player
- Elman Sultanov (born 1974), Azerbaijani football player
- Firiya Sultanova (born 1961), Russian long-distance runner
- Hamid Sultanov (1889-1939), pro-Soviet Azerbaijani politician and husband of Ayna Sultanova
- Jeyhun Sultanov (born 1979), Azerbaijani footballer
- Khosrov bey Sultanov (1879–1947), Azerbaijani politician and general
- Khumoyun Sultanov (born 1998), Uzbek tennis player
- Rain Sultanov (born 1965), Azerbaijani jazz musician
- Sanzhar Sultanov (born 1988), Kazakhstani film director
- Shahin Sultanov (born 1961), Azerbaijani admiral
- Ulduz Sultanov (born 1974), Azerbaijani judoka

== See also ==
- Sultonov
