= Ramazon =

Ramazon is a masculine given name meaning Ramadan in Uzbek and Tajik languages.

Notable people include:

- Ramazon Rahimov, Tajikistani politician
- Ramazon Temurov, Uzbek mixed martial artist
