= Ruslan Maratovich Asainov =

ISIS fighter

Ruslan Maratovich Asainov (born 1976 or 1977) is a naturalized U.S. citizen who left his family and joined the Islamic State in Syria. He eventually rose to the rank of emir. In February 2023, he was charged with five crimes including conspiracy to provide material support, receiving and giving training, obstruction of justice, and support to a terror group that led to the death of one or more persons, by the U.S. Justice Department. He is originally from Kazakhstan and went to the U.S. In 2013, he decided to join ISIS as a sniper. He became responsible for training ISIS soldiers and how to work with weapons. He also sent information to the FBI and was paid for the information. He had posted pictures of war equipment and ISIS fighters. He sent in his message that "We [IS] are the worst terrorist organization in the world that has ever existed."

== Biography ==
He converted to Islam in 2009 and became interested in extreme Islam. He started his studies in the fall of 2013 about radical Islam. In September 2013, he prepared to travel to Syria. On December 24, leaving his wife and daughter, he took a one-way ticket from New York to Istanbul. In 2014, he joined ISIS and he was trained as a sniper. Eventually, he became "Amir" and trained approximately 100 fighters how to use automatic rifles, machine guns, and rocket-propelled grenades. During his five years of association with ISIS, he fought in areas such as Raqqa, Kobani, Tabqa, and Deir ez-Zor. Baghouz in Syria was the last place that Asainov fought in 2019. During his cooperation with ISIS, he tried to recruit another person from America as an ISIS fighter. He also wanted to collect money to buy a gun for that person. In a voice message he sent to his ex-wife, he introduced ISIS as "the most atrocious terrorist organization in the world that ever existed." His ex-wife also said that Asainov sent her a photo of three dead ISIS soldiers. He was arrested at Baghouz near the Iraqi border. He had destroyed his weapon and mobile phone before his arrest. He told his mother on the phone from facilities operated by the Bureau of Prisons (BOP) that if he is released, he will rejoin ISIS until he dies. He had put the ISIS flag on the wall of his room in prison. Asainov said that sometimes it took three hours for me to teach ISIS soldiers how to put their hands on the trigger.

== Trial ==
The federal jury accused him of five crimes including “an indictment charging him with conspiracy to provide material support to ISIS; providing material support to ISIS in the form of personnel, training, expert advice, and assistance; receipt of military-type training from ISIS; and obstruction of justice". His lawyers accepted that he was a member of ISIS, but claimed that there is no evidence to confirm anyone died as a result of Asainov's behavior and beliefs.

FBI Assistant Director-in-Charge Driscoll said it is possible that Asainov has to spend the rest of his life in prison for supporting ISIS. According to the report by George Washington University's Program on Extremism, there were at least 64 Americans who have joined ISIS jihadists since 2011.

== See also ==
- Collaboration with the Islamic State
