= Yusuf Rahmon =

Yusuf Akhmadzod Rahmon (Tajik: Юсуф Аҳмадзод Раҳмон; born March 22, 1966, in Vose' District, Khatlon Region, Tajik SSR, USSR) is a Tajik statesman and prosecutor who serves as the current Secretary of the Security Council of Tajikistan.

== Biography ==
Yusuf Rahmon was born on March 22, 1966, in the Vose' District in the Khatlon Region of the Tajik SSR. After graduating from high school, he entered Tajik State University, graduating in 1991. He worked as an investigator in the Central District Prosecutor's Office of Dushanbe, and from 1992 as a senior investigator. In February 1993, he was transferred to the Prosecutor General's Office as an investigator for particularly important cases, and from November of that year, as a senior investigator for particularly important cases.

From December 1995, he worked as a military prosecutor in the Dushanbe Garrison, and from February 1997, as deputy head of the department and head of the investigative department in the Main Military Prosecutor's Office. In October 1998, he returned to work in the Dushanbe Prosecutor's Office as prosecutor of the Ismoili Somoni district. In June 2002, he was transferred to another district of the city, Sino.

In February 2004, he was appointed Deputy Prosecutor General and Chief Military Prosecutor. In the same year, he was awarded the rank of Major General of Justice. In March 2010, Yusuf Rahmon was appointed prosecutor in the Sughd Region. In January 2012, he was transferred to the post of head of the public security department in the office of the Security Council of Tajikistan, and in January 2015, first deputy head in Executive Office of the President of Tajikistan.

== Prosecutor General of Tajikistan ==
On January 24, 2015, he was appointed Prosecutor General of Tajikistan, replacing Sherkhon Salimzoda. Rahmon's predecessor had also been removed from his post at an extraordinary session of the National Assembly on the same day, exactly five years earlier. However, after a brief intrigue, Yusuf Rahmon was first dismissed from his post and then reappointed as the country's Prosecutor General. As Prosecutor General, he spoke out several times in favor of lifting the moratorium on the death penalty in Tajikistan in 2016 and 2020. On January 23, 2025, he was dismissed from the post of Prosecutor General and was replaced by Khabibullo Vohidzoda, who had previously served as Deputy Prosecutor General and Chief Military Prosecutor of Tajikistan.

== Security Council ==
Since February 4, 2025, he has been Secretary of the Security Council of Tajikistan.

== Personal life ==
He holds the rank of Colonel General of Justice. He speaks Tajik, Russian, and English. According to some news agencies, he is the president's matchmaker; his son, Safarkhon Rahmon, is the husband of Emomali Rahmon's youngest daughter, Farzona.

== Awards ==
- Order of Friendship (October 15, 2025, Russia)
