= Yozghand =

Yozghand Ёзғанд
- Location in Tajikistan
- Coordinates: 38.7258°N 70.4189°E
- Country: Tajikistan
- Region: Districts of Republican Subordination
- District: Sangvor District
- Official languages: Russian (Interethnic); Tajik (State)

Yozghand (Tajik: Ёзғанд, also: Yazgan or Ezgand) is a village in central Tajikistan. It is part of the jamoat Tavildara in Sangvor District, one of the Districts of Republican Subordination. In 2010 Yozghand became known as the closest major village to where the Tajik National Guard Helicopter crash occurred.
