= Ghaffor Mirzoyev =

Ghaffor Mirzoyev (Tajik: Ғаффор Мирзоев), also known as Gaffor-Sedoy (Tajik: Гаффор-Седой) is a Tajik politician who was the former head of the Drug Control Agency in Tajikistan. He was sentenced to life imprisonment in 2004 on charges of abuse of power, privatization of government property, drug trafficking and a host of other charges.

== Biography ==
He was born in Kulyab and by origin belonged to the ruling "Kulyab" clan in the country. His father, a World War II veteran, was one of the first truck drivers in Tajikistan. He himself later was briefly a truck driver, however after graduating from school, he came to the capital and enrolled in the Institute of Physical Education. After the protests Ozodi Square turned violent, he joined the Popular Front of Tajikistan. In 1995, after conciliation procedures, Mirzoyev became the head of the Presidential Guard. During the Tajik civil war, he managed to prevent Mahmud Khudoiberdiyev from reaching the capital. In addition to being the chief of the Presidential National Guard, Mirzoyev served as the head of Tajikistan's National Olympic Committee of the Republic of Tajikistan in 2002.

== Arrest ==
In August 2004, Mirzoyev was arrested along with 15 supporters, and though many claimed that the arrests were politically motivated, most critics still conceded that Mirzoyev was a "corrupt official" with links to the narcotics industry. In 2006, Mirzoyev was sentenced to life imprisonment and deprived of his rank of general and all state awards.

His brother, Abdurasul Mirzoyev, was charged with possession of weapons after 3,000 weapons were found hidden among the Drug Control Agency storehouses, as well as an anti-aircraft missile at his family's home.
