= Negmatullo Kurbanov =

- Born: Negmatullo Kubanov; September 30, 1963 (age 63); Vyborg, Leningrad Oblast, Russian SFSR, Soviet Union
- Military career
- Allegiance: Soviet Union; Tajikistan
- Branch: Soviet Internal Troops; Tajikistani Internal Troops
- Service years: 1984–
- Rank: major general

Negmatullo Saidovich Kubanov (born 30 September 1963) is a Tajikistani major general in the Interior Ministry of Tajikistan. He is the commanding officer of the Tajikistani Internal Troops.

He was born in Vyborg where his father was stationed as a Starshina of a mechanized infantry unit in the 30th Guards Army.
