= Childara =

Village and jamoat in Sangvor District, Tajikistan

Childara Чилдара
- Village and Jamoat
- Location within Tajikistan
- Coordinates: 38°47′N 70°18′E
- Country: Tajikistan
- Region: Districts of Republican Subordination
- District: Sangvor District

Population (2015)
  - Total: 5,841
- Time zone: UTC+5 (TJT)

Childara (Tajik: Чилдара) is a village and jamoat in Tajikistan. It is located in Sangvor District, one of the Districts of Republican Subordination. The jamoat has a total population of 5,841 (2015). Villages: Childara (the seat), Aghba, Bedak, Busholak, Girdob, Damob, Dashti Ghurk, Dastinayho, Dehai Baland, Dehai Mullo, Dehai Safar, Dehi Bolo, Kosagardon, Layronak, Muridon, Norinj, Pasi obitalkh, Pashor, Posun, Razaki Bolo, Razaki Poyon, Rubotnol, Rubotnoli Gharibon, Tagiboghi Shah, Farkisodi, Khamdara, Khujai Khuloz, Haftcharogh, Chashmai Kabud, Cashmasor, Shakob, Shohkahak, Shuri Bolo, Shuri Poyon.
