= Abu Muhammad al-Shimali =

Islamic militant (1979–2017)

- Born: Tarad Muhammad al-Jarba; November 20, 1979; Iraq
- Died: 8 September 2017 (aged 37); Near Deir ez-Zor, Syria
- Occupation: Islamic militant
- Known for: Member of Islamic State

Tarad Mohammad al-Jarba (Arabic: طراد محمد آل الجربا; 20 November 1979 – 8 September 2017), better known by his kunya Abu Muhammad al-Shimali (Arabic: أبو محمد الشمالي), was an Iraqi-born citizen of Saudi Arabia and a senior leader of the Islamic State of Iraq and the Levant (ISIL).

== History ==
Abu Muhammad al-Shimali joined Al-Qaeda in Iraq in 2005, continuing his association with the group when it eventually evolved into and became ISIL. He was from the al-Jarba branch of the Shammar tribe.

== Militant activity ==
According to the United States Department of State Rewards for Justice Program, he served "as a key leader in ISIL’s Immigration and Logistics Committee" and helped foreigners travel to fight in Syria, usually via Gaziantep, Turkey, and the Syrian border town of Jarabulus, which at the time was ISIL controlled. Al-Shimali and his logistics teams also controlled smuggling, financial transfers and movement of supplies into Syria and Iraq from Europe, North Africa, and the Arabian Peninsula.

On September 29, 2015, the U.S. Department of the Treasury placed al-Shimali on its Specially Designated Nationals list for acting for or on behalf of ISIL. The designation blocked his financial assets and prohibited American citizens and financial institutions from dealing with him. On the same day, he was also listed on the United Nations Security Council 1267/1989 (Al-Qaida) Sanctions List, which imposed a travel ban, asset freeze, and arms embargo on al-Shimali. He was also the subject of an active INTERPOL-UN Special Notice (in the name of Tarad Mohammad al-Jarba), which was issued to alert law enforcement agencies worldwide that an individual or entity was subject to UN sanctions.

According to The Telegraph he may have played a role in the November 2015 Paris attacks due to his position in managing the flow of fighters across the Syria–Turkey border.

On 8 September 2017, al-Shimali was killed during a Russian airstrike near Deir ez-Zor, Syria, along with Gulmurod Khalimov. The United States removed al-Shimali from their Rewards for Justice Program in 2022.
