= Press Service of the President of Tajikistan =

The Press Service of the President of the Republic of Tajikistan (Tajik: Хадамоти матбуоти Президенти Ҷумҳурии Тоҷикистон) is an independent department of the Executive Office of the President of Tajikistan. It works to promote the decrees, orders and instructions of the President of Tajikistan, and decisions of the Government of the Republic. The service carries out its tasks in coordination with other state authorities, public organizations and institutions and their press services, as well as with the mass media.

On 5 October 2005, the official website of the President was launched, having been developed jointly by the Press Service, the Information Technology Center of the Executive Office, and the Kaftar Web Studio of the Babilon-T company.

== List of Press Secretaries ==
No.	Press Secretary	Term Start	Term End	President
1	Zafar Sayidzoda	15 November 1995	15 December 2003	Emomali Rahmon
2	Abdufattah Sharifzoda	15 December 2003	29 January 2024	Emomali Rahmon
3	Zarobiddin Qosimi	29 January 2024	Present	Emomali Rahmon
