= Zarshuyon =

Zarshuyon Заршӯён
- Jamoat
- Location within Tajikistan
- Coordinates: 38°47′N 71°13′E
- Country: Tajikistan
- Region: Districts of Republican Subordination
- District: Sangvor District

Population (2015)
  - Total: 4,785
- Time zone: UTC+5 (TJT)
- Official languages: Russian (Interethnic); Tajik (State) (Note: Constitution of Tajikistan)

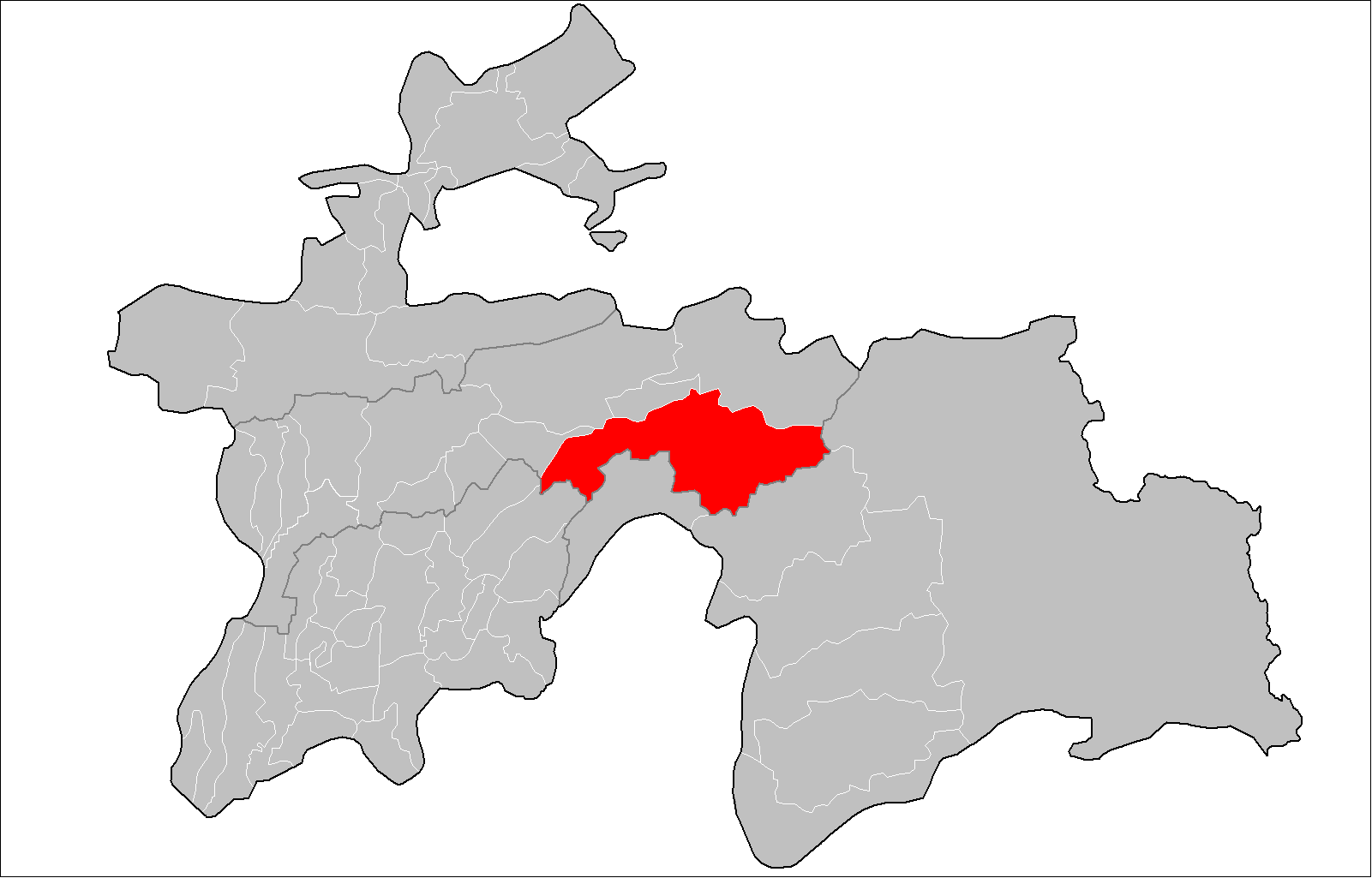

Zarshuyon (formerly Sangvor; Tajik: Заршӯён) is a jamoat in Tajikistan. It is located in Sangvor District, one of the Districts of Republican Subordination. The jamoat has a total population of 4,785 (2015).
