= Ozoda Rahmon =

Tajik politician (born 1978)

- Озода Раҳмон
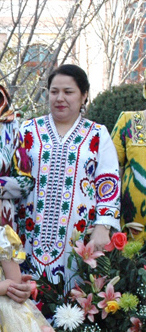
- Rahmon in 2011

Head of the Presidential Executive Office
- Incumbent
- Assumed office 27 January 2016
- President: Emomali Rahmon

Personal details
- Born: Озода Эмомалиевна Раҳмонова; Ozoda Emomalievna Rahmonova; January 3, 1978 (age 48) Danghara, Kulob Oblast, Tajik Soviet Socialist Republic, Soviet Union
- Spouse: Jamoliddin Nuraliev
- Children: 5
- Parent(s): Emomali Rahmon; Azizmo Asadullayeva
- Relatives: Rustam Emomali (brother)
- Education: Tajik State National University
- Occupation: Politician

Ozoda Emomali Rahmon (Tajik: Озода Эмомалӣ Раҳмон; born 3 January 1978) is a Tajikistani politician who is the daughter of Emomali Rahmon, the long-standing authoritarian leader of Tajikistan.

She is among the ten most influential women in Central Asia and 20 most influential individuals in Tajikistan. She has held several senior posts in the Ministry of Foreign Affairs. Rahmon appointed Rahmonova as the chief of staff in his presidential administration.

== Early life and education ==
Ozoda Rahmon was born as Ozoda Emomalievna Rahmonova (Tajik: Озода Эмомалиевна Раҳмонова). She graduated from the Tajik National University with a specialist degree in International Law in 2000. Between 2004 and 2006, she took economics and politics courses at the Georgetown University and English courses at the University of Maryland. In 2012, she was awarded the Candidate of Sciences degree after defending a dissertation on legislation dealing with women's rights in Tajikistan.

== Political promotions ==
Thanks to her status as a daughter of Tajikistan's president, Ozoda Rahmon has enjoyed a number of promotions to senior political offices. Between 2005 and 2007, she served as a culture and education attache at the Tajik embassy in Washington, DC, while her husband studied at the University of Maryland. In September 2007, she was appointed head of the consular department at Tajikistan's Ministry of Foreign Affairs. Two years later, in September 2009, Ozoda Rahmon was appointed a deputy foreign minister. In May 2014, she was promoted to first deputy foreign minister. According to Ozoda Rahmon's official biography, the introduction of biometric passports and national ID cards in Tajikistan came as a result of her initiatives during her tenure at the Ministry of Foreign Affairs.

In January 2016, Ozoda Rahmon was appointed as head of the administration (chief of staff) of president Emomali Rahmon, one of the key government positions in Tajikistan. In May 2016, she was also elected as a senator to the upper chamber of the country's parliament.

Ozoda Rahmon holds a diplomatic rank of the ambassador extraordinary and plenipotentiary.

== Political succession speculations ==
Ozoda Rahmon's political promotions, particularly her January 2016 appointment as the president's chief of staff, has fueled speculations that she might succeed her father as the leader of Tajikistan. In May 2016, a number of major changes were introduced to Tajikistan's constitution in a nationwide referendum. One of the key amendments reduced the minimum eligibility age for presidential candidates from 35 to 30.

== Name change ==
In April 2014, following her father's suit, she changed her name from Ozoda Emomalievna Rahmonova to Ozoda Rahmon, effectively removing the Russian-style patronymic and the "-ova" ending from her surname. Although the short version of her name, Ozoda Rahmon is most frequently used, her full name is Ozoda Emomali Rahmon. She adopted her father's modified surname, Rahmon, rather than his first name, Emomali, as her brother, Rustam Emomali, had done.

== Family ==
Ozoda Rahmon is one of the nine children of Tajikistan's president Emomali Rahmon. She is married to Jamoliddin Nuraliev, first deputy head of the National Bank of Tajikistan, who had previously served as the deputy finance minister from 2007 to 2015. The couple has five children, and her oldest daughter, Shahnoza Nuralieva, studies law in the United States of America. Ozoda's brother, Rustam Emomali, is a senior government official in Tajikistan.
