= Gulmurod Khalimov =

Tajikistani military personnel (1975–2017)

- Born: Gulmurod Salimovich Khalimov (Гулмурод Салимович Халимов); 14 May 1975; Varzob, Tajik SSR, Soviet Union
- Died: 8 September 2017 (aged 42) (alleged); Near Deir ez-Zor, Syria
- Military career
- Allegiance: Tajikistan (1993–2015); Islamic State (2015–2017)
- Branch: Ministry of Internal Affairs (Tajikistan)
- Rank: Lieutenant colonel (Tajikistan); War minister (ISIL)
- Commands: OMON (Tajikistan); Military of the Islamic State
- Conflicts: Tajikistan insurgency Syrian civil war

Gulmurod Salimovich Khalimov (Tajik: Гулмурод Салимович Ҳалимов, Russian: Гулмурод Салимович Халимов) (14 May 1975 – 8 September 2017) was a Tajik and Islamist military commander. He was a lieutenant-colonel and commander of the police special forces of the Interior Ministry of Tajikistan until 2015, when he defected to the Islamic State. In September 2016, he was reported to have been appointed as the minister of war of IS in place of Abu Omar al-Shishani; his appointment had not been announced by IS for fears that he might be targeted in airstrikes by the anti-IS coalition. On 8 September 2017, Khalimov was allegedly killed during a Russian airstrike near Deir ez-Zor, Syria. However, the Tajik government, United Nations, and the United States believed that he was still alive by 2019, though his exact fate remained disputed. By 2020, Islamist militants claimed he had died at some point; this source was considered unreliable by the Tajik government. Regardless, the United States had removed Khalimov from their Rewards for Justice Program by 2021.

== History ==
=== Early life ===
He was born on 14 May 1975 in Varzob, Tajikistan, then part of the Soviet Union.

=== Service with the Tajik security forces ===
Khalimov eventually joined the Tajik security forces and was trained as sniper and rose to lead the Tajik OMON special forces; in this position, he was considered to be "one of the best-trained officers in the country". He helped the government to repress Islamist extremists during the Tajikistan insurgency. From 2003 to 2014, Khalimov participated in five counterterrorism training courses in the United States and in Tajikistan, training with Blackwater and the US Army. There exist no sources that indicate that Khalimov ever received religious training or engaged in preaching.

=== Disappearance ===
Khalimov disappeared in late April 2015 He was notably absent from a 6 May meeting of Interior Minister Ramazon Rahimov with leading police officers at OMON's headquarters in Dushanbe. According to his brother Nazir, both his phone and social media accounts had been deactivated. According to family members, Khalimov left home on 13 April after giving his wife around $200 in spending money, less than the amount he frequently gave her before departing on business trips. Meanwhile, Tajik media quoted unnamed sources in law enforcement as saying Khalimov left Dushanbe on May 1 along with 10 other men, later being seen at Moscow's Sheremetyevo International Airport, Asia-Plus news agency reported.

== Islamic State ==
Khalimov resurfaced on 28 May 2015 in a 10-minute IS propaganda video clip posted in social networks and released by Al-Furat Media Center, in which he vowed to "bring jihad to Russia", while also lambasting Tajik guest workers in Russia, referring to them as "slaves of infidels".

Although hundreds of Tajiks had already joined IS by this point, Khalimov's defection was an "unprecedented case" due to his being a successful, high profile officer and part of the establishment rather than the poor, from whom Islamist groups mostly recruit. According to regional expert Deirdre Tynan, Khalimov's defection was nevertheless symptomatic, as "there is an element of doubt in people within the [Tajik] civil and security services about what is the trajectory of their countries" and increasing support for radical religious ideologies. Khalimov was the most prominent of the more than 2,000 Tajiks reported to have joined IS.

After joining IS, Khalimov travelled to Syria, where he was war minister and became an important recruiter for the group. Tajik security authorities claimed that Khalimov personally led a unit of 200 militants, including 50 Europeans in Syria, and was involved in planning terrorist attacks in Central Asia as well as Europe. In July 2017, four of his relatives in Tajikistan were killed and three arrested by security forces; according to the government, they were IS supporters.

=== Tajik reaction ===
Tajik Prosecutor-General Manuchehr Makhmudzod announced on 29 May 2015 that a probe had been opened into Khalimov's activities. The Prosecutor-General's Office said on June 3 that Colonel Gulmurod Khalimov was wanted for crimes including high treason and illegal participation in military actions abroad. "Acting for mercenary means, he joined the international terrorist organization calling itself Islamic State," the statement said.

=== US and UN sanctions ===
On 29 September 2015, he was made subject to sanctions by the United States Department of State. He was also made subject to sanctions by the United Nations Security Council Al-Qaeda Sanctions Committee on 29 February 2016.

In August 2016, the United States Department of State issued a $3 million USD bounty on Khalimov under its Rewards for Justice program.

=== Reported death and disputes about his fate ===
On 8 September 2017, Khalimov was allegedly killed during a Russian airstrike near Deir ez-Zor, along with Abu Muhammad al-Shimali, with unconfirmed reports of the attack using Russia's precision BETAB-500 bunker-busting bombs. The United Nations and the Tajik government continued to believe that Khalimov was still alive, albeit not necessarily as a member of IS. In 2019, Tajik authorities stated that Khalimov had relocated to Badakhshan Province in northern Afghanistan. In contrast, the United Nations claimed that he was still in Syria, leading a unit of 600 Tajik militants in Idlib Governorate after losing his position as IS war minister.

On 3 August 2020, Tajikistan's Minister of Internal Affairs Ramazon Rahimov declared that Tajik IS fighters had revealed that Khalimov as well as his family had been killed in an airstrike in Syria, although he later qualified his statement, arguing that these sources were not necessarily trustworthy. Without further proof of his demise, the Tajik government continued to regard him as alive.
