= Shukhrat Sultonov =

Tajik politician (born 1951)

Dr. Shukhrat Muzafarovich Sultanov (Tajik:Шӯҳрат Музаффарович Султонов/Persian: یتشکر سلطان/Russian: Шухрат Музафарович Султанов; born in Dushanbe on May 23, 1951) is a Tajik politician and diplomat. Sultonov was the chief of Presidential Administration for Emomali Rahmon from October 2001 to December 2003.

On 28th of August, 2026 @Emomali Rahmon awarded a 35-th independence medal to Dr Shukhrat Sultanov for his input into the independence of the Republic of Tajikistan

Sultonov led numerous state delegations, participated and spoke at a number of international economic forums, including MERCOSUR Working Group in Rio de Janeiro and St. Petersburg International Economic Forum.

== Biography ==
=== Early career (1975–1992) ===
For 16 years Sultonov had a successful career in the Soviet Komsomol, in 1975 he started his early career in the Leninabad Oblast. Between 1980 and 1990, he held senior roles in the Central Committee in the Komsomol. He was promoted in 1987 and was sent to Komsomol headquarters in Moscow to attend the Academy of Social Sciences of the Komsomol.

In 1991, he was elected as a vice-chairman of the International Affairs Committee of Supreme Soviet of the USSR in Moscow.

=== Political career (1992–2015) ===
After the collapse of the Soviet Union Sultonov joined the government of the newly formed Republic of Tajikistan as a Deputy Minister of Energy and Industry. In 1996, Sultonov was appointed as Ambassador of Tajikistan in the Commonwealth of the Independent States in Moscow. In October 2001, Sultonov was appointed as the chief of Presidential Administration for the President of Tajikistan Emomali Rahmon. Between January 2004 to August 2015, he served as the Tajik Ambassador in Turkey and Ukraine.

=== Academic career (2015-now) ===
After the retirement from the political career, Dr Sultonov started as a professor of the Moscow State University, and was appointed as a professor/lecturer of the International Relations Faculty of the Dushanbe branch of the Moscow State University.

== Education ==
- 1973 - Graduated from Tajikistan University of Technology
- 1987-1990 - Studied at the Academy of Social Sciences of the Komsomol
- 1998 - Graduated from the Diplomatic Academy of the Ministry of Foreign Affairs PhD Economics
- 2006 - Graduated from the Russian Presidential Academy of National Economy and Public Administration PhD Political science
