= Prosecutor General of Tajikistan =

The Prosecutor General of Tajikistan (Tajik: Прокурори генералии Тоҷикистон) is the highest-ranking position in Tajikistan's prosecutorial system, overseeing the enforcement of legality throughout the country.

== History ==
By the resolution of the Revolutionary Committee of the Tajik Autonomous Soviet Socialist Republic of December 14, 1924, the People's Commissariat of Justice and the State Prosecutor's Office of the Tajik ASSR were established. After the formation of the Tajik SSR, the Prosecutor's Office of the Republic, the GBAO, vfregional, city and district prosecutor's offices were established. By the Resolution of the Central Executive Committee and the Council of People's Commissars of the USSR, the prosecutor's office was separated from the People's Commissariat of Justice as an independent body, and the Office of the Public Procurator of the USSR assumed leadership of the activities of the republican prosecutor's offices. The structure of the USSR Prosecutor's Office established the Chief Military Prosecutor and the Chief Prosecutor of Railway Transport. However, for several more years, the employees of the republican prosecutor's offices were subordinate to both the USSR Prosecutor's Office and the People's Commissariat of Justice of the republics. On June 20, 1936, by a decree of the Supreme Soviet, the prosecutors of all republics were removed from the composition of the People's Commissariat of Justice and placed under the jurisdiction of the Prosecutor General of the USSR.

== Duties ==
According to the Law "On the Prosecutor's Office of the Republic of Tajikistan", the tasks of the prosecutor's office are to ensure the rule of law, strengthen legality and legal order in order to protect the independence and sovereign rights of the Republic of Tajikistan; socio-economic, political and other rights and freedoms of citizens; the foundations of the democratic structure of state power, the legal status of local Councils of People's Deputies, state bodies and public organizations.

== Nomination ==
According to the requirements of the Constitution of Tajikistan, the unified centralized system of the prosecutor's office is headed by the Prosecutor General. The Prosecutor General is responsible to the National Assembly of Tajikistan and the President, is appointed for a term of 5 years, appoints and dismisses subordinate prosecutors. The term of office of prosecutors is 5 years. By Resolution of the Supreme Council of the Republic of Tajikistan No. 604 of , Nurullo Huvaidulloev was appointed as the first Prosecutor General of the Republic of Tajikistan.

== List of prosecutors general ==
=== Tajik SSR ===
- S. Hajiyorov (1931-1933)
- C. Imamov (1933)
- A. Rosenberg (1933–34)
- P. Lebedev (1934–35)
- I. Ilyin (1935–38)
- A. Romanov (1938–48)
- N. Jogin (1948-58)
- H. Huseynov (1958–61)
- V. Bulargin (1961–73)
- A. Shelochinin (1973–82)
- Y. Sherbakov (1982–86)
- G. Mikhailin (1986–90)

=== Since independence ===
The Prosecutor's Office has been headed by:

- Nurullo Huvaidulloev (March 14 - August 24, 1992)
- Mahmadnazar Solehov (1992–1995)
- Amirkul Azimov (1995–1996)
- Salomiddin Sharopov (1996–2000)
- Bobojon Bobokhonov (2000–2010)
- Sherkhon Salimzoda (2010–2015)
- Yusuf Rahmon (2015–January 27, 2025)
- Habibullo Vohidzoda (since January 2025)
