= Executive Office of the President of Tajikistan =

- Дастгоҳи иҷроияи Президенти Тоҷикистон
- Flag of the President of Tajikistan

Agency overview
- Formed: 1991
- Jurisdiction: Government of Tajikistan
- Headquarters: 20 Shotemur Street, Dushanbe, Tajikistan
- Agency executive: Ozoda Rahmon, Chief of Staff of the Executive Office
- Key documents: Clause 10, Article 69, Constitution of Tajikistan; Article 8, Law "On the system of public administration of the Republic of Tajikistan"
- Website: president.tj

The Executive Office of the President of Tajikistan (Tajik: Дастгоҳи иҷроияи Президенти Тоҷикистон, romanized: Dastgohi idorakunii Prezidenti Toçikiston) is a standing advisory body set up by the President of Tajikistan. The administration is currently led by Ozoda Rahmon, serving in that position since 27 January 2016.

== Heads of the Administration ==
- Sultan Mirzoshoev (1993–1994)
- Talbak Nazarov (1994)
- Shukhrat Sultonov (October 2001 – 13 December 2003)
- Mahmadnazar Salihov (13 December 2003 – 1 December 2006)
- Amirsho Miraliyev (1 December 2006 – 10 March 2010)
- Matlubkhon Davlatov (10 March 2010 – 5 January 2012)
- Bakhtiyor Khudoyorzoda (5 January 2012 – 27 January 2016)
- Ozoda Rahmon (27 January 2016 – Present)

== Structure ==
=== Leading Personnel ===
Title	Incumbent
Chief of Staff	Ozoda Rahmon
Assistant to the President for Economic Issues	Hikmatullozoda Nematullo
Assistant to the President for Foreign Relations	Sharifi Azamsho Latifzod
Assistant to the President for Personnel Issues	Asadullo Rahmon
Assistant to the President for Social Development and Public Relations	Anvar Safarzoda
Assistant to the President for Legal Affairs Plenipotentiary - Representative of the President in the National Assembly and Assembly of Representatives	Zarif Alizoda
Assistant to the President on National Security Issues	
Press Secretary	Zarobiddin Qosimi
Protocol Service	Shermukhammad Rajabzoda

=== Departments ===
- Secretariat of the President
- Protocol Service of the President
  - Director
  - Deputy Director
  - Department for Presidential Visits
  - Department for Reception of Delegations and Events
  - Translation Department
- Press Service of the President
- Secretariat of the Security Council of Tajikistan
- Secretariat of the Prime Minister of Tajikistan
- Legal Department
- Department of Strategic Planning and Reforms
- Finance Department
- Department of Work with Local Government Bodies
- Department of Social Development
- Department of Education, Culture and Information
- Department of Infrastructure Development
- Department of Agriculture and Environmental Protection
- Department of Foreign Relations
- Department of Records Management and National Security Control
- Department of Human Rights Guarantees
- Translation Division
- Division of Religion, Streamlining of Traditions, Celebrations and Ceremonies
- Center for Information and Communication Technologies
- Division of Science and Innovation
- Division of Labour, Migration and Employment of Population
- Human Resources Division
- Sector of special works
- Central Accounting
- Maintenance Department

=== Legal entities subordinate to the Executive Office ===
- Palace of the Nation
  - National Flag Park
- Palace of Unity
- Kokhi Borbad State Complex
- Directorate for the construction of government facilities
  - "Shifo" Sanatorium
  - "Khoja Obigarm" Sanatorium
  - Research, Design and Survey Institute "SANIIOSP"
- Iskandarkul Residence
- National Library of Tajikistan
- National Museum
- Botanical Garden of Khujand
- Hotel Complex
  - Iram Garden
  - Kokhi Istiklol
  - State Institution "Istiklol"
  - Chamanoro Restaurant
  - National Park
  - Avesto
  - Moscow Branch
- Eliminated
- State Symphony Orchestra
- Medical Center
  - Stomatologist
  - Pharmacy
- Sayod Residence, Danghara District
- State Unitary Enterprise "Repair and Construction"
- State Unitary Enterprise "Trade and Public Catering"
- "Sharqi Ozod" Polygraphic Complex
- Tajikistan Trading Center

== See also ==
- Presidential Administration of Russia
- Executive Office of the President of the United States
