= Saraya al-Madina al-Munawara =

Iraqi militant organization

- سرايا المدينة المنورة
- Dates active: 2007—Present
- Ideology: Jihadism; Sunni Islamism

Saraya al-Madina al-Munawara (Arabic: سرايا المدينة المنورة, romanized: Sarāyā al-Madīnah al-Munawwarah, lit. 'The Honored City's Brigades') is a Jihadist Iraqi and Sunni Islamist militant organization that operated during the Iraq war.

== History ==
Saraya al-Madina al-Munawara was established in mid-2007 during the Iraq war against United States coalition soldiers and the Iraqi government. Though they were Jihadist, they had no affiliations with Al-Qaeda. The group was allies with the Islamic Army in Iraq, 1920 Revolution Brigades, and the Islamic State of Iraq without being under any umbrella organization.

Saraya al-Madina al-Munawara continued fighting in Iraq and expanded its operation during the start of the Syrian civil war. Though after the United States withdrawal from Iraq, the group became more underground with their operations. During the rise of the Islamic State in Iraq and Syria, Saraya al-Madina al-Munawara stated that they had good relations with the Islamic State though they had little to do with much of the fighting that was going on at the time.
