= Panj District =

Panj District Russian: Пянджский район Tajik: Ноҳияи Панҷ
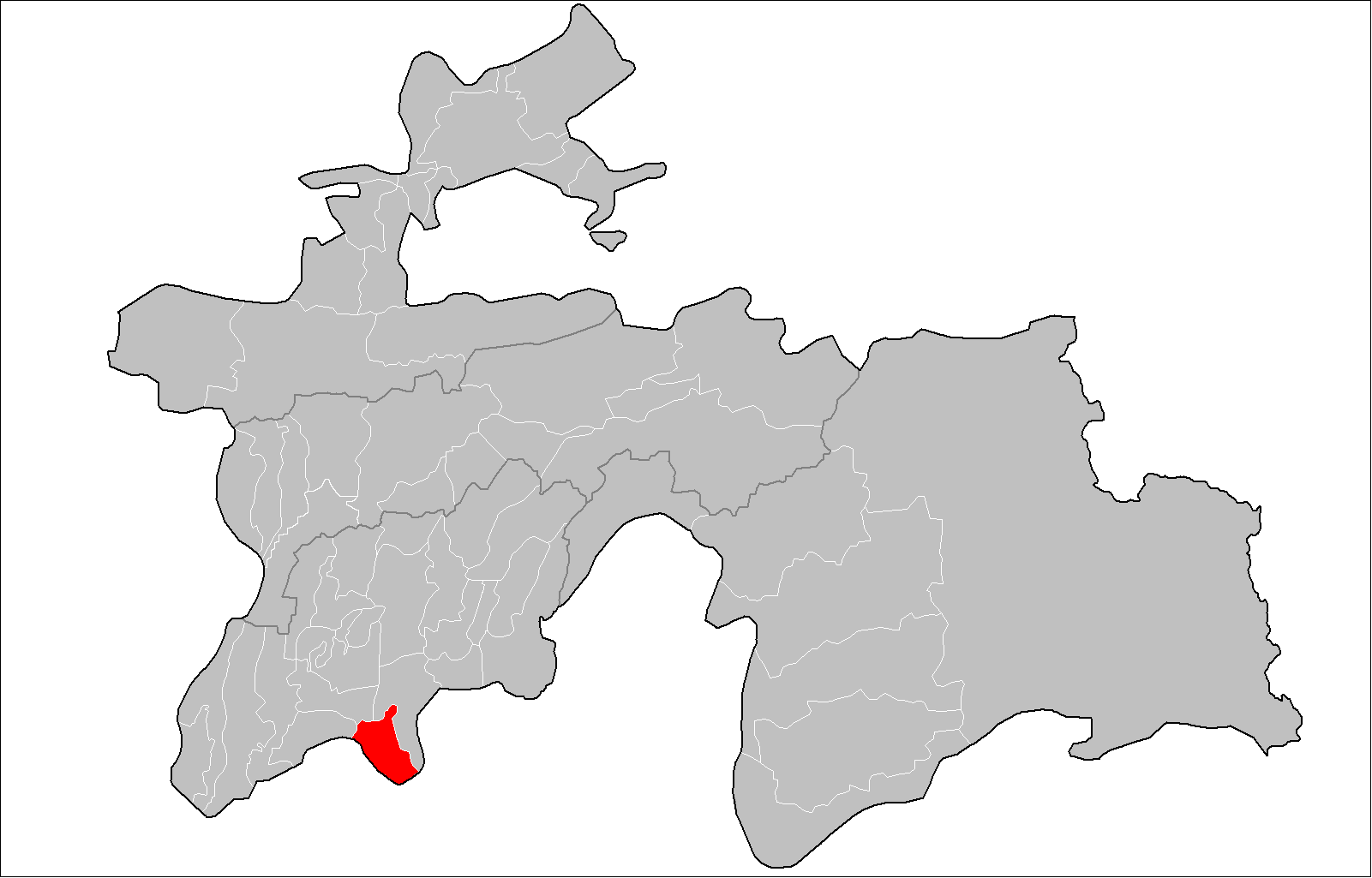
- Location of the district in Tajikistan
- Coordinates: 37°14′N 69°09′E
- Country: Tajikistan
- Region: Khatlon Region
- Capital: Panj

Area
  - Total: 900 km^{2} (350 sq mi)

Population (2020)
  - Total: 119,700
  - Density: 130/km^{2} (340/sq mi)
- Time zone: UTC+5
- Official languages: Russian (Interethnic); Tajik (State)
- Website: panj.tj

Panj District (Russian: Пянджский район; Tajik: Ноҳияи Панҷ Nohiyai Panj) is a district in Khatlon Region, Tajikistan. Its capital is Panj. The population of the district is 119,700 (January 2020 estimate). The district has been an area of ethnic tensions betweek its Uzbek and Tajik residents. During the early Soviet period the district was officially named Kirovobod District.

== Administrative divisions ==
The district has an area of about 900 km^{2} (300 sq mi) and is divided administratively into one town and five jamoats. They are as follows:

Jamoat	Population (Jan. 2015)
Panj (town)	11,700
Kabut Sayfutdinov	22,684
Mehvar	17,298
Namuna	21,321
Nuri Vahdat	13,425
Ozodagon	20,748
