= Agabey Sultanov =

Agabek Ashum Oglu Sultanov (1938–2007) was a prominent Azerbaijani psychiatrist, scholar, and public activist.

Agabek Sultanov graduated from Azerbaijani Medical Institute in 1960. In 1961, he moved to Moscow where, in 1967, he defended his PhD candidacy dissertation, and by 1973, obtained a doctorate degree from the Moscow Serbsky Institute for Social and Forensic Psychiatry. Later he moved back to Azerbaijan. In 1990, Agabek Sultanov became the head of the Faculty of Psychiatry of Azerbaijan Medical University. He was a chief psychiatrist of Azerbaijan, member of World Federation of Psychiatrists, and vice president of the Association of Azerbaijani Psychiatrists on Ethics and Protection of the Rights of Mentally Ill Persons.

Agabek Sultanov published about 200 scholarly works, 32 of which were published abroad.

He was well-known also for his public activism in Azerbaijan, particularly related to the protection and development of cultural heritage.
