= Sangvor District =

Sangvor District Russian: Район Сангвор Tajik: Ноҳияи Сангвор
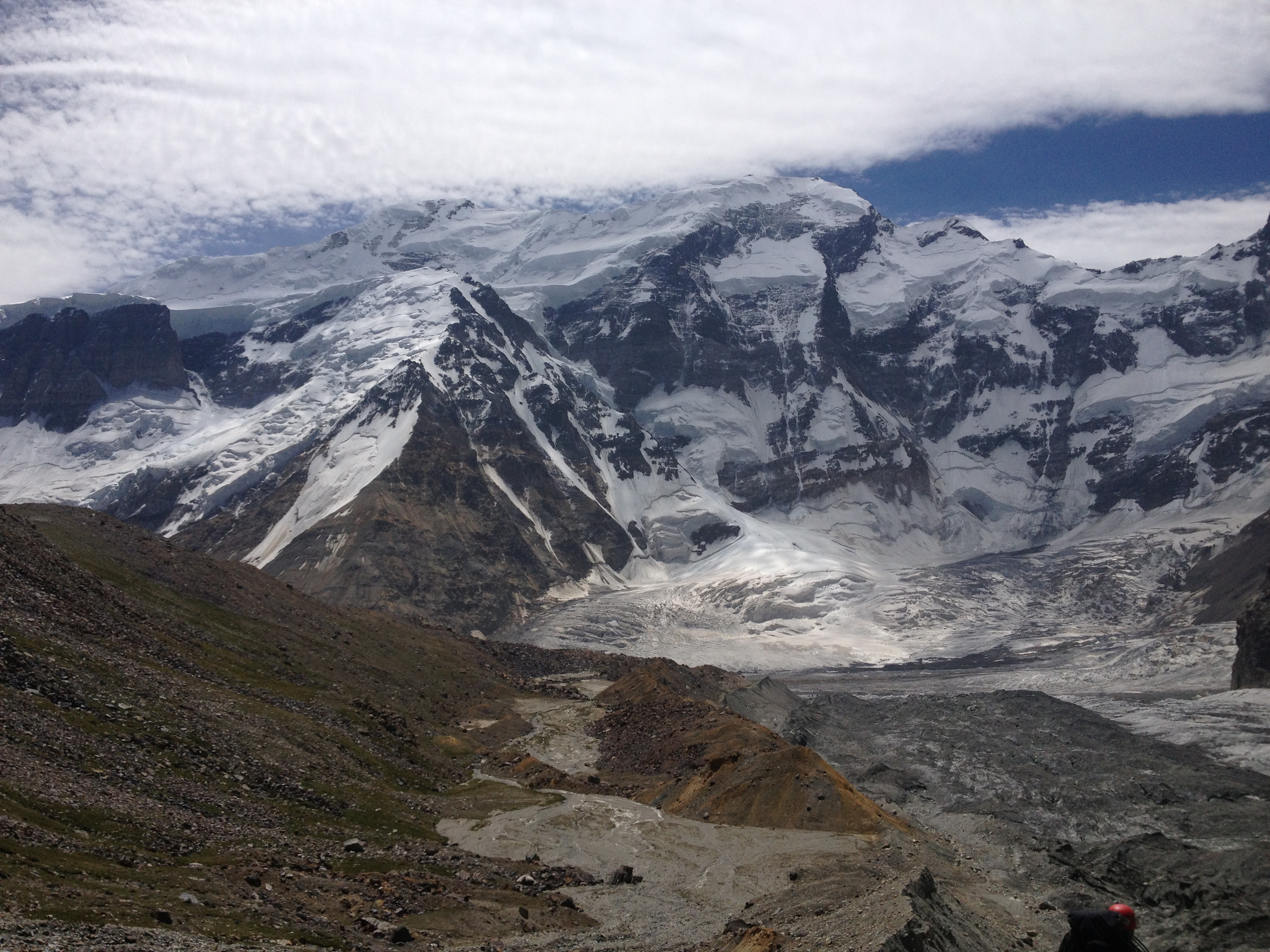

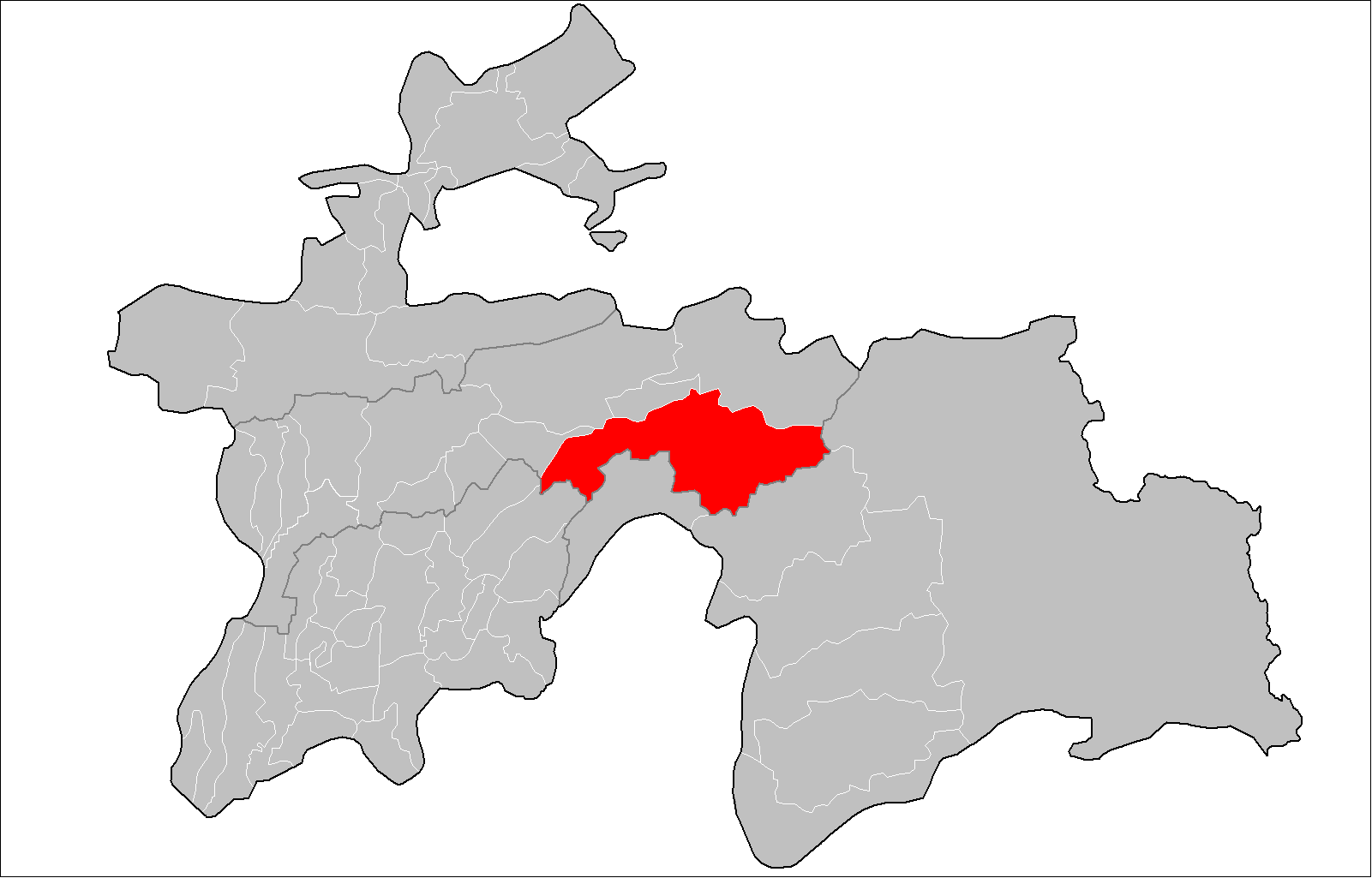
- Location of the district in Tajikistan
- Coordinates: 38°55′N 71°00′E
- Country: Tajikistan
- Region: Districts of Republican Subordination
- Capital: Tavildara

Area
  - Total: 5,954 km^{2} (2,299 sq mi)

Population (2020)
  - Total: 23,300
  - Density: 3.91/km^{2} (10.1/sq mi)
- Time zone: UTC+5
- Official languages: Russian (Interethnic); Tajik (State)
- Website: sangvor.tj

Sangvor District (Russian: Район Сангвор; Tajik: Ноҳияи Сангвор; Nohiyai Sangvor) is a district of Tajikistan. Its capital is Tavildara and the district was known as Tavildara district until 2016. Spread across an area of 5,954 km^{2} (2,299 sq mi), it forms part of the Districts of Republican Subordination. In 2020, the district had an estimated population of 23,300.

== History ==
Tavildara District was established in 1931 in the Tajik Soviet Socialist Republic. It later became a separate administrative district within the Gharm Oblast in 1938. The district was merged with Komsomolabad and Qal'ai Khumb districts in 1955. Tavildara district was re-established in February 1991. It was affected by the Tajikistani Civil War in the mid 1990s (1992–1997). In February 2016, the district was renamed as Sangvor district as part of a broader initiative to replace place names of non-Tajik origin with Tajik names.

== Geography ==
Sangvor District forms part of the Districts of Republican Subordination. It covers an area of 5,954 km^{2} (2,299 sq mi), and its administrative centre is Tavildara. The district is located in the Hingob river valley amidst the Pamir Mountains. It borders the districts of Tajikabad to the north, Lakhsh to the northeast, Vanj and Murghob to the east, Darvoz to the south, Khovaling and Baljuvon to the southwest, Nurobod to the west, and Rasht to the northwest. The district is divided administratively into one five jamoats–Childara, Tavildara, Vahdat, Vakhiyo, and Zarshuyon, which are further sub-divided into 85 villages.

The district has several lakes and hosts more than 100 hot springs, earning it the name "Valley of Waterfalls and Springs". Miri Kalon, near Tavildara, is the largest spring in the district and supplies majority of the district's fresh water supply. According to the Food and Agriculture Organization of the United Nations, the district was being assessed for a pilot project on sustainable forest management in 2025.

=== Climate ===
Tavildara experiences moderate summers and colder winters. June to August are the hottest months with the average summer temperatures ranging between 12 to 16 °C (54 to 61 °F). The winter temperatures range between −10 to −6 °C (14 to 21 °F) in the coldest months between December and February. Average temperatures do not go above 25 °C (77 °F), and remain below freezing for nearly six months in a year. It receives most of the rainfall from February to April with average monthly rainfall of 17.9 cm (7.0 in) during these months.

== Culture and economy ==
According to Tajikistan's Agency on Statistics, Sangvor district had an estimated population of 23,300 in 2020. The economy is dependent on agriculture, mainly potatoes and allied activities such as apiculture, horticulture, and animal husbandry. The district administration has been promoting ecotourism. Local cuisine includes kulcha, a type of flatbread, baked in tandoors, and tea. The region is known for its honey, which is used in folk medicine. Other local industries include production of musical instruments, wooden utensils and other traditional crafts. Handicraft include textiles including curtains, quilts, skullcaps, and traditional dresses, in laid with patchwork and embroidery. Rafida, a type of cushion used for baking bread in tandoors, is made in various sizes.

Gushtingiri, a traditional form of wrestling, dating back to 3,000 years, is widely practised in the region. Wrestling competitions are regularly held between villages and during functions such as weddings.
