= Ministry of Internal Affairs (Tajikistan) =

Government ministry of Tajikistan

- Вазорати корҳои дохилии Ҷумҳурии Тоҷикистон

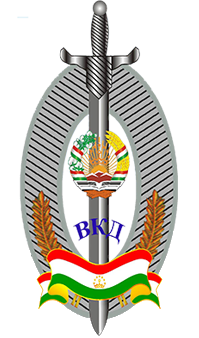

Agency overview
- Preceding agency: Ministry of Internal Affairs of the Tajik SSR
- Jurisdiction: Government of Tajikistan
- Headquarters: Dushanbe
- Minister responsible: Lieutenant General Ramazon Rahimov, Minister of Internal Affairs
- Deputy Ministers responsible: Lieutenant General Abdurahmon Alamshozoda; Major General Makhmasaid Saidzoda; Major General Ikrom Umarzoda; Major General Abdullo Navjuvonov
- Agency executive: Jamshed Mashrabzoda, Head of Executive Office
- Child agencies: Tajik Internal Troops; Police of Tajikistan
- Website: www.vkd.tj

The Ministry of Internal Affairs, also called the Ministry of the Interior, abbreviated VKD, is the interior ministry of the government of Tajikistan. It oversees the Presidential National Guard and the Internal Troops. Since 2012, the Minister of Internal Affairs has been Lieutenant General Ramazon Rahimov. He is responsible for youth crime prevention and working to lower youth crime rates in the country. The law "On Police" was adopted on 7 April 2004 by the Supreme Assembly of Tajikistan to define the duties of the interior ministry.

== History ==
The first Tajik militia was founded on 7 December 1924, when the People's Commissariat of Internal Affairs of the Tajik Autonomous Republic was formed. A week later on 14 December, Abdullo Yarmukhamedov was appointed the first People's Commissar for Internal Affairs. On 5 February 1925, thirty-three NKVD officers were transferred from the Uzbek capital to Dushanbe, where they would be stationed permanently as part of the NKVD division in Dyushambe the next day. During the Soviet era, politicians from Kulob often held high posts in the Ministry of Internal Affairs of the Tajik Soviet Socialist Republic. The Tajik Internal Troops were officially founded in 1993 after the founding of the Armed Forces of the Republic of Tajikistan.

== Ministerial structure ==
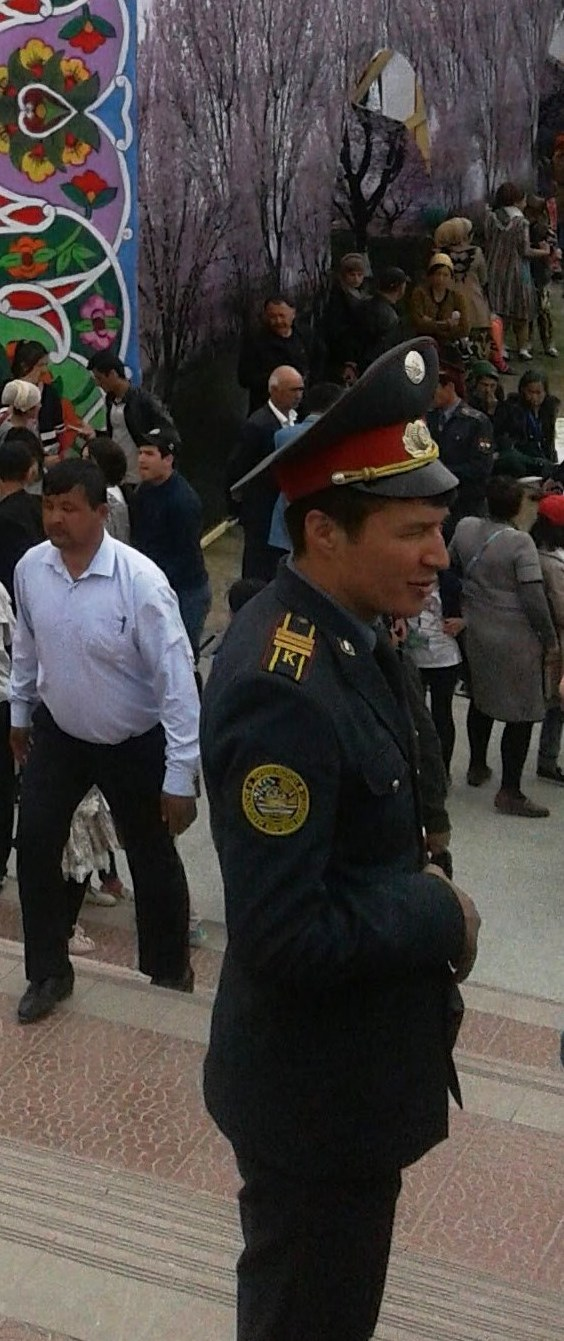
A Tajik police officer.

The VKD is divided into several departments:

- Office of the Minister of the Internal Affairs
- Secretariat of the Ministry
- Organizational and Inspection Department
- Internal Security Department
- Department of International Cooperation
- Investigation Department
- Inquiry Department
- Security Department
- Material and technical and military supply Department
- Personnel management
- Expert-Criminalistics Department
- Main Information and Analytical Center
- Department of Capital Construction
- Criminal Investigation Department
- Financial and Economic Department
- Delinquency Prevention Services
- Department of Public Order and Protection
- Department for Combating Organized Crime
- Department for Combating Drug Trafficking
- Medical Department
- Traffic Police
- Training Center
- Main Directorate of the State Fire Service
- Motor Vehicles Department
- Rapid Reaction Force
- Internal Troops (led by Major General Negmatullo Kurbanov)
- Department of Transport
- Quarantine Platoon
- Military Band
- VKD Academy (led by Major General Faizali Sharifzoda)
- Republican Council "Dynamo"
- National Central Bureau "Interpol"
- Bureau for the Coordination of Combating Organized Crime
- ОМОN
- Department of Communications
- Council of Veterans
- Special Presidential Unit
- Passport and Registration Service
- Coordination Headquarters
- Department of Militia and Ecology
- National Coordination Department for police reform
- Research Center
- Dog Training Center

=== VKD Academy ===
The VKD Academy is the higher educational institution of the ministry which serves to train future soldiers and officers of the Internal Troops. The academic year runs from September to July, with the tuition at the school is US$400–800 per student depending on their department.

== Regional Departments ==
The Departments of the Ministry of Internal Affairs (DMIA) are regional agencies affiliated with the VKD that serve the ministry's purpose in their regional areas:

- DMIA of Dushanbe
- DMIA of the Khatlon Region
- DMIA of the Sughd Region
- DMIA of the GBAO
- DMIA of Districts of Republican Subordination

== VKD units ==
=== OMON ===
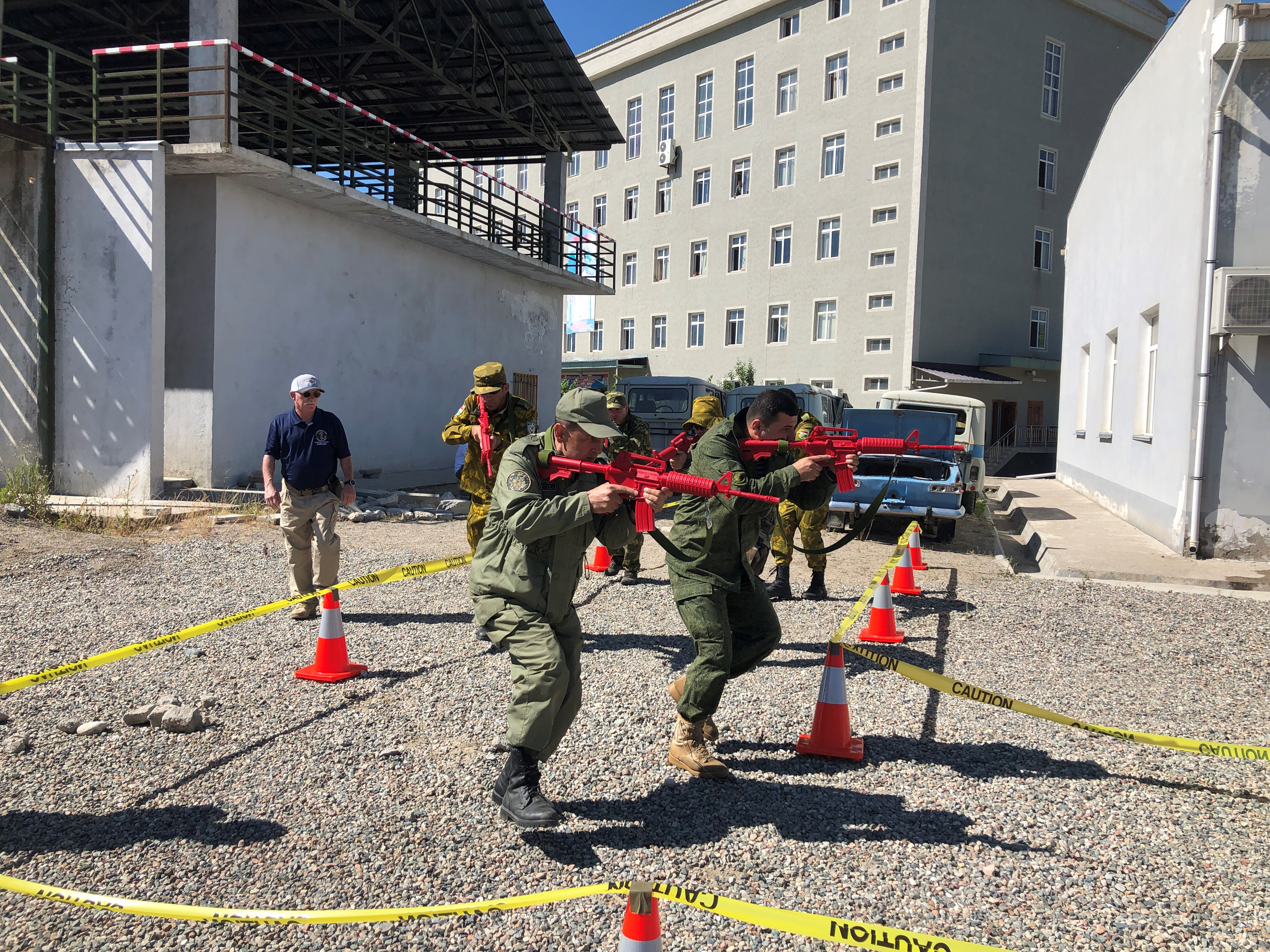
Tajik OMON training with the U.S. Diplomatic Security Service in Dushanbe, May 2019.

The Special Purpose Mobile Unit (Russian: Отряд Мобильный Особого Назначения) or OMON is a special police unit of the VKD, originally created as the special forces of the Soviet Militsiya. The civil war in the country in the 90s was considered to have been caused by the local OMON defecting to anti-Rahmon Nabiyev protesters in May 1992. A significant portion of the OMON at the time consisted exclusively of the minority Pamiri people. In February 2008, OMON commander Lieutenant Colonel Oleg Zakharchenko was killed in a shootout with a police unit composed of former opposition fighters in Gharm. Colonel Gulmurod Khalimov, the former head of the Tajik OMON, made headlines in 2015 when he then defected to the Islamic State of Iraq and the Levant (ISIL).

=== Military Band ===
The Band of the Ministry of Internal Affairs existed even before the collapse of the Soviet Union, under the direction of Senior Lieutenant Oleg Nazarov. After Tajikistan gained independence in 1991, a military formal military band was established under the leadership of Lieutenant Rusht Rushtov and the participation of local soldiers from military unit 6593. It was one of the first military band of the independent state or be founded. In 1994, when Turkish President Süleyman Demirel visited Dushanbe, a group from the band held an official welcome ceremony with the performance of the Turkish military march. Since 1991, the band has sported around 8 to 45 people, with ethnicities ranging from Russians to Tatars to Uzbeks. In February 2010, the former Interior Minister Abduhahim Kuharov awarded the entire band with the anniversary award in honor of the 85th anniversary of the Tajik Militia.

== Police oath ==
The official oath of the VKD was approved January 30, 1995 and is as follows:

I, am a citizen of the Republic of Tajikistan, having now joined the ranks of the units of law enforcement, take my oath and solemnly swear to the end to be loyal to my people, the motherland and the cause to which I devote myself, to be honest, brave, disciplined, vigilant worker, exemplary to serve, to comply strictly with Constitution and laws of the Republic of Tajikistan, and to keep state and official secrets. I swear to faithfully and unquestioningly carry out all my duties, requirements regulations and orders not to spare my strength, if necessary, and of life itself in the protection of social and political system, the rule of law, all forms of ownership, identity and the rights of citizens. If I break my solemn oath, let me suffer the punishment according to the law of the republic.

== List of ministers ==
=== Tajik SSR ===
- Sergey Tarasyuk (1934–1937)
- Nikolai Zagvozdin (1937–1939)
- Pavel Ostapenko (1939)
- Andrei Kharchenko (1943–1950)
- Boris Serebryakov (1950–1953)
- Bobo Makhamov (1954–1972)
- Mamadayo Navjuvanov (1989–1992)

=== Republic of Tajikistan ===
- Yaqub Salimov (December 1993 – 1995)
- Khumdine Sharipov (31 October 1996 – 30 November 2006)
- Mahmadnazar Salihov (1 December 2006 – January 2009)
- Abduhahim Kuharov (January 2009 – 4 January 2012)
- Ramazon Rahimov (4 January 2012 – present)

== See also ==
- Law enforcement in Tajikistan
