= Drug Control Agency =

Agency overview
- Formed: 1999
- Jurisdiction: Government of Tajikistan
- Headquarters: Dushanbe
- Agency executive: Major General of the Drug Control Service Samad Safar, Director

The Drug Control Agency, also called the National Drug Enforcement Agency, is the drug control service of Tajikistan. Formed in 1999, the service was founded to help combat the drug trafficking through the country from Afghanistan, and is one of the most active anti-narcotics bodies operating in Asia.

== History ==
It is estimated that upwards of 20% of Afghanistan's opiates travel through Tajikistan. Between 2000 and 2011, the agency confiscated over 11,000 kilograms of drugs. The agency cooperates with law enforcement bodies of Iran, Kyrgyzstan, Russia, China, Afghanistan, and Uzbekistan. In 2004, the head of the agency, Ghaffor Mirzoyev, was sentenced to life imprisonment for drug trafficking. He was replaced by Lieutenant General Rustam Nazarov.

== Directors ==
Name	Term Start	Term End	President
Ghaffor Mirzoyev	January 29, 2004	August 5, 2004	Emomali Rahmon
Rustam Nazarov	August 2004	February 2, 2016	Emomali Rahmon
Lieutenant General Sherkhon Salimzoda	February 2, 2016	November 18, 2020	Emomali Rahmon
Habibullo Vohidzoda	November 18, 2020	January 27, 2024	Emomali Rahmon
Major General Samad Safar	January 27, 2024	Present	Emomali Rahmon
