= Tavildara =

Tavildara Тавилдара
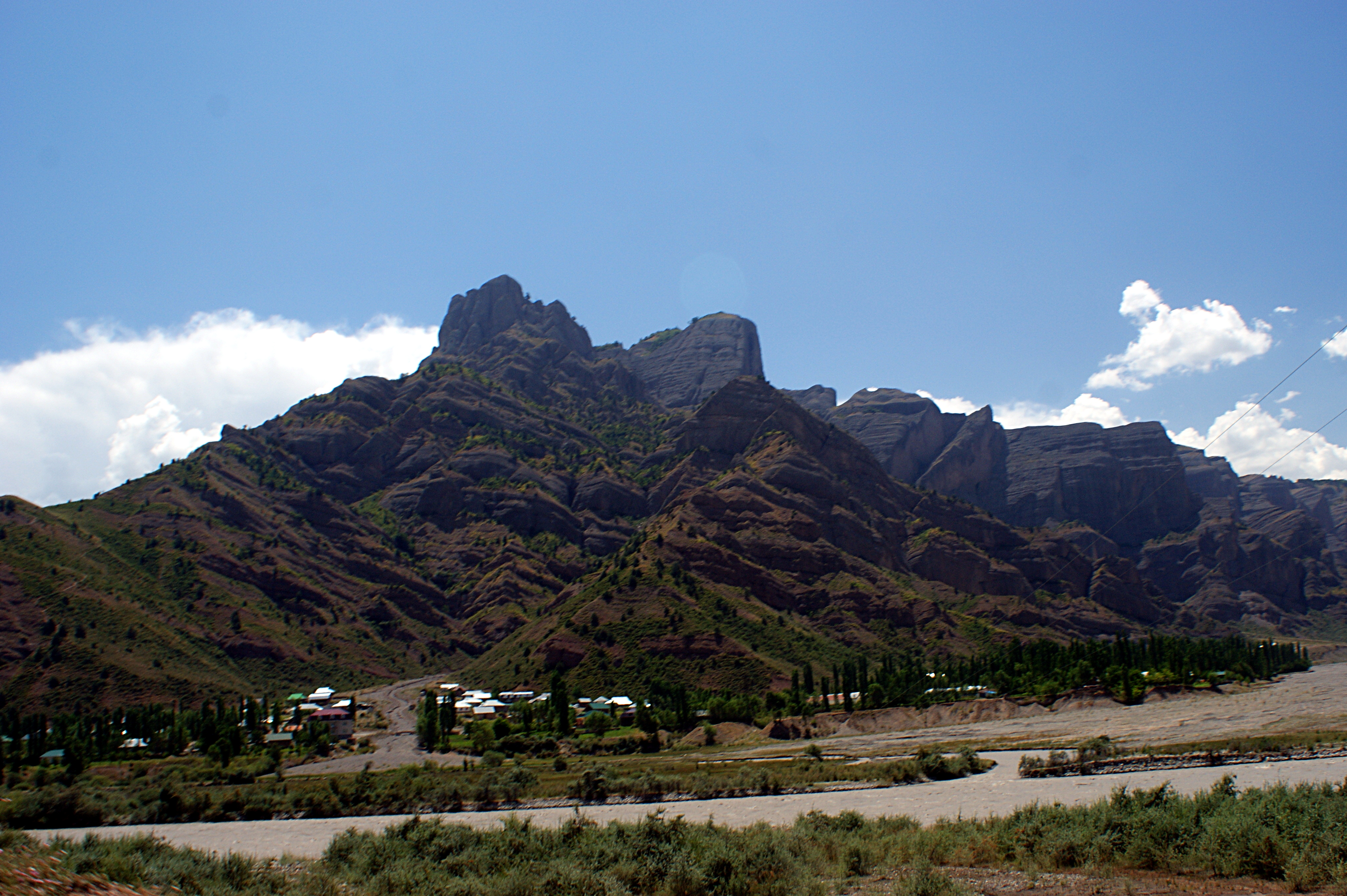
- Tavildara (as seen from M41)

- Location within Tajikistan
- Coordinates: 38°41′37″N 70°29′8″E
- Country: Tajikistan
- Region: DRS
- District: Sangvor District
- Elevation: 1,623 m (5,325 ft)

Population (2015)
  - Total: 5,950
- Time zone: UTC +5
- Official languages: Russian (Interethnic); Tajik (State)

Tavildara is a village and jamoat in Tajikistan. It is located in Sangvor District. It is also the district capital. The jamoat has a total population of 5,950 (2015). It consists of 20 villages, including Tavildara (the seat) and Yozghand.

Tavildara is one of the highest areas in central-eastern Tajikistan, surrounded by the Rasht Valley in the north, the Darvaz mountains in the south and the highest Pamir peaks in the east. It lies on the river Obikhingou (Khingob), a left tributary of the Vakhsh. Tavildara's Valley, also called Vakhiyo Valley, stretches for 130 km along Obikhingou.

This territory is the site of many sacred places, such as Hazrati Burkhi Vali Mausoleum and others.
