= Mahmud Khudoiberdiyev =

Tajikistani politician (1964–2001)

Colonel Mahmud Khudoiberdiyev (Tajik:Маҳмуд Худойбердиев; October 18, 1964, in Qurghonteppa – c. 2001) was a rebel leader in Tajikistan who, while initially an ally of Tajik President Emomali Rahmon, became an opposition figure later on in his life. He was a former member of the Central Committee of the Tajik Communist Party and a former major in the Soviet Army. He also served as commander of the Tajik Army's First Brigade.

== Biography ==
He was born on October 18, 1964, in Qurghonteppa in the family of a construction workers. He is half-Uzbek and half-Tajik. In 1985, he graduated from the Alma-Ata Higher All-Arms Command School, after which he served as part of a limited contingent of Soviet troops in Afghanistan as a reconnaissance platoon commander of the 1st Motorized Rifle Battalion of the 70th Separate Guards Motor Rifle Brigade, during which he was wounded. In 1990, he left for Tajikistan, where he was appointed deputy military commissar of the Dzhilikulsky, then Bokhtar district military commissariats. He has expressed support for recreating the Soviet Union.

== Civil War ==
Khudoiberdiyev helped President Rakhmonov become head of state in 1992, but began a rebellion on 16 August 1997. Two days later, reports of Uzbek government support for his rebellion surfaced, an allegation Uzbek officials denied. Rakhmonov accused former Prime Minister Abdulmalik Abdullojonov of leading the rebellion on 9 November 1998.

His troops killed 10 Tajik government soldiers in Chkalovsk, Tajikistan on 4 November 1998, successfully taking several administrative buildings in Khujand before taking most of Leninabad Oblast. His troops also tried to take control of the city's airport. He asked that at least 40% of all government jobs would be for northern Tajiks. President Emomali Rahmon met with the Tajik Security Council with Zafar Saidov, the president's spokesman, calling the situation "very serious." A few days later the government regained control of the province. When the International Red Cross surveyed the results of the fighting, they found over 2,000 killed, and 500 injured. The government declared November 10 a day of mourning.

The Tajik Supreme Court sentenced two of Khudoiberdiyev's militant followers to death on 27 December 1999 for their involvement in clashes with the government in November 1998. 33 other militants were sentenced to prison terms ranging from 10 to 19 years for terrorism and other related charges. 121 of the estimated 1,000 rebels were arrested. The Tajik government again accused the Uzbek government of protecting Khudoiberdiyev.

== Awards ==
Khudoiberdiyev was awarded the Order of the Red Star, the Order For Personal Courage and the Medal For Courage.
