= Ramazon Rahimzoda =

Tajikistani politician

Colonel General Ramazon Hamro Rahimzoda (Tajik: Раҳимзода Рамазон Ҳамро, born Ramazon Hamroevich Rahimov, Tajik: Рамазон Ҳамроевич Раҳимов) on 25 April 1960) is a Tajikistani politician. He was appointed to the position of Minister of Internal Affairs in 2012.

== Career ==
Rahimzoda joined the Soviet Ministry of Internal Affairs in 1983, and was stationed in Kulob and Leningrad (today Mu'minobod). In 1995, he graduated from the Dushanbe Higher School of the Ministry of Internal Affairs. He was promoted through the Ministry of Internal Affairs of the Republic of Tajikistan, and was appointed as the Minister of Internal Affairs on 5 January 2012. He said that one of his goals is to lower youth crime rates. In 2012 he met with his Chinese counterpart Meng Jianzhu, and the two sides discussed the issue of drug smuggling and signed a memorandum regarding cooperation in the border area.

== Personal life ==
Rahimzoda is said to be physically fit and good at chess. He is married and has three sons and two daughters.
