= Roads in Tajikistan =

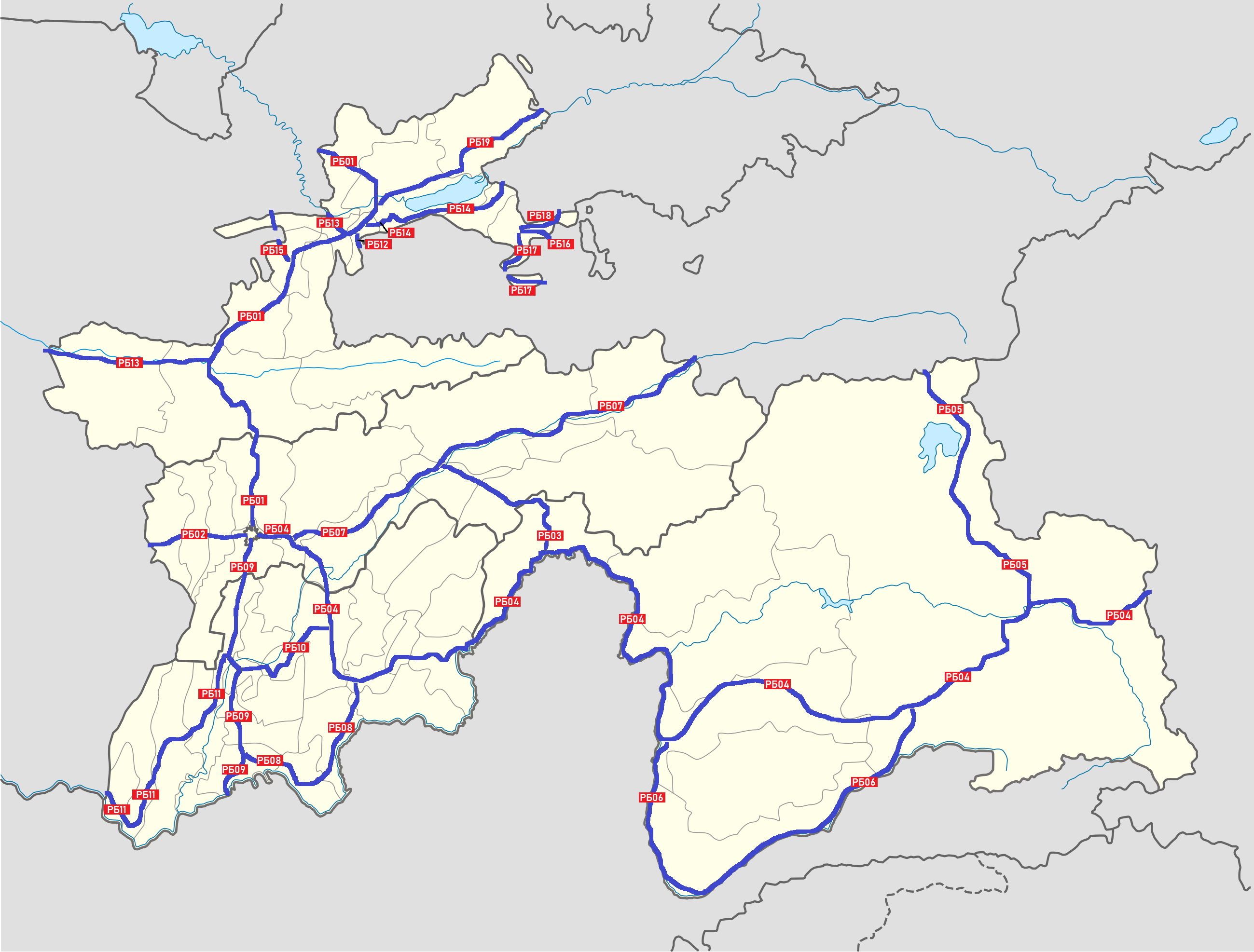
Map of Highways of International importance in Tajikistan

A list of roads in Tajikistan.

== Systems ==
The highways in Tajikistan are divided into two groups, based on the level of their significance whose names differ by a code letter.

- РБ – highways of international significance (Tajik: Роҳи Байналмилалӣ, Rohi Baynalmilaly); РБ01 to РБ19
- РҶ – highways of republic significance (Tajik: Роҳи Ҷумҳуриявӣ, Rohi Jumhuriyavy); РҶ001 to РҶ095

== International Highways ==
| Road | Direction | Previous Designation | Length |
|---|---|---|---|
| РБ01 | Dushanbe - Ayni ( РБ12 ) - Khujand - Buston - Border of Uzbekistan | M34/A376/R35/R33 | 355 km |
| РБ02 | Dushanbe - Tursunzoda - Border of Uzbekistan ( M41 ) | M41 | 66.3 km |
| РБ03 | Labi Jar ( РБ07 ) - Tavildara - Qal'ai Khumb ( РБ04 ) | M41 | 136 km |
| РБ04 | Dushanbe - Vahdat - Kulob - Qal'ai Khumb - Khorugh - Murghob - Border of China | M41/A385/R23/R44 | 1023 km |
| РБ05 | Murghob ( РБ04 ) - Border of Kyrgyzstan | M41 | 187 km |
| РБ06 | Khorugh ( РБ04 ) - Ishkoshim -Tuzkul ( РБ04 ) | R45 | 320.4 km |
| РБ07 | Vahdat ( РБ04 ) - Gharm (Rasht) - Vahdat (Jirgatol) - Border of Kyrgyzstan ( ЭМ-06 | M41/A372 | 329 km |
| РБ08 | Gulistan ( РБ04 ) - Farkhor - Panj - Dusti ( РБ09 ) | A385/R14 | 140.8 km |
| РБ09 | Dushanbe - Qizilqala - Bokhtar - Dusti ( РБ08 ) - Panji Poyon - Border of Afghanistan | A384/R14 | 181.8 km |
| РБ10 | Bokhtar - Danghara ( РБ04 ) | R15 | 71 km |
| РБ11 | Qizilqala ( РБ09 ) - Qubodiyon - Shahritus - Aivaj - Border of Uzbekistan ( D168 ) | A384 | 168.2 km |
| РБ12 | Mehrobod - Border of Kyrgyzstan ( ЭМ-12 | P152 | 9.4 km |
| РБ13 | Ayni ( РБ01 ) - Panjakent - Border of Uzbekistan | А377 | 112.7 km |
| РБ14 | Border of Uzbekistan ( A376 ) - Konibodom - Ghafurov - Dehmoy ( РБ01 ) | A376/P154 | 56.8km |
| РБ15 | Istaravshan - Uzbekistan territory ( M34 ) - Zafarobod - Border of Uzbekistan ( M34 ) | M34 | 10 km |
| РБ16 | Isfara - Border of Kyrgyzstan (Batken) | R153 | 10 km |
| РБ17 | Isfara - Surkh - Border of Kyrgyzstan - Vorukh Exclave | | 43.9 km |
| РБ18 | Isfara - Dahana - Border of Uzbekistan ( D098 ) | R154 | 24.5 km |
| РБ19 | Ghafurov - Mehrobod - Border of Uzbekistan ( D017d ) | R34 | 122 km |

== Republic Highways ==
| Road | Direction | Length |
|---|---|---|
| РҶ001 | Hushyori ( РБ01 ) - Khoja Obi Garm Resort | 5.7 km |
| РҶ002 | РБ01 (km 75) - Kalon - Sangkhok Springs | 12 km |
| РҶ003 | РБ15 - Havatog Resort | 10.1 km |
| РҶ004 | Pugus ( РБ01 ) - Safed Dara - Safedorak | 18.3 km |
| РҶ005 | Varzob Hydro Electric Plant ( РБ01 ) - Kharangon | 10.9 km |
| РҶ006 | Shahrinav ( РБ02 ) - Mirzo Tursunzoda (Chiptura Railway Station) | 6 km |
| РҶ007 | Shahrinav ( РБ02 ) - Qaratogh Resort | 3.4 km |
| РҶ008 | Shahrinav ( РБ02 ) - Qaratogh Village | 4.5 km |
| РҶ009 | РБ02 - Tursunzoda | 3 km |
| РҶ010 | РБ02 - Hisor | 7 km |
| РҶ011 | РБ02 - Almosi | 12.2 km |
| РҶ012 | РБ02 - Shohambari | 8.3 km |
| РҶ013 | РБ02 - Tursunzoda (From the West) | 2.8 km |
| РҶ014 | Yangi Shahar - Tandiqul (Tandykul) | 22 km |
| РҶ015 | РБ07 - Darband - РБ07 | 4.2 km |
| РҶ016 | Sari Pul ( РБ07 ) - Navobod | 18.2 km |
| РҶ017 | Hoit ( РҶ021 ) - Nazarayloq Coal Mine | 42km |
| РҶ018 | РБ07 - Vahdat (Jirgatol) (From the Southwest) | 4 km |
| РҶ019 | РБ07 - Vahdat (Jirgatol) (From the Southeast) | 2 km |
| РҶ020 | Vahdat (Jirgatol) - Jirgatol Airport | 1.6 km |
| РҶ021 | Sayron ( РБ07 ) - Hoit ( РҶ017 ) - Nimich ( РБ07 ) | 32 km |
| РҶ022 | Vahdat ( РБ04 ) - Romit | 37 km |
| РҶ023 | Khujaloni ( РБ04 ) - Chormaghzak ( РҶ024 , РҶ097 ) | 8.4 km |
| РҶ024 | Chormaghzak ( РҶ097 ) - Yovon ( РҶ043 ) | 23.0 km |
| РҶ025 | РБ04 - Norak | 5.3 km |
| РҶ026 | Danghara - Kangurt ( РҶ031 ) - Baljuvon - Khovaling ( РҶ032 , РҶ095 ) | 64.4 km |
| РҶ027 | Olimtoyi Khurd ( РБ04 ) - Somoniyon ( РҶ028 ) | 9.8 km |
| РҶ028 | Nuri Sharq ( РБ08 ) - Shaftolubogh - Dehqonobod - Somoniyon ( РҶ027 ) - РБ08 | 29.8 km |
| РҶ029 | Hulbuk ( РБ04 ) - Maskav | 13.1 km |
| РҶ030 | Qurbonshahid ( РБ04 ) - Temurmalik ( РҶ031 ) | 31.8 km |
| РҶ031 | Temurmalik ( РҶ030 ) - Kangurt ( РҶ026 ) | 27 km |
| РҶ032 | Hulbuk ( РБ04 ) - Khovaling ( РҶ026 , РҶ095 ) | 87.7 |
| РҶ033 | Kulob ( РБ04 , РҶ035 ) - Ziraki ( РҶ034 ) - Mu'minobod | 41.8 km |
| РҶ034 | Ziraki ( РҶ033 ) - Dahana | 6.8 |
| РҶ035 | Kulob ( РҶ033 ) - Kulob Airport | 3.5 km |
| РҶ036 | Tugarak ( РБ04 ) - Sarichashma - Chagam - Shuroobod ( РБ04 ) | 47.5 km |
| РҶ037 | Qal'ai Khumb ( РБ04 ) - Dashti Luch Airport | 6.9 km |
| РҶ038 | Vahdat ( РБ04 ) - Vanj - Tekharv | 16 km |
| РҶ039 | РБ04 - Vahdat - Porshinev | 4.6 km |
| РҶ040 | Andarob ( РБ06 ) - Garmchashma Resort | 6.2 km |
| РҶ041 | Khorog ( РБ04 , РБ06 ) - Roshtqal'a - Tuquzbuloq River Valley ( РБ04 ) | 154 km |
| РҶ042 | Dushanbe - Somoniyon (Rudaki) - Lohur Interchange ( РБ09 , РҶ046 ) | 15.5 km |
| РҶ043 | Somoniyon (Rudaki) ( РҶ042 ) - Gharav ( РҶ052 ) - Yovon ( РҶ024 ) - Abdurahmoni Jomi ( РҶ051 ) - Uyali ( РБ09 ) | 107 km |
| РҶ044 | Chimteppa ( РБ09 ) - Hisor | 20 km |
| РҶ045 | Lohur ( РҶ046 ) - Esanboy - Shurtughay | 76.5 km |
| РҶ046 | Lohur Interchange ( РБ09 , РҶ046 ) - Lohur ( РҶ045 ) | 2.5 km |
| РҶ047 | Dusti ( РБ04 ) - Norak Hydro Electric Plant | 9.9 km |
| РҶ048 | Dushanbe - Hisor | 16.1 km |
| РҶ049 | Rossiya Kolkhoz (Abdulahad Kahharov St.) - Guliston Kolkhoz ( РБ04 ) (Shohmansur District, Dushanbe) | 10.5 km |
| РҶ050 | Uljaboy Factory (Dushanbe) ( РБ04 ) - Okhtok - Qiblai - Rudaki St. (Dushanbe) ( РБ01 ) | 23.9 km |
| РҶ051 | Abdurahmoni Jomi ( РҶ043 ) - Yakkatut - Qizilqala ( РБ09 ) | 13.5 km |
| РҶ052 | Gharav ( РҶ043 ) - Yovon Railway Station - Pioner Industrial Park (Tojikkimsanoat Factory) | 4.5 km |
| РҶ053 | Bokhtar Ring Road | 12.4 km |
| РҶ054 | Bokhtar - Vakhsh ( РҶ057 ) | 13.8 km |
| РҶ055 | РБ10 - Qurghonteppa Railway Station (Bokhtar) | 0.9 km |
| РҶ057 | Vakhsh ( РҶ054 ) - Dusti - Kaltashur ( РБ10 ) | 50.0 km |
| РҶ058 | Uzul ( РБ09 ) - Jilikul ( РҶ059 ) - Beshai Palangon Nature Reserve | 32.5 km |
| РҶ059 | Shuro ( РҶ058 ) - Qubodiyon ( РБ11 ) - 20-Solagii Istiqloliyati Tojikiston | 9.2 km |
| РҶ060 | Dusti ( РБ09 ) - Beshai Palangon Nature Reserve | 11.9 km |
| РҶ061 | Balk ( РБ09 ) - Pakhtaaral ( РҶ058 ) | 6.1 km |
| РҶ062 | Pakhtokur ( РБ09 ) - Numuna ( РҶ058 ) | 14.4 km |
| РҶ063 | Ruknobod ( РБ13 ) - Panjrud (Rudaki Mausoleum) | 17.0 km |
| РҶ064 | Istaravshan ( РБ01 ) - Ghonchi ( РҶ066 ) | 12.6 km |
| РҶ065 | РБ01 - Istaravshan - РБ01 | 11.0 km |
| РҶ066 | Dashtikon ( РБ01 ) - Ghonchi ( РҶ064 ) | 17.1 km |
| РҶ067 | Zafarobod ( РБ15 ) - Shirin - Border of Uzbekistan ( РҶ091 ) | 25.2 km |
| РҶ068 | Yova ( РБ01 ) - Khujand - Buston - Ghafurov ( РБ14 ) | 17.1 km |
| РҶ069 | Konibodom ( РБ14 ) - Nurafshon - Isfara | 27 km |
| РҶ070 | Konibodom ( РБ14 ) - Rabot - Border of Uzbekistan | 27 km |
| РҶ071 | Qahramon ( РБ19 , РҶ084 ) - Urmontol | 8.5 km |
| РҶ072 | Shohiyon ( РБ14 ) - Khujand | 7 km |
| РҶ073 | Ghafurov ( РБ14 ) - Ovchiqal'acha - Border of Kyrgyzstan | 13.6 km |
| РҶ074 | Kuloli ( РҶ063 ) - Ghazza - Kuhi | 25 km |
| РҶ075 | Ghafurov ( РБ14 ) - Khujand Airport | 5.2 km |
| РҶ076 | Shamsobod ( РБ19 ) - Adrasmon | 68 km |
| РҶ077 | Spitamen District ( РБ01 ) - Border of Uzbekistan (Bekobod) | 6.8 km |
| РҶ078 | Isfara ( РҶ069 ) - Shurob - Border of Kyrgyzstan | 7 km |
| РҶ079 | Dehmoy ( РБ14 ) - Mehrobod ( РБ12 ) | 6 km |
| РҶ080 | РБ15 - Yakkatol | 1.2 km |
| РҶ081 | Shirin ( РҶ067 ) - Hashtyak | 12.1 km |
| РҶ082 | Konibodom ( РБ14 ) - Konibodom Railway Station ( РҶ083 ) | 7.1 km |
| РҶ083 | Konibodom Railway Station ( РҶ082 ) - Konibodom Resort (Tajik Sea (Kayrakkum) Shore) | 4 km |
| РҶ084 | Qahramon ( РБ19 , РҶ084 ) - Shaydon | 11.3 km |
| РҶ085 | Rushon ( РБ04 ) - Basid - Ghudara | 150 km |
| РҶ086 | Maykhura ( РБ01 ) - Kalon - Anzob - Takfon | 62 km |
| РҶ087 | Levakant ( РБ10 ) - Sangtuda 2 Hydroelectric Power Plant | 18 km |
| РҶ088 | Balkh ( РБ09 ) - Orzu - Vakhsh | 41.6 km |
| РҶ089 | Qadiob ( РБ07 ) - Roghun | 10.75 km |
| РҶ090 | Khujand - Palos - РБ19 | 16.6 km |
| РҶ091 | Kurush - Shirin - Border of Uzbekistan ( РҶ067 ) | 11.8 km |
| РҶ092 | Khur ( РБ03 ) - Miyonadu | 36 km |
| РҶ093 | ( РБ07 ) - Fayzobod Centre | 1.7 km |
| РҶ095 | Khovaling ( РҶ026 , РҶ032 ) - Siyofark - Shugnov | 63.0 km |
| РҶ097 | Zardolu ( РБ04 ) - Chormaghzak ( РҶ023 , РҶ024 ) - Nayzirak | 24.4 km |
| РҶ098 | Bokhtar Main Road; Bahor District ( РБ01 ) - Hoji Sharif Market ( РБ10 ) | 4.9 km |

== Asian Highways ==
Several of the highway of the Asian Highway Network cross Tajikistan. These include the following:

- AH7
  - РБ15 РБ15 Road: Khavast - Zarafshon - Istaravshan
  - РБ01 РБ01 Road : Istaravshan - Dushanbe
  - РБ09 РБ09 Road : Dushanbe - Qizilqala - Bokhtar - Panji Poyon
- AH65
  - РБ07 РБ07 Road : Karamyk - Vahdat
  - РБ04 РБ04 Road : Vahdat - Dushanbe - Tursunzada
  - РБ02 РБ02 Road : Dushanbe - Tursunzada
- AH66
  - РБ04 Kulma Pass - Murghab - Khorugh - Kalaikhumb - Vahdat - Dushanbe

== E-Roads ==
Several of the highway of the International E-road network cross Tajikistan. These include the following:

- E60
  - РБ02 РБ02 Road: Tursunzoda - Dushanbe (E123)
  - РБ04 РБ04 Road: Dushanbe - Vahdat
  - РБ07 РБ07 Road: Vahdat - Obi Garm - Vahdat (Jirgatol)
- E123
- РБ15 РБ15 Road: Border of Uzbekistan - Zarafshon - Istaravshan
- РБ01 РБ01 Road: Istaravshan - Spitamen - Ayni - Dushanbe
- РБ09 РБ09 Road: Dushanbe - Qizilqala - Bokhtar - Panji Poyon
- E006
  - РБ01 РБ01 Road: Ayni (E 123) - Dehmoy - Khujand
  - РБ14 РБ14 Road: Dehmoy - Ghafurov - Konibodom - Border of Uzbekistan
- E008
  - РБ04 РБ04 Road: Dushanbe - Vahdat - Kulob - Khorugh - Murghob - Kulma - Border of China
- E009
  - РБ07 РБ07 Road: Vahdat (Jirgatol) - Gharm (Rasht) - Labi Jar
  - РБ03 РБ03 Road: Labi Jar - Qal'ai Khumb
  - РБ04 РБ04 Road: Qal'ai Khumb - Khorugh
  - РБ06 РБ06 Road: Khorugh - Ishkoshim - Langar - Border of Afghanistan

== See also ==
- Full list in Russian (2009), UNECE, https://unece.org/fileadmin/DAM/hlm/prgm/cph/experts/tajikistan/Documents/draft.stateprogram.transport.devt.2010.2025.ru.pdf (Archive)
- 2011 law, and list of "International roads" http://bamap.org/information/news/2011/08/01/15115/print/
- List of Roads of national importance of the Soviet Union from 1982 (in Russian) Link (Archive)

== See also ==
- Roads in Armenia
- Roads in Azerbaijan
- Roads in Georgia (country)
- Roads in Kazakhstan
- Roads in Kyrgyzstan
- Roads in Uzbekistan
