= Tursunzoda District =

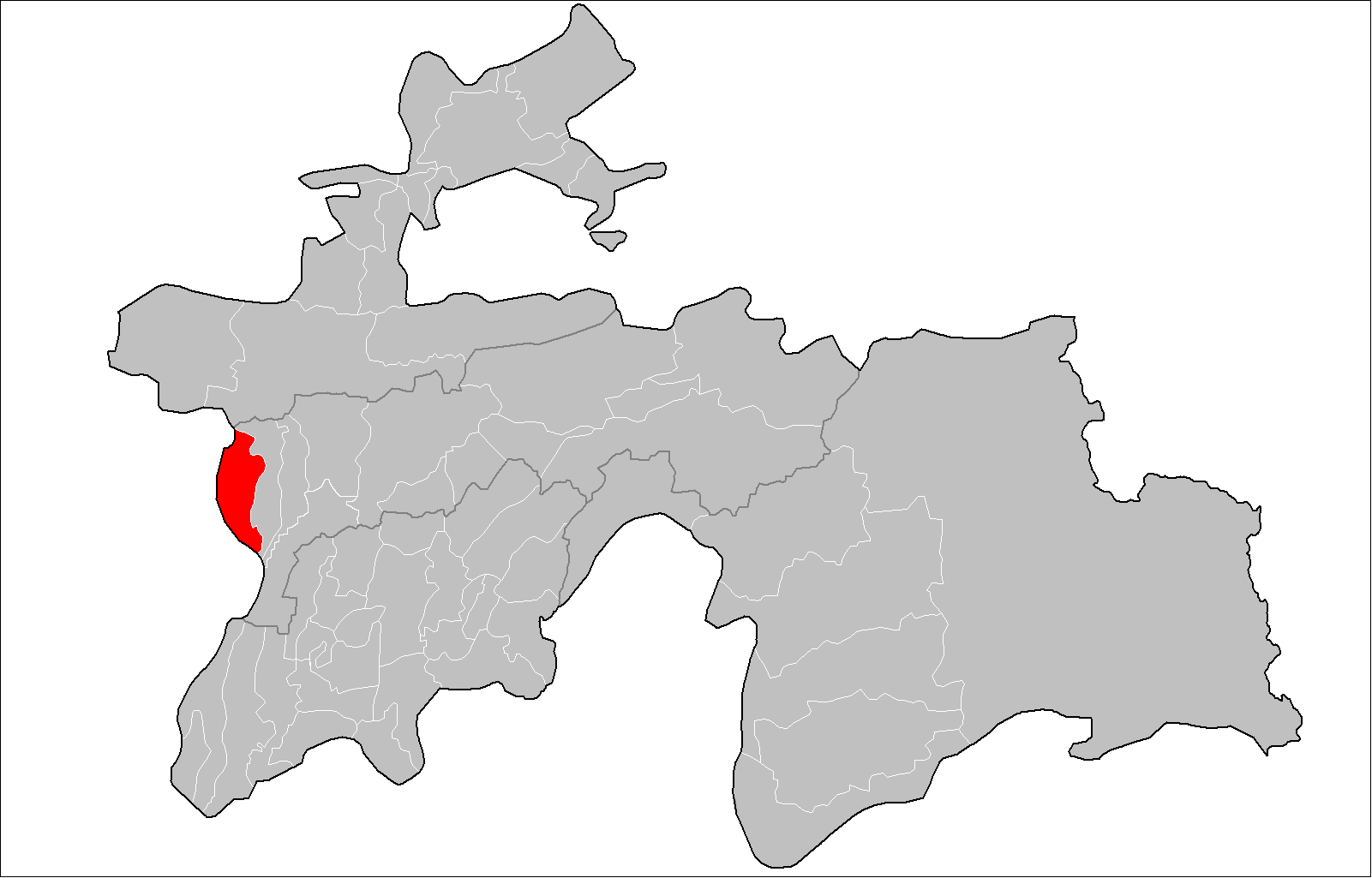
Location in Tajikistan

Tursunzoda District (Tajik: Турсунзода, Russian spelling: Tursunzade) is the westernmost district of the Districts of Republican Subordination (RRP), bordering on Uzbekistan in the west and enclosed by Tajikistan's Shahrinav District from the other directions. Its capital is Tursunzoda, called Regar, or "a town on sand", until 1978. Thanks to its warm weather and plentiful irrigation from the local rivers (Shirkent, Karatag, Kofarnihon), Tursunzoda District is a major grower of rice and cotton in Tajikistan. In 2006 it produced 1,400 tons of rice (13% of Tajikistan's rice harvest) and 7,300 tons of cotton (3% of Tajikistan's cotton harvest). It ranks first in the production of these commodities among the districts in RRP. Around 2018, the district was merged into the city of Tursunzoda.

== Administrative divisions ==
The district was divided administratively into jamoats. They were as follows (and population).

Jamoats of Tursunzoda District
Jamoat	Population
Garav	13795
Jura Rahmonov	
Navobod	26215
Pakhtaobod	6552
Pervomay	14879
Qaratoq	27683
Rabot	9643
Seshanbe	10510
Solagii Istiqlol	
