= Mirzo Tursunzoda (disambiguation) =

Mirzo Tursunzoda was a Tajikistani poet.

Mirzo Tursunzoda may also refer to several places in Tajikistan, named after the poet:

- Tursunzoda, a city in western Tajikistan
- Tursunzoda District, a former district in western Tajikistan
- Mirzo Tursunzoda, Hisor, part of the city Hisor
- Mirzo Tursunzoda, Rudaki District, a town in Rudaki District
- Mirzo Tursunzoda, Shahrinav District, a town in Shahrinav District
- Tursunzoda, Shahriston District, a village in Shahriston District
