= Chashma, Tajikistan =

Chashma
- Location in Tajikistan
- Coordinates: 38°25′N 68°17′E
- Country: Tajikistan
- Region: Districts of Republican Subordination
- City: Tursunzoda

Chashma (Tajik: Чашма, formerly: Kuchkan) is a village in western Tajikistan. It is part of the jamoat Jura Rahmonov in the city of Tursunzoda.
