= Hakimi, Tajikistan =

Hakimi Ҳакимӣ
- Village and Jamoat
- Location within Tajikistan
- Coordinates: 38°49′N 69°51′E
- Country: Tajikistan
- Region: Districts of Republican Subordination
- District: Nurobod District

Population (2015)
  - Total: 13,666
- Time zone: UTC+5 (TJT)

Hakimi (Tajik: Ҳакимӣ, Persian: حکیمی) is a village and jamoat in Tajikistan. It is located in Nurobod District, one of the Districts of Republican Subordination. The jamoat has a total population of 13,666 (2015).

== Villages ==
- Aligalabon
- Darai Tag
- Dukak Kaskon
- Kofara
- Khumrogh
- Layron
- Maydoni Seb
- Obi Boriki Bolo

- Obi Boriki Poyon
- Sadoqat
- Sarizakob
- Saripulak
- Safedoron
- Siyohgulak
- Tagi Kamar
- Chorsada

- Shohtuti Bolo
- Shohtuti Poyon
- Hakimii Bolo
- Hakimii Poyon
- Hakimii Miyona
- Hasandara
- Javchii Bolo
- Javchii Poyon
