= Zideh, Tajikistan =

Zideh
- Jamoat
- Location within Tajikistan
- Coordinates: 39°03′N 68°50′E
- Country: Tajikistan
- Region: Districts of Republican Subordination
- District: Varzob District

Population (2015)
  - Total: 7,219
- Time zone: UTC+5 (TJT)
- Official languages: Russian (Interethnic); Tajik (State)

Zideh (Russian: Зидди; Tajik: Зидеҳ, also: Ziddi) is a jamoat in Tajikistan. It is located in Varzob District, one of the Districts of Republican Subordination. The jamoat has a total population of 7,219 (2015). It consists of 7 villages: Kalon (the seat), Hazora, Kukteppa, Namozgoh, Nasrud, Obi Khirf, Panjkhok.
