= Navobod, Rudaki District =

Navobod Russian: Навабадский Tajik: Навобод
- Town
- Location within Tajikistan
- Coordinates: 38°31′40″N 68°40′30″E
- Country: Tajikistan
- Region: Districts of Republican Subordination
- District: Rudaki District

Population (2020)
  - Total: 10,200
- Time zone: UTC+5 (TJT)

Navobod (Russian: Навабадский; Tajik: Навобод) is a town in Tajikistan. It is located in Rudaki District, one of the Districts of Republican Subordination. The population of the town is 10,200 (January 2020 estimate). The town lies west of the capital Dushanbe.
