= Gulrukhsor Safieva =

Tajikistani writer (born 1947)

- Born: 17 December 1947 (age 78); Nurobod District, Dushanbe, Tajik SSR, USSR
- Other names: Golrokhsar Safi Eva, Golrokhsar Safi-Eva
- Education: Tajik National University
- Occupations: Writer, poet
- Employer: Pioneer of Tajikistan
- Organization: Union of Soviet Writers
- Political party: Communist Party of the Soviet Union (CPSU)
- Awards: Lenin Komsomol Prize

Gulrukhsor Safieva (Tajik: Гулрухсор Сафиева; گلرخسار صفی‌اوا) (born 17 December 1947) is a Tajik Iranologist, Persian literary figure and poet. She is known for her contribution to Iranistics, modern Persian poetry and Persian folk songs. She is highly regarded throughout Iranian cultural continent and is known as "the mother of the Tajik nation."

== Biography ==
Safieva was born on 17 December 1947 in Nurobod District, Dushanbe, Tajik Soviet Socialist Republic, USSR. She was orphaned at an early age and was raised as a Muslim in orphanages.

Safieva was educated at a boarding school in Mehrobod and graduated from studying language and literature at the Tajik National University in Dushanbe in 1968. She was a member of the Communist Party of the Soviet Union (Russian: Коммунистическая партия Советского Союза, CPSU) from 1968 to 1991.

Safieva worked as a journalist and poet. She published her first poems in the local newspaper Karategini Soveta in 1962. In 1973, Safieva's work Khonai Padar (Father's house) won the Literary Tajik Youth Prize. Her poetry used the literary devices of similes, metaphors, puns, and īhām (ambiguity).

In the late 1970s, Safieva was editor-in-chief of the newspaper Pioneer of Tajikistan.

From 1981 to 1986, Safieva was the Secretary of the Board of the Writers' Union of Tajikistan. She was a member of the Soviet Committee on Links with Writers of Asian and African Countries and the Union of Soviet Writers (Russian: Союз писателей СССР, romanized: Soyuz pisatelei SSSR). From 1989 to 1991 she chaired the Tajikistan branch of the USSR fund for culture.

During the Tajikstani Civil War (1992–1997), Safieva sympathized with the Islamists and became an activist of the opposition movement. She lived for five years in Moscow.

In 1996, Safieva was awarded the Lenin Komsomol Prize (Russian: премия Ленинского комсомола). In 1999, she was named a Peoples Poet of Tajikistan. Safieva is known as the "mother of the Tajik nation."

== Selected Publications ==
=== Poems ===
- Bunafsha (Violet), Dushanbe: Irfon, 1970.
- Khonai Padar (Father's house), Dushanbe: Irfon, 1973.
- Afsonai Kuhi (Mountain legend), Dushanbe: Ma‘orif, 1975.
- Ikhlos (Sincerity), Dushanbe: Ma‘orif, 1980.
- Otashi Sughd (The Sughd fire), Dushanbe: Irfon, 1981.
- Takhti Sangin (Stone throne), Dushanbe: Adib, 1992.
- Marzi Nomus (The boundary of honour), Sadoi Sharq 1–2, 1988.
- Devoni Gulrukhsor (Gulrukhsor's collection of poems), Du-shanbe, Payvand, 2006.

Safieva's poems have been translated into Russian by the poets Rimma Kazakova, Tatiana Alexandrovna Bek [ru] and Tatiana Vitalievna Kuzovleva [ru]. In 2010, a collection of Safieva's poetry was released in Iran.

=== Novels ===
- Zanoni Sabzbahor (The women of Sabzbahar), Dushanbe: Adib, 1989.
- Zan va Jang (Woman and war), Dushanbe: Matbu ‘ot, 2001.
- Sakarot (Agony), Dushanbe: Er-graf, 2009.

After publishing a study on the quatrains (Four-line poems or stanzas) of the Persian polymath and poet Omar Khayyam, in 2022 Safieva was appointed as a permanent member of the Iran's Academy of Persian Language and Literature (Persian: فرهنگستان زبان و ادب فارسی).

== See also ==
- Simin Behbahani

== Sources ==
- Chopra, R.M., "Eminent Poetesses of Persian", 2010, Iran Society, Kolkata.
