= Safedchashma =

- Jamoat
- Location within Tajikistan
- Coordinates: 38°55′N 70°03′E
- Country: Tajikistan
- Region: Districts of Republican Subordination
- District: Nurobod District

Population (2015)
  - Total: 8,015
- Time zone: UTC+5 (TJT)
- Official languages: Russian (Interethnic); Tajik (State) (Note: Constitution of Tajikistan)

Safedchashma (Tajik: Сафедчашма; Russian: Сафедчашма, formerly Samsolik) is a jamoat in Tajikistan. It is located in Nurobod District, one of the Districts of Republican Subordination. As of 2015, Safedchashma has a total population of 8,015.
