= Rohati =

- Village and Jamoat
- Location within Tajikistan
- Coordinates: 38°36′N 68°56′E
- Country: Tajikistan
- Region: Districts of Republican Subordination
- District: Rudaki District

Population (2015)
  - Total: 32,152
- Time zone: UTC+5 (TJT)
- Official languages: Russian (Interethnic); Tajik (State) (Note: Constitution of Tajikistan)

Rohati (Russian: Рохати; Tajik: Роҳатӣ) is a village and jamoat in Tajikistan. It is located in Rudaki District, one of the Districts of Republican Subordination. The jamoat had a total population of 32,152 in 2015.
