= Mujiharf =

- Village and Jamoat
- Location within Tajikistan
- Coordinates: 38°51′N 69°53′E
- Country: Tajikistan
- Region: Districts of Republican Subordination
- District: Nurobod District

Population (2015)
  - Total: 17,366
- Time zone: UTC+5 (TJT)

Mujiharf (Tajik: Муҷихарф Mujikharf, Persian: موج حرف) is a village and jamoat in Tajikistan. It is located in Nurobod District, one of the Districts of Republican Subordination. The jamoat has a total population of 17,366 (2015).
