= Sabo, Tajikistan =

Sabo
- Jamoat
- Country: Tajikistan
- Region: Districts of Republican Subordination
- District: Shahrinav District

Population (2015)
  - Total: 17,557
- Time zone: UTC+5 (TJT)
- Official languages: Russian (Interethnic); Tajik (State) (Note: Constitution of Tajikistan)

Sabo (Russian and Tajik: Сабо, Persian: صبا) is a jamoat in Tajikistan. It is located in Shahrinav District, one of the Districts of Republican Subordination. The jamoat has a total population of 17,557 (2015).
