= Kanyshbek =

- Location in Tajikistan
- Coordinates: 39°08′49″N 71°03′55″E
- Country: Tajikistan
- Region: Districts of Republican Subordination
- District: Tojikobod District

Kanyshbek (Tajik: Канышбек) is a village in central Tajikistan. It is part of the jamoat Nushor in Tojikobod District, one of the Districts of Republican Subordination. It lies on the river Surkhob.
