= Hazora =

- Location in Tajikistan
- Coordinates: 39°2′44″N 68°52′22″E
- Country: Tajikistan
- Region: Districts of Republican Subordination
- District: Varzob District

Population (2017)
  - Total: 839

Hazora (Tajik: Ҳазора) is a village in Tajikistan. It is part of the jamoat Zideh in Varzob District, one of the Districts of Republican Subordination.
