= Sultonobod =

- Village and Jamoat
- Location within Tajikistan
- Coordinates: 38°27′N 68°57′E
- Country: Tajikistan
- Region: Districts of Republican Subordination
- District: Rudaki District

Population (2015)
  - Total: 16,066
- Time zone: UTC+5 (TJT)
- Official languages: Russian (Interethnic); Tajik (State)

Sultonobod (Tajik: Султонобод) or Sultanabad (Russian: Султанабад) is a village and jamoat in Tajikistan. It is located in Rudaki District, one of the Districts of Republican Subordination. The jamoat has a total population of 16,066 (2015).
