= Mirzo Tursunzoda, Rudaki District =

Mirzo Tursunzoda
- Town and Jamoat
- Location within Tajikistan
- Coordinates: 38°29′20″N 68°47′10″E
- Country: Tajikistan
- Region: Districts of Republican Subordination
- District: Rudaki District

Population (2020)
  - Total: 20,500
- Time zone: UTC+5 (TJT)

Mirzo Tursunzoda (Tajik: Мирзо Турсунзода) is a town and jamoat in Tajikistan. It is located in Rudaki District, one of the Districts of Republican Subordination. The population of the town is 20,500 (January 2020 estimate). The town lies south of the capital Dushanbe and north of the district seat Somoniyon. It consists of the villages Istiqlol, Korgar, Mavji, Hojiyon, Kosibon, Turdiev and Rumi.
