= Tursun =

Tursun may refer to

- Tursun (name)
- Tursun Uljaboev, a municipality in Tajikistan
- Tursun Tuychiev, a municipality in Tajikistan
