= Rossiya, Tajikistan =

Rossiya Россия (Russian and Tajik)
- Jamoat
- Location within Tajikistan
- Coordinates: 38°32′N 68°49′E
- Country: Tajikistan
- Region: Districts of Republican Subordination
- District: Rudaki District

Population (2015)
  - Total: 31,030
- Time zone: UTC+5 (TJT)
- Official languages: Russian (Interethnic); Tajik (State)

Rossiya (Russian and Tajik: Россия, also Kolkhozi Rossiya; formerly: Qushteppa) is a jamoat in Tajikistan. It is located in Rudaki District, one of the Districts of Republican Subordination. The jamoat has a total population of 31,030 (2015).
