= Khumdon =

Khumdon Хумдон
- Village and Jamoat
- Location within Tajikistan
- Coordinates: 38°54′N 70°08′E
- Country: Tajikistan
- Region: Districts of Republican Subordination
- District: Nurobod District
- Elevation: 1,355 m (4,446 ft)
- Time zone: UTC+5 (TJT)

Khumdon (Tajik: Хумдон, Russian: Хумдон; formerly Navdonak) is a village and jamoat in central Tajikistan. It is located in Nurobod District, one of the Districts of Republican Subordination.

== Geography ==
Khumdon is east of Dushanbe on the Pamir Highway, in the Vakhsh River valley and has a Köppen climate classification of Dsa and experiences wet and cold winters with dry cool summers. The town is both a river crossing and highway junction.

== History ==
During the 1920s the area was a hotbed for the Basmachi, the anti-Soviet resistance in Central Asia.

During the Civil War in Tajikistan from 1992 to 1997, the area was a hotbed for Islamist forces, and October 2010, the Tajik Interior Ministry asserted it had killed three militants nearby at Gharm amid an alleged rise in Islamic militancy in the region.
