= Hasanov (town) =

- Jamoat
- Location within Tajikistan
- Coordinates: 38°28′N 68°25′E
- Country: Tajikistan
- Region: Districts of Republican Subordination
- District: Shahrinav District

Population (2015)
  - Total: 26,990
- Time zone: UTC+5 (TJT)

Hasanov (Tajik: Ҳасанов, Persian: حسنف) is a jamoat in Tajikistan. It is located in Shahrinav District, one of the Districts of Republican Subordination. The jamoat has a total population of 26,990 (2015).
