= Zainabobod =

Zainabobod Tajik: Зайнабобод
- Jamoat
- Location within Tajikistan
- Coordinates: 38°30′30″N 68°50′00″E
- Country: Tajikistan
- Region: Districts of Republican Subordination
- District: Rudaki District

Population (2015)
  - Total: 36,844
- Time zone: UTC+5 (TJT)
- Official languages: Russian (Interethnic); Tajik (State) (Note: Constitution of Tajikistan)

Zainabobod (Russian: Зайнабобад; Tajik: Зайнабобод) is a jamoat in Tajikistan. It is located in Rudaki District, one of the Districts of Republican Subordination. The jamoat has a total population of 36,844 (2015).
