= Choryakkoron =

- Village and Jamoat
- Location within Tajikistan
- Country: Tajikistan
- Region: Districts of Republican Subordination
- District: Rudaki District

Population
  - Total: 14,496
- Time zone: UTC+5 (TJT)

Choryakkoron (Tajik: Чоряккорон, formerly: Ispechak) is a village and jamoat in Tajikistan. It is located in Rudaki District, one of the Districts of Republican Subordination. The jamoat has a total population of 14496.
