= Boghiston =

- Village and Jamoat
- Country: Tajikistan
- Region: Districts of Republican Subordination
- District: Shahrinav District

Population (2015)
  - Total: 9,331
- Time zone: UTC+5 (TJT)

Boghiston (Tajik: Боғистон, Persian: باغستان) is a village and jamoat in Tajikistan. It is located in Shahrinav District, one of the Districts of Republican Subordination. The jamoat has a total population of 9,331 (2015).
