= Nushor =

- Village and Jamoat
- Location within Tajikistan
- Coordinates: 39°08′N 70°55′E
- Country: Tajikistan
- Region: Districts of Republican Subordination
- District: Tojikobod District

Population (2015)
  - Total: 11,608
- Time zone: UTC+5 (TJT)
- Official languages: Russian (Interethnic); Tajik (State) (Note: Constitution of Tajikistan)

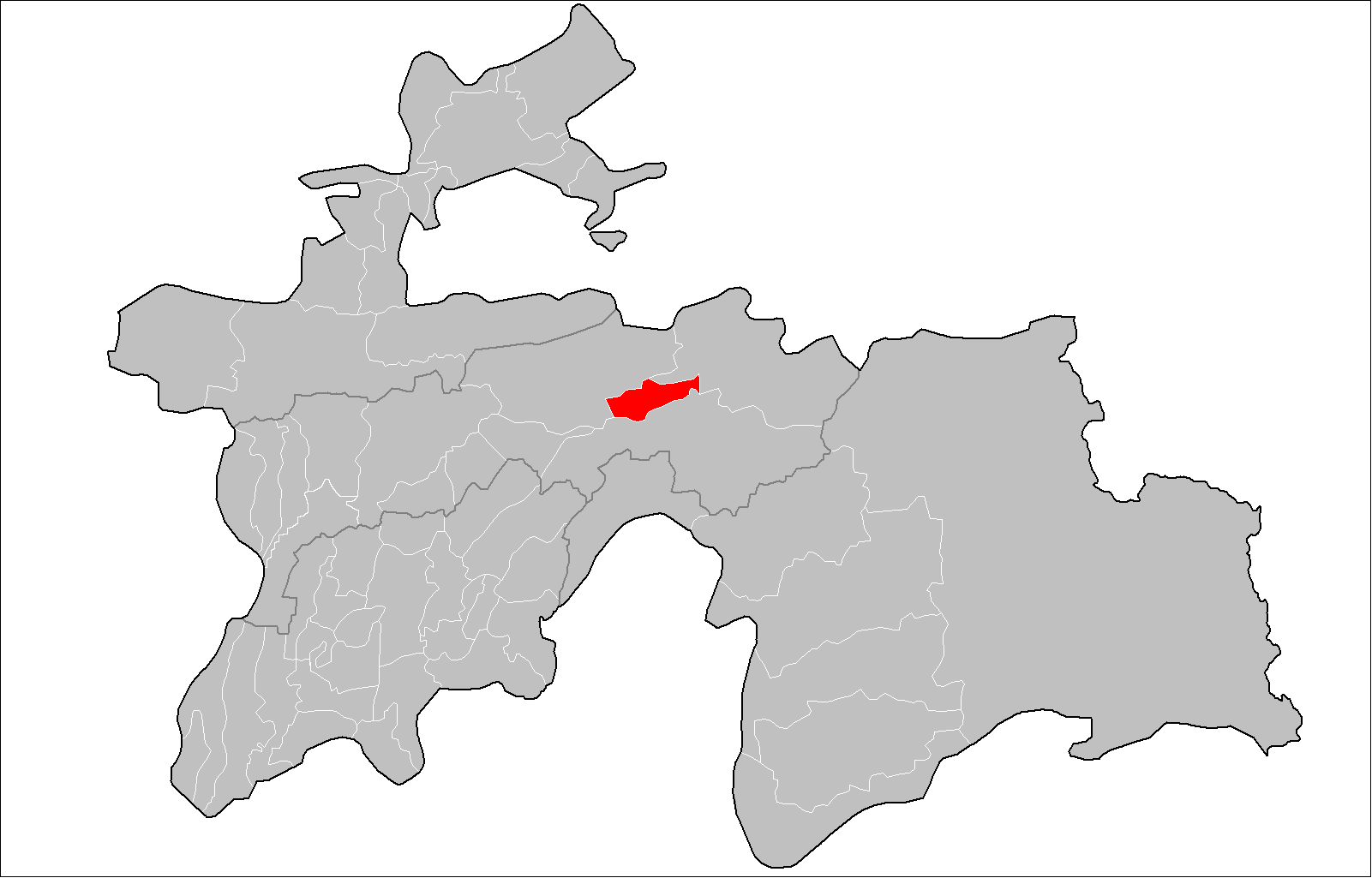
Location of Tojikobod District in Tajikistan

Nushor (Russian and Tajik: Нушор, Persian: نوشار) is a village and jamoat in Tajikistan. It is located in Tojikobod District, one of the Districts of Republican Subordination. The jamoat has a total population of 11,608 (2015). It consists of 14 villages, including Kanyshbek.
