= Esanboy =

- Village and Jamoat
- Location within Tajikistan
- Coordinates: 38°05′N 68°23′E
- Country: Tajikistan
- Region: Districts of Republican Subordination
- District: Rudaki District

Population (2015)
  - Total: 20,072
- Time zone: UTC+5 (TJT)
- Official languages: Russian (Interethnic); Tajik (State)

Esanboy (Russian and Tajik: Эсанбой, formerly: Sardorov Karakhan) is a village and jamoat in Tajikistan. It is located in Rudaki District, one of the Districts of Republican Subordination. According to the 2015 jamoat-level indicatiors published by the United Nations Development Programme, The jamoat had a total population of 20,072.
