= Sarikishti =

- Village and Jamoat
- Location within Tajikistan
- Coordinates: 38°28′N 68°42′E
- Country: Tajikistan
- Region: Districts of Republican Subordination
- District: Rudaki District

Population (2015)
  - Total: 38,474
- Time zone: UTC+5 (TJT)
- Official languages: Russian (Interethnic); Tajik (State) (Note: Constitution of Tajikistan)

Sarikishti (Russian: Сарикишти; Tajik: Сарикиштӣ, formerly: 40-Solagii Tojikiston) is a village and jamoat in Tajikistan. It is located in Rudaki District, one of the Districts of Republican Subordination. The jamoat has a total population of 38,474 (2015).
