= Khalimakhon Suleymanova =

Tajik collective farmer (1907–1993)

- Халимахон Сулаймонова
- Born: 30 June 1907; Emirate of Bukhara
- Died: 1993 (aged 85–86)
- Awards: Hero of Socialist Labour; Order of Lenin (2); Order of the Red Banner of Labour (2)

Khalimakhon Suleymanova (Russian: Халимахон Сулейманова, Tajik: Халимахон Сулаймонова; 30 June 1907 – 1993) was a Soviet Tajik collective farmer known for the development of innovative methods in cotton farming. The most productive cotton farmer in the Tajik SSR in 1946, she started her own technical school where she would teach her techniques in agricultural science, with one of her students outproducing her the following year.

== Biography ==
Khalimakhon Suleymanova was born on 30 June 1907 in the Emirate of Bukhara in modern Tajikistan. She was an ethnic Tajik. During the Soviet era, she became a team leader at the Kaganovich collective farm in the Koktash district (Somoniyon) in the Stalinabad region (Rudaki district), where she produced cotton. She worked under the directorship of Rakhmankul Dzhabarov and was well-regarded by the local elders.

During World War II, Suleymanova gave several speeches to other collective farmers, stating in one: "The joint struggle of the two great powers – the USSR and Great Britain – will hasten the defeat of the fascists and liberate the peoples of Europe from the Hitlerite yoke. We must work with even greater energy in the rear and devote all our strength to the homeland". In another speech, she stated: "we must mobilize more of our energy for the front". Suleymanova was very productive during this period, being able to harvest 100 centners of cotton per hectare. For her efforts during the war, she was awarded the Order of the Red Banner of Labour on 3 January 1944.

In 1946, Suleymanova became the most productive cotton farmer in the entire Tajik SSR, achieving a record harvest of 113 centners per hectare over 5 hectares. For this, she was awarded a second Order of the Red Banner of Labour on 29 December 1946. On 19 March 1947, she was named Hero of Socialist Labour and awarded the Order of Lenin for obtaining high harvests. Suleymanova also led a technical school where she taught other farmers how to apply her techniques in agricultural science.

Suleymanova's techniques are recorded through her student Kumrikhon Abdurakhimova, who surpassed her record yield in 1947. First the fields were plowed in late autumn, with 18 tons of fertilizer and 300 kilograms of superphosphate applied per hectare. The irrigation networks were then cleared of silt and the fields de-weeded prior to sowing. The cotton plants were initially cut no later than the day after re-plowing in the spring; because her practice called for early hoeing and watering periods, the seeds from the cut plants would fall into the freshly loosened and moistened soil which resulted in healthier cotton shoots. This would be followed by a deep hoeing five days after the shoots emerge, with at least six additional hoeing periods. The soil was also frequently loosened by tractors and horse-drawn cultivators, and watering periods occurred a further five times. Shoots were then thinned in a single stage rather than the typical multi-stage process followed by an immediate watering. The plants would then be fertilized twice: once with saltpeter when the plants begin budding and once with saltpeter and manure when the plants begin flowering. Bollworm and cotton aphid infestations – which typically occurred in midsummer – would be treated manually. In late July, the cotton would be stamped, accelerating the ripening process and increasing yield. The first batch was harvested by the end of August.

For their success, Suleymanova's unit was rewarded with "more wheat, textiles, butter, and tea than the entire village bought during the damned Emir's time". The Soviet magazine Smena held her as an example of the success of Bolshevism, stating that such an innovative woman would have been impossible during the emirate when women were disenfranchised and enslaved. For teaching her innovative techniques, Suleymanova was awarded a second Order of Lenin on 2 June 1948. Little is known about her life after this. She died in 1993.
