= Kalon =

Kalon Калон
- Location in Tajikistan
- Coordinates: 39°2′48″N 68°49′59″E
- Country: Tajikistan
- Region: Districts of Republican Subordination
- District: Varzob District

Kalon (Tajik: Калон) is a village in Tajikistan. It is located in Varzob District, one of the Districts of Republican Subordination. It is the seat of the jamoat Zideh. It is located along the old M34 highway.
