= Seshanbe =

- Village and Jamoat
- Location within Tajikistan
- Coordinates: 38°32′N 68°15′E
- Country: Tajikistan
- Region: Districts of Republican Subordination
- City: Tursunzoda

Population (2015)
  - Total: 15,197
- Time zone: UTC+5 (TJT)
- Official languages: Russian (Interethnic); Tajik (State) (Note: Constitution of Tajikistan)

Seshanbe (Russian and Tajik: Сешанбе, Persian: سه‌شنبه) is a village and jamoat in Tajikistan. It is part of the city of Tursunzoda in Districts of Republican Subordination. The jamoat has a total population of 15,197 (2015).
