= Shahrinav =

- Village and Jamoat
- Location within Tajikistan
- Coordinates: 38°34′N 68°20′E
- Country: Tajikistan
- Region: Districts of Republican Subordination
- District: Shahrinav District

Population (2015)
  - Total: 11,123
- Time zone: UTC+5 (TJT)
- Official languages: Russian (Interethnic); Tajik (State)

Shahrinav (Tajik: Шаҳринав, Russian: Шахринав) is a village and jamoat in Tajikistan. It is located in Shahrinav District, one of the Districts of Republican Subordination. It is the seat of the Shahrinav District. The jamoat has a total population of 11,123 (2015).
