= Izzatullo Halimov =

- Jamoat
- Location within Tajikistan
- Coordinates: 38°50′N 69°57′E
- Country: Tajikistan
- Region: Districts of Republican Subordination
- District: Nurobod District

Population (2015)
  - Total: 8,035
- Time zone: UTC+5 (TJT)

Izzatullo Halimov (Tajik: Иззатулло Ҳалимов, Russian: Иззатулло Халимов, formerly: Yakhak-Yust) is a jamoat in Tajikistan. It is located in Nurobod District, one of the Districts of Republican Subordination. The jamoat has a total population of 8,035 (2015).
