= 10-Solagii Istiqloliyat =

- Jamoat
- Location within Tajikistan Location within Asia
- Coordinates: 38°27′N 68°07′E
- Country: Tajikistan
- Region: Districts of Republican Subordination
- City: Tursunzoda

Population (2015)
  - Total: 29,492
- Time zone: UTC+5 (TJT)

10-Solagii Istiqloliyat (Tajik: 10-солагии Истиқлолият) is a jamoat in Tajikistan. It is part of the city of Tursunzoda in Districts of Republican Subordination. The jamoat has a total population of 29,492 (2015).
