= Chust, Tajikistan =

Chust
- Jamoat
- Location within Tajikistan
- Coordinates: 38°34′N 68°25′E
- Country: Tajikistan
- Region: Districts of Republican Subordination
- District: Shahrinav District

Population (2015)
  - Total: 17,135
- Time zone: UTC+5 (TJT)

Chust (Tajik: Чуст, formerly: Chuzi) is a jamoat in Tajikistan. It is located in Shahrinav District, one of the Districts of Republican Subordination. The jamoat has a total population of 17,135 (2015).
