= Shahrinav District =

Shahrinav District Russian: Шахринавский район Tajik: Ноҳияи Шаҳринав
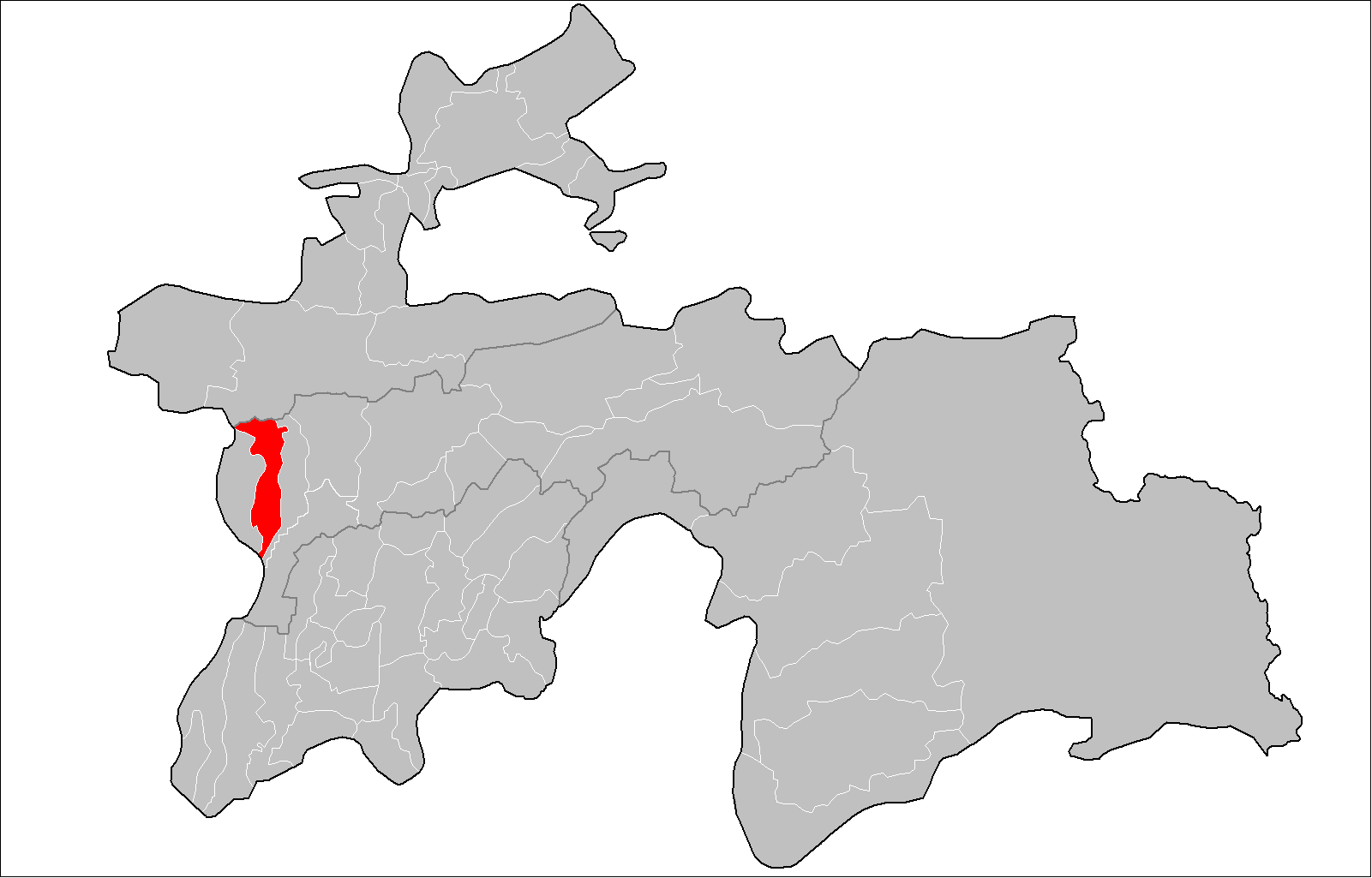
- Location of the district in Tajikistan
- Coordinates: 38°35′N 68°25′E
- Country: Tajikistan
- Region: Districts of Republican Subordination
- Capital: Shahrinav

Area
  - Total: 1,000 km^{2} (390 sq mi)

Population (2020)
  - Total: 123,000
  - Density: 120/km^{2} (320/sq mi)
- Time zone: UTC+5
- Official languages: Russian (Interethnic); Tajik (State)
- Website: shahrinav.tj

Shahrinav District (Tajik: Ноҳияи Шаҳринав Nohiyai Shahrinav; Russian spelling; Shakhrinav) is a district in Tajikistan, one of the Districts of Republican Subordination. It lies between Tajikistan's capital Dushanbe and Uzbekistan. The Shahrinav District borders on the city of Tursunzoda in the west, the city of Hisor in the east, and Rudaki District in the south. It is delimited by the Gissar Range in the north and is part of the fertile Gissar Valley. Its capital is Shahrinav, a village 30 km west of Dushanbe. The population of the district is 123,000 (January 2020 estimate).

== Administrative divisions ==
The district has an area of about 1,000 km^{2} (400 sq mi) and is divided administratively into one town and six jamoats. They are as follows:

Jamoat	Population (Jan. 2015)
Mirzo Tursunzoda (town)	6,900
Boghiston	9,331
Chust	17,135
Hasanov	26,990
Istiqlol	15,463
Sabo	17,557
Shahrinav	11,123
