= Mehrobod, Nurobod District =

Mehrobod Меҳробод
- Village and Jamoat
- Меҳробод
- Location within Tajikistan
- Coordinates: 38°54′N 69°59′E
- Country: Tajikistan
- Region: Districts of Republican Subordination
- District: Nurobod District

Population (2015)
  - Total: 15,046
- Time zone: UTC+5 (TJT)

Mehrobod (Tajik: Меҳробод, before 2021 Komsomolobod, formerly Pombachi) is a village and jamoat in Tajikistan. It is located in Nurobod District, one of the Districts of Republican Subordination. The jamoat has a total population of 15,046 (2015).
