= Regar, Tajikistan =

Regar
- Village and Jamoat
- Interactive map of Regar
- Country: Tajikistan
- Region: Districts of Republican Subordination
- City: Tursunzoda

Population (2015)
  - Total: 19,080
- Time zone: UTC+5 (TJT)
- Official languages: Russian (Interethnic); Tajik (State) (Note: Constitution of Tajikistan)

Regar (Russian and Tajik: Регар, formerly Garav) is a village and jamoat in Tajikistan. It is part of the city of Tursunzoda in Districts of Republican Subordination. The jamoat has a total population of 19,080 (2015).
