= Guliston, Rudaki District =

Guliston
- Village and Jamoat
- Location within Tajikistan
- Coordinates: 38°32′N 68°52′E
- Country: Tajikistan
- Region: Districts of Republican Subordination
- District: Rudaki District

Population (2015)
  - Total: 41,130
- Time zone: UTC+5 (TJT)

Guliston (Persian: گلستان) is a village and jamoat in Tajikistan. It is located in Rudaki District, one of the Districts of Republican Subordination. The jamoat has a total population of 41,130 (2015).

== Etymology ==
The name Gulistan and variations of that name is a common geographic place name in the Persian speaking world and means rose Garden.
