= Lohur, Rudaki District =

Lohur
- Village and Jamoat
- Location within Tajikistan
- Coordinates: 38°23′N 68°42′E
- Country: Tajikistan
- Province: Districts of Republican Subordination
- District: Rudaki District

Population (2015)
  - Total: 20,047
- Time zone: UTC+5 (TJT)

Lohur (Tajik: Лоҳур) is a village and jamoat in Tajikistan. It is located in Rudaki District, one of the Districts of Republican Subordination. The jamoat has a total population of 20,047 (2015).
