= Chimteppa =

Village and jamoat in Tajikistan

- Village and Jamoat
- Location within Tajikistan
- Coordinates: 38°28′N 68°44′E
- Country: Tajikistan
- Region: Districts of Republican Subordination
- District: Rudaki District

Population (2015)
  - Total: 45,221
- Time zone: UTC+5 (TJT)

Chimteppa (Tajik: Чимтеппа, formerly: Oqkurgan) is a village and jamoat in Tajikistan. It is located in Rudaki District, one of the Districts of Republican Subordination. The jamoat has a total population of 45,221 (2015).
