= Pakhtaobod =

- Village and Jamoat
- Location within Tajikistan
- Coordinates: 38°28′N 68°08′E
- Country: Tajikistan
- Region: Districts of Republican Subordination
- City: Tursunzoda

Population (2015)
  - Total: 9,690
- Time zone: UTC+5 (TJT)
- Official languages: Russian (Interethnic); Tajik (State) (Note: Constitution of Tajikistan)

Pakhtaobod (Russian: Пахтаобад; Tajik: Пахтаобод, Persian: پخته‌آباد) is a village and jamoat in Tajikistan. It is part of the city of Tursunzoda in Districts of Republican Subordination. The jamoat has a total population of 9,690 (2015).
