= Shahritus District =

Shahritus District Russian: Шахритусский район Tajik: Ноҳияи Шаҳритӯс
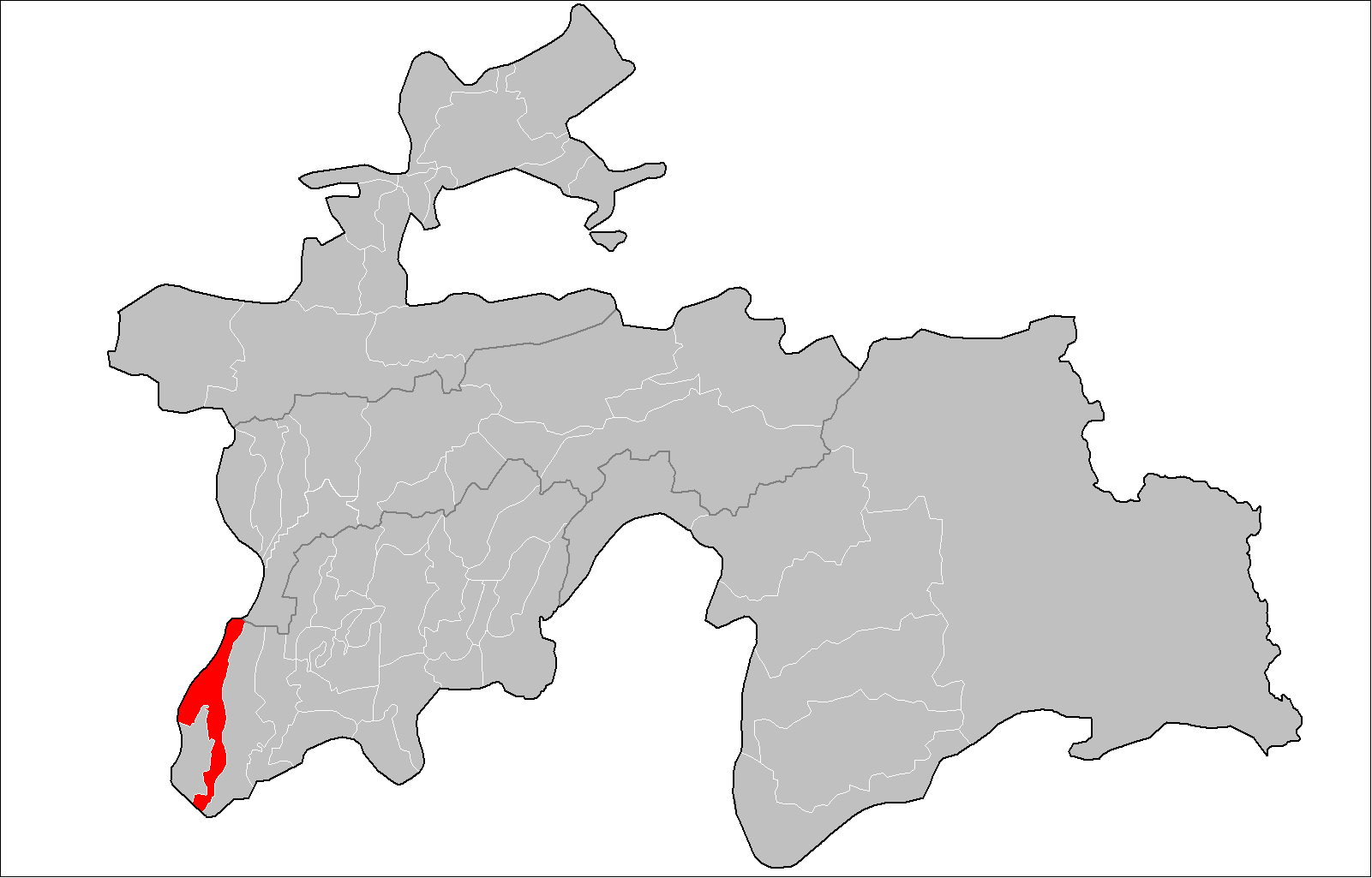
- Location of the district in Tajikistan
- Coordinates: 37°19′N 68°06′E
- Country: Tajikistan
- Region: Khatlon Region
- Capital: Shahritus

Area
  - Total: 1,500 km^{2} (580 sq mi)

Population (2020)
  - Total: 130,000
  - Density: 87/km^{2} (220/sq mi)
- Time zone: UTC+5
- Official languages: Russian (Interethnic); Tajik (State)
- Website: shahrituz.tj

Shahritus District or Nohiya-i Shahritus (Tajik: Ноҳияи Шаҳритӯс) is a district in Khatlon Region, southwestern Tajikistan. Its capital is the town Shahrituz. The population of the district is 130,000 (January 2020 estimate).

== Administrative divisions ==
The district has an area of about 1,500 km^{2} (600 sq mi) and is divided administratively into one town and five jamoats. They are as follows:

Jamoat	Population (Jan. 2015)
Shahritus (town)	15,800
Kholmatov	31,654
Jura Nazarov	17,808
Obshoron	8,648
Pakhtaobod	21,270
Sayyod	15,858
