= Jura Rahmonov =

- Jamoat
- Location within Tajikistan
- Coordinates: 38°31′N 68°17′E
- Country: Tajikistan
- Region: Districts of Republican Subordination
- City: Tursunzoda

Population (2015)
  - Total: 33,405
- Time zone: UTC+5 (TJT)

Jura Rahmonov (Tajik: Ҷӯра Раҳмонов, Persian: جوره رحمانف) is a jamoat in Tajikistan. It is part of the city of Tursunzoda in Districts of Republican Subordination. As of 2015, the jamoat has a total population of 33,405. It consists of 21 villages, including Chashma.
