= Yust =

Yust may refer to:

== People ==
- Ernest Yust (1927-1992), Soviet football player
- Walter Yust (1894–1960), American journalist and writer

== Places ==
- Yakhak-Yust, Tajikistan

== Other ==
- Yanbian University of Science and Technology
