= Tuychiev =

Tuychiev may refer to:

== People ==
- Alisher Tuychiev (born 1976), Tajikistani footballer
- Vladimir Tuychiev (born 1983), Uzbekistani cyclist
- Yalkin Tuychiev (born 1977), Uzbekistani filmmaker

== Other uses ==
- Tursun Tuychiev, jamoat in Tajikistan
