= List of regions of Tajikistan by Human Development Index =

This is a list of regions of the Republic of Tajikistan by Human Development Index as of 2025 with data for the year 2023.

Rank	Region	HDI (2023)
High human development
1	Dushanbe City	0.758
2	Kuhistani Badakhshan Autonomous Region	0.700
Medium Human development
3	Sughd Vilayat	0.695
–	Tajikistan	0.691
4	Districts under Central Government Jurisdiction	0.684
5	Khatlon Region	0.673

== See also ==
- List of countries by Human Development Index
