= Darband, Tajikistan =

Darband Дарбанд
- Town and Jamoat
- Location within Tajikistan
- Coordinates: 38°52′N 69°58′E
- Country: Tajikistan
- Region: Districts of Republican Subordination
- District: Nurobod District

Population (2020)
  - Total: 1,300
- Time zone: UTC+5 (TJT)

Darband (Tajik: Дарбанд, Russian: Дарбанд, before 1991: Russian: Комсомолабад, romanized: Komsomolabad or Tajik: Комсомолобод, romanized: Komsomolobod) is a town in Tajikistan. It is located in Nurobod District, one of the Districts of Republican Subordination. The population of the town is 1,300 (January 2020 estimate).
