= Navobod, Tursunzoda =

Navobod
- Jamoat
- Location within Tajikistan
- Coordinates: 38°31′N 68°08′E
- Country: Tajikistan
- Region: Districts of Republican Subordination
- City: Tursunzoda

Population (2015)
  - Total: 36,979
- Time zone: UTC+5 (TJT)

Navobod (Tajik: Навобод, Persian: نوآباد) is a jamoat in Tajikistan. It is part of the city of Tursunzoda in Districts of Republican Subordination. The jamoat has a total population of 36,979 (2015).
