= Chust =

Chust or CHUST may refer to:

- Chust culture, late Bronze Age and early Iron Age culture which flourished in the Fergana Valley of eastern Uzbekistan
- Chien Hsin University of Science and Technology, a university in Taoyuan County, Taiwan
- Chust (Hasidic dynasty), the name of several Hasidic dynasties
- Chust District, Namangan Region, Uzbekistan
  - Chust, Uzbekistan, the capital of Chust District
  - Chust knives, made in the Namangan Region
- Chust, Tajikistan, a village in Shahrinav District, Tajikistan
- Chust bug or Pentatomoidea, a superfamily of insects
- German, Czech, Slovak and Polish spelling of Khust, city in Ukraine
