= Tojikiston (disambiguation) =

Tojikiston is the Tajik and Uzbek word for Tajikistan, a country in Central Asia.

Tojikiston may also refer to:

- Tojikiston, Baljuvon District, a town and jamoat within Baljuvon District within Khatlon Province
- Tojikiston, Rudaki District, a town and jamoat within Rudaki District within the Districts of Republican Subordination
