= Somoniyon =

Somoniyon Сомониён
- Location in Tajikistan
- Coordinates: 38°26′32″N 68°46′37″E
- Country: Tajikistan
- Region: Districts of Republican Subordination
- District: Rudaki District

Population (January 2020)
  - Total: 25,200

Somoniyon (Tajik: Сомониён, Russian: сомониане) is a town in Tajikistan. It is the administrative capital of Rudaki District, one of the Districts of Republican Subordination, lying 17 km south of the national capital of Dushanbe and just east of the river Kofarnihon. The population of the town is 25,200 (January 2020 estimate).

During the Soviet era, the productive Kaganovich collective farm for cotton was located here, led by Rakhmankul Dzhabarov and Khalimakhon Suleymanova.

== Former names ==
The village was established in 1938 under the name of imeni Karakhon Sardorova (Russian: имени Карахон Сардорова, literally "village named after Karakhon Sardorov"), commemorating one of the prominent figures in the struggle for the Soviet rule against the Basmachi. In 1970, on the occasion of Lenin's 100th anniversary, it was renamed Lenin or Leninskiy. In 1998, it was renamed Somoniyon in honor of the 1100th anniversary of the Samanid Empire. Locals sometimes refer to the village by the historical name Kuktosh or Koktash (Uzbek for "blue stone").
