= List of railway stations in Tajikistan =

Railway stations in Tajikistan include:

The railroad system totals only 480 kilometers of track, all of it broad gauge. The system connects the main urban centers of western Tajikistan with points in neighboring Uzbekistan and Turkmenistan. In 2000 a new line connected the southern cities of Bokhtar and Kulob. Passenger transit through Tajikistan has been hindered by periodic failures of Tajik Railways to pay transit tariffs and by safety issues. Plans exist to link Tajikistan with Iran, Afghanistan, Kyrgyzstan and China with the Five Nations Railway Corridor.

== Stations served ==
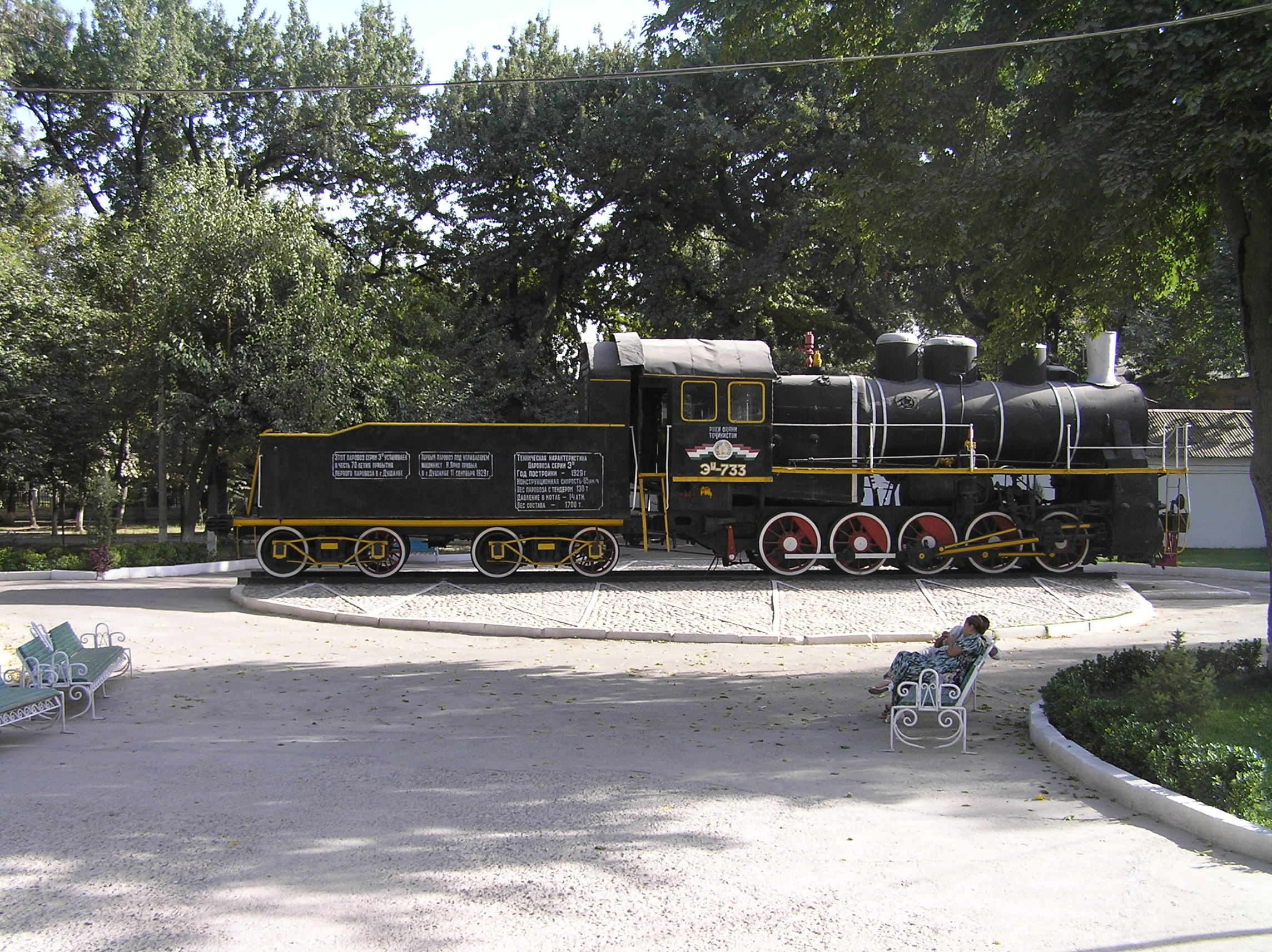
Eu 733 0-10-0 in a Park near the main railway station Dushanbe, Tajikistan

There is no direct connection between the northern and southern networks.

=== North Network ===
- Kokand (Uzbekistan)
- border UZ/TJ
- Konibodom
- Khujand (formerly Leninabad)
- border TJ/UZ
- Bekabad, Uzbekistan

=== South Network ===
==== Dushanbe - Iski-Guzar ====
- Dushanbe
- Vahdat (formerly Ordzhonikidzeabad)
- Iski-Guzar

==== Dushanbe - Denov ====
- Dushanbe
- Hisor
- Tursunzoda
- border TJ/UZ
- Denov, Uzbekistan

==== Dushanbe - Bokhtar - Kulob ====
- Dushanbe
- Obikiik
- Kuybyshevsk
- Bokhtar
- Sarband (formerly Kalininabad)
- Kulob

==== Bokhtar - Termez ====
- Bokhtar
- Kolkhozobod
- Shaartuz
- border TJ/UZ
- Termez, Uzbekistan

==== Bokhtar - Yovon ====
- Bokhtar
- Yovon

=== Proposed ===
A railway link from Tajikistan through Afghanistan to Iran has been proposed, and construction of part of the new connection is underway.

- Dushanbe
- Vahdat
- Yovon
- Bokhtar
- Shaartuz
- Aivadj
- border TJ/AF Pyanj River
- Mazar-i-Sharif

== See also ==
- Transport in Tajikistan
- Tajik Railway, operator of the rail network in Tajikistan https://www.railway.tj
