= Mirzo Tursunzoda, Shahrinav District =

Mirzo Tursunzoda
- Town and Jamoat
- Location within Tajikistan
- Coordinates: 38°31′48″N 68°20′07″E
- Country: Tajikistan
- Region: Districts of Republican Subordination
- District: Shahrinav District

Population (2020)
  - Total: 7,900
- Time zone: UTC+5 (TJT)

Mirzo Tursunzoda (Tajik: Мирзо Турсунзода, formerly: Oktyabr) is a town and jamoat in Tajikistan. It is located in Shahrinav District, one of the Districts of Republican Subordination. The population of the town is 7,900 (January 2020 estimate).
