= Shahritus =

Town in Khatlon Region, Tajikistan

Shahritus Шаҳритӯс
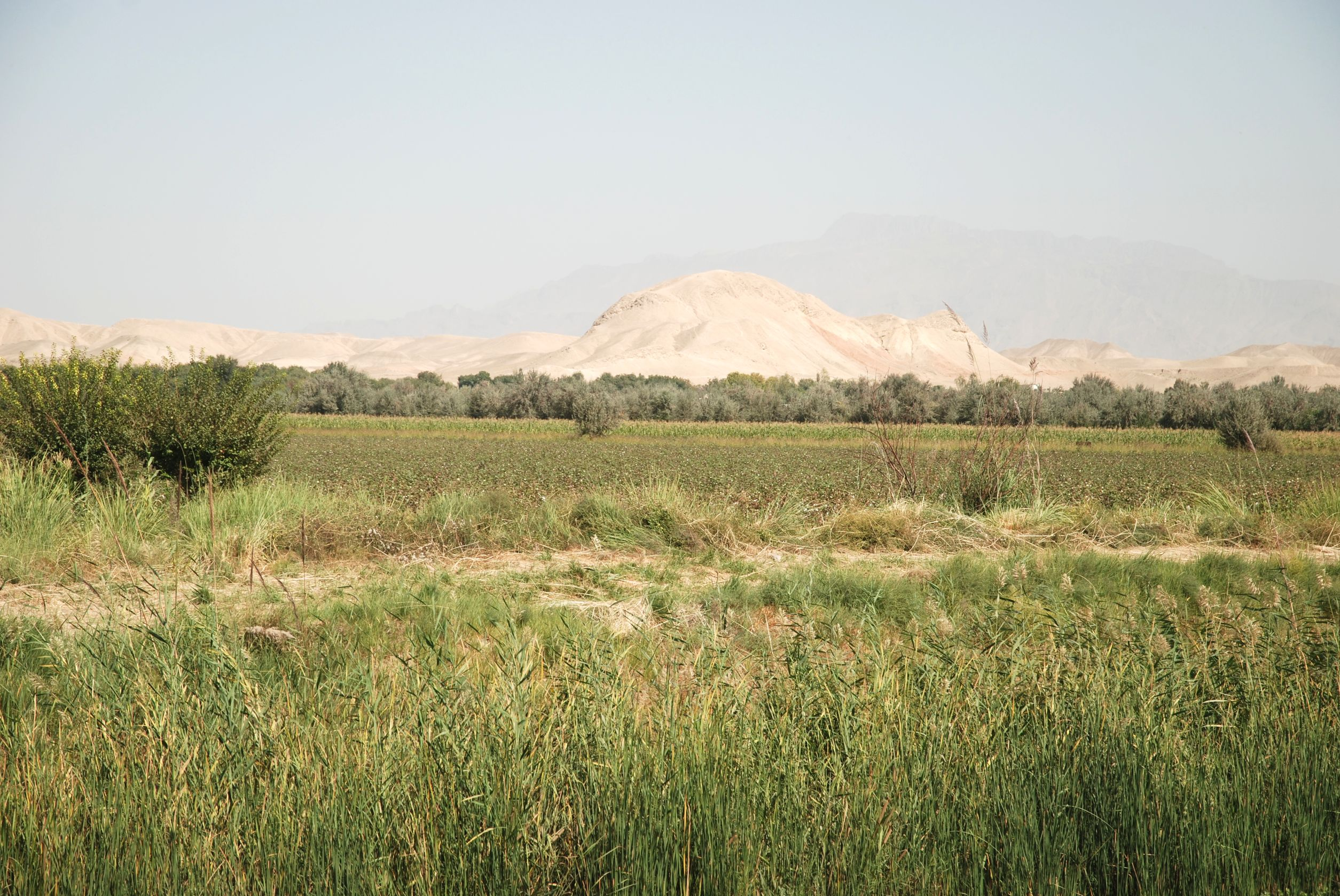
- Shahritus (Shaartuz), 4 km west cotton field

- Location in Tajikistan
- Coordinates: 37°16′N 68°08′E
- Country: Tajikistan
- Region: Khatlon Region
- District: Shahritus District
- Elevation: 367 m (1,204 ft)

Population (2020)
  - Total: 17,200
- Time zone: UTC+5

Shahritus (before 2021 Shahrituz Tajik: Шаҳритуз. , now Шаҳритӯс Shahritŭs) is a town in Khatlon Region, southwestern Tajikistan. Situated on the river Kofarnihon, the city was founded in 1938. Its population is 17,200 (January 2020 estimate). It is the seat of the Shahritus District.

== Geography ==
=== Climate ===
Shahritus has a cold semi-arid climate (Köppen climate classification BSk). The average annual temperature is 17.2 °C (63.0 °F). The warmest month is July with an average temperature of 30.2 °C (86.4 °F) and the coolest month is January with an average temperature of 3.3 °C (37.9 °F). The average annual precipitation is 235.7 mm (9.28 in) and has an average of 59.2 days with precipitation. The wettest month is March with an average of 58.0 mm (2.28 in) of precipitation and the driest month is August with an average of 0 mm of precipitation.

Climate data for Shahrituz
Month	Jan	Feb	Mar	Apr	May	Jun	Jul	Aug	Sep	Oct	Nov	Dec	Year
Daily mean °C (°F)	3.3 (37.9)	5.8 (42.4)	11.6 (52.9)	18.2 (64.8)	23.5 (74.3)	28.6 (83.5)	30.2 (86.4)	28.1 (82.6)	23.2 (73.8)	17.0 (62.6)	10.7 (51.3)	5.8 (42.4)	17.2 (63.0)
Average precipitation mm (inches)	34.5 (1.36)	37.2 (1.46)	58.0 (2.28)	39.0 (1.54)	18.8 (0.74)	0.5 (0.02)	0.2 (0.01)	0.0 (0.0)	0.1 (0.00)	5.7 (0.22)	16.0 (0.63)	25.7 (1.01)	235.7 (9.28)
Average precipitation days (≥ 0.1 mm)	7.9	8.6	11.1	9.1	5.9	0.8	0.4	0.0	0.1	2.8	4.8	7.7	59.2
Average relative humidity (%)	74.1	70.8	67.7	62.5	49.1	33.7	32.3	33.4	36.4	46.8	60.3	71.5	53.2
Source: "The Climate of Shahrituz". Weatherbase.

== Transport ==
The railway crosses the river at this point.

== See also ==
- Railway stations in Tajikistan
