= Nurobod District, Tajikistan =

Nurobod District Russian: Нурабадский район Tajik: Ноҳияи Нуробод
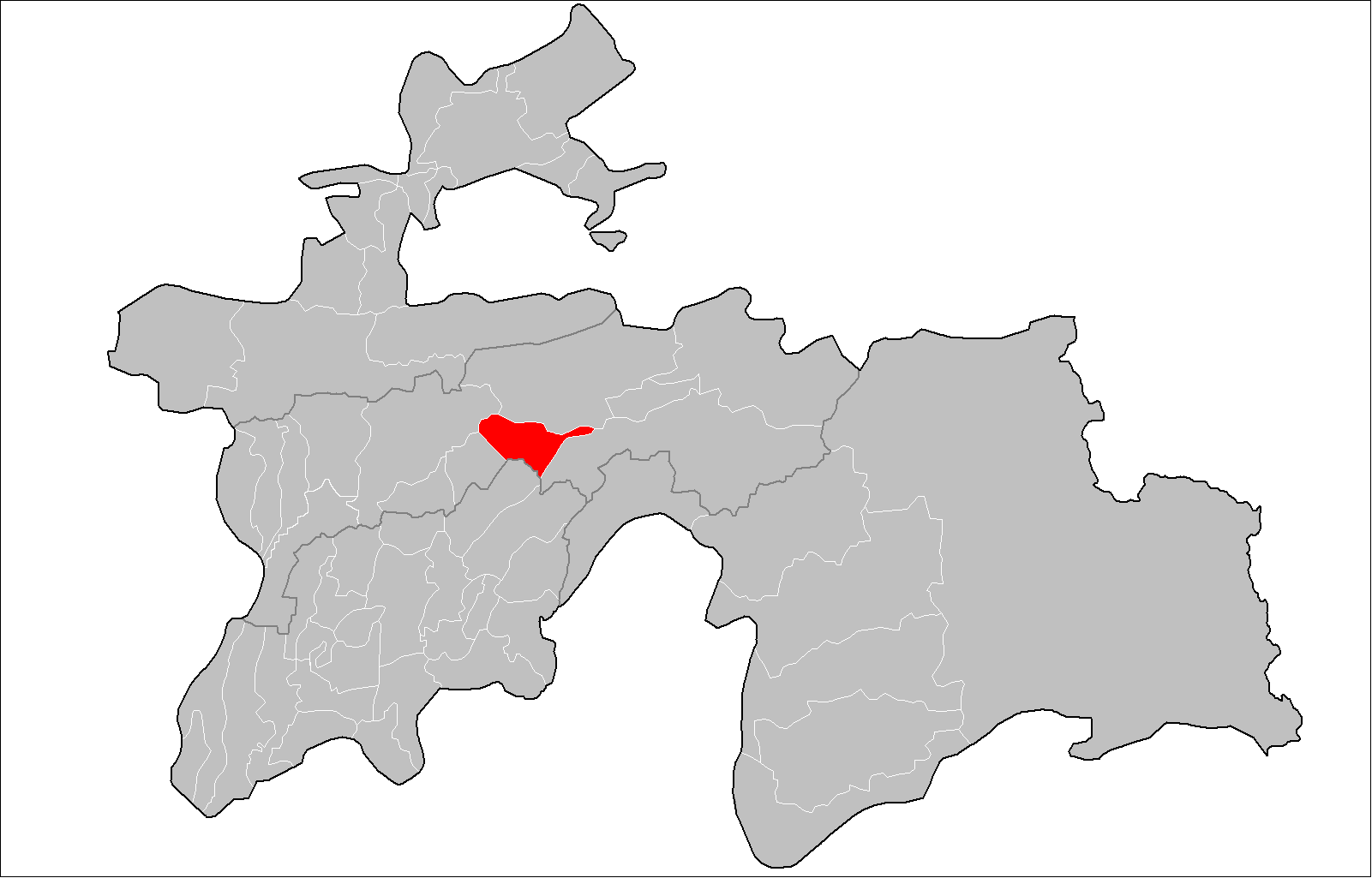
- Location of the district in Tajikistan
- Coordinates: 38°51′N 70°05′E
- Country: Tajikistan
- Region: Districts of Republican Subordination
- Capital: Darband

Area
  - Total: 900 km^{2} (350 sq mi)

Population (2020)
  - Total: 82,100
  - Density: 91/km^{2} (240/sq mi)
- Time zone: UTC+5
- Official languages: Russian (Interethnic); Tajik (State) (Note: Constitution of Tajikistan)
- Website: www.nurobod.tj

Nurobod District (Tajik: Ноҳияи Нуробод, Russian spelling: Nurabad District) is a district in Tajikistan, one of the 9 Districts of Republican Subordination. Formerly known as Darband District, Nurobod District lies east of the city of Roghun, south of the city of Vahdat and Rasht District, and west of Sangvor District. Its southern border is with the Khatlon Region. The capital of Nurobod District is the town Darband. The population of the district is 82,100 (January 2020 estimate).

== Administrative divisions ==
The district has an area of about 900 km^{2} (300 sq mi) and is divided administratively into one town and six jamoats. They are as follows:

Jamoat	Population (Jan. 2015)
Darband (town)	1,200
Hakimi	13,666
Izzatullo Halimov	8,035
Khumdon	
Mehrobod	15,046
Mujiharf	17,366
Safedchashma	8,015
