= Dehmoy =

- Village and Jamoat
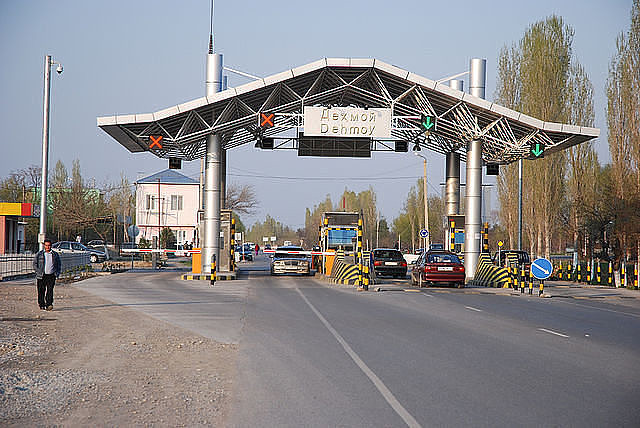

- Location in Tajikistan
- Coordinates: 40°13′N 69°31′E
- Country: Tajikistan
- Region: Sughd Region
- District: Jabbor Rasulov District

Population (2015)
  - Total: 14,802
- Time zone: UTC+5 (TJT)

Dehmoy is a village and jamoat in western Tajikistan. It is located in Jabbor Rasulov District in Sughd Region. The jamoat has a total population of 14,802 (2015).
