= Rudaki District =

Rudaki District (Russian: Район Рудаки) (Tajik: Ноҳияи Рӯдакӣ)
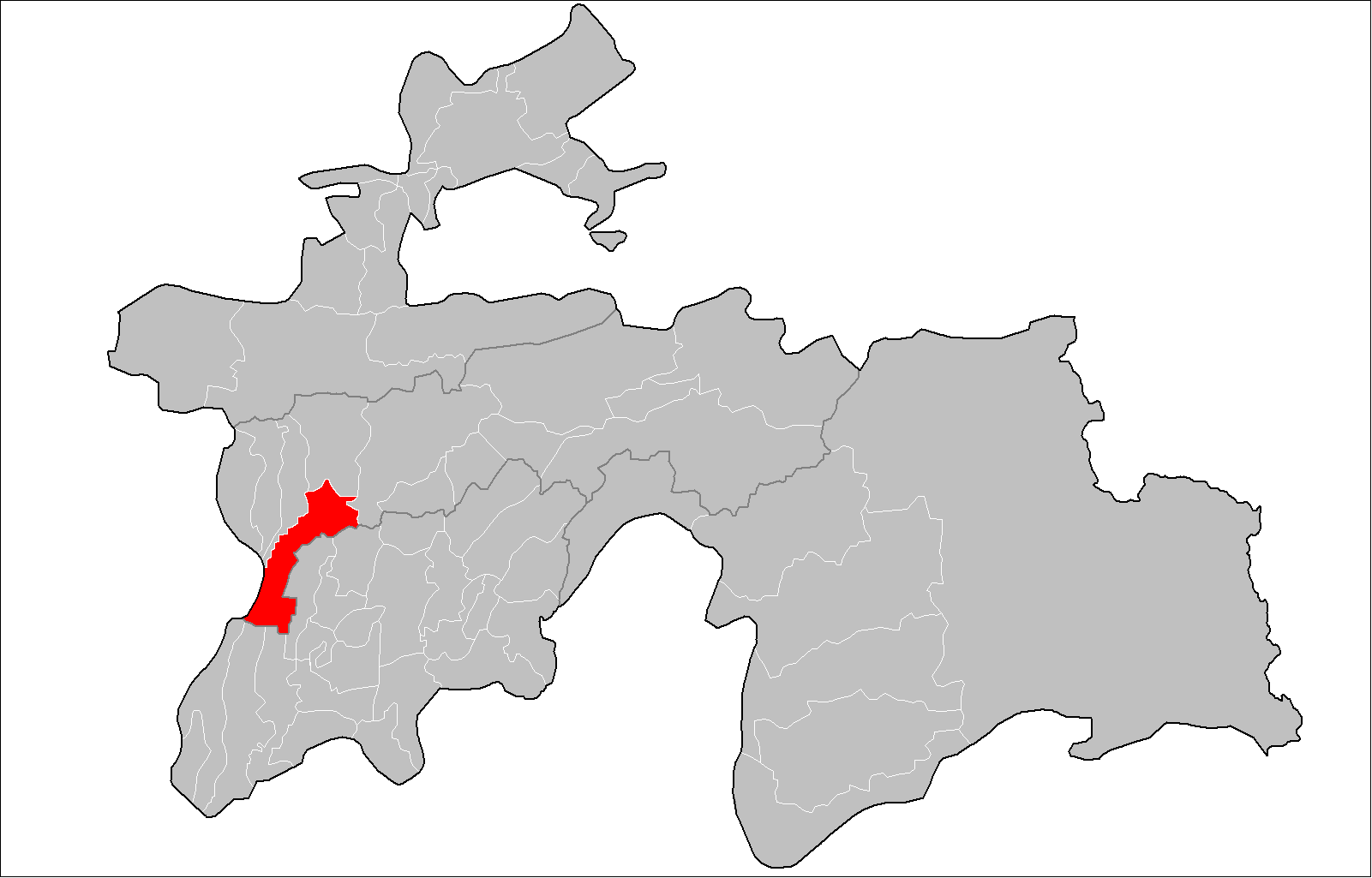
- Location of the district in Tajikistan
- Coordinates: 38°21′N 68°37′E
- Country: Tajikistan
- Region: Districts of Republican Subordination
- Capital: Somoniyon

Area
  - Total: 1,800 km^{2} (690 sq mi)

Population (2020)
  - Total: 518,200
  - Density: 290/km^{2} (750/sq mi)
- Time zone: UTC+5
- Official languages: Russian (Interethnic); Tajik (State)
- Website: nrudaki.tj

Rudaki District (Russian: Район Рудаки; Tajik: Ноҳияи Рӯдакӣ Nohiyai Rudaki) is a district in Tajikistan, one of the Districts of Republican Subordination. It stretches south from Dushanbe, bordering on Shahrinav District, the city of Hisor, and Varzob District from the north and northwest, Tajikistan's Khatlon Region from the south and the east, and Uzbekistan from the west. Its administrative capital is Somoniyon, a southern suburb of Dushanbe, called Leninsky in the Soviet period. The population of the district is 518,200 (January 2020 estimate).

A border guard training center is located here, used by the Tajik Border Troops. In October 2013, the Tajik Interior Ministry opened a new police station in the district.

== Administrative divisions ==
The district has an area of about 1,800 km^{2} (700 sq mi) and is divided administratively into three towns and thirteen jamoats. They are as follows:

Jamoat	Population (Jan. 2015)
Navobod (town)	9,100
Somoniyon (town)	22,600
Mirzo Tursunzoda (town)	17,900
Chimteppa	45,221
Chorgulteppa	37,551
Chorteppa	32,076
Choryakkoron	14,496
Esanboy	20,072
Guliston	41,130
Kiblai	13,860
Lohur	20,047
Rohati	32,152
Rossiya	31,030
Sarikishti	38,474
Sultonobod	16,066
Zainabobod	36,844
