= Tursun Tuychiev =

Tursun Tuychiev Турсун Туйчиев
- Jamoat
- Country: Tajikistan
- Region: Districts of Republican Subordination
- District: Tursunzoda

Population (2015)
  - Total: 29,051
  - Density: 39.7/km^{2} (102.8/sq mi)
- Time zone: UTC+5 (TJT)
- Official languages: Russian (Interethnic); Tajik (State)

Tursun Tuychiev (Russian: Турсун Туйчиев; Tajik: Турсун Тӯйчиев, formerly Pervomay) is a jamoat in Tajikistan. It is part of the city of Tursunzoda in Districts of Republican Subordination. The jamoat has a total population of 23,911 (2015).
