= Tursun (name) =

Tursun may refer to the following notable people:

Given name

- Tursun Beg, 15th century Ottoman bureaucrat and historian
- Tursun Uljabayev (1916–1988), Tajikistani politician

Surname

- Fatma Özlem Tursun (born 1988), Turkish football referee and former player
- Mihrigul Tursun (born 1989), is Uyghur detainee in China
- Perhat Tursun (born 1969), Uyghur writer and poet
- Sanubar Tursun (born 1971), Uyghur singer-songwriter
