= Tursunzoda =

Tursunzoda Russian: Турсунзаде Tajik: Tursunzoda
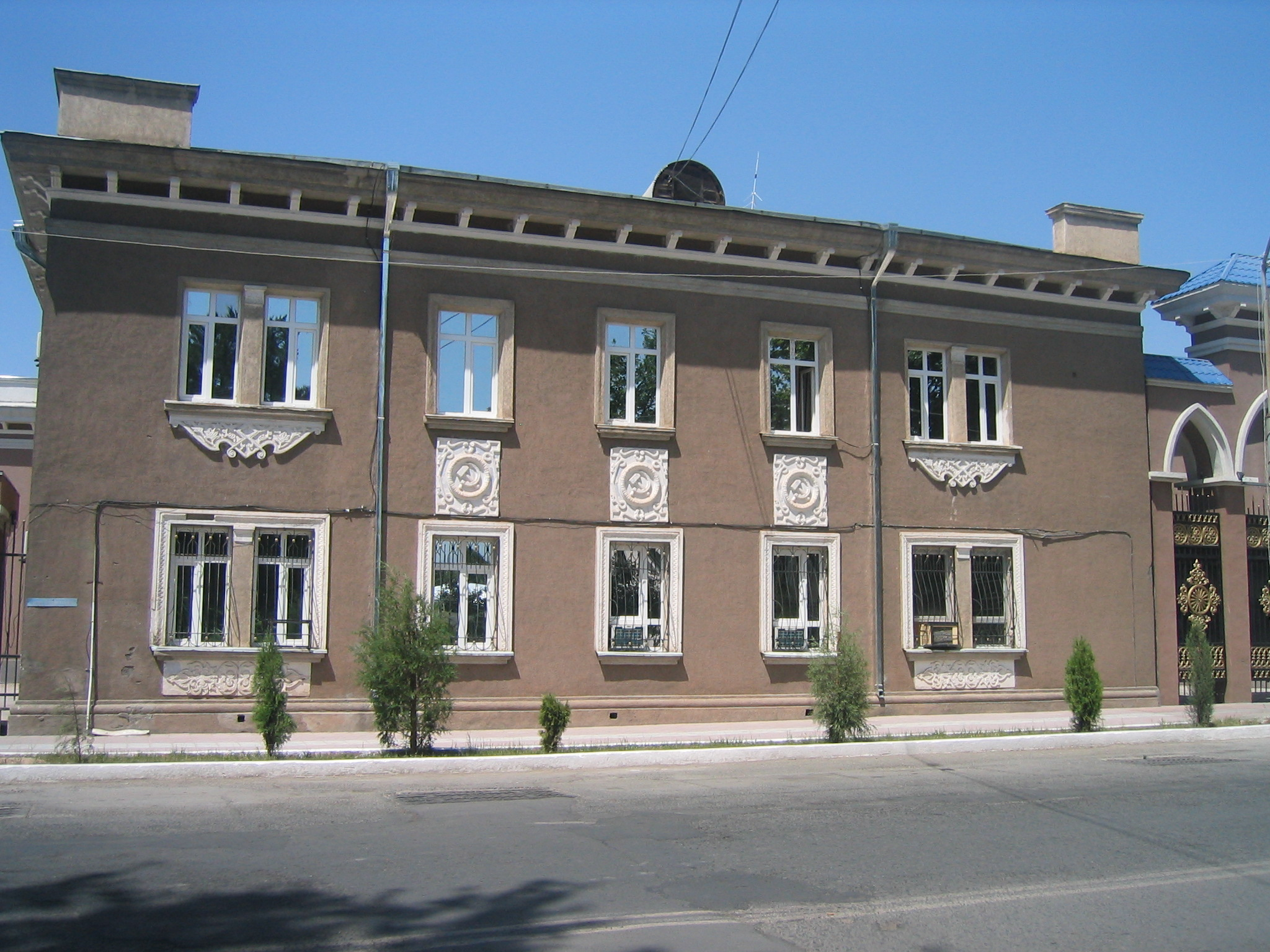
- Tursunzoda Government House

- Location in Tajikistan
- Coordinates: 38°30′39″N 68°13′49″E
- Country: Tajikistan
- Region: Districts of Republican Subordination

Population (2020)
  - City: 298,800
  - Urban: 55,700
- Official languages: Russian (Interethnic); Tajik (State)
- Website: http://regar.tj

Tursunzoda (Tajik: Турсунзода; also Tursunzade from Russian: Турсунзаде) is a city in western Tajikistan, known for its aluminium smelting plant TadAZ. It is located 60 km west of Dushanbe (40 km west of Hisor), near the border with Uzbekistan. It is near several rivers, Shirkent and Karatag immediately to the west and east of the city, and Kofarnihon further east. Its population is estimated at 55,700 for the city proper and 298,800 for the city with the outlying communities (2020). Its population was given as 40,600 in the 1989 census, falling to 39,000 in 2000, and estimated at 37,000 in 2006.

The city has two television stations, TV-REGAR and TV-TADAZ, two newspapers, Aluminiy Tojikiston and Regar, and a radio station.

Tursunzoda is home to football club Regar-TadAZ Tursunzoda.

== History ==
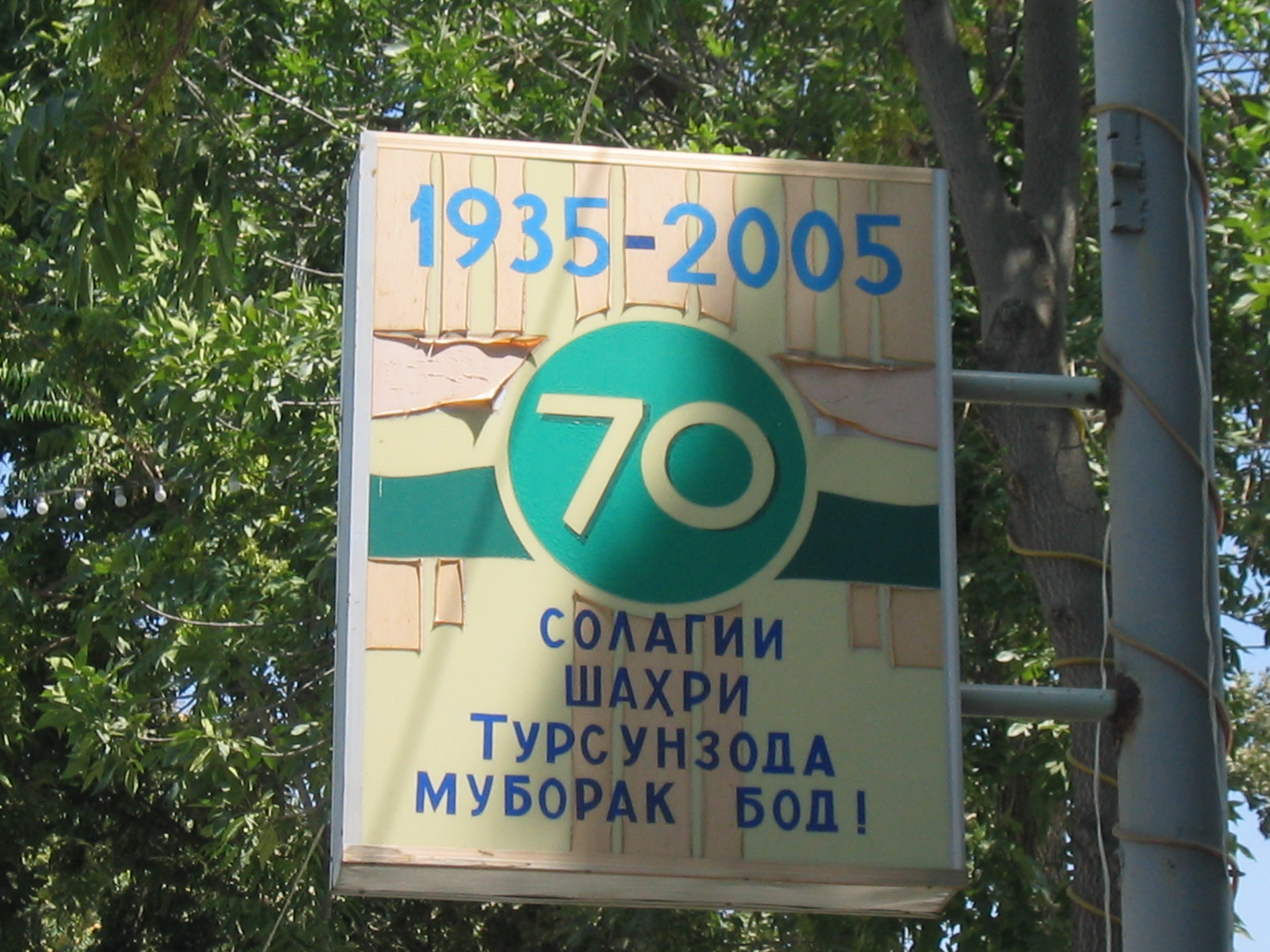
Sign celebrating 70 years of the city

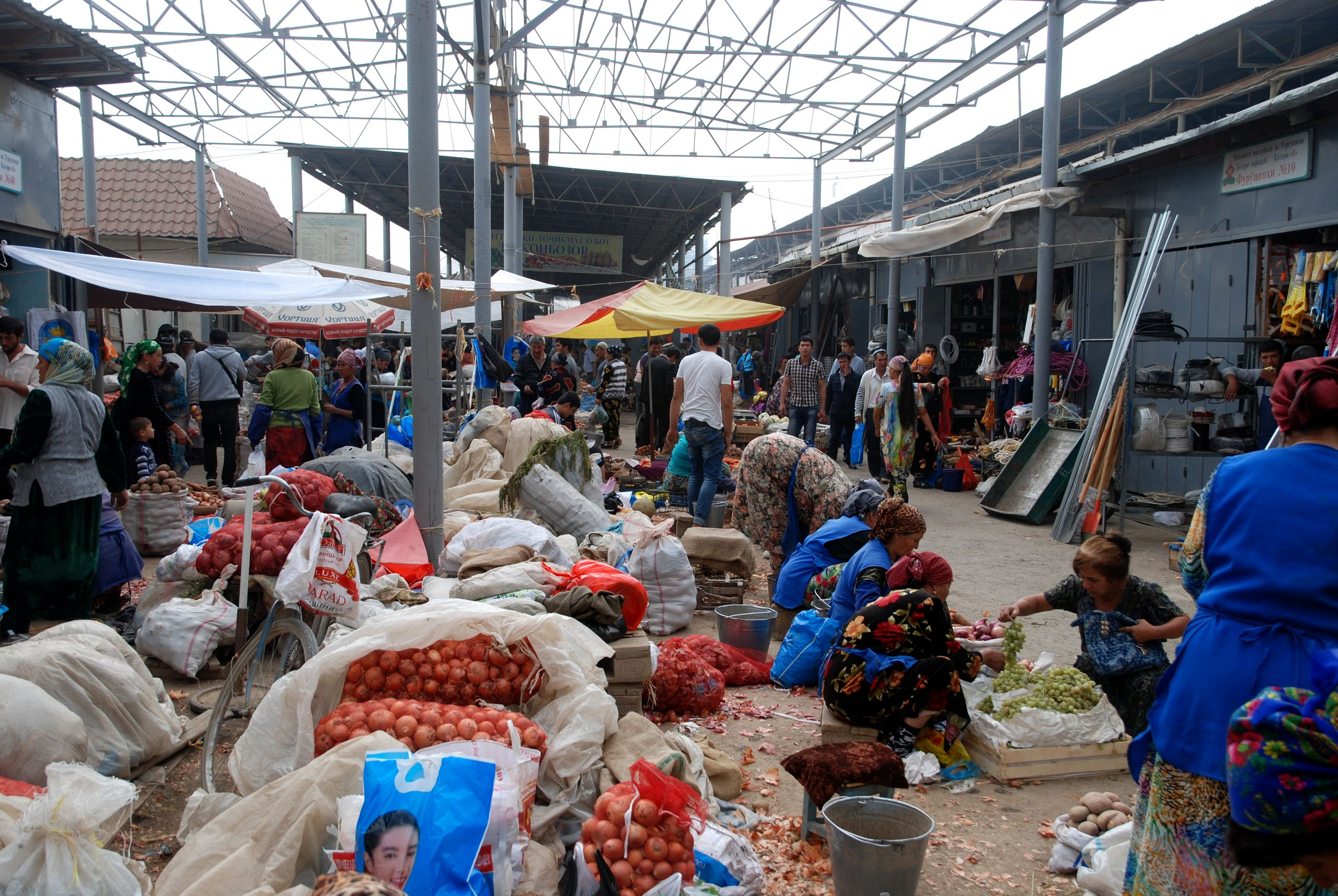
Tursunzoda Central Marketplace

Tursunzoda was originally the village of Regar, meaning "a town on sand". In 1978, the town and with it the whole district were renamed in honor of the Tajik national poet, Mirzo Tursunzoda. Its railroad station is still called Regar. The city developed from a village as a regional centre for an agricultural district in the western part of Gissar (Hisor) Valley. Fruits, especially grapefruit, vegetables, and cotton are grown in the district. Thanks to plentiful irrigation from the local rivers, Tursunzoda district is a major rice-growing region, producing 1,400 tons, or 13% of Tajikistan's rice harvest in 2006. In the 1960s, the nearby Nurek Dam hydroelectric power station on the river Vakhsh made the city a good location for industry, and besides the aluminium plant, there are also china, brick, cable, and cotton cleaning plants. During the Tajikistani Civil War, the city came under the control of warlord Mahmud Khudoyberdiev.

== Subdivisions ==
Before ca. 2018, Tursunzoda was the seat of Tursunzoda District, which covered the rural part of the present city of Tursunzoda. The city of Tursunzoda covers Tursunzoda proper and nine jamoats. These are as follows:

Jamoat	Population (Jan. 2015)
Navobod	36,979
Pakhtaobod	9,690
Qaratogh	37,948
Rabot	13,053
Jura Rahmonov	33,405
Regar	19,080
Seshanbe	15,197
10-Solagii Istiqloliyat	29,492
Tursun Tuychiev	23,911

== Aluminium plant ==
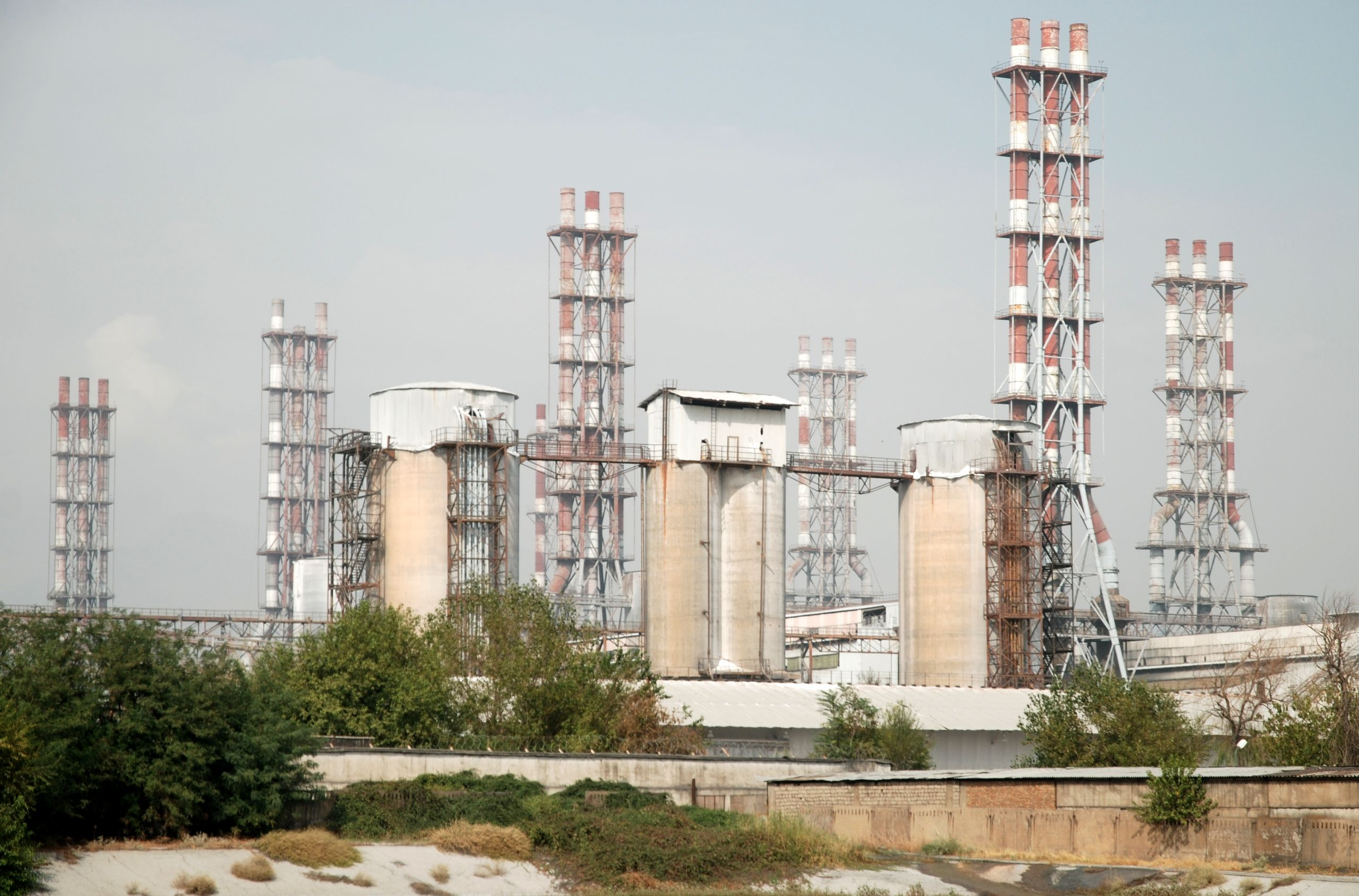
The TALCO plant in Tursunzoda

The Tajik aluminium smelting plant, TadAZ, in Tursunzoda, is the largest aluminium manufacturing plant in Central Asia, and possibly the world, and Tajikistan's chief industrial asset. The country has no native aluminium ore, so the raw material for the plant has to be imported. Construction of the plant proper began in 1972, and the first pouring of aluminium took place on March 31, 1975. It consumes 40% of the country's electrical power, and a 2002 study found it responsible for notable fluorine water pollution in the region and air pollution.
