= Districts under Central Government Jurisdiction =

Region of Tajikistan

Districts under Central Government Jurisdiction Tajik: Ноҳияҳои тобеи ҷумҳурӣ Russian: Районы республиканского подчинения
- Region
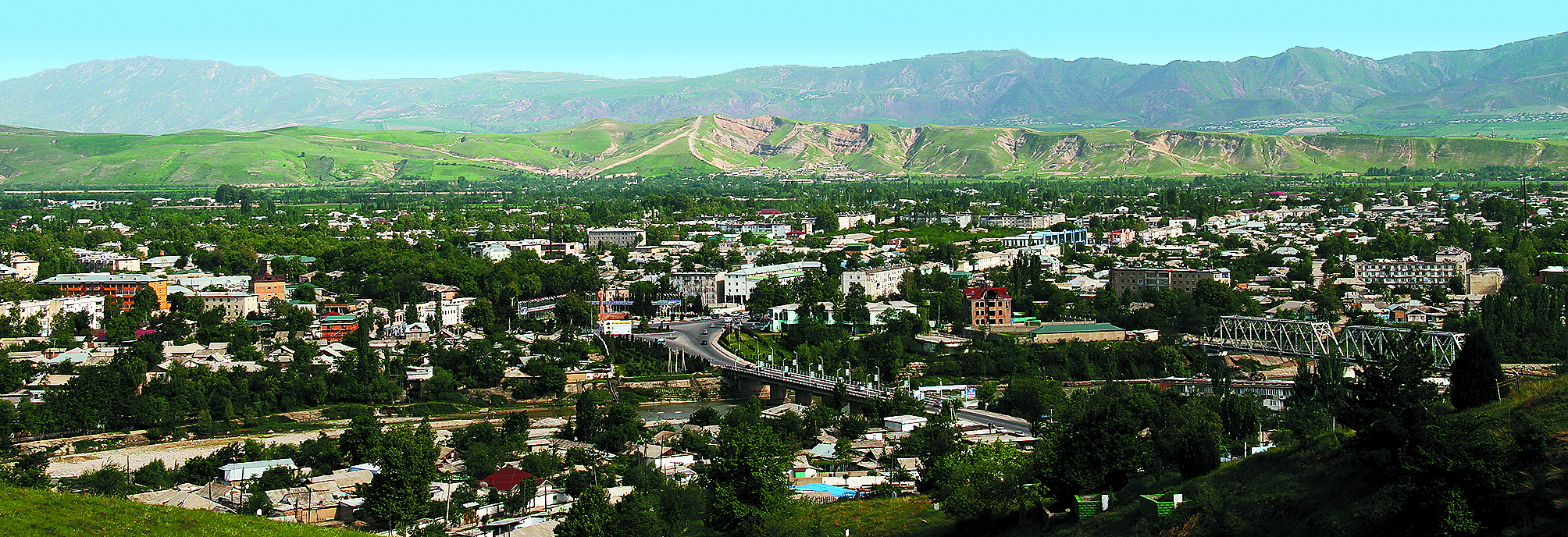
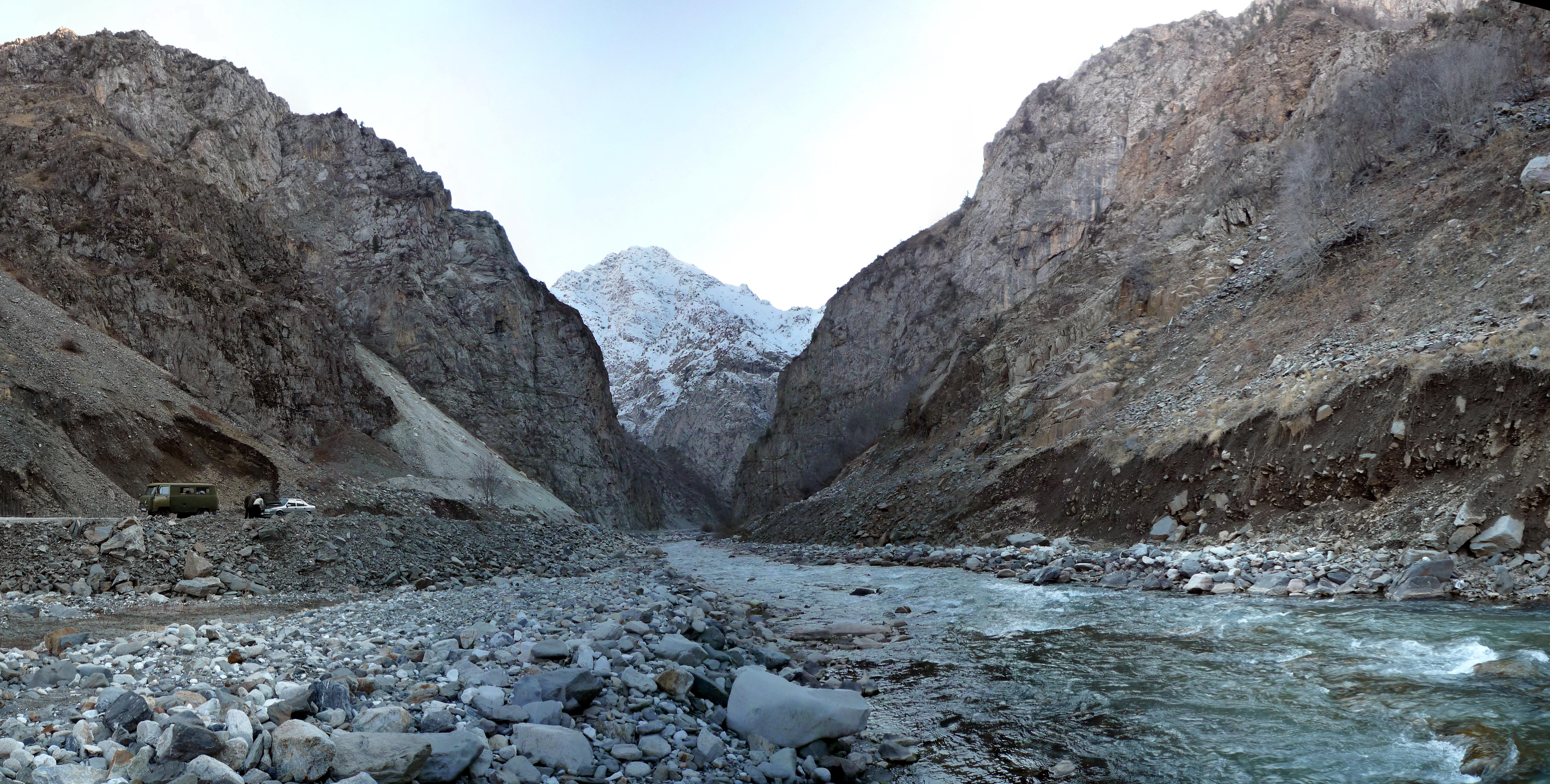
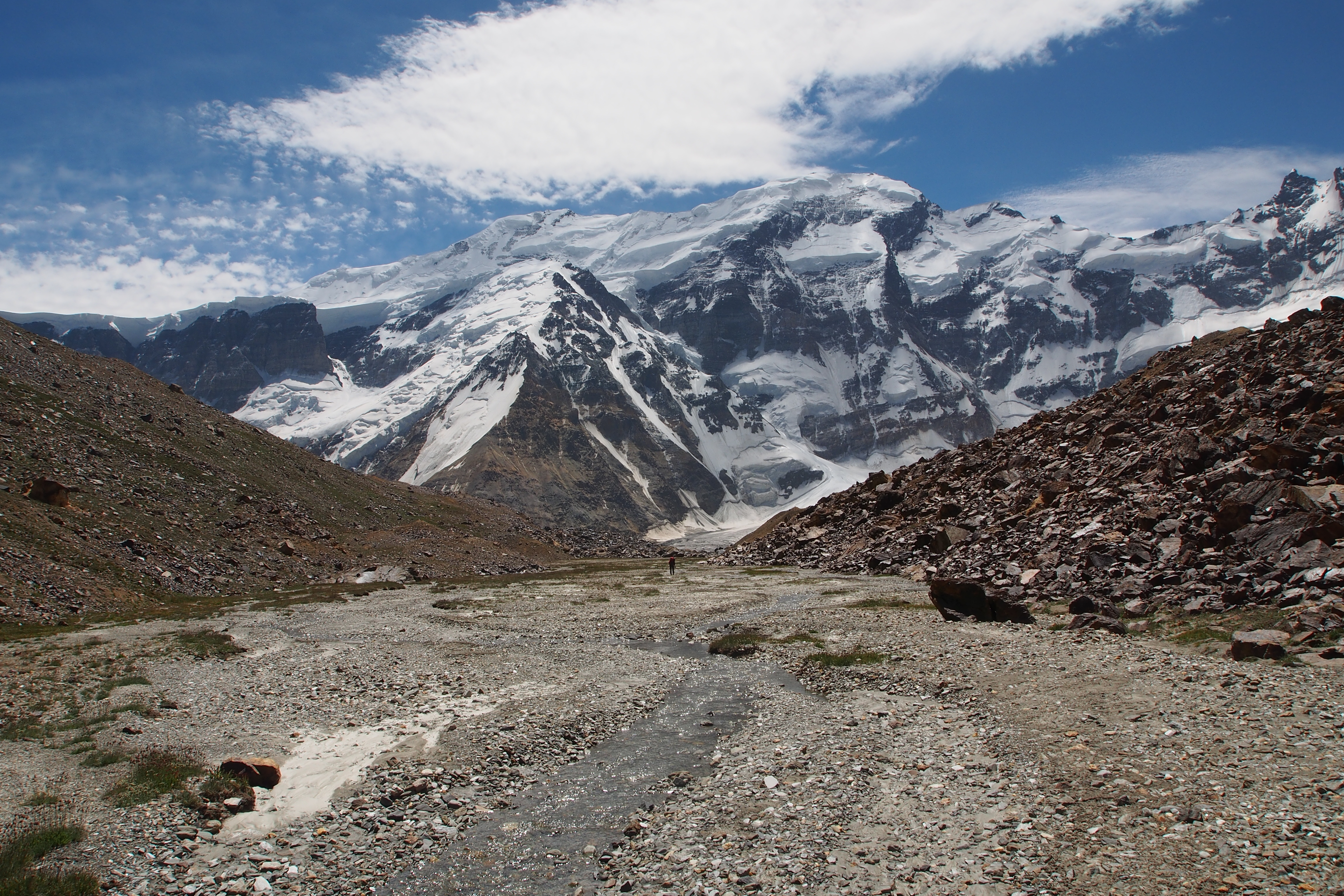
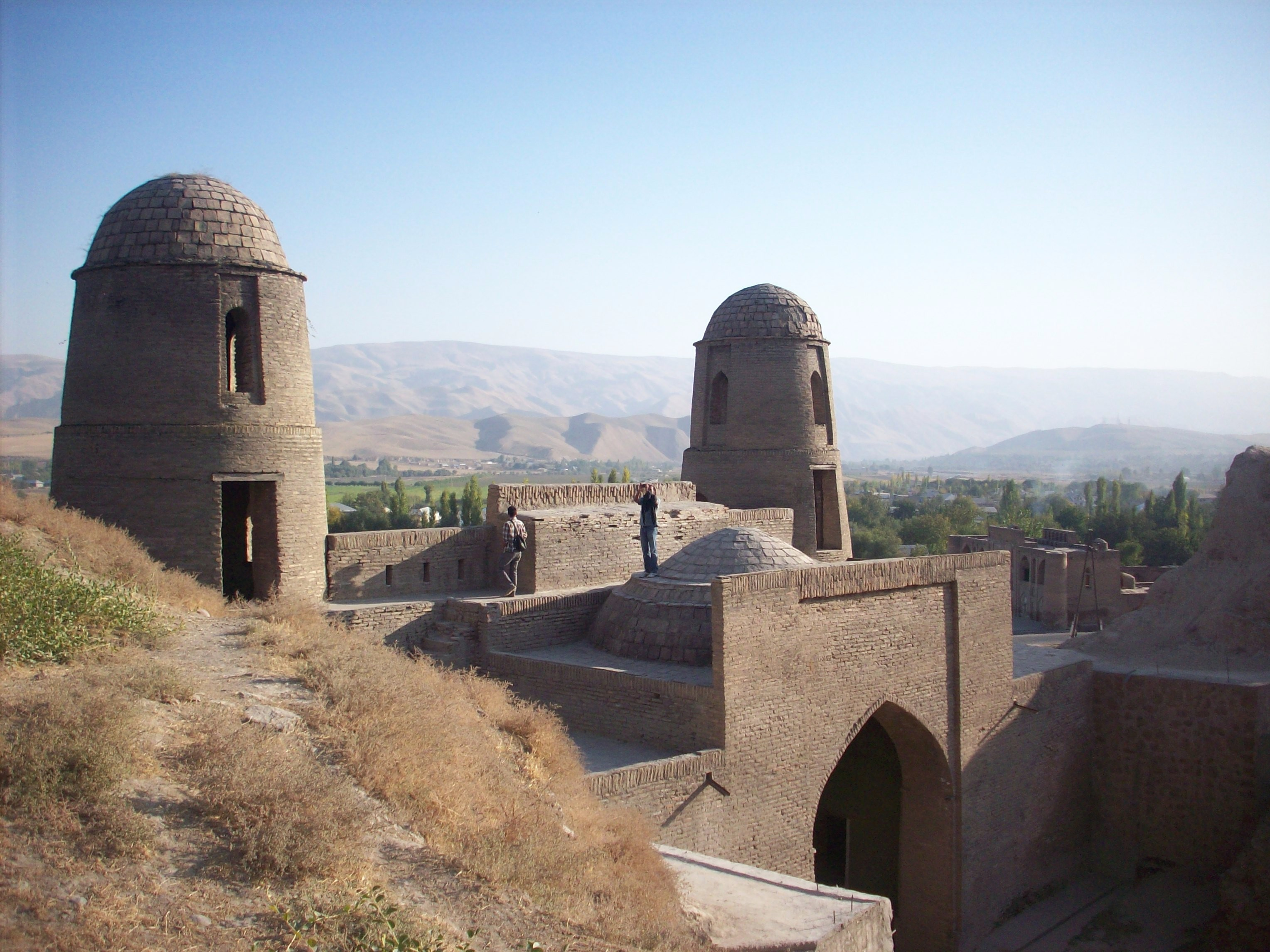
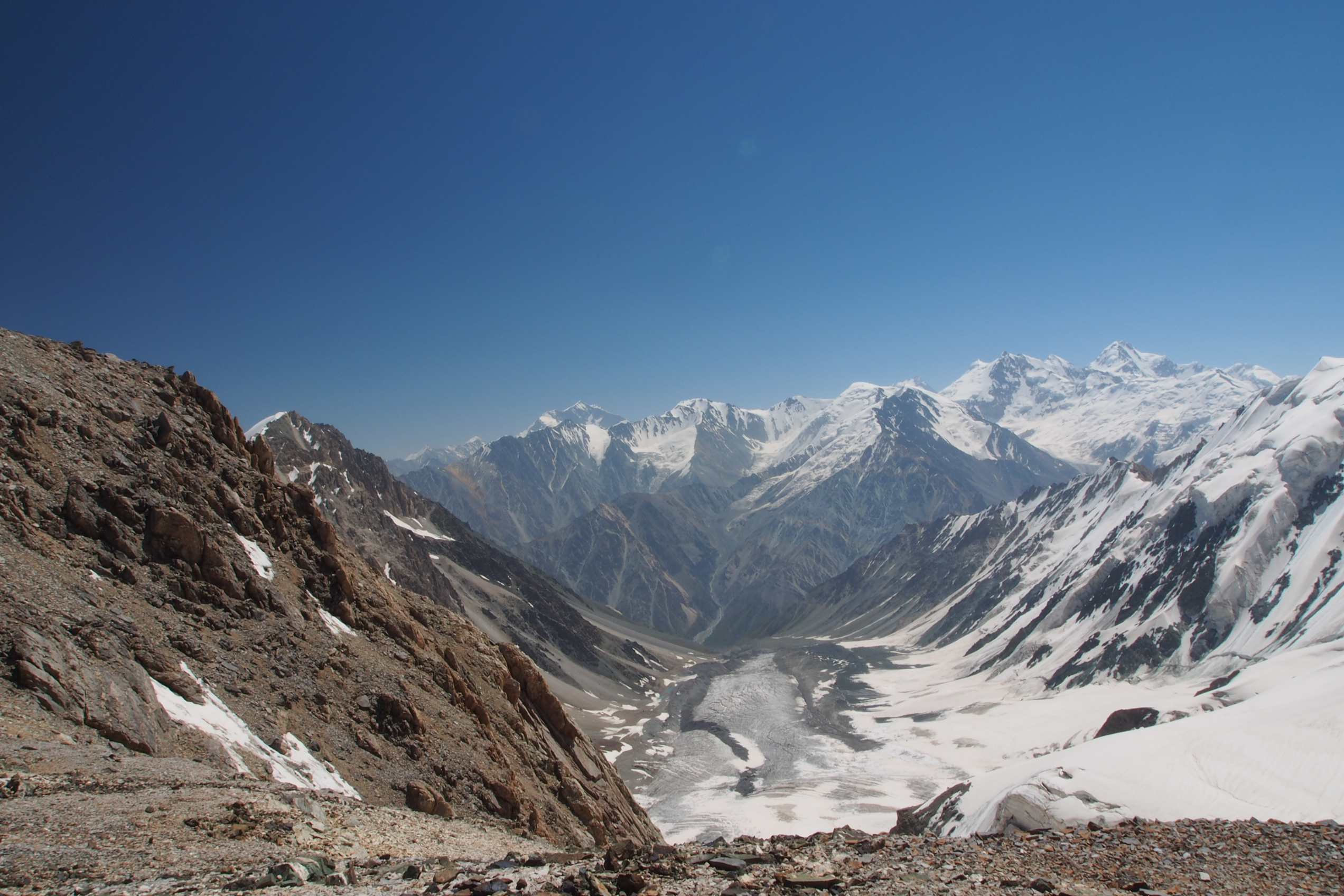
- From the top, Vahdat, Varzob District, Sangvor District, Hisor Fortress, Jirgatol District Varzob Ravine

- Districts under Central Government Jurisdiction in Tajikistan
- Coordinates: 39°0′N 70°0′E
- Country: Tajikistan
- Capital: Dushanbe

Area
  - Total: 28,500 km^{2} (11,000 sq mi)

Population (2020)
  - Total: 2,165,900
  - Density: 76.0/km^{2} (197/sq mi)
- ISO 3166 code: TJ-RA
- HDI (2023): 0.684 medium
- Official languages: Russian (interethnic); Tajik (state)

Districts under Central Government Jurisdiction, also translated as Districts under Republican Subordination (Russian: Районы республиканского подчинения; Tajik: Ноҳияҳои тобеи ҷумҳурӣ, romanized: Nohiyahoyi tobe’i jumhuriy), is a region in Tajikistan, consisting of 9 districts and 4 district-level cities that are directly under central administration. Dushanbe, the capital of Tajikistan, is surrounded by the Districts under Central Government Jurisdiction, but not part of it. The region shares a border with Dushanbe, Sughd, GBAO, Khatlon, Kyrgyzstan (Batken and Osh regions) and Uzbekistan (Surxondaryo). The region covers an area of 28,500 square kilometres, and has a total population of 2,165,900 (2020). The Districts' ethnic composition in 2010 was 85% Tajik and 11.7% Uzbek.

== History ==
After the dissolution of Stalinabad Oblast in 1951, the territories of the former province became directly subordinate to the government of the Tajik SSR, which is how the name came about. In 1955, the Gharm Oblast was dissolved and its territories became subordinate to the Republican Jurisdiction in the same manner. Nowadays, Districts under Central Government Jurisdiction cover much of the territory of those previously dissolved regions, except for Darvoz District which was moved to Gorno-Badakhshan Autonomous Region (when it was still named Qal'ai Khumb district).

== Districts ==
The Districts under Central Government Jurisdiction cover 9 districts. The districts are:

- Fayzobod District
- Lakhsh District (formerly Jirgatol District)
- Nurobod District (formerly Darband District)
- Rasht District (formerly Gharm District)
- Rudaki District (formerly Leninskiy District)
- Sangvor District (formerly Tavildara District)
- Shahrinav District (formerly Qaratogh District)
- Tojikobod District (formerly Qalai Labi Ob District)
- Varzob District

== District cities ==
- Vahdat (formerly Kofarnihon)
- Tursunzoda (formerly Regar)
- Hisor
- Roghun

== Geography ==
The plateau is traversed by the river Vakhsh, a right-hand tributary of the Amu Darya. On the northern border run the Gissar and Zeravshan mountains, and on the southern border the Darvaz range 7,600 metres (24,900 ft). The winter climate is extremely severe: snow begins to fall in October and it is May before it disappears. During the warmer months, however, the mountainsides are richly clothed with the foliage of maple, mountain ash, apple, pear and walnut trees; the orchards furnish not only apples and pears, but peaches, cherries, mulberries and apricots. Both cattle and horses are of a small and hardy breed.

== Demographics ==
Historical population
Year	Pop.	±% p.a.
1979	757,976	—
1989	1,083,043	+3.63%
1999	1,337,479	+2.13%
2010	1,722,908	+2.33%
2020	2,165,900	+2.31%
Source: Citypopulation

== Culture ==
- Mausoleum of Hodja Nashron
