= Regions of Tajikistan =

Administratively, Tajikistan is divided into:

- one autonomous region (Tajik: вилояти мухтор, romanized: viloyati mukhtor; Russian: автономная область), Gorno-Badakhshan
- two regions (Tajik: вилоятҳо, romanized: viloyatho; Russian: область/вилоят, romanized: oblast; Persian: ولایت‌ها; sing. Tajik: viloyat, Persian: ولایت)
- the Districts under Central Government Jurisdiction
- the capital city, Dushanbe

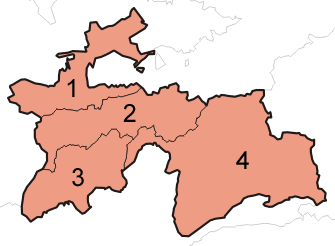
A clickable map of Tajikistan exhibiting its four provinces.

== List of regions ==
No.	Name	Russian	Tajik	ISO	Capital	Area (km^{2})	Pop. (2000)	Pop. (2010)	Pop. (2019)
1	Sughd Region	Согдийская область Sogdijskaya oblastʹ	Вилояти Суғд; Viloyati Sughd	TJ-SU	Khujand	25,400	1,871,979	2,233,550	2,658,400
2	Districts under Republic Subordination	Районы республиканского подчинения Rajoni respublikanskovo podchineniya	Ноҳияҳои тобеи ҷумҳурӣ Nohiyahoi tobei jumhurī	TJ-RA	Dushanbe	28,600	1,337,479	1,722,908	2,120,000
3	Khatlon Region	Хатлонская область Khatlonskaya oblastʹ	Вилояти Хатлон; Viloyati Khatlon	TJ-KT	Bokhtar	24,800	2,150,136	2,677,251	3,274,900
4	Gorno-Badakhshan Autonomous Region (Note: The Tajik name for Upper (Mountainous) Badakhshan is Kuhistoni Badakhshon, but the Russian name Gorno-Badakhshan is more commonly used in English.)	Горно-Бадахшанская автономная область Gorno-Badakhshanskaya avtonomnaya oblastʹ	Вилояти Мухтори Кӯҳистони Бадахшон; Viloyati Mukhtori Kūhistoni Badakhshon	TJ-GB	Khorugh	64,200	206,004	205,949	226,900
–	Dushanbe	Душанбе; Dushanbe	Душанбе; Dushanbe	TJ-DU	Dushanbe	124.6	561,895	724,844	846,400

== Administrative divisions ==
Each region is divided into districts (Tajik: ноҳия, nohiya or Russian: район, rayon), which are further subdivided into municipal units: either as urban municipalities called either as cities (Tajik: шаҳр, romanized: şahr, "cities") or towns (Tajik: шаҳрак, romanized: şahrak, "towns"), or as rural municipalities called jamoats (Tajik: ҷамоати деҳот, romanized: jamoati dehot, "village communes"), which in turn are further subdivided into villages/settlements (Tajik: деҳа or қишлоқ, romanized: deha or qyshloq, "villages/hamlets").

As of 2020, Tajikistan has a total of 47 (not including 4 districts of the capital city Dushanbe) districts; prior to 2017 it had about 58.

Type	Native name	Level	Number
Districts	ноҳия nohiya	2	47
Cities	шаҳр shahr	2	18
Jamoats		3	368
Towns	шаҳрак shahrak	3	65

== See also ==
- Districts of Tajikistan
- List of regions of Tajikistan by Human Development Index
- ISO 3166-2:TJ
- Yagnob Valley
