= Vahdat District =

Coordinates: 38°56′59″N 69°22′53″E

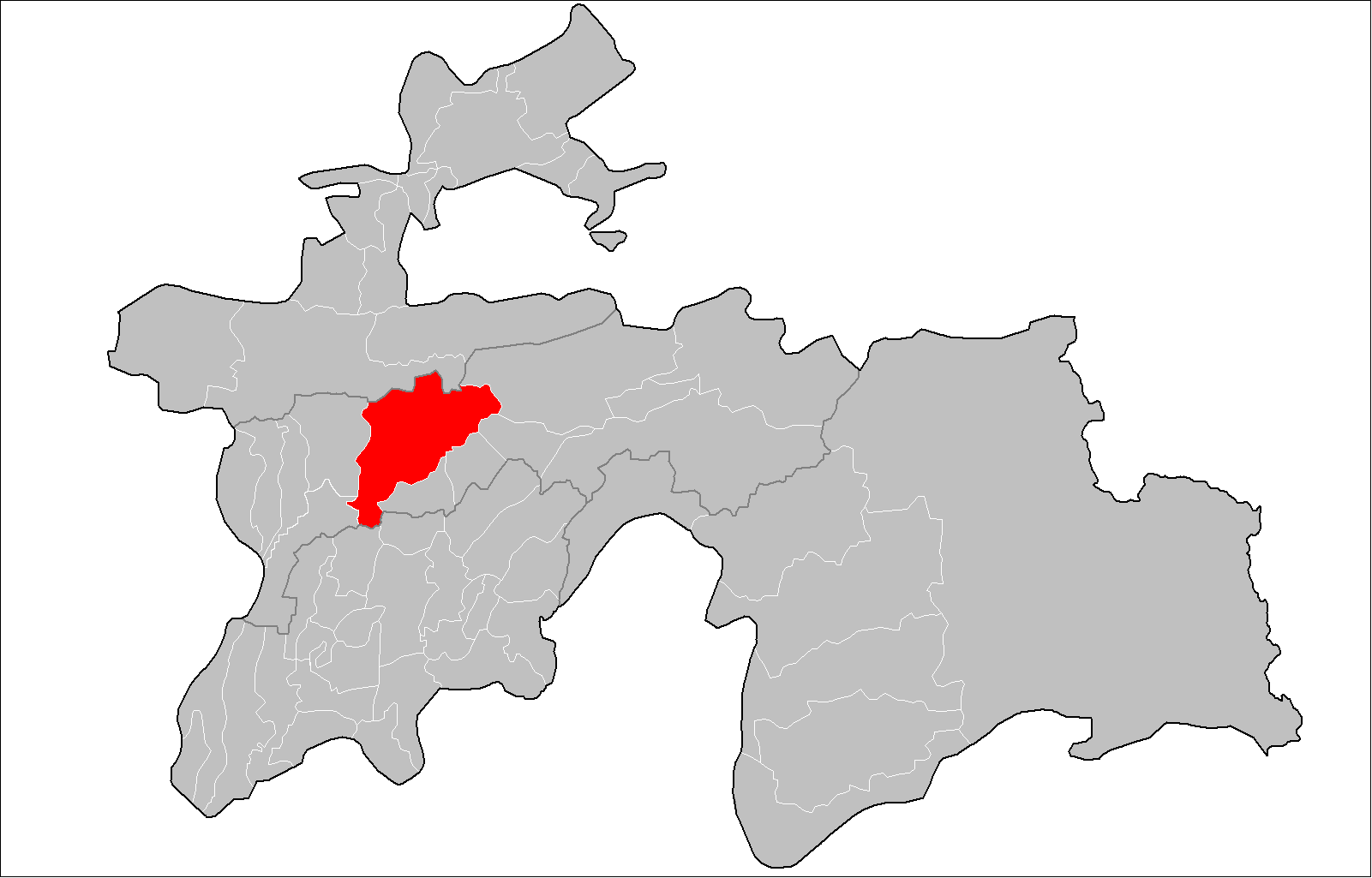
Location in Tajikistan

Vahdat District (also spelled Vakhdat (Russian: Вахдатский район), (Note: from the Russian romanization of Вахдат.) Tajik: Ноҳияи Ваҳдат, romanized: Nohiyayi Vahdat) is a former district of the Districts of Republican Subordination in Tajikistan, called Kofarnihon District until the introduction of a new administrative division in the end of 2003. During the Soviet period it was named Ordzhonikidzeabad district in honor of Georgian communist Grigoriy Ordzhonikidze. It extends east of Dushanbe along the southern slopes of the Gissar Range, bordering on Varzob District from the west and Rasht District from the east. Its long southern border runs (from west to east) along Khatlon Province and then Faizobod, Roghun, and Nurobod districts. The district capital Vahdat (formerly Ordzhonikidzeabad) is placed off-center at the extreme southwest of the district, just 10 km east of Dushanbe. Around 2018, the district was merged into the city of Vahdat.

== Administrative divisions ==
The district is divided administratively into jamoats. They are as follows (and population).

Jamoats of Vahdat District
Jamoat	Population
Bahor	22258
Chorsu	2871
Chuyangaron	13070
Eksiguzar	23131
Karasu	25513
Khojabaykul	14263
Kofarnihon	29682
Romit	10338
Simiganj	24249
Yangibozor	17178
