= Bozor Sobir =

Tajik poet and politician

- Born: 20 November 1938; Sufiyen, Vahdat District, Tajik Soviet Socialist Republic, USSR
- Died: 1 May 2018 (aged 79); Seattle, Washington, US
- Resting place: Luchob Cemetery, Dushanbe, Tajikistan
- Citizenship: Tajik SSR, Soviet Union, Tajikistan, United States
- Education: Masters in Philology
- Occupations: Poet, writer, senator, politician
- Writing career
- Language: Tajik, Persian, Russian, Ukrainian, German, Polish, Dari, Latvian, Uzbek, etc.
- Notable awards: National Rudaki Poetry Award; Star of the President III Degree
- Website: www.bozorsobir.com

Bozor Sobir (20 November 1938 – 1 May 2018) was a preeminent Tajik poet and politician, known as the national poet of Tajikistan and 'the conscience of the nation'.

Sobir established his reputation during the Soviet era. His poems, books, and articles have been published throughout the former Soviet Union and translated into Western languages, as well as Persian, Dari, Uzbek, Slavic languages, and several other languages of the Soviet Republics. His poetry books were also published in Afghanistan and Iran. Sobir's poetic style is known for its imagery, nationalism, patriotism, its inclusion of the history of the Tajik people, and also for its strong political views. Many of his poems have been set to music by various Tajik composers. After his poem We are of Siyovush's Bloodline (Az Khuni Siyovushem) was set to music, it became the de facto Tajikistan national anthem. As a poet, he contributed much to the revival of Tajik national culture after Mikhail Gorbachev's call for perestroika. Many Tajiks know his poems by heart. Sobir is a laureate of a prestigious National Rudaki Poetry Award, Tajikistan's most eminent prize for poetry (1988) and the Star of the President 3rd degree (2013).

With the advent of glasnost, Sobir became actively involved in political and cultural movements for an independent national identity. He was one of the founders of the Democratic Party, serving as its deputy leader. The Democratic Party was the secular component of the Democratic-Islamic coalition that governed Tajikistan in 1992, until it was overthrown by pro-communist forces with Russian military support. He was elected a senator in the Supreme Council of Tajikistan, but resigned from this post and remains the only politician to have done so. He also subsequently resigned from the party, reportedly because of a disagreement with the leadership over the growing Islamic elements within the party. A strong proponent of separation of state and religion, Sobir believed religious figures should not engage in politics.

Sobir remains popular in Tajikistan and is the best-known Tajik poet outside the country. Numerous books have been written about him and his poems. A play about his life called A Night Away from Homeland (Shabe Dur Az Vatan) was performed by the Tajik State Theater named after M. Vakhidov, with the role of Sobir played by the Honored Artist of Tajikistan, Abdumumin Sharifi.

== Biography ==
=== Early years and education ===
Bozor Sobir was born on 20 November 1938 in Sufiyen, which is part of the city of Ordzhonikidzobod (now Vahdat District) in Tajikistan. He is the fourth-youngest of seven children. After his father died at an early age, he was sent to study at a boarding school in Hisor in western Tajikistan, about 15 kilometres (9.3 mi) from the capital of Dushanbe. There, he met Turkish poet Nazim Hikmet, who visited the school as a speaker.

The poet's father was a government tax collector. His mother was a housewife. His younger brother Temur Sobirov was a respected mathematician, with a school and a street named after him in Tajikistan. His second youngest brother, also a mathematician, ran for a Senate seat. The poet's nephew, another mathematician, was the head of a Democratic Party in Tajikistan until his resignation in the 2000s. Another relative was head of the now-banned Islamic Renaissance Party of Tajikistan (IRPT), whose closure Bozor Sobir had advocated. His other siblings went into teaching.

The first publication of Bozor Sobir's poetry was in 1960, while he was a university student. In 1962, he completed his graduate work in philology and Tajik-Persian literature at the Tajik National University.

=== Writing career ===
After completing his studies, Sobir served as a translator in Afghanistan for a year. Thereafter, he worked at various newspapers and magazines in Soviet Tajikistan, including Education and Culture (Tajik: Maorif va Madaniyat), Voice of the East (Sadoi Shark), and Justice (Adolat).

He was also commissioned to translate works of British poet and politician Lord Byron, French poets Arthur Rimbaud and Guillaume Apollinaire, Chilean poet and politician Pablo Neruda, Russian poet Sergei Yesenin and Lithuanian-Soviet poet Eduardas Mieželaitis.

In 1979, he began working at the Writers' Union of Tajikistan as a poetry and editorial consultant. At their request, he edited and improved the poems of almost all famous Tajik poets throughout his lifetime, though he worked at the Writers' Union for ten years.

== Literary work ==
=== Style and contribution ===
The poems of Bozor Sobir are characterized by their novel form, penetrating lyricism, high spirituality, and a tense search for truth and beauty in work and love. Defining motifs are: the ancient and recent history of Tajikistan's people; the formation of national identity in the complex, changing world of the end of the 20th century; the comprehension of modernity through the moral experience of a man of the post-war generation; the beauty of his native land; and intimate lyrics with features of the mythological understanding of women and nature.

Sobir contributed much to the revival of Tajik national culture, the formation of the Tajik identity and building of a national consciousness in Tajikistan before, during and after the Soviet era. His poems are known for their imagery and creativity. They are nuanced, intricate, and make creative use of grammar, linguistic features, and subtle semantic features. The art of speech as praise, allegory, and antithesis is used in the artistry and imagery of his poems, which may account for their soulfulness.

According to a study of his works by Shahlo Tohiriyon, a notable feature of Sobir's poetry is that its style reveals the essence of the concept, the case and the images through comparison and contrasts. Antonyms in various forms and manifestations of meaning are a feature of his poetry. A certain order of application of antonyms and homonyms in the work of the poet indicates that he always expresses his opinion with exact thoughts about each word. The same use of one of the lexical means of expression, such as synonyms, homonyms and antonyms, is found in almost every poem by Sobir.

While a majority of his early poems have romantic elements and imagery of his birthplace, from the late 1970s there is a change in direction: themes of Tajik ancestry, their ancient Zoroastrian religion, history, and patriotism. His poems became highly political, including current national and international events, and at times anti-religious.

=== Poems of the independence movement ===
Sobir's poem about the history of Tajiks and the Tajik language, Mother Tongue (Zaboni Modari), shows indignation about the sad history of the only Persian minority in Central Asia (i.e. the Tajiks). Written on the eve of independence, became an anthem for Tajik nationalists at the time. The poem tells the history of Tajiks, their accomplishments, great figures, and the losses. The poem highlights the importance of the Tajik language in maintaining the Tajik nation. The poem was written when Russian was the dominating language in Tajikistan, and the Tajik language had been relegated to unofficial non-governmental matters.

Sobir saw the promotion of the Tajik language for Tajik people, during the predominance of use of Russian in Soviet times, as of utmost importance. He was one of the very few who actively wrote and politically worked to ignite people's awareness about Tajik identity, history, and traditions.

The feeling of having been robbed throughout history is prominent in this poem, as is the resentment about the fact that Bukhara and Samarkand, the ancient Iranian cities and the traditional centers of the Tajiks' literature and culture, were in 1929 allotted to Uzbekistan by the foundation of the Soviet Republics. Bukhara and Samarkand feature as lost Tajik treasures, and ancient pre-Islamic Zoroastrian heritage is placed in the foreground (as can be seen by references made to the Shahnameh figures Rostam and Sohrab, the Soghdians). The poem expresses the quest for lost roots.

These sentiments amalgamated in the formation of new political parties, such as Rastokhez (transl. Resurrection). This party in particular was focusing on Iran as a political example. Although Sobir was one of the founders of the Democratic Party, he wrote On the Foundation of Resurrection, published in 1991. This poem an open support of opposition and rebellion and is much less acquiescent than Sobir's earlier work.

The poem Square of Freedom (Maydoni Ozodi) conjured the electrified atmosphere of the square where protests for independence took place. The calls for independence were seen as returning and embracing one's forgotten roots. The poem elevates the square to the nation's place of prayer.

=== Poetry of the civil war ===
During the Tajikistani Civil War (1992–1997), Sobir wrote poems about the tragedy of the war:

Warm blood shed through love of blood relations
Bridges of kinship broken
In the waters of orphans' eyes.
My Kulob has heedlessly gone its way -
Gone, perhaps, until the day of Resurrection.
No bridge is left but that across the chasm of Hell,
Alas, alas!

The bridge refers to the Chinvat Bridge of Zoroastrianism (the religion of Tajiks before Islam), which is "finer than a hair and sharper than a sword" over which all must pass to the hereafter. A sifting bridge, the righteous will cross safely while the wicked will tumble into the infernal fires.

=== Poetry of secularism ===
Some years following his exile, some of Sobir's poems developed a new anti-Islam theme. The poet saw religion as a menace to development and progress of society, and felt that religious leaders had contributed nothing concrete toward improving the lives of humans.

Our ancestors were ardent preachers of Islam, but did nothing for society. They didn't feed anyone nor did they clothe anyone. The poor remained poor, the rich rich. Only there was hope for happiness in the next world, which is another deception.

One poem ironically praised Vladimir Lenin and compared him to religious leaders and prophets for similar contributions to the development and progress of Tajik people and Tajikistan. His poems criticizing religion caused a furor, especially among the religious, which has yet to settle down.

Sobir was also a proponent of bettering the standing of women in society, and for equality of the genders. When he was told a common saying in a form of a wish, such as "may your wife be always at your service", the poet would retort "What kind of a wish is that? Is my wife my slave to always be at my service?" He saw religion as a major contributing factor in the lower status of women in society, their limited freedom, submission of women to men, and their forced role as de facto servants. He penned multiple poems criticizing the role religion enforces on women, including the rhyming poem titled Entombed Alive, Women in Muslim Nations (Zani Khalki Musulmon Zindadargur):

No one fights with their enemies like Islam
fights with women from cradle to grave...
Women in Muslim nations, while alive are consigned to the grave,
When women die they deepen their grave.

Alas, Islam's poems lack love for women,
They are not situated to voice their opinion.
There are none like women so ill-fated,
Concealed life-long and black-fated.

After the 2015 murder of Farkhunda Malikzada, who was stoned to death over four hours and then incinerated at the center of Kabul, Afghanistan, for allegedly burning a copy of the Koran, Sobir wrote Nowruz became a Worldwide Holiday, but Not a Happy One (Idi Navruz Jahoni Shudu Farkhuna Nashud) about the incident:

The death of ill-fated Farkhunda forces me
To write at each door and wall with charcoal:
Death to Afghanistan! Prison of women!

If this is Islam in Afghanistan
All those bombs shelled by the Yankees on its head
Still are not enough.

=== Collections ===
- Link (Paivand) is the first collection of Sobir's poems. It was published by Irfon Publishing in 1971. 65 pages. His popularity rose steadily thereafter with each new publication of his work.
- Thorn-flower (Guli Khor) was published by Irfon Publishing in 1978. 126 pages.
- Nawruzi was published by Irfon Publishing in 1981. 175 pages.
- Eyelash of the Night (Mijgoni Shab) was published by Irfon in 1981. 173 pages.
- Sunflower(Oftobnihol) published in 1982.
- Flame of the Leaf (Otashi Barg) was published by Irfon Publishing in 1984. 140 pages.
- With Touch and with Taste (Bo Chamidan, Bo Chashidan) published by Adib in 1987. 205 pages.
- Eyes of Birch (Chashmi Safedor) was published by Tojikiston in 1991. 119 pages.
- Barbed Wire (Simkhor) is the first collection of poems published after his 1995 Moscow arrest by Transdornauka. 78 pages.
- From the "Thorn-flower" to the "Barbed Wire" (Az "Guli Hor" to "Simhor") was published a few years after he was released from prison, in Moscow in 1997 by Transdornauka. 255 pages.
- When I was Leaving Home (Az Vatan Vakte Ki Meraftam)
- The Family Has Been Scattered (Khonavoda Parokanda Shud) is an autobiographical collection of poems and prose dedicated to his youngest brother, a respected mathematician, who died at 35 in Voronezh, Russia. He has a school and a street named after him in Tajikistan. The book was published in 2000 in Moscow by Transdornauka. 125 pages.
- Fourstream (Chorchashm) 2001.
- If There is a Poet and a Poem (Shoiru Sheire Agar Hast...) was published by Adib in 2006. 324 pages.
- Blood of the Pen (Khuni Kalam) was published in 2010 by Shujoiyon.
- Black Tulip (Lolai Siyeh) was published in 2013 by Er-Graf.

=== Children's poems ===
Some years after his grandchild was born he began writing children's poems. He has published three collections of children's poems dedicated to his grandchildren:

- Twenty Little Poems for Little Ardasher (Bist Sherak Baroi Ardasherak) published in 2010.
- Bunches and Bunches for Anusha (Husha Husha Baroi Anusha) 2013.
- Grandma Grape's Garden (Bogi Momai Angur) 2015.

== Political life ==
Sobir became involved in politics in the 1980s. He was among the founders of the country's pro-democracy movement, and the Democratic Party. In 1990, he was elected as Senator in the Supreme Council of Tajikistan. He later voluntarily resigned his post, and remains the only politician to do so in Tajikistan's history. He resigned from his position as a deputy leader of the party after Islamic elements joined the movement.

Sobir was the first well-known literary figure to join the gatherings at the main square in Dushanbe, the capital, in what became months-long protests. When his political activism was criticized by poets and writers, who were of the opinion that politics was not suited for intellectuals, Sobir responded that poetry is always connected to politics.

The poetical is political. Political poems are the greatest literary product of literature. Shahnameh was a product of the Samanid's politics. Vladimir Mayakovsky's poems and stories are the greatest heritage of the October Revolution. Literature cannot be outside of the political times in which it originates. How can a writer, if s/he is a progressive person, how can he not have anything to do with politics? If he distances himself from politics, he is then not a modern person. The widespread saying, such as "I do not bother with politics," is nothing but foolishness and ignorance.

Sobir was one of the leading planners and orators in the protests. His support and push for independence and democracy, and as one of the leaders of the United Tajik Opposition (UTO) during the Tajikistani Civil War, led many of the known poets to write a collective letter, which was published and submitted to authorities, calling Sobir an extremist and requesting his arrest.

Sobir's first collection of poems, Simkhor (transl. Barbed Wire), published after his arrest, opens with:

"From all the poets, I was the only poet in prison,
Others poets were serving as guards."

He became known as the 'conscience of the nation'.

=== Arrest and trial ===
Sobir was one of the leaders of the opposition when the civil war erupted. On 26 March 1993, he was arrested at Dushanbe International Airport, where he had reportedly gone to send a parcel to his sons who were studying in Moscow. He was taken to an unmarked vehicle by unidentified people, who were later revealed to be procuracy officials. His arrest took place without a warrant, and it was only three days afterwards that an official warrant was issued.

On 5 April, Sobir was changed for attempting to take over the government, hostage-taking, and inciting social discord. An article which was found when investigators searched his house was taken as evidence for inciting social discord. Sobir denied the charges, calling them politically motivated. The hostage-taking charge related to an incident in April 1992 when Sobir, addressing the opposition demonstrators in Dushanbe, criticized a group of parliamentary deputies who were subsequently taken hostage that same day. A group of parliamentary guards sympathetic to the demonstrators had taken sixteen parliamentary deputies and two deputy ministers hostage, holding them until the following morning. The procuracy maintained that this act was a direct consequence of Sobir's comment.

Commenting on his detention, a university professor said of Sobir: "He was fighting for independence of Tajikistan. Now we celebrate independence and he sits in jail."

The trial opened in the Supreme Court of Tajikistan in Dushanbe on 20 September 1993, and proceedings were interrupted multiple times due to threats of violence against the defense lawyers. One of the lawyers, a Russian citizen from St. Petersburg, abandoned the trial and left the country after having been threatened. Dr Ayniddin Sadykov, a neurosurgeon and member of the Democratic Party, disappeared after being detained by armed men in Dushanbe on 21 April 1993. On the morning of his disappearance he had been carrying a medical report on Sobir, intending to present it to the authorities in an attempt to secure his release from prison.

The trial ended on 29 December 1993 when Sobir was found guilty on all three charges. However, Sobir was immediately released. Tajikistan president Emomali Rakhmonov had signed a decree pardoning Democratic Party leaders, ordering their release from jail. Specifically, the decree pardoned party chairman Shodmon Yusupov and his two deputies, poet Bozor Sobir, and Oinihol Bobonazarova. There had been international pressure for Sobir's release. Amnesty International stated that the criminal charges against Sobir were without reasonable foundation. Russian president Boris Yeltsin exerted political pressure after being contacted by the Writers' Union of Russia, who themselves had been contacted by Sobir's wife. Rakhmonov ordered the criminal cases closed and exempted Sobir from his suspended sentence of two years. Sobir had been under arrest for nine months and nine days.

The Tajik authorities said that they presented the pardon of the three opposition leaders as a goodwill gesture to facilitate the resumption of the fifth round of inter-Tajik negotiations. The negotiations had opened in Ashgabat, Turkmenistan, on 30 November 1995, but were suspended on multiple occasions amid persisting differences.

=== Exile ===
Following his 29 December 1993 release, Sobir was strongly advised to leave the country. He left Tajikistan for Moscow, Russia. The Norwegian Author's Union invited Sobir to attend the Freedom of Expression symposium focusing on seven writers who had been jailed or exiled, including Salman Rushdie and Bozor Sobir.

In 1995, Sobir moved his family to the United States, where he worked at the University of Washington in Seattle, Washington, teaching Tajik in the Department of Near Eastern Languages and Civilization. Sobir had a connection to the university since 1991, when he gave lectures and poetry readings. By 1996, there was a course which studied his work, "Introducing the Tajik Poets Bozor Sobir and Gulrohsar Safiyeva".

=== Post-exile political influence ===
A strong proponent of secularism, Sobir's views, poems and articles continued to influence politics and policy, and he remained popular despite his exile.

In 2011, almost all of the country's newspapers, including national, regional and district newspapers carried excerpts from an interview with Sobir. In this, Sobir recommended that the authorities limit the Islamization of Tajikistan and dismantle the Islamic Renaissance Party of Tajikistan (IRPT) – the only Islamic party in Central Asia – stating that if it ever came to power it would reduce the country to a feudal state. This provoked a round-table discussion on the weekly Millat in Dushanbe on 4 March 2011. The IRPT was subsequently banned.

Solidifying his secularist view in defense of closing the Islamic party, Sobir said that "many unnecessary demagogues have emerged in Tajikistan, which must give way to sober-minded forces". Following the publication of the statement, the IRPT invited Sobir to discuss matters at a joint conference, which he declined:

What is my business with Islamists? I will not go. What will I talk about with the Islamists? They are mullahs, I am a poet. We have nothing in common.

Sobir likewise saw value in keeping the Cyrillic alphabet and was against adopting the Arabic alphabet, stating that Russians and Tajiks are strongly linked by history and lineage. In a documentary about Yesenin, Sobir reaffirmed the idea of close roots linking the Russian and Tajik peoples. Though the government had focused on promoting Tajik by limiting the use of Russian, it has since made efforts to promote Russian in public schools.

== Reception ==
Many of Sobir's poems have been set to music by Tajik composers, and are played on Tajik TV channels on an almost daily basis. His patriotic verses in We are of Siyovushe's Bloodline (Tajik: Az Khuni Siyovushem), which traces the Tajik lineage to Zoroaster, and sees Siyâvash, Ismail Samani and Ferdowsi as its heroic predecessors, has become the de facto national anthem since it was set to music. Other popular poems set to music by renowned Tajik composers include To Build You the Second Time, Homeland (Dubora Sozamat Vatan), Why Don't You Come? (Charo Nameoi?), Alovparak (Jumping Over Fire), Mother (Modar), Clothed Cherries (Olichai Lattador), and Mother Tongue (Zaboni Modari). CDs of this music have been released, and his works continue to have popularity over his contemporaries.

During the Soviet era, Sobir's patriotic and nationalistic poems were a source of much discussion and controversy, and the subsequent poems throughout his life have maintained that effect on the people and the government. His poems, which promoted the new Tajik identity, and his work in popularizing the old traditions of the Tajik people, like the celebration of Nowruz (Persian New Year), faced some resistance in the Soviet era.

His anti-government poem at that time was cited as one reason for his arrest, in particular of "promoting social discord". His secularist views and criticism of religion continue to stir people in a Muslim-majority Tajikistan and also in Iran and Afghanistan, where Tajik language and culture are practised. The self-identified atheist is viewed by some as a heretic and an infidel. A member of the Islamic State was arrested for planning Sobir's murder in 2016.

Afghan Ambassador to Tajikistan Abdulgafur Orzu called Nowruz became a Worldwide Holiday, but Not a Happy One an insult to Afghans and Sobir an extremist. Sobir agreed to the former, stating that those of Kabul were either participants or bystanders to the brutal murder. Sobir and the poem were labeled anti-Islamic.

=== Death threats ===
Although Sobir denied receiving direct personal death threats, the government authorities released a statement that a 26-year old Tajik national "admitted in court that had planned to murder the poet in order to gain the trust of an Islamic State commander", who had encouraged him to kill all those who had abandoned Islam. The man was sentenced to 13 years in prison.

== Return to Tajikistan ==
In 2013, President of Tajikistan Emomali Rahmon formally invited Sobir to return to Tajikistan. Sobir agreed and was met in Dushanbe Airport by government officials. His arrival and a meeting with the president at the Palace of Nations on 30 May 2013 were televised internationally by MIR24, the channel encompassing all former Soviet bloc countries. During the meeting, Rahmon said: "We have always remembered you and remember, that this is not the first time we had invite you to our Motherland." Rahmon and Sobir also had joint trips and informal conversations in Tajikistan.

In September 2013, Bozor Sobir was granted the order Star of the President 3rd degree.

== Death ==
In December 2016, Sobir returned to the US for what was supposed to be a short trip to visit his children and grandchildren. He was hospitalized in April 2018. In a televised announcement, Rahmon ordered the country's US and UN representatives to see that Sobir was visited and "to assist in ensuring his intensive care, comprehensive support and early return of the poet to his homeland". Sobir died on 1 May 2018. Rahmon issued his official condolences, stating:

Bozor Sobir was one of the most patriotic poets who made great efforts in cultivating a sense of national identity and national pride. All the creativity of the Bozor Sobir, especially the poetry of the independence period, is permeated with the ideas of patriotism and national identity. The highly artistic and inimitable words of the national poet Bozor Sobir will forever remain in the memory of present and future generations.

Sobir's body was transported with full state honors to his homeland and buried in Dushanbe. His burial is in the Luchob Cemetery, with other public figures of Tajikistan.

== Family ==
Bozor Sobir and his wife married two months after they met. They have three sons and one daughter, as well as four grandchildren.
