= Varzob District =

Varzob District Russian: Варзобский район Tajik: Ноҳияи Варзоб
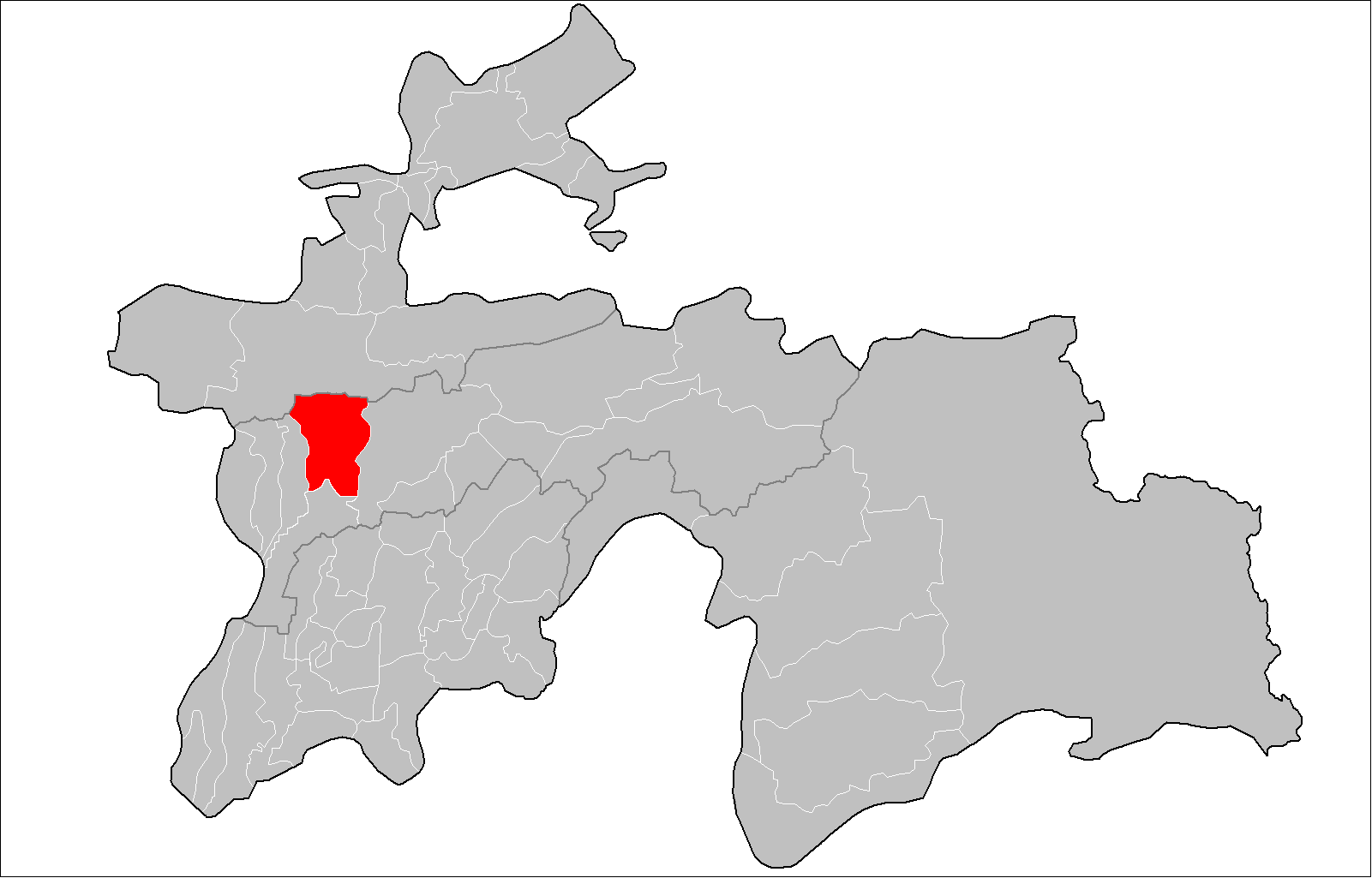
- Location of the district in Tajikistan
- Coordinates: 38°50′N 68°50′E
- Country: Tajikistan
- Region: Districts of Republican Subordination
- Capital: Varzob

Area
  - Total: 1,700 km^{2} (660 sq mi)

Population (2020)
  - Total: 82,200
  - Density: 48/km^{2} (130/sq mi)
- Time zone: UTC+5
- Official languages: Russian (Interethnic); Tajik (State) (Note: Constitution of Tajikistan)
- Website: varzob.tj

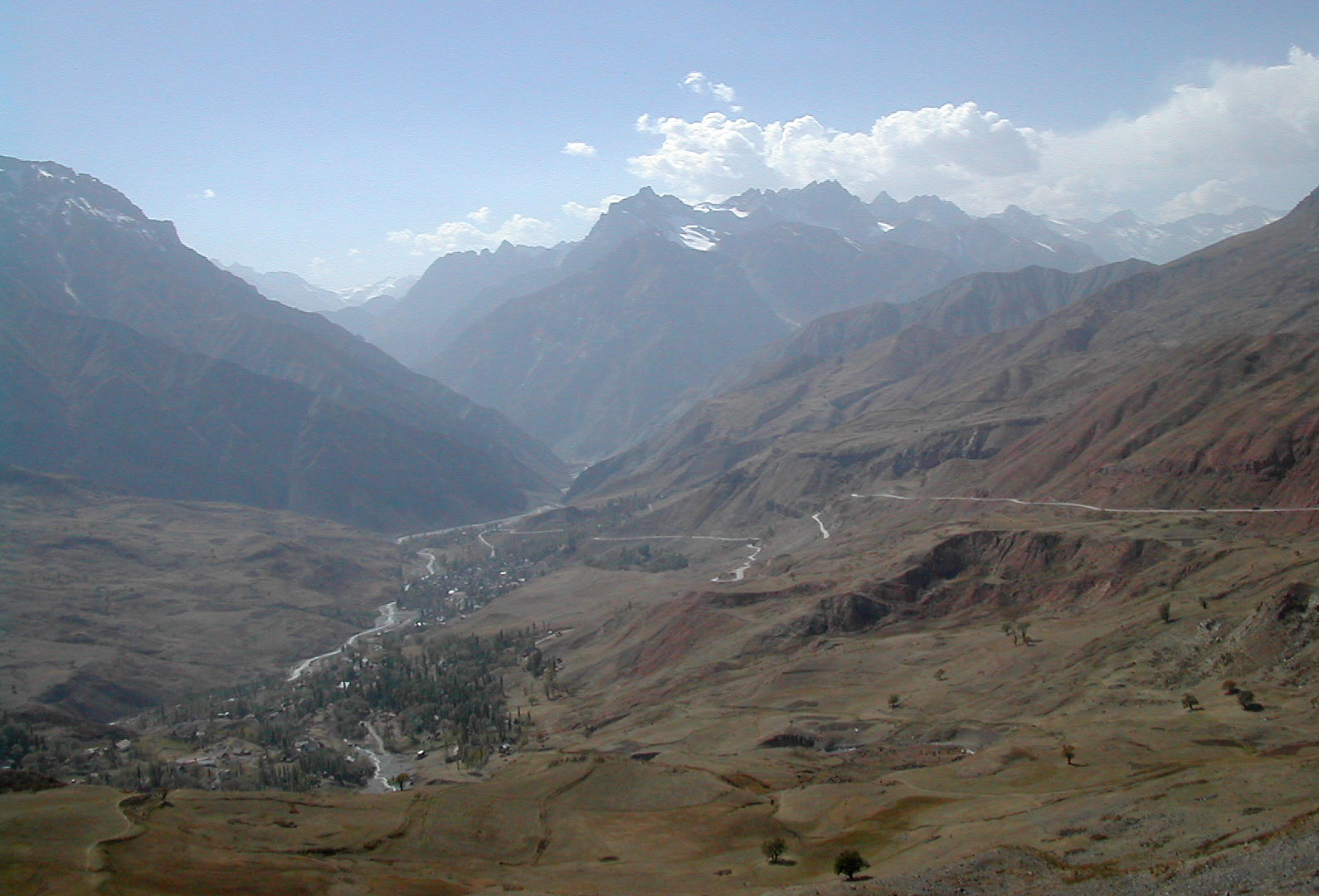
M34 highway

Varzob District (Russian: Варзобский район; Tajik: Ноҳияи Варзоб, romanized: Nohiyayi Varzob) is a district in Tajikistan, lying north of Dushanbe. It is one of the Districts of Republican Subordination. It borders on the city of Hisor from the west, Rudaki District from the south, and the city of Vahdat from the east. The Gissar Range runs along its northern edge. The river Varzob traverses the entire district north to south. The district capital is the village Varzob. The population of the district is 82,200 (January 2020 estimate).

Beside the river, grows a native species of Iris vicaria, and Iris hoogiana.

== Administrative divisions ==
The district has an area of about 1,700 km^{2} (700 sq mi) and is divided administratively into one town and six jamoats. They are as follows:

Jamoat	Population (Jan. 2015)
Takob (town)	2,400
Ayni	14,052
Chorbogh	31,585
Dehmalik	8,034
Luchob	7,174
Varzobqala	11,438
Zideh	7,219
