= Ordzhonikidzeabad =

Ordzhonikidzeabad is a place named after Georgian communist Grigoriy Ordzhonikidze. Ordzhonikidzeabad may refer to:

- Vahdat, a city in Tajikistan that from 1936 to 1992 was named Ordzhonikidzeabad.
- Vahdat District, a district in Tajikistan that was formerly named Ordzhonikidzeabad district.
