= Roghun District =

Coordinates: 38°36′5″N 69°39′4″E

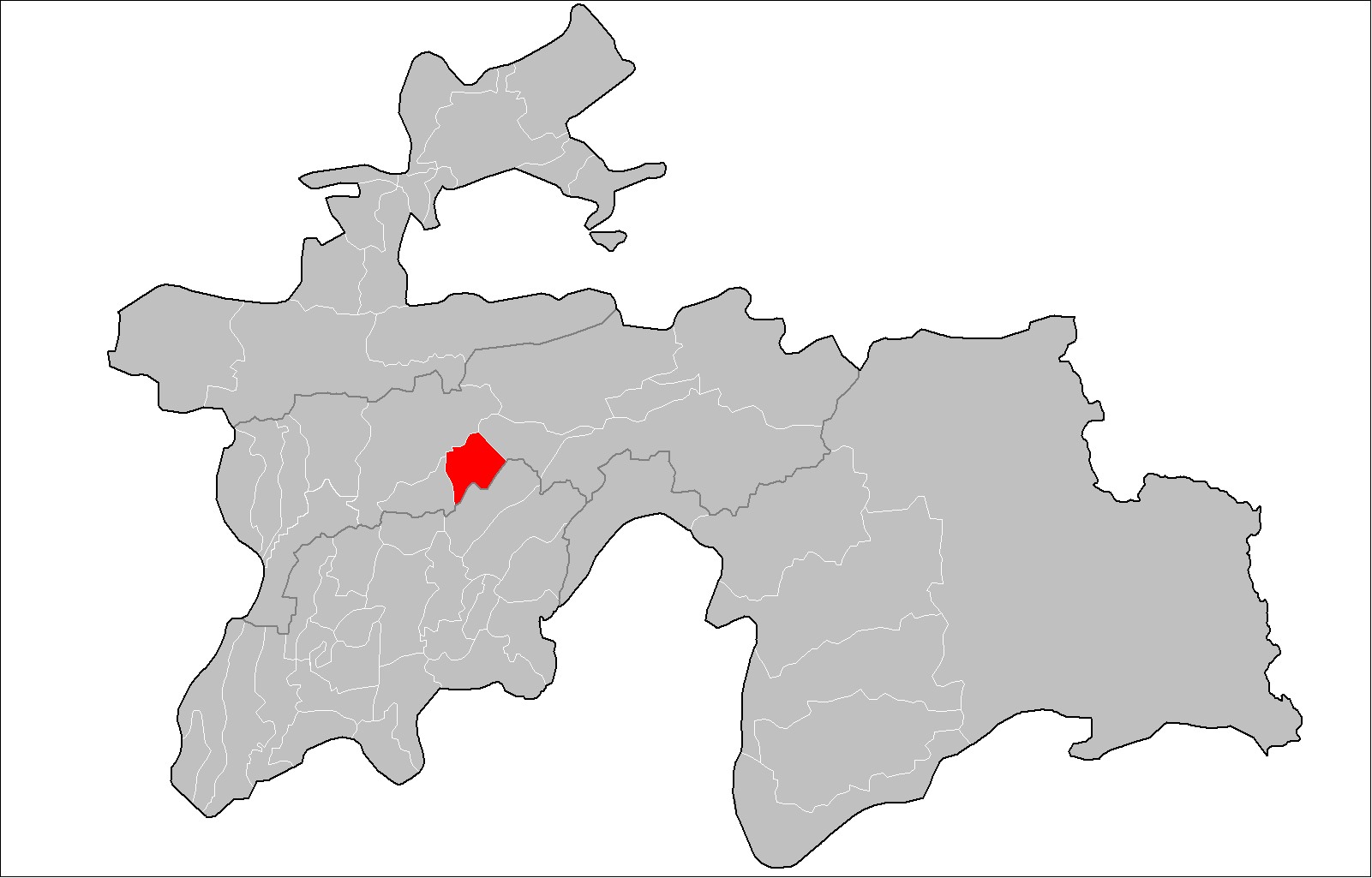
Location in Tajikistan

Roghun District (Russian: Рогунский район) or Nohiyai Roghun (Tajik: Ноҳияи Роғун) is a former district in the Districts of Republican Subordination in Tajikistan, bordering on Faizobod District from the west, the Vahdat District from the north-west, and the Nurobod District from the north-east. Its southeastern border was with the Khatlon Region, running along the Vakhsh Range. Its capital was Roghun. Around 2018, the district was merged into the city of Roghun.

== Administrative divisions ==
The district was divided administratively into jamoats. They were as follows (and population).

Jamoats of Roghun District
Jamoat	Population
Qadiob	9011
Sicharog	
