= Dushanbe Stadium =

Football stadium in Tajikistan

National Stadium of Tajikistan
- Interactive map of National Stadium of Tajikistan
- Location: Dushanbe, Tajikistan
- Coordinates: 38°35′12″N 68°46′29″E
- Owner: Executive Office of the President of the Republic of Tajikistan
- Seating type: All-seater
- Capacity: 30,000
- Surface: Grass
- Scoreboard: Yes

Construction
- Groundbreaking: 15 March 2019
- Built: 2019–2026
- Opened: 21 August 2026; 0 days' time
- General contractor: PFM Stone

Tenant
- Tajikistan national football team (2026–present))

The National Stadium of Tajikistan (Tajik: Варзишгоҳи миллии Тоҷикистон) is a football stadium in Dushanbe, Tajikistan. Owned by the Executive Office of the President of the Republic of Tajikistan, it is the largest stadium in Tajikistan by 30,000 seats capacity. Intended as a replacement for the Tajikistan national football team's current stadium, Dushanbe Republican Central Stadium.

== History ==
The construction of the stadium began on 15 March 2019. The stadium is being built on a site of over 9 hectares, located in front of the main building of Tajik National University.

The stadium will be built on an area of more than 9 hectares (22 acres) with modern conditions for various sports and cultural events. The area of the football field will be 105 by 68 metres (344 ft × 223 ft). The stadium will consist of four stands, which will be placed on two tiers.

The construction of auxiliary facilities, such as an elevator, an electrical substation, a fire extinguishing pool and parking for 2,000 cars, is planned on the stadium territory. For guests it is planned to build separate rooms with a total of 448 places, walkways at a height of more than 9 metres (30 ft) and other supporting facilities. The stadium will feature 72 broadcast recording devices for capturing sports events. Lighting for the area and rest zones will be provided by 312 specialized lamps.

The National Stadium will feature a modern exterior design with aluminum panels symbolizing water waves, along with contemporary fountains surrounding the venue. Additionally, two bridges will be built over the Varzob and Luchob rivers to facilitate fan movement, transforming the area into a modern sports complex.

At the end of 2024, the construction was resumed. The construction is being carried out by the Chinese company PFM Stone.

As of May 2025, major reinforced concrete structures around the stadium have been completed. Work is actively progressing on the west and north stands, where two tiers have already been built. Next, efforts will shift to constructing the east and south stands.

On June 3, President Emomali Rahmon and Mayor Rustam Emomali visited the construction site of the stadium. As of June 2025, work at the National Stadium of Tajikistan included ground leveling, installation of steel structures, laying of electrical and internet cables, water lines, heating systems, air filtration units, interior finishing, tiling, and more. A team of 725 specialists and workers is involved in the daily construction, following the project plan.

In March 2026, the main part of the construction work was completed, workers were installing stands and low-current cables.

On August 21, 2026, the President of Tajikistan Emomali Rahmon and the Mayor of Dushanbe Rustam Emomali opened the National Stadium.

== Structure and facilities ==
The stadium complex occupies an area of 9.5 hectares (23 acres), with a building footprint of 27,000 square metres (290,000 sq ft) and a total floor area of over 42,000 square metres (450,000 sq ft). The five-storey structure stands at a height of 33 metres (108 ft) and includes a basement level.

The main facade is clad in aluminum panels and features a 30,000-square-metre (320,000 sq ft) media projection system designed for graphics and light displays. Outside the main entrance, a stainless-steel fountain art object is installed.

The stadium features a two-tiered seating arrangement accommodating over 30,000 spectators (over 12,000 on the lower level and 18,000 on the upper level). Entry is regulated via 68 electronic turnstiles divided across four operational sectors. Premium seating facilities include:

- 1 VVIP lounge (32 seats)
- 34 VIP suites (306 seats)
- 26 CIP suites (416 seats)

== Pitch and specifications ==
The football pitch measures 105 by 68 metres (115 yd × 74 yd), occupying a central area of 7,140 square metres (76,850 sq ft). The overall sports field footprint, including safety and technical zones, spans 130 by 87 metres (142 yd × 95 yd). Player facilities include four changing rooms accommodating up to 104 individuals.

=== Technology and equipment ===
- Lighting: 312 Philips floodlights engineered for HD/4K broadcasting, supplemented by 66 specialized light fixtures for ceremonies and event effects.
- Audio: An acoustic system equipped with 88 professional loudspeakers.
- Displays: Two LED screens, each measuring 133 square metres (1,430 sq ft).
- Security and safety: 50 specialized CCTV cameras, 10 broadcast cameras, and over 1,000 intelligent fire alarms.

== Transport ==
The facility includes an on-site parking area accommodating over 750 vehicles.
