= Simiganj (river) =

Location
- Country: Tajikistan

Physical characteristics
- Source: Gissar Range
  - coordinates: 38.7839°N 69.0044°E
- Mouth: Kofarnihon
  - coordinates: 38°34′07″N 69°01′07″E
- Length: 27 km (17 mi)

Basin features
- Progression: Kofarnihon→ Amu Darya→ Aral Sea

The Simiganj (Tajik: Симиганҷ, Russian: Симиганч Simiganch) is a short, 27 km, river in western Tajikistan, central Asia.

It rises from an elevation of about 3000 meters on the southwestern slopes of a mountain in the Gissar Range, flows past the town of Simiganj and enters the Kofarnihon River at the city of Vahdat.
