= Fazliddin Muhammadiev =

- Born: 15 June 1928; Samarkand, Uzbek SSR, USSR
- Died: 6 October 1986 (aged 58); Dushanbe, Tajik SSR, USSR
- Citizenship: USSR
- Occupation(s): writer, novelist, journalist, playwright
- Website: http://lib.ru/EMIGRATION/tomekka.txt

Fazliddin Muhammadiev (15 June 1928, Samarkand - 16 October 1986, Dushanbe) was a Soviet prose writer and film playwright. People's writer of the Tajik SSR (1986). Honored Worker of Culture of the Tajik SSR. Member of the board of the Union of Writers of the USSR. Member of the Presidium of the board of the Union of Writers of Tajikistan. Member of the Union of Cinematographers of the Tajik SSR. Member of the CPSU since 1951. Member of the Union of Writers of the USSR since 1957.

== Biography ==
He was born in 1928, in one of Central Asia's most ancient cultural centers - the city of Samarkand, in the family of a worker-binder.

In 1962, he graduated from the Higher Literature Courses at the Gorky Literary Institute in Moscow. Gorky Literary Institute in Moscow.

He edited the satirical magazine "Khorpushtak" ("Hedgehog"), was a member of the script board of the film studio "Tajikfilm", senior editor of the publishing house "Irfon", senior scientific editor and head of the editorial board of the Main Editorial Office of the Tajik Soviet Encyclopedia, chief editor of the State Cinema of the Tajik SSR. In 1978 he was elected secretary of the board of the Union of Writers of Tajikistan.

In June 1986, almost in the center of the Tajik capital, Dushanbe, Fazliddin Muhammadiev was attacked by a group of unknown men, as a result of which, having received numerous stab wounds, the writer was taken to hospital in serious condition. Shortly after the hastily held trial, clearly patronizing the criminals, died.

He was buried at the Luchob cemetery in Dushanbe.
