= Ayni, Tajikistan =

Ayni is the name of two locations in Tajikistan:

- Ayni, Ayni District, the capital of Ayni District in Sughd Province
- Ayni, Varzob District, a jamoat in Varzob District in Districts of Republican Subordination Province
