= Temur Sabirov =

Soviet mathematician and physicist

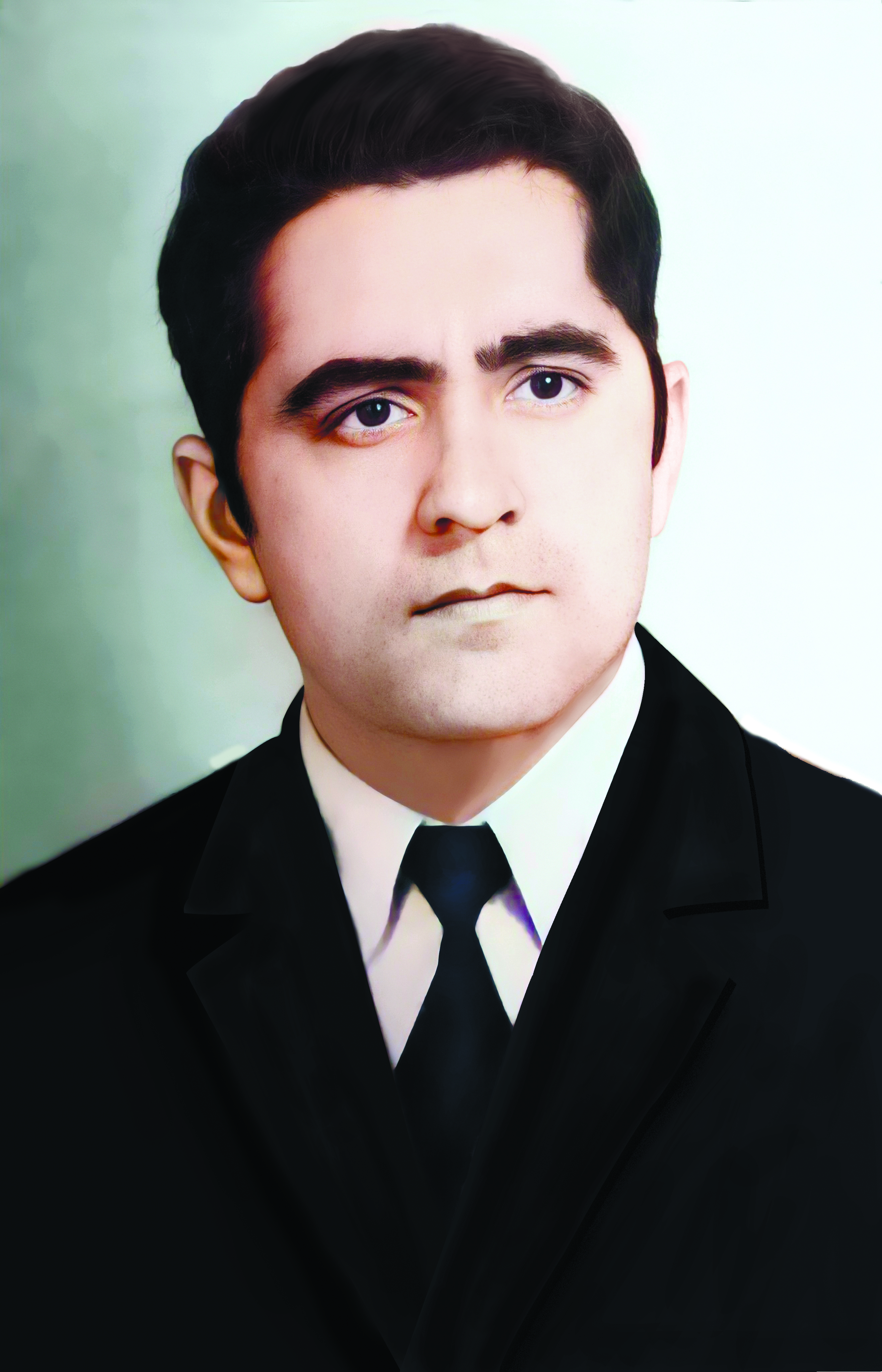
- Sobirov
- Born: Temur Sobirov; 3 April 1940; Sifiyen, Tajikistan
- Died: 23 June 1977 (aged 37); Voronezh, Russia, Soviet Union
- Resting place: Vahdat, Tajikistan
- Education: Voronezh State University

Temur Sabirov was a Soviet and Tajik Doctor of Physics and Mathematics.

== Life ==
Temur Sabirov was born on 3 April 1940 in Sufiyen, Tajikistan. He was the third youngest of six children. After his father died at an early age, he was sent to study at a boarding school. Sabirov's father was a government tax collector. His mother was a housewife. His siblings and relatives are also highly respected and have been involved in politics. His older brother is Bozor Sobir, Tajikistan's most well-known and preeminent poet, and politician. His older brother was also a mathematician and ran for a Senate seat. His nephew, also a mathematician, was the head of a Democratic Party in Tajikistan until his resignation in 2000s. His other siblings went into teaching.

== Scientific career ==
He completed his doctorate in Voronezh, Russia. He was a student of Mark Krasnosel'skii, who was a Soviet, Russian and Ukrainian mathematician renowned for his work on nonlinear functional analysis and its applications. Temur Sobirov was a professor in Voronezh State University in Russia. His field of research was the theory of ordinary differential equations. His works have been published in Soviet as well as European and American mathematical and physics journals. He has published over 60 scientific articles. He has made a big contribution in the education of young scientists of Tajikistan.

== Distinctions ==
A government primary school as well as a street is named after him in Tajikistan.

== Family ==
He met his wife Nina while studying in Voronezh. He has one son Arthur Sobirov, who at the time of Sobirov's teaching at Voronezh State University attended the Suvorov Military School.

== Death ==
After an acute illness Sabirov died on June 23, 1977, at the age of 37 in Voronezh, but his body was transported to his birthplace near Orzhenikidzebad, now Vahdat, Tajikistan.
