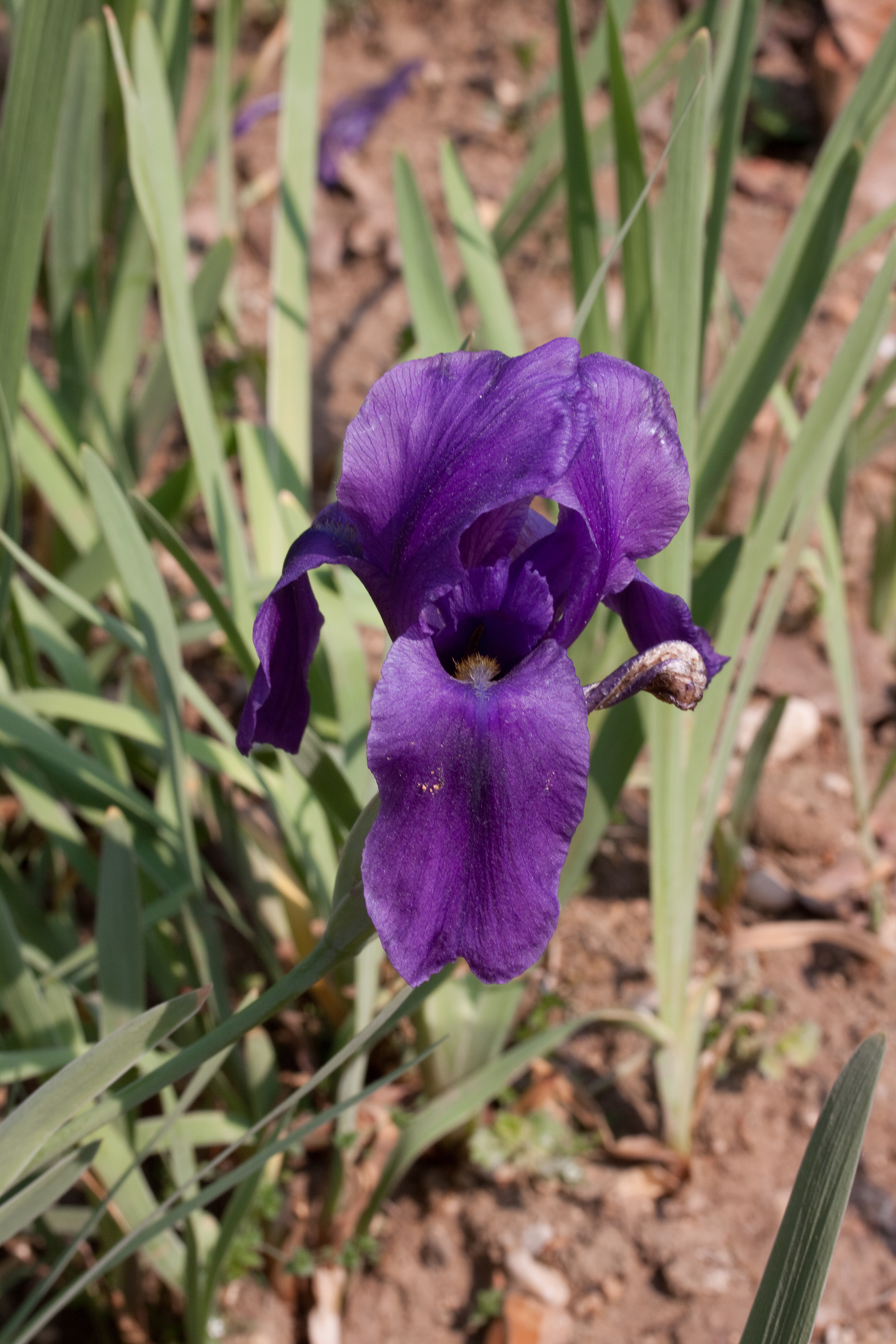
- Seen in Jardin des Plantes in Paris

Scientific classification
- Kingdom: Plantae
- Clade: Tracheophytes
- Clade: Angiosperms
- Clade: Monocots
- Order: Asparagales
- Family: Iridaceae
- Genus: Iris
- Subgenus: Iris subg. Iris
- Section: Iris sect. Regelia
- Species: I. hoogiana

Binomial name
- Iris hoogiana Dykes

Synonyms
- Iris splendens O.Fedtsch.

= Iris hoogiana =

Species of flowering plant

Iris hoogiana is a plant species in the genus Iris, it is also in the subgenus Iris and in the section Regelia. It is a rhizomatous perennial, from the grassy mountainsides of Turkestan. It has long green leaves, which are slightly purple at the base, and a long slender flowering stem. The flowers are blue, ranging from sky-blue to lavender blue and blue purple. It has orange or yellow beards. It is cultivated as an ornamental plant in temperate regions.

== Description ==
Iris hoogiana has a stout, or thick rhizome that produces many long, slender, fleshy secondary stolons, which travel through the ground searching for minerals to feed the plant. They can be between 40–80 cm (16–31 in) long. It also uses the stolons to form colonies of plants and spread over an area. When the plant is dormant (in autumn and winter), it is very similar in form to Iris stolonifera.

It has glaucous green, or mid green, or bright green leaves. That have a slight tinge of (or are stained,) purple at the base of the leaf. They are sword-shaped, or ensate, and slightly curved. They can grow up to between 35–50 cm (14–20 in) long, and between 1–2 cm wide. The leaves begin to fade and die after, the plant has flowered.

It has stems that can grow up to between 40–60 cm (16–24 in) tall. They are normally taller than the foliage, and can also have a slight purple tinge.

The stem has green spathes or bracts (leaves of the flower bud), that are 4.5–8.9 cm (2–4 in) long and 2 cm wide. They have a membranous margin, which is tinged with purple, or red.

The unbranched, stems hold 2 or 3 terminal (top of stem) flowers, blooming late spring, or early summer, between April and May, or between May and June. In the United States, it flowers in mid to southern states between early April to early May and it also flowers in mid to northern states between late April to early June.

The scented flowers, are 7–10 cm (3–4 in) in diameter. They come in shades of blue, from sky-blue, mid-blue, grey-blue, lilac-blue, lavender, to blue-purple, or lilac violet. There is occasionally a white, or very pale blue form. But they are not very vigorous and poorly lived.

It has 2 pairs of petals, 3 large sepals (outer petals), known as the 'falls' and 3 inner, smaller petals (or tepals), known as the 'standards'. The pendant shaped falls are 7.5 cm (3 in) long, and 3 cm wide. They are wide on the haft (the bend of the petal), and then becomes thinner along the blade (the tip of the petal). They have a dense, orange, golden yellow, or yellow beard. The beard is longer than Iris korolkowii's beard. The obovate shaped, standards are 7.5 cm (3 in) long,. They widen gradually to from haft to a rounded apex.

It has a 2.5 cm long perianth tube, which is green with a purple tinge. It has short pedicels (flower stalks), and oblong shaped styles, which are 2.5 cm long, and similar in colour to the flower petals. It has semi-ovate, or triangular crests, and long anthers, with white, or cream coloured pollen. It has an oblong, 2.5 cm long ovary.

After the iris has flowered, in May, it produces a long and narrow seed capsule, which is pointed at the tip. It dehisced (splits open) laterally (side to side). Inside are pyriform (pear shaped), brown seeds. They are rugulose and have a white aril (appendage).

=== Biochemistry ===
In 1960, a study was carried out on a hybrid form between Iris hoogiana and Iris chamaeiris alba (now classified as a synonym of Iris lutescens). It compared chromosomal counts of the irises and hybrids. Iris hoogiana had a count of 2n=44 and the other iris had a count of 2n=40, the hybrid had a count of 2n=84.

In 2001, a chemical extraction study was carried out on the rhizomes of Iris hoogiana. It found a new iridal called 'Hoogianal'.

As most irises are diploid, having two sets of chromosomes, this can be used to identify hybrids and classification of groupings. It has a chromosome count: 2n = 44.

== Taxonomy ==
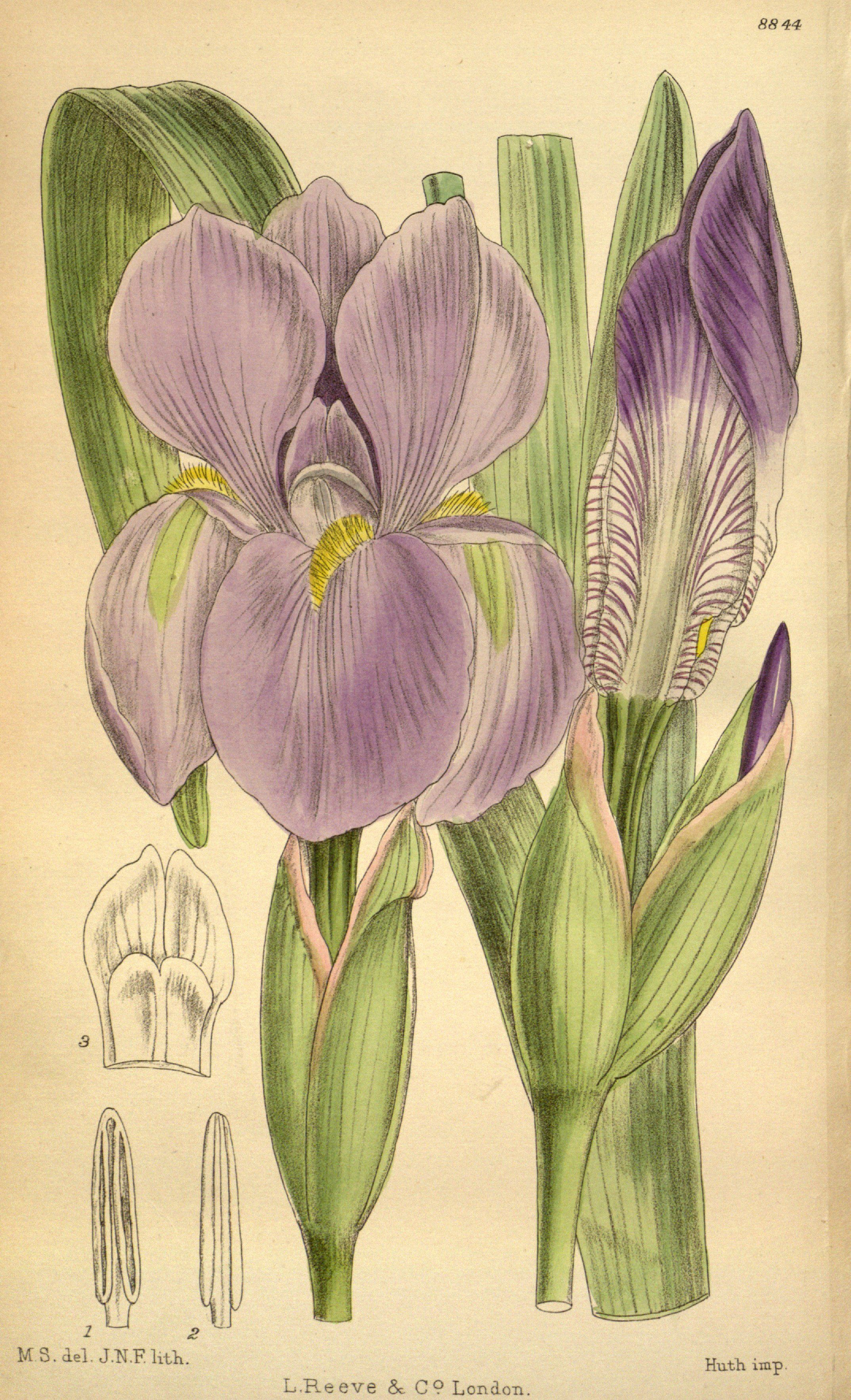
Curtis's Botanical Magazine, London, vol. 146 (Series. 4, vol. 16) Tab. 8844 in 1920

It has the common names of 'Aril iris', 'regelia iris', or 'Redbeard Iris'.

It is known as 'sideniris' or 'sideiris' (in Sweden).

The Latin specific epithet hoogiana refers to the Dutch nursery men, 'Hoog'. Hoog, was one of 2 brothers, who manage the bulb nursery of 'Van Tubergen', based in Haarlem. They were the nephews of the nursery founder, Cornelis Gerrit van Tubergen (1844–1919).

The iris was discovered in Southern Turkestan in 1913 by Paul Graeber, (a collector for the van Tubergen nursery, later honored with Iris graeberiana) and then the rhizomes were sent to the nursery.

It was first published and described by William Rickatson Dykes in The Gardeners' Chronicle (Gard. Chron. ) Series 3 Issue 60, page 216 on 4 November 1916.

Dykes had noticed the similarity of Iris hoogiana to Iris korolkowii and Iris stolonifera and therefore it was a member of the Regalia section.

It was then published in Gardeners' Chronicle, in Series 1, page 277 in 1919, and then with an illustration in Curtis's Botanical Magazine 146 in 1920,

In 1924, Olga Fedtschenko (a Russian botanist) published and described Iris splendens in the 'Bull. Jard. Bot. Princ.' 23., which is now listed as a synonym of Iris hoogiana.

It was verified by United States Department of Agriculture and the Agricultural Research Service on 2 October 2014.

Iris hoogiana is an accepted name by the RHS.

It was given the RHS Award of Garden Merit in 1994.

== Distribution and habitat ==
It is native to temperate central Asia.

=== Range ===
It is found in the former USSR republic, of Turkestan, Tajikistan, and Uzbekistan

One source also mentions Kazakhstan.

The iris is located within the Pamir Alay mountains, and Varzob River valley in Dushanbe, of Tajikistan.

=== Habitat ===
It grows on the well-drained grassy slopes of mountains. They can be found at altitudes of up to 1,800 metres (5,900 ft) above sea level.

== Cultivation ==
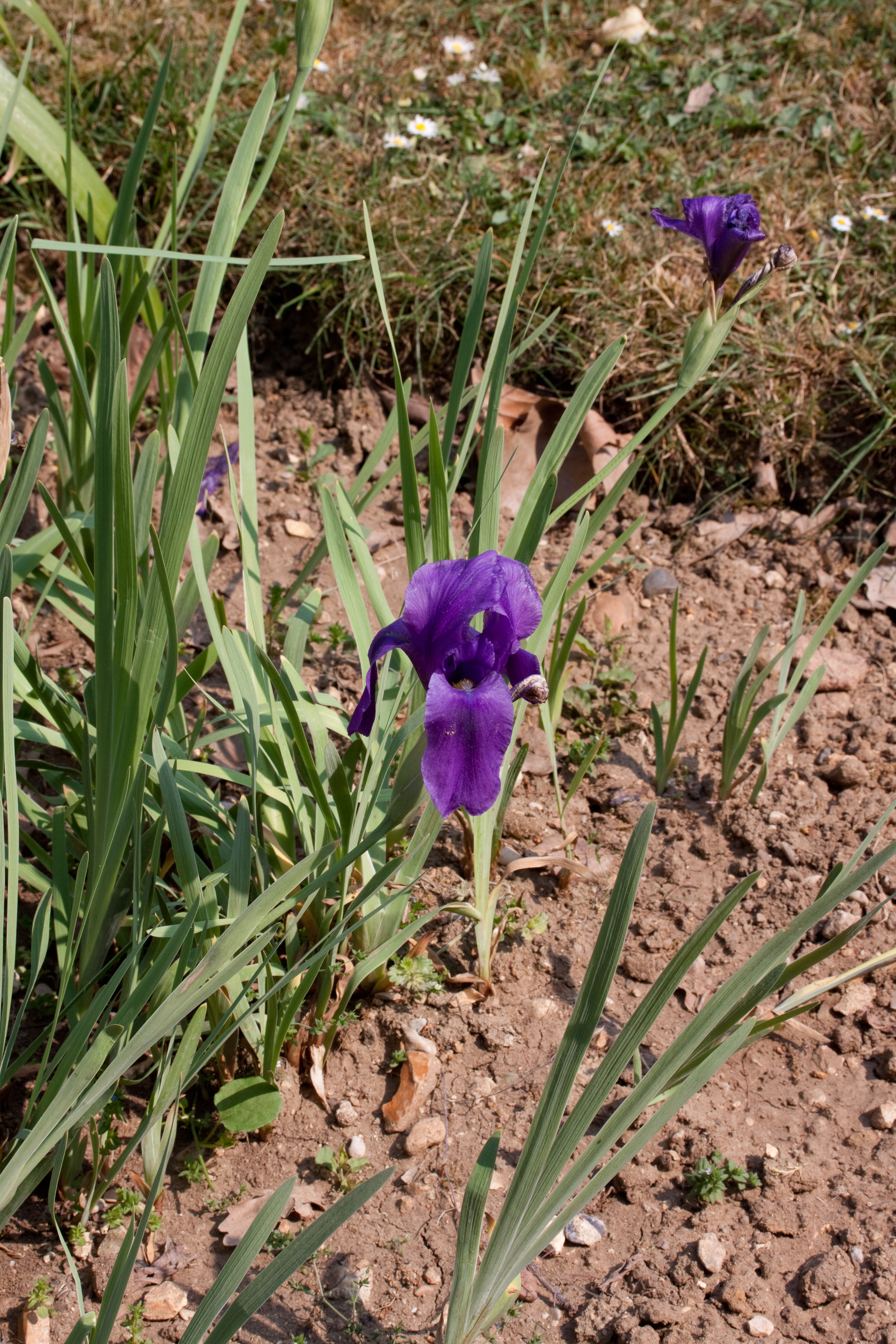
Seen in the Jardin des Plantes in Paris

Iris hoogiana is described as being easy to grow and cultivate in the UK.

It is hardy to between USDA Zone 3 and Zone 8, including Zone 5. One source, mentions between Zones 2 to 9. It is also hardy to Zone H3 in Europe, including the UK, if the iris position is sheltered. in a dry sheltered bed beside a wall. Such as in Kew Gardens. It is hardy in parts of USSR, including regions around Leningrad, although it still prefers the shelter of shrubs or trees. It could be thought as half-hardy in cold regions. and may need shelter during the winter.

It prefers to grow in very well-drained soils. It can tolerate sandy or clay soils. It can tolerate a pH level between 5 and 7.5.

It prefers positions in full sun. But can tolerate part shade.

It needs a period of dryness during summer, creating a summer dormancy period. When the leaves disappear until the next spring. If the plants are long exposed to moisture they are prone to viral diseases.

The iris is intolerant of winds, which can dry out the plants.

It can be grown in rockeries, or a raised bed.

In his garden in Surrey, William Dykes had up to 100 specimens of Iris hoogiana, in open-sided frames.

The rhizome should be planted at a depth of 2 inches, to protect against winds, in October.

=== Hybrids and cultivars ===
Several cultivars have been breed, as well as several hybrids, which have normally been hybridized with Iris stolonifera.

Known Iris hoogiana cultivars include:

- 'Alba', (which has white flowers overlaid with a pale-lavender blue, and can grow up to 6ocm high,)
- 'Alpheus',
- 'Antiope', (it was named after Antiope, queen of the Amazons, by Antoine Hoog in May 1999, it has large cream flowers that have a touch of blue as well, and can grow up to 35 cm tall,)
- 'Amphion',
- 'Blue Joy',
- 'Blue Princess',(created in 1946)
- 'Bronze Beauty', (which has pale purple standards and deep violet falls, but also has hints of bronze, it can grow up to 28 inches tall,)
- 'Ice Bowl',
- 'Late Amethyst',
- 'Mountain Pottery',(created in 1946)
- 'New Era',(created in 1946)
- 'Noblesse',
- 'Party Robe',(created in 1946)
- 'Purple Dawn',(the flowers are a mixture of lavender, lilac, violet, and pale rose, which also has a yellow beard),
- 'Purpurea',
- 'Spotless',(created in 1938)
- 'Spring Caper',(created in 1949)
- 'Tweet' (which can grow up to 50 cm tall).

== Toxicity ==
Like many other irises, most parts of the plant are poisonous (rhizome and leaves), and if mistakenly ingested can cause stomach pains and vomiting. Handling the plant may cause skin irritation or an allergic reaction.

== Sources ==
- Aldén, B., S. Ryman & M. Hjertson. 2009. Våra kulturväxters namn – ursprung och användning. Formas, Stockholm (Handbook on Swedish cultivated and utility plants, their names and origin).
- Czerepanov, S. K. 1995. Vascular plants of Russia and adjacent states (the former USSR).
- Huxley, A., ed. 1992. The new Royal Horticultural Society dictionary of gardening.
- Khassanov, F. O. & N. Rakhimova. 2012. Taxonomic revision of the genus Iris L. (Iridaceae Juss.) for the flora of Central Asia. Stapfia 97:177.
- Komarov, V. L. et al., eds. 1934–1964. Flora SSSR.
- Mathew, B. 1981. The Iris. 62–63.
