= Khanaka (river) =

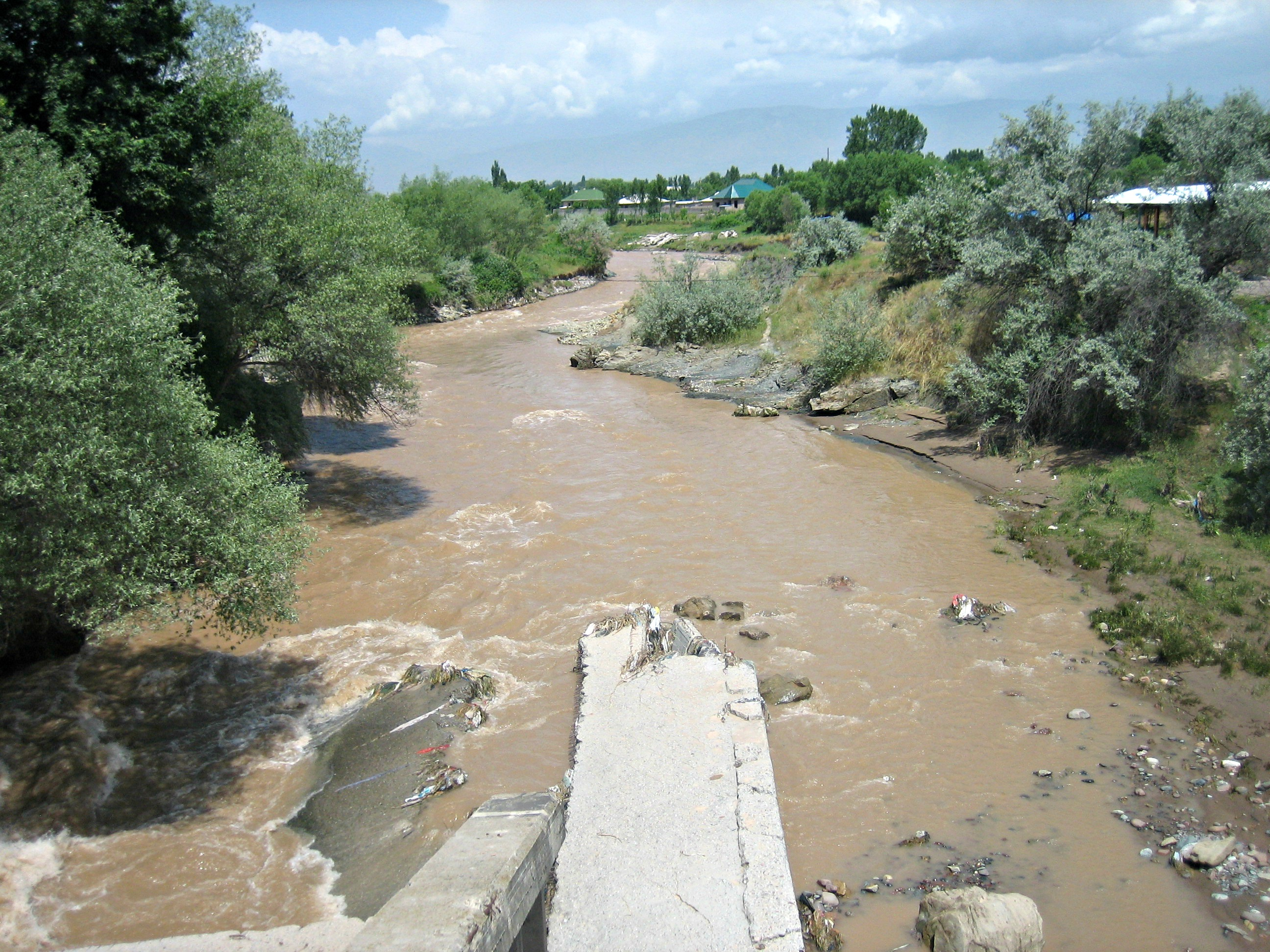

Location
- Country: Tajikistan

Physical characteristics
- Mouth: Kofarnihon
  - coordinates: 38.4425°N 68.5923°E

Basin features
- Progression: Kofarnihon→ Amu Darya→ Aral Sea

The Khanaka (Russian: Ханака, Tajik: Хонақоҳ Khonaqoh) is a river of western Tajikistan. A right tributary of the Kofarnihon, it passes through the town of Hisor.
