= Obigarm =

Obigarm Обигарм
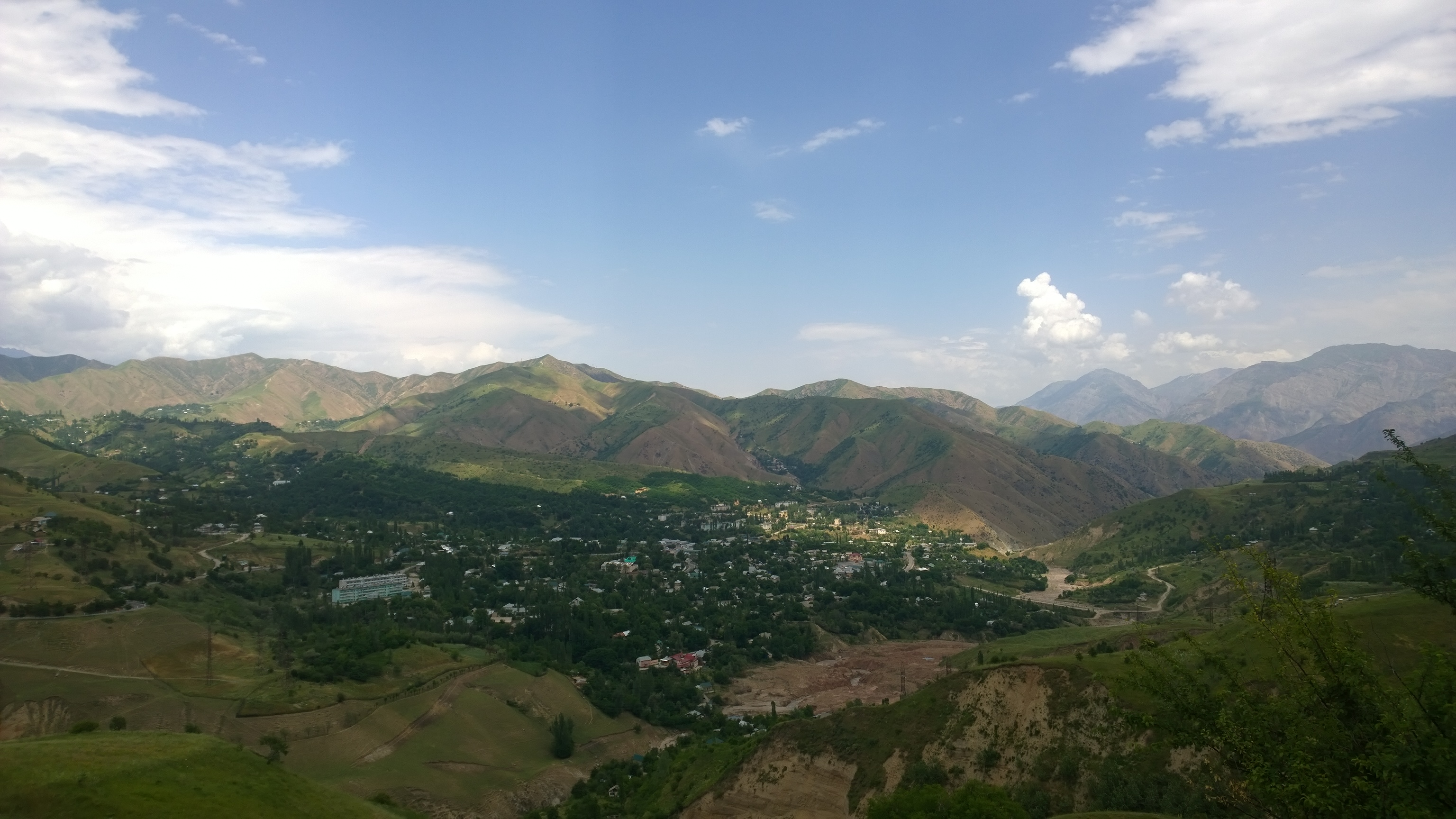

- Location in Tajikistan
- Coordinates: 38°43′N 69°43′E
- Country: Tajikistan
- Region: Districts of Republican Subordination
- City: Roghun
- Elevation: 1,348 m (4,423 ft)

Population (2020)
  - Total: 7,400
- Time zone: UTC+5
- Official languages: Russian (Interethnic); Tajik (State)

Obigarm (Tajik: Обигарм; Russian: Обигарм) is a town in Tajikistan. It is part of the city of Roghun in Districts of Republican Subordination. The population of the town is 7,400 (January 2020 estimate).

== Climate ==
Obigarm has a Warm Summer Continental Climate (Köppen: Dfb) and experiences wet and cold winters with dry cool summers. The average annual temperature is 9.4 °C (48.9 °F). The warmest month is July with an average temperature of 27 °C (80.6 °F) and the coolest month is January with an average temperature of -4.1 °C (24.6 °F). The average annual precipitation is 853.4 mm (33.6") and has an average of 84.7 days with precipitation. The wettest month is March with an average of 147.9 mm (5.8") of precipitation and the driest month is August with an average of 3.3 mm (0.1") of precipitation.

Climate data for Obigarm
Month	Jan	Feb	Mar	Apr	May	Jun	Jul	Aug	Sep	Oct	Nov	Dec	Year
Mean daily maximum °C (°F)	−1.8 (28.8)	−0.5 (31.1)	5.3 (41.5)	12.6 (54.7)	17.5 (63.5)	23.6 (74.5)	27.0 (80.6)	26.3 (79.3)	22.0 (71.6)	14.4 (57.9)	7.2 (45.0)	1.1 (34.0)	12.9 (55.2)
Daily mean °C (°F)	−4.1 (24.6)	−2.2 (28.0)	3.5 (38.3)	10.2 (50.4)	14.2 (57.6)	19.0 (66.2)	21.9 (71.4)	20.7 (69.3)	15.9 (60.6)	10.1 (50.2)	4.2 (39.6)	−0.6 (30.9)	9.4 (48.9)
Mean daily minimum °C (°F)	−10.8 (12.6)	−9.6 (14.7)	−3.9 (25.0)	2.1 (35.8)	5.5 (41.9)	9.3 (48.7)	11.8 (53.2)	10.5 (50.9)	5.9 (42.6)	1.0 (33.8)	−3.6 (25.5)	−7.3 (18.9)	0.9 (33.6)
Average precipitation mm (inches)	87.8 (3.46)	104.6 (4.12)	147.9 (5.82)	144.0 (5.67)	121.9 (4.80)	27.6 (1.09)	12.3 (0.48)	3.3 (0.13)	4.5 (0.18)	52.8 (2.08)	65.4 (2.57)	81.3 (3.20)	853.4 (33.6)
Average precipitation days	8.6	10.1	12.6	12.3	11.0	4.4	2.6	1.2	1.6	5.4	6.5	8.4	84.7
Average relative humidity (%)	69.2	68.8	64.8	61.7	56.3	42.7	37.9	38.8	41.7	51.2	58.8	66.1	54.8
Source: Weatherbase.com

== See also ==
- List of cities in Tajikistan
- List of towns and villages in Tajikistan
