= Roghun =

Roghun Роғун
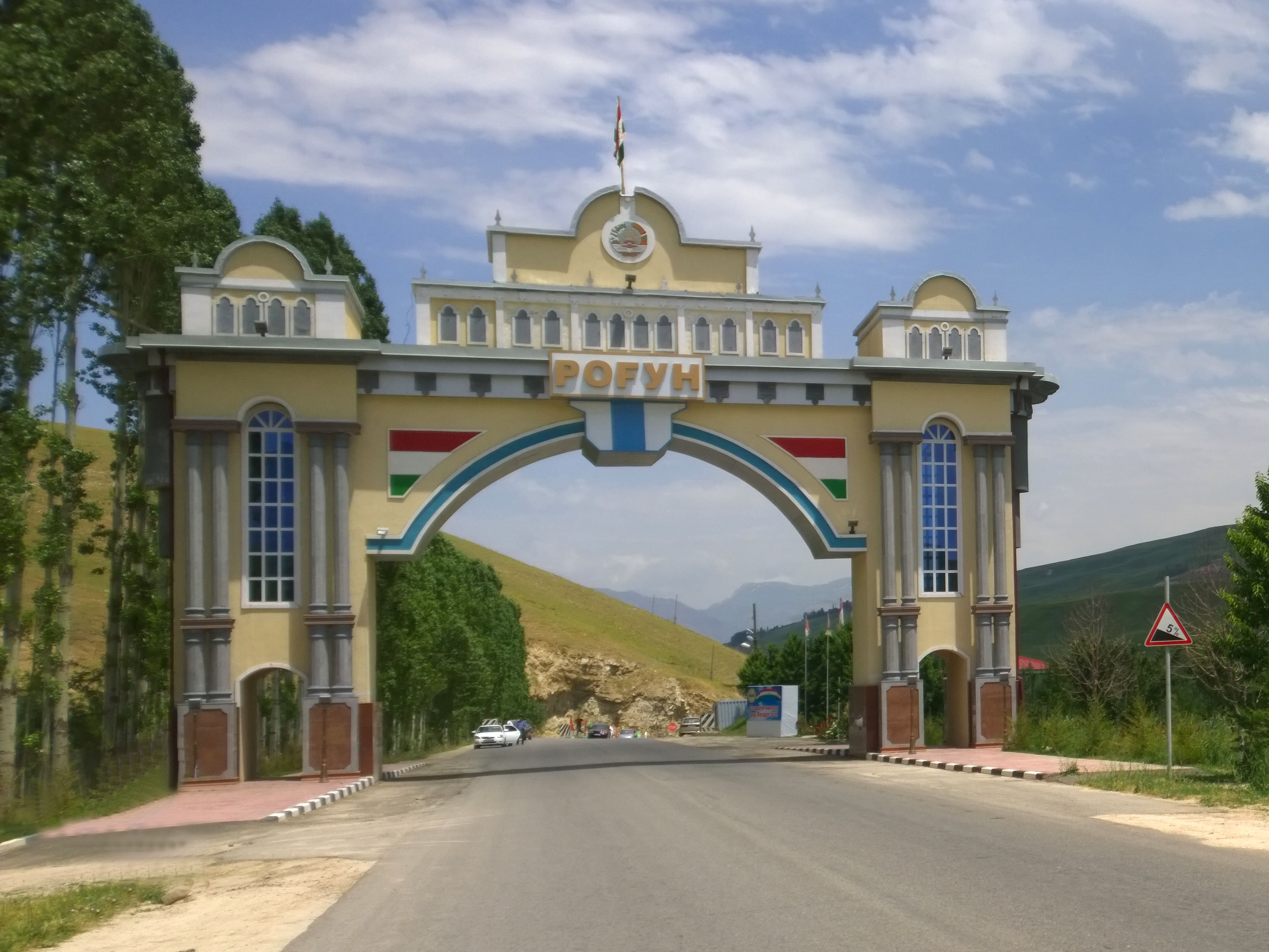

- Location in Tajikistan
- Coordinates: 38°41′52″N 69°45′8″E
- Country: Tajikistan
- Region: Districts of Republican Subordination
- Elevation: 1,230 m (4,035 ft)

Population (2020)
  - City: 44,100
  - Urban: 14,900
- Time zone: UTC+5
- Official languages: Russian (Interethnic); Tajik (State) (Note: Constitution of Tajikistan)

Roghun (Tajik: Роғун; Russian: Рогун) is a city in Tajikistan. The city was the seat of the former Roghun District, and is part of the Districts of Republican Subordination. Its population is estimated at 14,900 for the city proper and 44,100 for the city with the outlying communities (2020).

== Subdivisions ==
Before ca. 2018, Roghun was the seat of Roghun District, which covered the rural part of the present city of Roghun. The city of Roghun covers Roghun proper, the town Obigarm and two jamoats. These are as follows:

Jamoat	Population (Jan. 2015)
Obigarm (town)	6,500
Qadiob	13,000
Sicharog	3,692

== Climate ==
Roghun has a continental Mediterranean climate (Köppen: Dsb) and experiences wet and cold winters with dry warm (although rather cool by subtropical standards) summers. The average annual temperature is 9 °C or 48.2 °F. The hottest month is July with an average temperature of 20.7 °C or 69.3 °F and the coldest month is January with an average temperature of −5.5 °C or 22.1 °F. The average annual precipitation is 877.6 millimetres or 34.55 inches and there is an average of 84.5 days with precipitation. The wettest month is March with an average of 152.1 millimetres or 5.99 inches of precipitation and the driest month is August with an average of 3.9 millimetres or 0.15 inches of precipitation.

Climate data for Roghun
Month	Jan	Feb	Mar	Apr	May	Jun	Jul	Aug	Sep	Oct	Nov	Dec	Year
Mean daily maximum °C (°F)	−1.8 (28.8)	−0.5 (31.1)	5.3 (41.5)	12.6 (54.7)	17.5 (63.5)	23.6 (74.5)	27.0 (80.6)	26.3 (79.3)	22.0 (71.6)	14.4 (57.9)	7.2 (45.0)	1.1 (34.0)	12.9 (55.2)
Daily mean °C (°F)	−5.5 (22.1)	−3.6 (25.5)	2.2 (36.0)	9.0 (48.2)	13.0 (55.4)	17.7 (63.9)	20.7 (69.3)	19.7 (67.5)	14.9 (58.8)	9.0 (48.2)	3.0 (37.4)	−1.9 (28.6)	8.2 (46.7)
Mean daily minimum °C (°F)	−10.8 (12.6)	−9.6 (14.7)	−3.9 (25.0)	2.1 (35.8)	5.5 (41.9)	9.3 (48.7)	11.8 (53.2)	10.5 (50.9)	5.9 (42.6)	1.0 (33.8)	−3.6 (25.5)	−7.3 (18.9)	0.9 (33.6)
Average precipitation mm (inches)	90.1 (3.55)	107.8 (4.24)	152.1 (5.99)	147.8 (5.82)	128.3 (5.05)	20.7 (0.81)	13.9 (0.55)	3.9 (0.15)	4.8 (0.19)	55.5 (2.19)	68.3 (2.69)	84.4 (3.32)	877.6 (34.55)
Average precipitation days	8.4	9.8	12.3	12.2	11.2	4.7	2.9	1.4	1.7	5.4	6.3	8.2	84.5
Average relative humidity (%)	68.8	68.8	64.7	61.7	56.8	43.7	38.1	38.8	41.8	51.2	58.4	65.5	54.9
Source: Weatherbase.com

== See also ==
- Roghun Dam
