= Dehmalik =

Dehmalik Деҳмалик
- Village and Jamoat
- Location within Tajikistan
- Coordinates: 38°51′N 68°55′E
- Country: Tajikistan
- Region: Districts of Republican Subordination
- District: Varzob District

Population (2015)
  - Total: 8,034
- Time zone: UTC+5 (TJT)

Dehmalik (Tajik: Деҳмалик, Persian: ده‌ملِک) is a village and jamoat in Tajikistan. It is located in Varzob District, one of the Districts of Republican Subordination. The jamoat has a total population of 8,034 (2015). Villages: Warmonik, Garob, Dehmalik, Zumand, Pichandar, Pishanbe, Porut, Poshum, Rogh, Safeddorak, Tagob.
