= Varzobqala =

- Village and Jamoat
- Location within Tajikistan
- Coordinates: 38°46′N 68°49′E
- Country: Tajikistan
- Region: Districts of Republican Subordination
- District: Varzob District

Population (2015)
  - Total: 11,438
- Time zone: UTC+5 (TJT)
- Official languages: Russian (Interethnic); Tajik (State)

Varzobqala (Russian: Варзобкала; Tajik: Варзобқалъа, Persian: ورزاب‌قلعه) is a village and jamoat in Tajikistan. It is located in Varzob District, one of the Districts of Republican Subordination. The jamoat has a total population of 11,438 (2015). Villages: Beghar, Varzob, Varzobqal'a, Dashti Rinjon, Zimchurud, Kondara, Pughuze, Rabot, Fanfaroq, Khoja Obi Garm, Shafti Mijgon, Ghazhne, Ghusgharf, Hushyori, Jirino.
