= Kofarnihon =

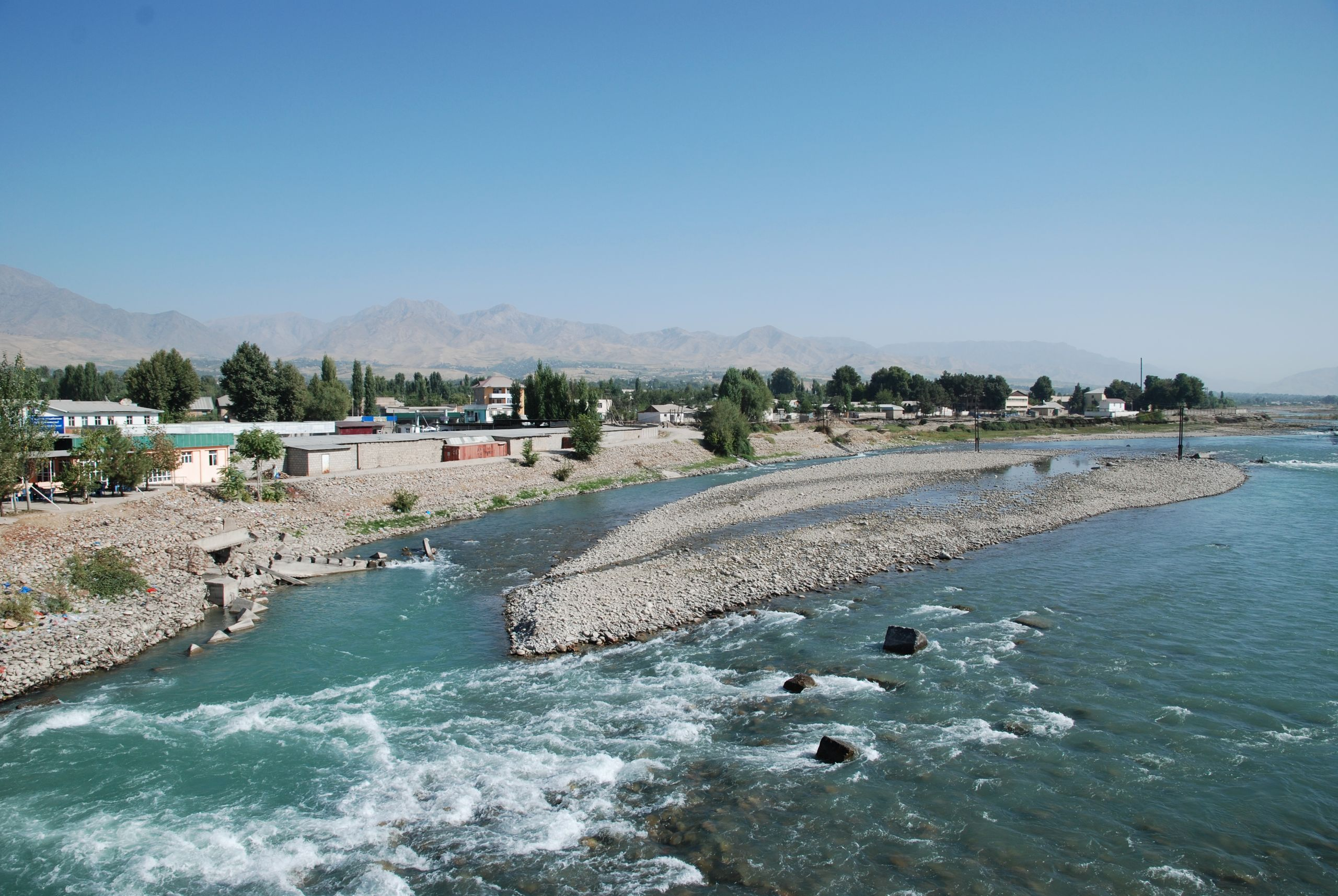
- The Kofarnihon in Vahdat

Location
- Country: Tajikistan, Uzbekistan

Physical characteristics
- Mouth: Amu Darya
  - coordinates: 36°56′13″N 68°00′53″E
- Length: 387 km (240 mi)
- Basin size: 11,600 km^{2} (4,500 sq mi)

Basin features
- Progression: Amu Darya→ Aral Sea

The Kofarnihon (Tajik: Кофарниҳон, Uzbek: Kofarnihon) is one of the major tributaries of the Amu Darya (together with Vakhsh and Panj) in Tajikistan. The river is 387 kilometres (240 mi) long and has a basin area of 11,600 square kilometres (4,500 mi^{2}). It rises on the southern slopes of Gissar Range in Vahdat district, formerly Kofarnihon district, and flows in the general south-western direction past the cities of Vahdat and Dushanbe, where it turns south and runs through Khatlon Province toward the border with Afghanistan. It falls into Amudarya some 40 km (25 mi) west of the confluence point of Vakhsh and Panj rivers. The Kofarnihon is an important source of drinking water, and yet it is highly polluted by irrigation runoff and inadequately cleaned recycled water around the cities of Dushanbe and Vahdat.

For part of its course, it forms the border between Tajikistan and Uzbekistan. Its main tributaries are the Varzob and Khanaka from the right, and the Elok from the right.
