= Safed Dara =

Ski resort in Tajikistan

Takob
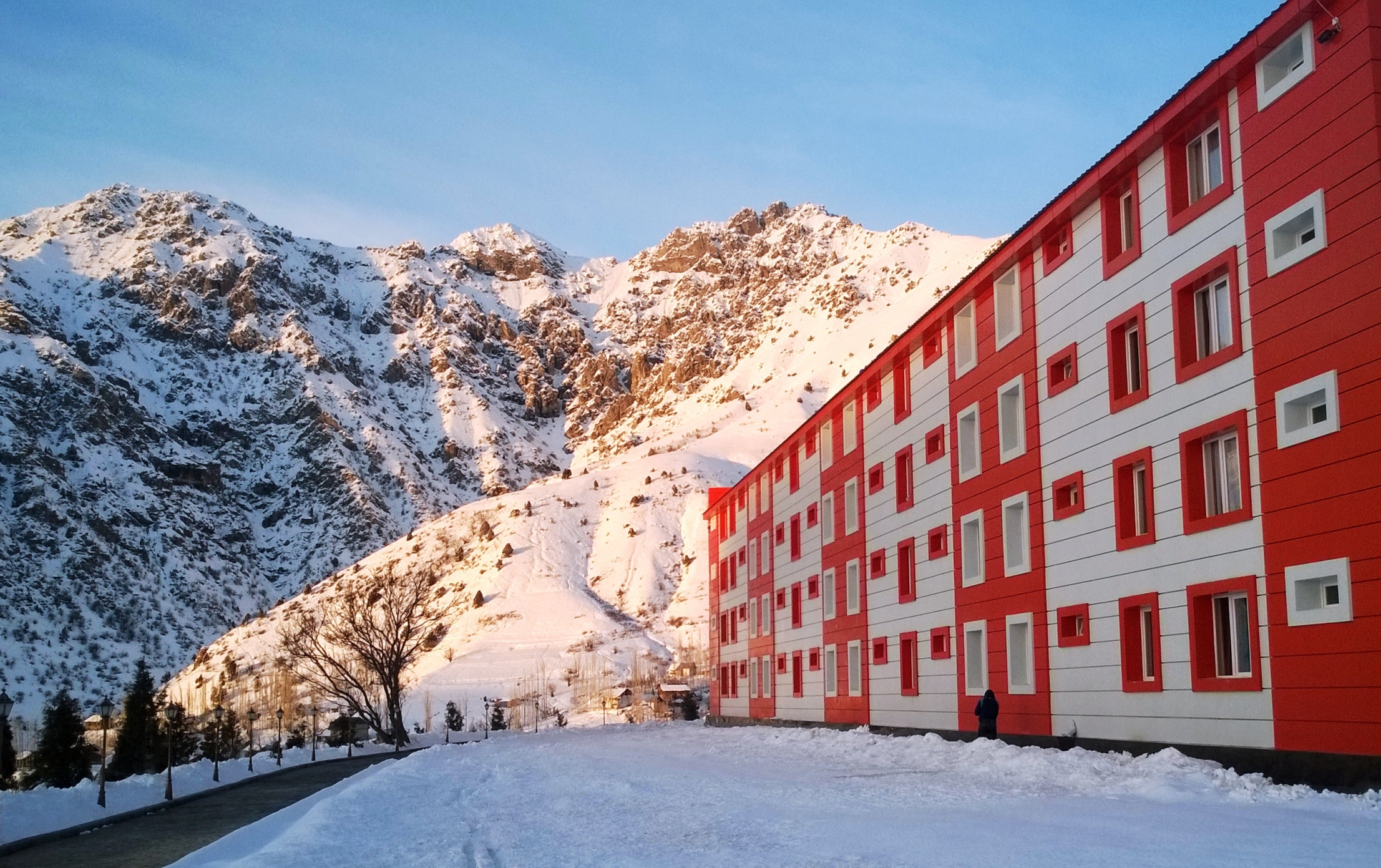
- Safed Dara Hotel

- Location within Tajikistan
- Location: Safedorak Plateau, Tajikistan
- Nearest city: Varzob
- Coordinates: 38.86°N 68.99°E
- Top elevation: 3,000 m (9,800 ft)
- Base elevation: 2,100 m (6,900 ft)

Safed Dara (Tajik: Caфeд Дapa — formerly Takob (Taкoб)) is a ski resort located in the Region of Republican Subordination (a region in Tajikistan), on the Safedorak Plateau (part of the Pamir Mountains), at heights from 2,100 metres (6,890 feet) up to 3,000 metres (9,842 feet) above sea level, 50 km (31.07 mi) north of Dushanbe. In 2015, the Takob ski resort was renovated and a new name was given: Safed Dara (it means white valley). The old soviet-era hotel has been completely renovated and reopened on 7 January 2016. The two T-bar lifts of 1000 meters each are in working order. A new children's park has also been opened with a new baby-lift.

Ski and snowboard equipment, snow tubes and sledges can be rented directly at the ski resort.

== Gallery ==
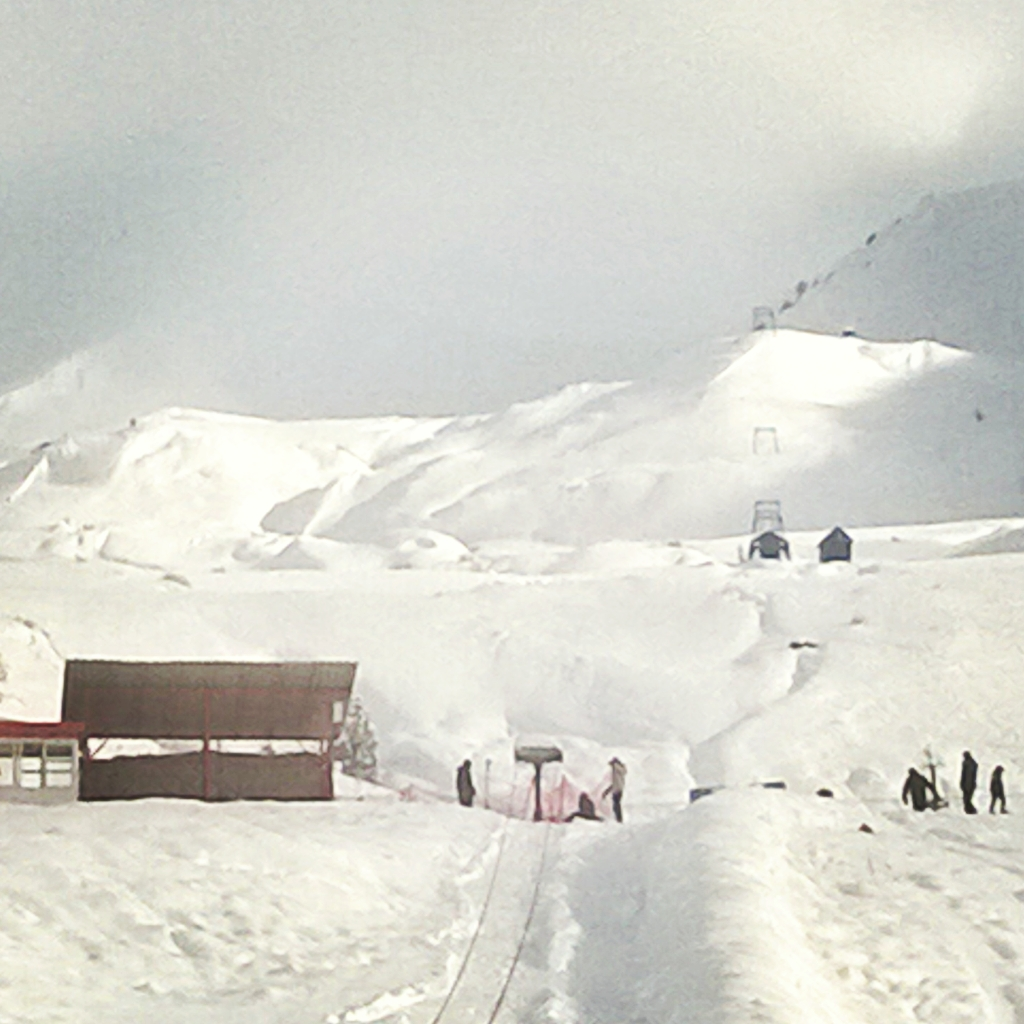
Near the hotel, a children's park was opened in 2016
