= Chorbogh =

Chorbogh Чорбоғ
- Village and Jamoat
- Location within Tajikistan
- Coordinates: 38°40′N 68°46′E
- Country: Tajikistan
- Region: Districts of Republican Subordination
- District: Varzob District

Population (2015)
  - Total: 31,585
- Time zone: UTC+5 (TJT)

Chorbogh (Tajik: Чорбоғ, Persian: چهارباغ) is a village and jamoat in Tajikistan. It is located in Varzob District, one of the Districts of Republican Subordination. The jamoat has a total population of 31,585 (2015). Villages: Araqchin, Gulbogh, Darai Bedho, Darai Foni, Dahana, Duoba, Kulihavoi, Mehrobod, Obizak, Sari Kutal, Chorbogh, Chormaghzakoni Bolo, Chormaghzakoni Poyon, Shodob, Sholiqunghurot, Yakkachughuz, Jangalak.
