= Guliston, Vahdat =

Guliston
- Jamoat
- Location in Tajikistan
- Coordinates: 38°30′25″N 68°56′10″E
- Country: Tajikistan
- Region: Districts of Republican Subordination
- City: Vahdat

Population (2015)
  - Total: 37,452
- Time zone: UTC+5 (TJT)

Guliston (Tajik: Гулистон, formerly Karasu) is a jamoat in Tajikistan. It is part of the city of Vahdat in Districts of Republican Subordination. The jamoat has a total population of 37,452 (2015).
