= Bozorboy Burunov =

- Location in Tajikistan
- Coordinates: 38°31′N 69°01′E
- Country: Tajikistan
- Region: Districts of Republican Subordination
- City: Vahdat

Population (2015)
  - Total: 24,876

Bozorboy Burunov (Russian and Tajik: Бозорбой Бурунов, formerly Yangibozor) is a jamoat in central Tajikistan. It is part of the city of Vahdat in Districts of Republican Subordination. The jamoat has a total population of 24,876 (2015).
