= Rajab Ismoilov =

- Jamoat
- Location within Tajikistan
- Coordinates: 38°31′N 68°58′E
- Country: Tajikistan
- Region: Districts of Republican Subordination
- City: Vahdat

Population (2015)
  - Total: 19,185
- Time zone: UTC+5 (TJT)
- Official languages: Russian (Interethnic); Tajik (State) (Note: Constitution of Tajikistan)

Rajab Ismoilov (Russian: Раджаб Исмоилов; Tajik: Раҷаб Исмоилов, formerly Khojabaykul) is a jamoat in Tajikistan. It is part of the city of Vahdat in Districts of Republican Subordination. The jamoat has a total population of 19,185 (2015).
