= Varzob =

- Location in Tajikistan
- Coordinates: 38°46′25″N 068°49′04″E
- Country: Tajikistan
- Region: Districts of Republican Subordination
- District: Varzob District
- Elevation: 1,108 m (3,635 ft)
- Time zone: GMT/UTC + 05:00 hour

Varzob (Tajik: Варзоб) is a settlement in Varzob District, Districts of Republican Subordination, Tajikistan, in central Asia. It is the administrative center for the Varzob District.

== Geography ==
Varzob is located on the left (east) bank of the river Varzob, about 25 km north of Dushanbe. The village of Begar lies about 2.5 km north of Varzob on the right bank of the river, and the village of Varzobkala lies just 0.75 km south of Varzob on the right bank of the river.

There are seven rivers in the area: the Varzob, the Simiganj, the Sioma, the Seer, the Vakhsh, the Amoo, and the Sorhob.

View from Bigar table. 4 km north from the Varzob centre. Elevation: 1530m. 38.799316°N 68.838658°E

== Notes ==
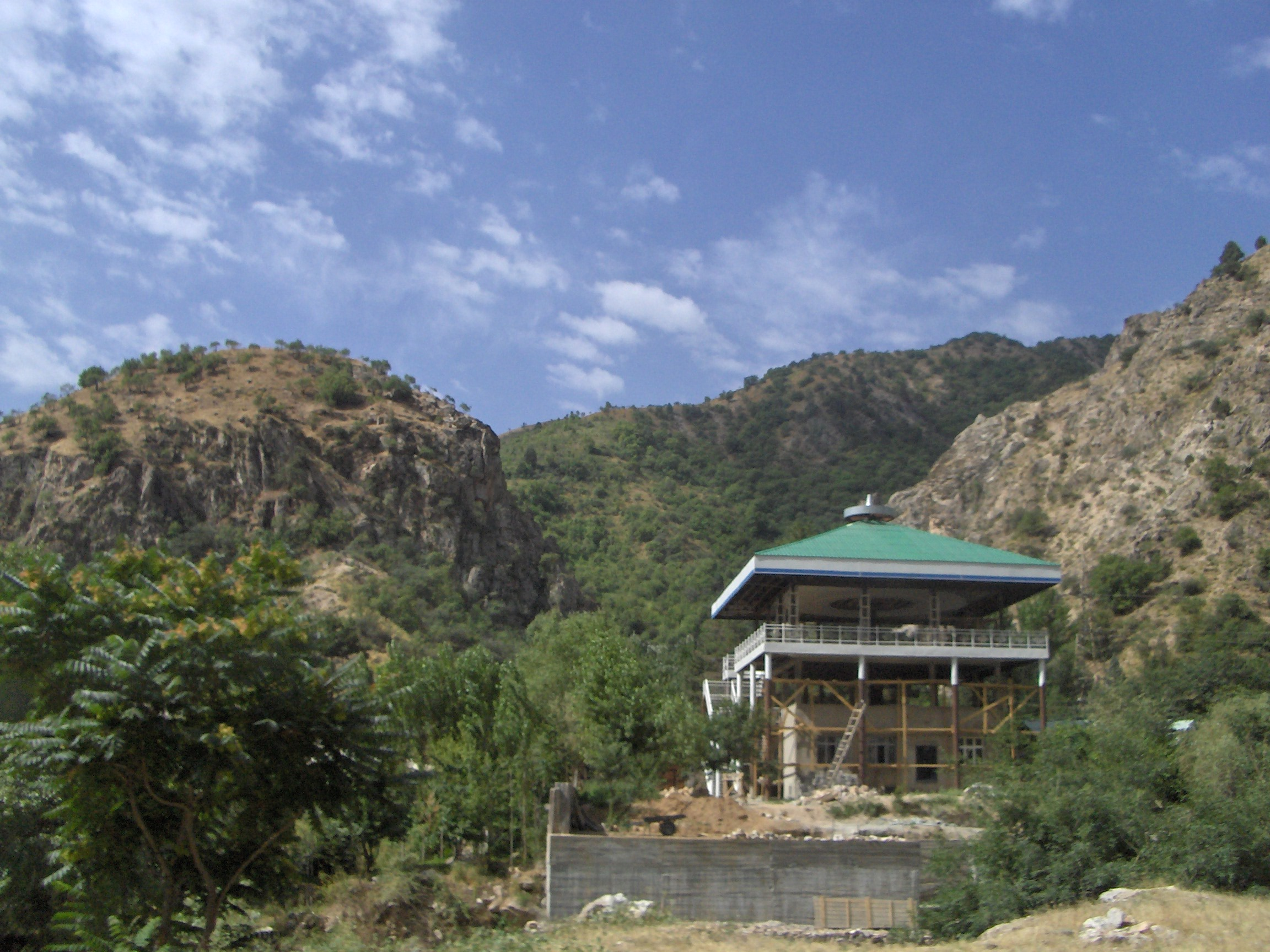
Varzob
