= Qadiob =

- Village and Jamoat
- Location within Tajikistan
- Coordinates: 38°43′N 69°41′E
- Country: Tajikistan
- Region: Districts of Republican Subordination
- City: Roghun

Population (2015)
  - Total: 13,000
- Time zone: UTC+5 (TJT)
- Official languages: Russian (Interethnic); Tajik (State) (Note: Constitution of Tajikistan)

Qadiob (Russian: Кадиоб; Tajik: Қадиоб, Persian: قد آب) is a village and jamoat in Tajikistan. It is part of the city of Roghun in Districts of Republican Subordination. The jamoat has a total population of 13,000 (2015).
