= Karim Ismoilov =

- Jamoat
- Location within Tajikistan
- Coordinates: 38°31′N 69°03′E
- Country: Tajikistan
- Region: Districts of Republican Subordination
- City: Vahdat

Population (2015)
  - Total: 34,544
- Time zone: UTC+5 (TJT)

Karim Ismoilov (Tajik: Карим Исмоилов, formerly Eskiguzar) is a jamoat in Tajikistan. It is part of the city of Vahdat in Districts of Republican Subordination. The jamoat has a total population of 34,544 (2015).
