= Ayni, Varzob District =

Ayni Tajik: Айнӣ
- Jamoat
- Location within Tajikistan
- Coordinates: 38°40′N 68°49′E
- Country: Tajikistan
- Region: Districts of Republican Subordination
- District: Varzob District

Population (2015)
  - Total: 14,052
- Time zone: UTC+5 (TJT)
- Official languages: Russian (Interethnic); Tajik (State)

Ayni (Russian: Айни; Tajik: Айнӣ, Persian: عینی) is a jamoat in Tajikistan. It is located in Varzob District, one of the Districts of Republican Subordination. The jamoat has a total population of 14,052 (2015). Villages: Bakavul, Bakavuli Nav, Buvak, Guliston, Dara, Dashti Miron, Oriyono, Oghurti, Purzobod, Toshbuloq, Kharangoni Bolo, Kharangoni Miyona, Chinor, Sharshara, Sheykhak, Yakkachashma.
