= Simiganj =

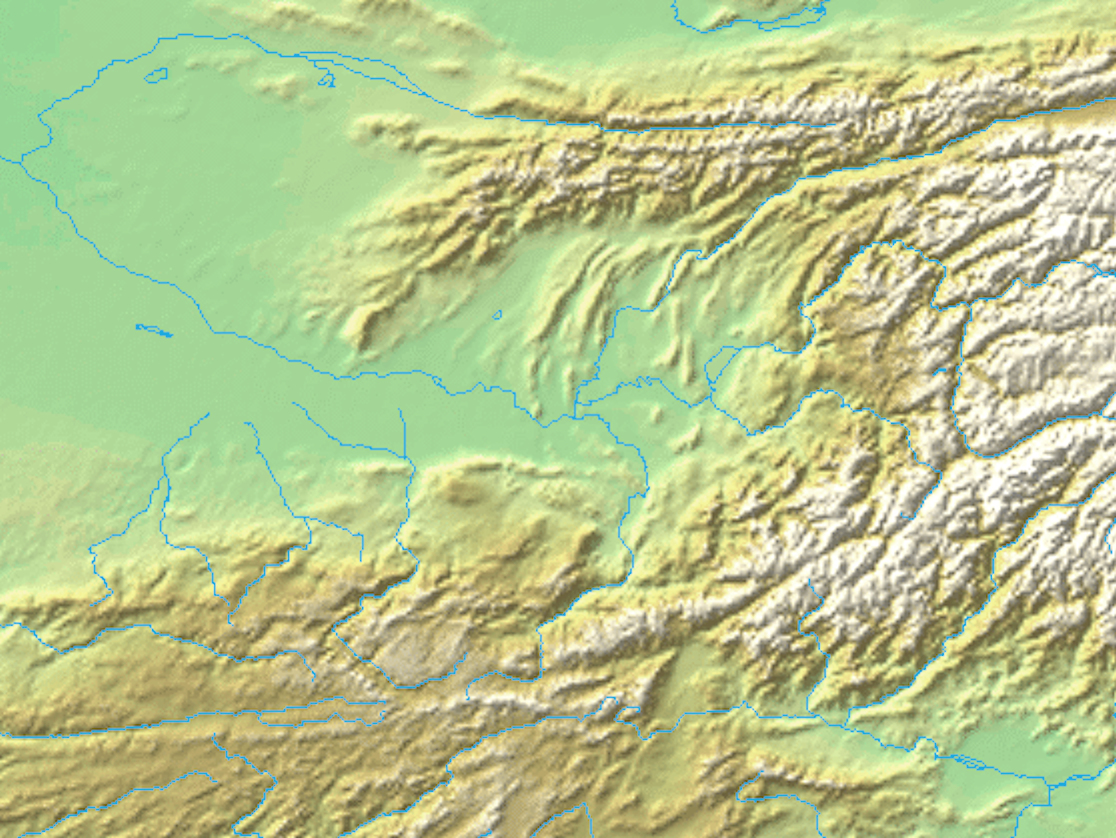
- Location within West and Central Asia Location within Bactria Location within Tajikistan
- Coordinates: 38°39′09″N 069°00′23″E
- Country: Tajikistan
- Region: Districts of Republican Subordination
- City: Vahdat

Population (2015)
  - Total: 35,473
- Time zone: GMT/UTC + 05:00 hour
- Official languages: Russian (Interethnic); Tajik (State)

Simiganj (Russian: Симигандж; Tajik: Симиганҷ) is a village and jamoat in Tajikistan. It is part of the city of Vahdat in Districts of Republican Subordination. The jamoat has a total population of 35,473 (2015). The river Simiganj flows through the town.

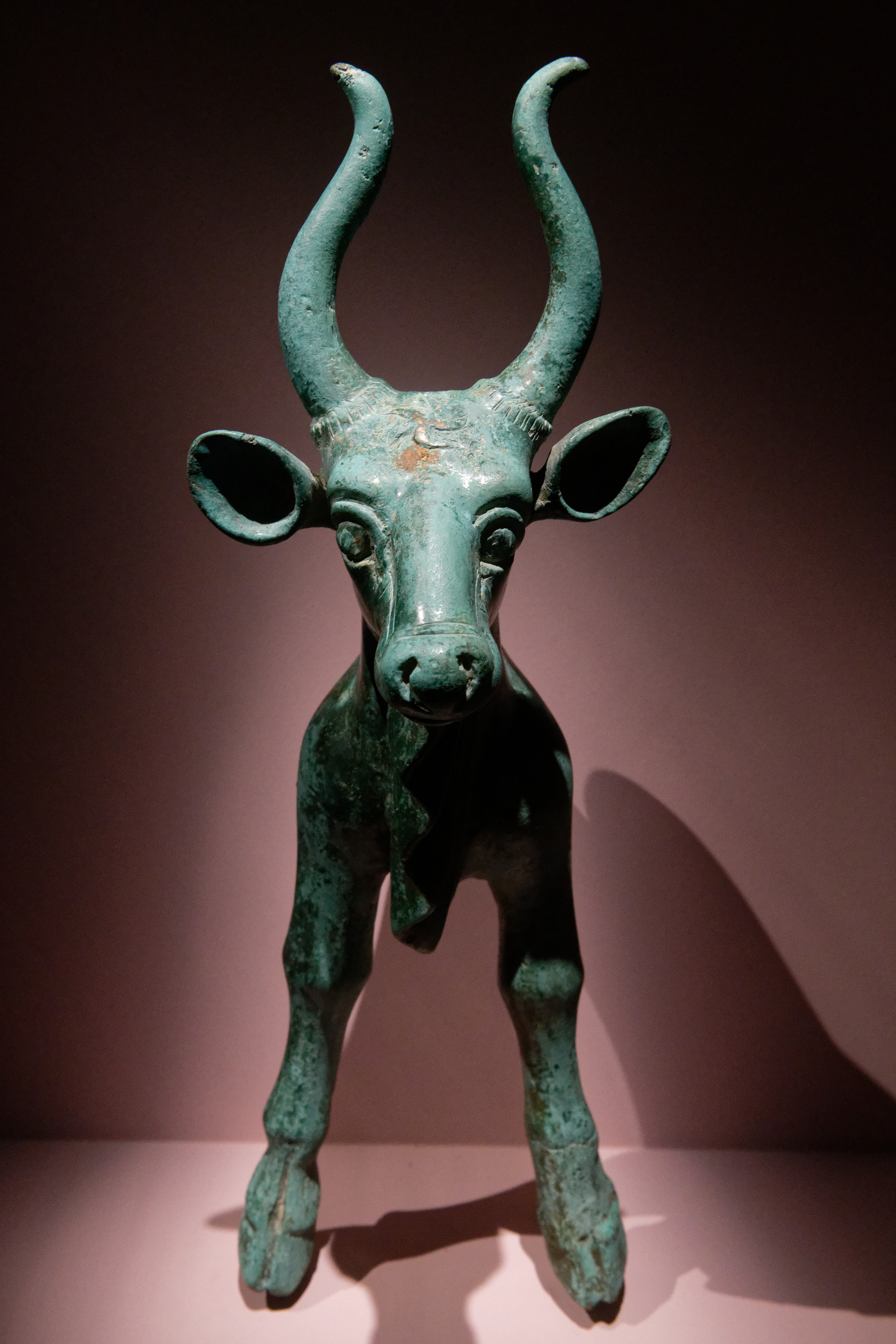
Element from a throne in the shape of a zebu. From Simiganj, Tajikistan, Ve-IIIe siècles BC.
