= Sicharogh =

- Village and Jamoat
- Location within Tajikistan
- Coordinates: 38°44′N 69°48′E
- Country: Tajikistan
- Region: Districts of Republican Subordination
- City: Roghun

Population (2015)
  - Total: 3,692
- Time zone: UTC+5 (TJT)
- Official languages: Russian (Interethnic); Tajik (State)

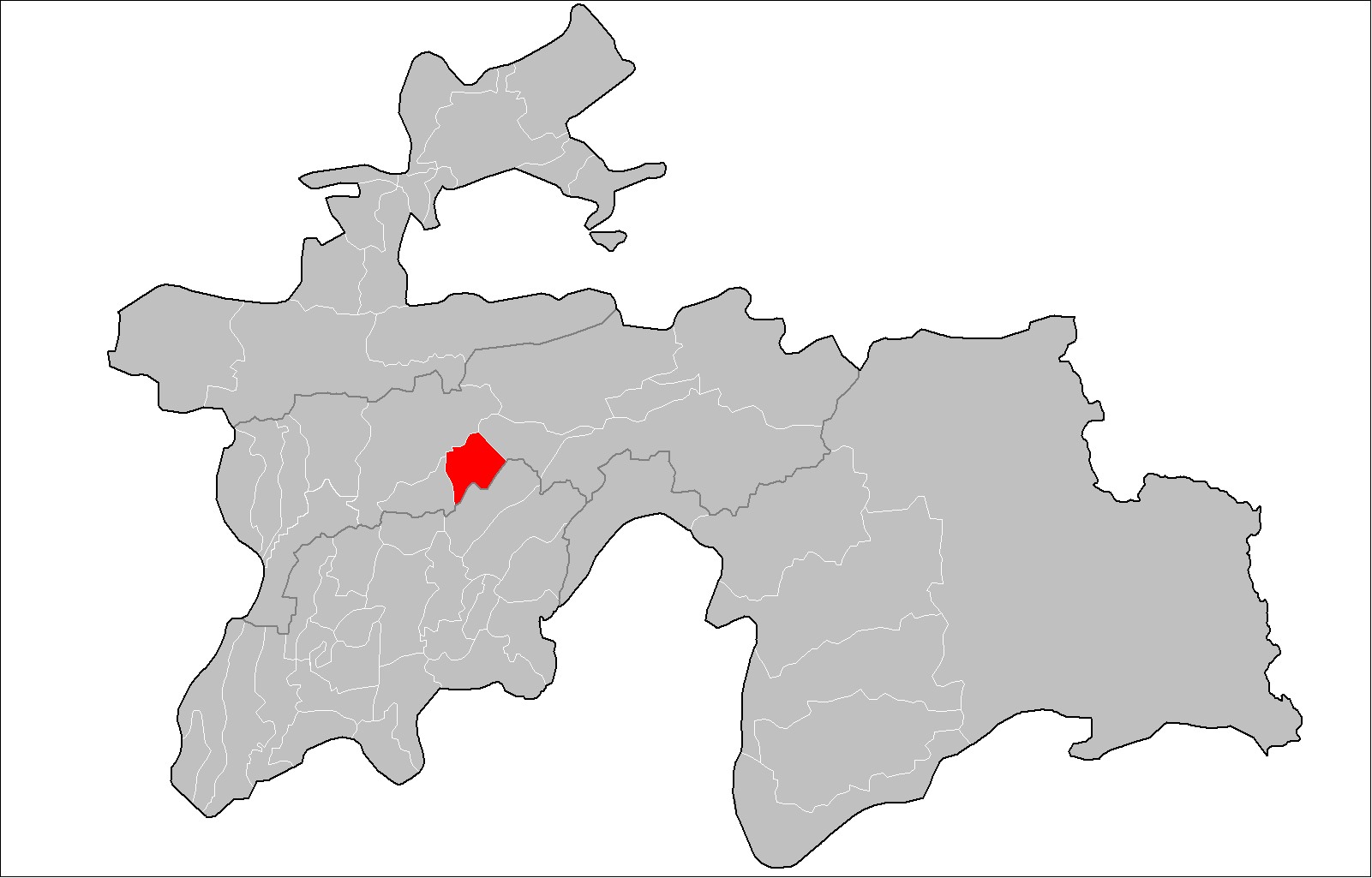
Roghun District in Tajikistan

Sicharogh (Russian: Синчарог; Tajik: Сичароғ/سی‌چراغ) is a village and jamoat in Tajikistan. It is part of the city of Roghun in Districts of Republican Subordination. The jamoat has a total population of 3,692 (2015).
