= Chuyangaron =

Village and jamoat in Tajikistan

- Village and Jamoat
- Location within Tajikistan
- Coordinates: 38°39′N 69°09′E
- Country: Tajikistan
- Region: Districts of Republican Subordination
- City: Vahdat

Population (2015)
  - Total: 21,076
- Time zone: UTC+5 (TJT)

Chuyangaron (Tajik: Чӯянгарон, Persian: جویانگران) is a village and jamoat in Tajikistan. It is part of the city of Vahdat in Districts of Republican Subordination. The jamoat has a total population of 21,076 (2015).
