= Eduardas Mieželaitis =

Lithuanian and Soviet poet (1919–1997)

Eduardas Mieželaitis (3 October 1919 – 6 June 1997) was a Lithuanian Soviet poet, translator, essayist and public figure. In 1974 he was awarded the title Hero of Socialist Labour.

== Biography ==
He was born to the family of a village teacher. In 1923, he moved with his family to Kaunas and studied at the Faculty of Law of the Vytautas Magnus University from 1939. Mieželaitis was a member of the underground Komsomol of the Communist Party of Lithuania from 1935 and published his first poems in the same year.

In 1940, Mieželaitis enthusiastically supported the annexation of Lithuania by the Soviet Union. He was appointed chief editor of the Komjaunimo tiesa (the Lithuanian language edition of Komsomolskaya Pravda). After the German invasion of the Soviet Union, he was evacuated to Nikolsk in the Penza Oblast where he worked at the Krasnyj Gigant factory. In 1942, he was mobilized to the Red Army, and in 1943, he was sent to the front as a war correspondent for the division newspaper of the 16th Rifle Division on the Bryansk, Central and 1st Baltic Front. In 1944 he was dismissed from the army and sent to work in the Komsomol organs. From 1944 to 1946, he was the secretary of the Lithuanian Komsomol Central Committee, and he wrote poetry simultaneously with his work in the Komsomol.

Later, he became the editor of the communist periodical Jaunimo gretos, then of the Žvaigždutė (until 1951). From 1951 he was engaged in literary activity. From 1954, he was secretary and from 1959 to 1970, Mieželaitis was president of the Writers' Union of the Lithuanian SSR. In the 1960s, he published many volumes of poetry.

From 1960 to 1989, he was a member of the Central Committee of the Communist Party of Lithuania, from 1962 to 1970 deputy to the Supreme Soviet of the Soviet Union, and 1975 from 1989, deputy chairman of the Presidium of the Supreme Soviet of the Lithuanian SSR.

Unlike most Lithuanian artists, Mieželaitis did not abandon his communist beliefs and distanced himself from the Lithuanian nationalist movement which led to Lithuania's independence.

== Works ==
- Dainų išausiu margą raštą. 1952.
- Mano lakstingala. 1956.
- Žvaigždžių papėdė. 1959.
- Broliska poema. Wilnius, 1960
- Lineliai. Wilnius, 1960
- Saulė gintare: eilėraščiai, apmąstymai. Wilnius, 1961
- Zmogus. Wilnius, 1962.
- auto portraits. Aviaeskizai, 1962.
- Atogrąžos panorama. 1963.
- Lyriniai etiudai. 1964.
- Naktiniai drugiai: monologas. Vilnius, 1966.
- Antakalnio barokas. 1971.
- Žibuoklių žvaigždynai. 1977.
- Kardiograma. 1978.
- Postskriptumai. 1986.
- Gnomos. 1987.
- Laida. 1992.
- Saulės vėjas. 1995.
- Mitai. 1996.
- Mažoji lyra. 1999.
