= Varzob (river) =

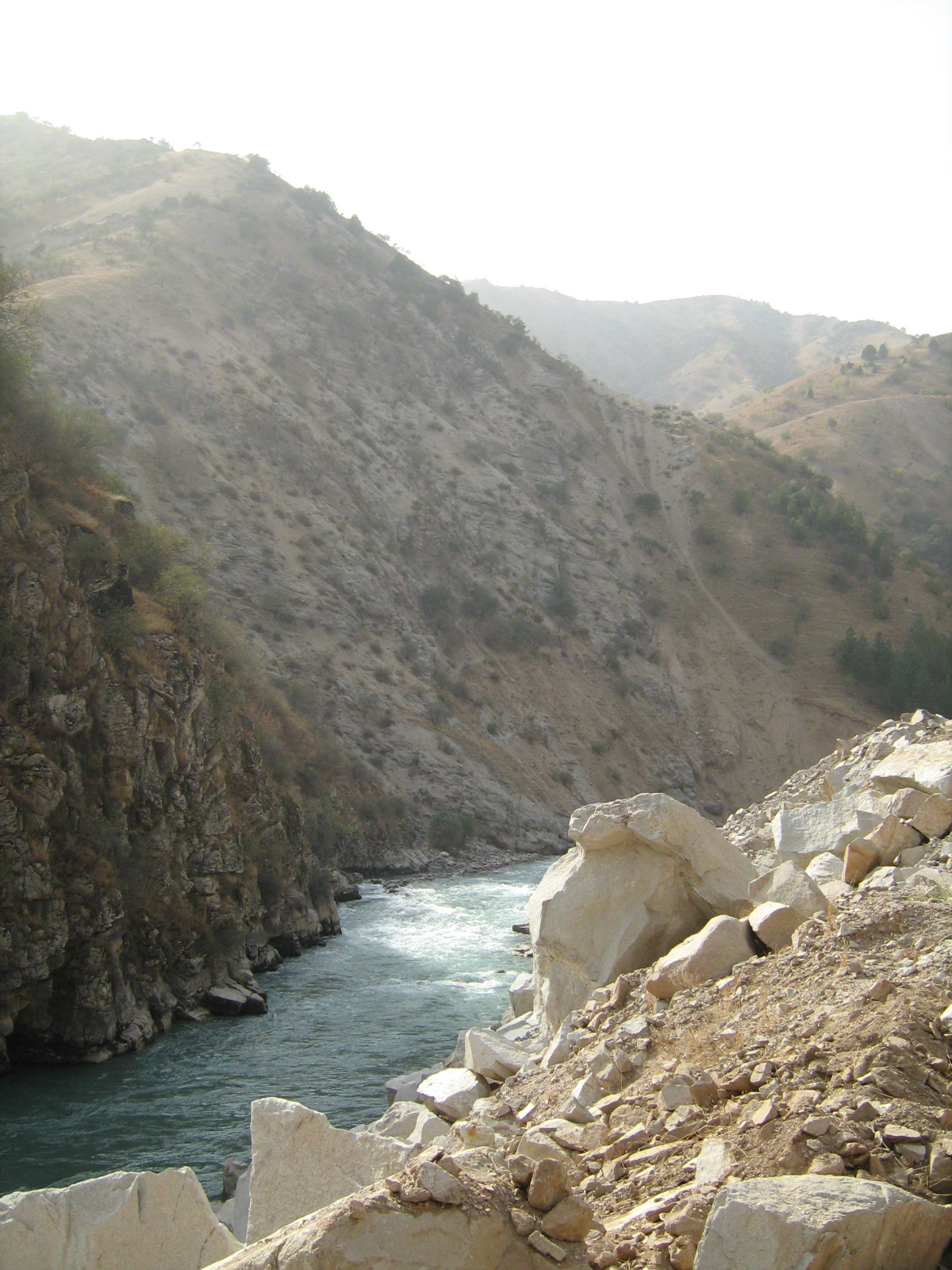

Location
- Country: Tajikistan

Physical characteristics
- Mouth: Kofarnihon
  - coordinates: 38.4818°N 68.7751°E
- Length: 71 km (44 mi)
- Basin size: 1,740 km^{2} (670 sq mi)

Basin features
- Progression: Kofarnihon→ Amu Darya→ Aral Sea

The Varzob (Tajik: Варзоб, in the lower reaches also Dushanbinka) is a right tributary of the river Kofarnihon in Tajikistan. It is 71 kilometres (44 mi) long and has a basin area of 1,740 square kilometres (670 mi^{2}).

The Varzob rises on the southern flank of the Gissar Mountains, and flows south. It passes through the Varzob District, the town Varzob and through the Tajik capital Dushanbe.
