= Chorsu, Vahdat =

Chorsu
- Jamoat
- Location in Tajikistan
- Coordinates: 38°27′N 69°10′E
- Country: Tajikistan
- Region: Districts of Republican Subordination
- City: Vahdat

Population (2015)
  - Total: 3,913
- Time zone: UTC+5 (TJT)

Chorsu (Tajik: Чорсӯ, Persian: چهارسو) is a jamoat in Tajikistan. It is part of the city of Vahdat in Districts of Republican Subordination. The jamoat has a total population of 3,913 (2015).
