= Star of President Order =

Turkmenistani award

Star of President Order Prezidentiň ýyldyzy
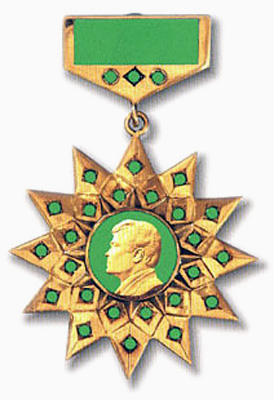

Awarded by Turkmenistan
- Type: Order
- Eligibility: Turkmenian and foreigners
- Awarded for: Outstanding achievements in the defense of the motherland, the development of friendship and cooperation between peoples, promoting peace, development of national economy and other outstanding service to the state and society
- Sovereign: President Serdar Berdimuhamedow

Precedence
- Next (lower): Galkynysh Order
- Ribbon bar of the order

Star of President Order (Turkmen: Prezidentiň ýyldyzy) – order of Turkmenistan.

== Description ==
Order of the star of the President as the form of a star with 12 rays. In the centre of each beam is stone chrysoprase diameter 2 mm. In the center of the star is the image circle diameter 1,5 mm, covered with green enamel. In the center of the circle is made of gold-domed profile image of the first President of Turkmenistan Saparmurat Niyazov. The width of the image 10 mm, height 15 mm. In the center of the star at a distance 2 mm from the green ring on the coöperation hosts 12 stone chrysoprase, the diameter of each of which is 2 mm. The diameter of the circular part of the order 47 mm.

On the reverse of the order is: «Ýyldyzy» Turkmenistanyň «Prezidentiň ordeni» (Order Of The Star Of The President Of Turkmenistan»). Letter size 4×2 mm. The order is made of gold. Block and connecting ear are made from vermeil.

== Recipients ==
- Gurbanguly Berdimuhamedow – Turkmen president.
- Oleg Kononenko – Russian cosmonaut.
- Abdullah Gül – Turkish president.
