= Romit =

- Village and Jamoat
- Location within Tajikistan
- Coordinates: 38°43′N 69°19′E
- Country: Tajikistan
- Region: Districts of Republican Subordination
- City: Vahdat

Population (2015)
  - Total: 15,440
- Time zone: UTC+5 (TJT)
- Official languages: Russian (Interethnic); Tajik (State) (Note: Constitution of Tajikistan)

Romit (Russian: Ромит; Tajik: Ромит/رامیت) is a village and jamoat in Tajikistan. It is part of the city of Vahdat in Districts of Republican Subordination. The jamoat has a total population of 15,440 (2015).
