= Bahor =

- Village and Jamoat
- Location within Tajikistan
- Coordinates: 38°33′N 68°59′E
- Country: Tajikistan
- Region: Districts of Republican Subordination
- City: Vahdat

Population (2015)
  - Total: 28,276
- Time zone: UTC+5 (TJT)

Bahor (Russian: Бахор; Tajik: Баҳор, Persian: بهار) is a village and jamoat in Tajikistan. It is part of the city of Vahdat in Districts of Republican Subordination. The jamoat has a total population of 28,276 (2015).
