= Luchob =

- Village and Jamoat
- Location within Tajikistan
- Coordinates: 38°42′N 68°41′E
- Country: Tajikistan
- Region: Districts of Republican Subordination
- District: Varzob District

Population (2015)
  - Total: 7,174
- Time zone: UTC+5 (TJT)

Luchob (Tajik: Лучоб, Persian: لوچاب) is a village and jamoat in Tajikistan. It is located in Varzob District, one of the Districts of Republican Subordination. The jamoat has a total population of 7,174 (2015). Villages: Alkhuch, Durmonbuloq, Kosataroshi Bolo, Kosataroshi Poyon, Luchob, Novakandoz, Sayyod, Sarinay, Chorvodor.
