= Vahdat =

Place in Tajikistan

Vahdat Tajik: Ваҳдат
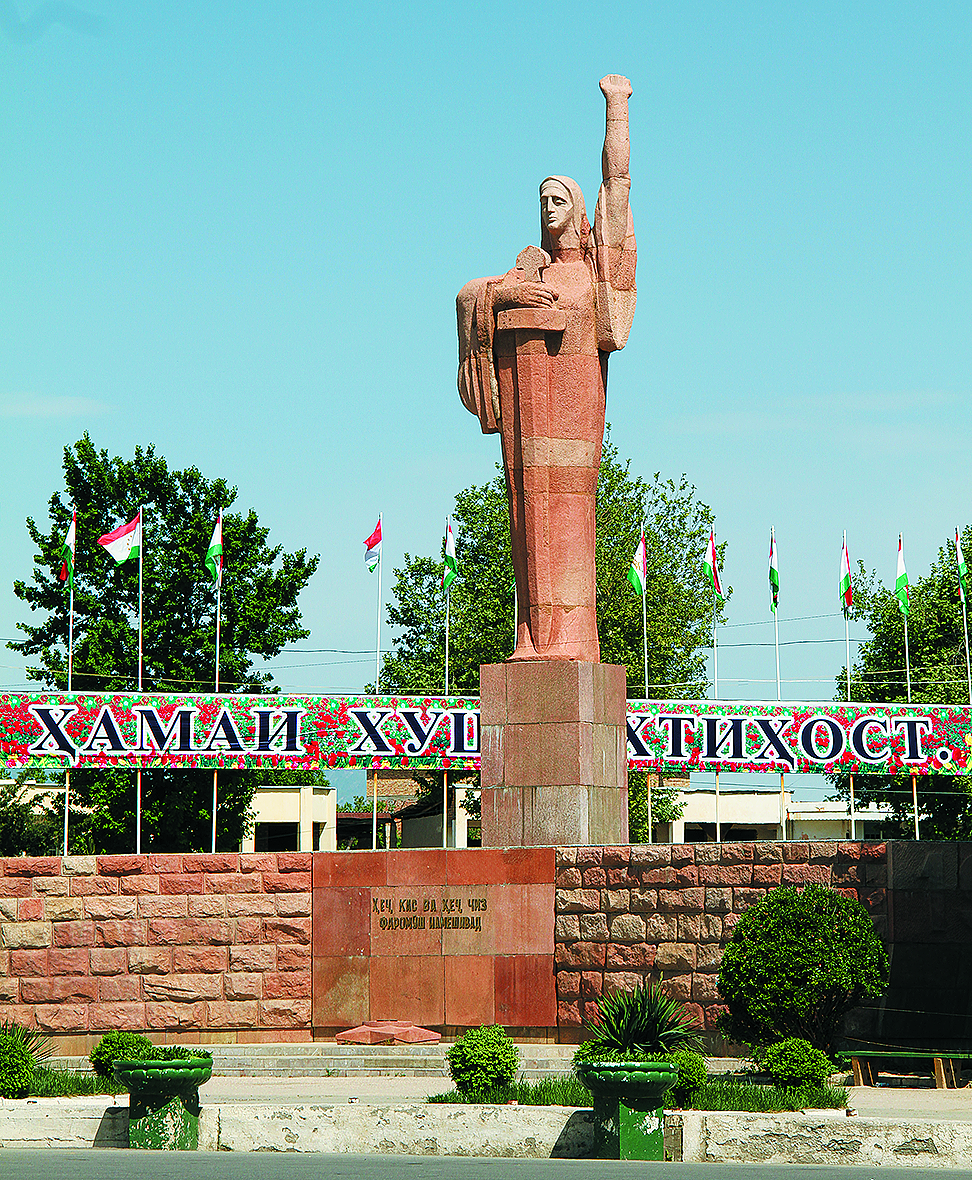

- Location in Tajikistan
- Coordinates: 38°33′11″N 69°01′14″E
- Country: Tajikistan
- Region: Districts of Republican Subordination

Government
  - Chairman: Amirzoda Rahmonali Amir
- Elevation: 870 m (2,850 ft)

Population (2020)
  - City: 342,700
  - Urban: 43,200
- Time zone: +5
- Postal code: 735400
- Official languages: Russian (Interethnic); Tajik (State)
- Website: www.vahdat.tj

Vahdat (Tajik: Ваҳдат) is a city in western Tajikistan, on the bank of the Kofarnihon River, 21 km east of Dushanbe. It was previously called Yangi-Bozor (1927–1936), Orjonikidzeobod (1936–1993, after Grigoriy Ordzhonikidze) and Kofarnihon (1993–2006). The current name of Vahdat is a completely new name that was introduced in the 2000s as part of an official renaming of the settlement. Its population is estimated at 43,200 for the city proper and 342,700 for the city with the outlying communities (2020). Vahdat was the focus of international attention in 2019 when a riot occurred in the city's prison, believed to be instigated by members of Islamic State, which led to the deaths of three guards and 29 inmates.

== Geography ==
The city is located in the upper basin of the river Kofarnihon, and is near the Gissar Range (southern slopes) and the Karategin Range (northern slopes), to the west, the city is on the edge of the Gissar Valley.

== Subdivisions ==
Before ca. 2018, Vahdat was the seat of Vahdat District, which covered the rural part of the present city of Vahdat. The city of Hisor covers Hisor proper, the town Nu'mon Roziq and ten jamoats. These are as follows:

Jamoat	Population (Jan. 2015)
Nu'mon Roziq (town)	11,600
Abdullo Abdulvosiev	43,020
Bahor	28,276
Bozorboy Burunov	24,876
Chorsu	3,913
Chuyangaron	21,076
Guliston	37,452
Karim Ismoilov	34,544
Rajab Ismoilov	19,185
Romit	15,440
Simiganj	35,473

== Demographics ==
The population is composed primarily of Tajiks and Uzbeks, with small numbers of Russians and Tatars. Numbers of Afghan refugees have also made Vahdat home.

== Economy ==
The city's economy is mainly shaped by the surrounding district's agricultural activities: cotton, cattle, grains and vegetable production, and viticulture, with cotton-ginning being the city's dominant industrial activity.

== Transportation ==
There are road and rail connections between Vahdat and Dushanbe. Vahdat's railway station was built in 1930. Highway connections are possible to Jirgatol, Khorog, Kulob, Nurak and Yovon.

== Education ==
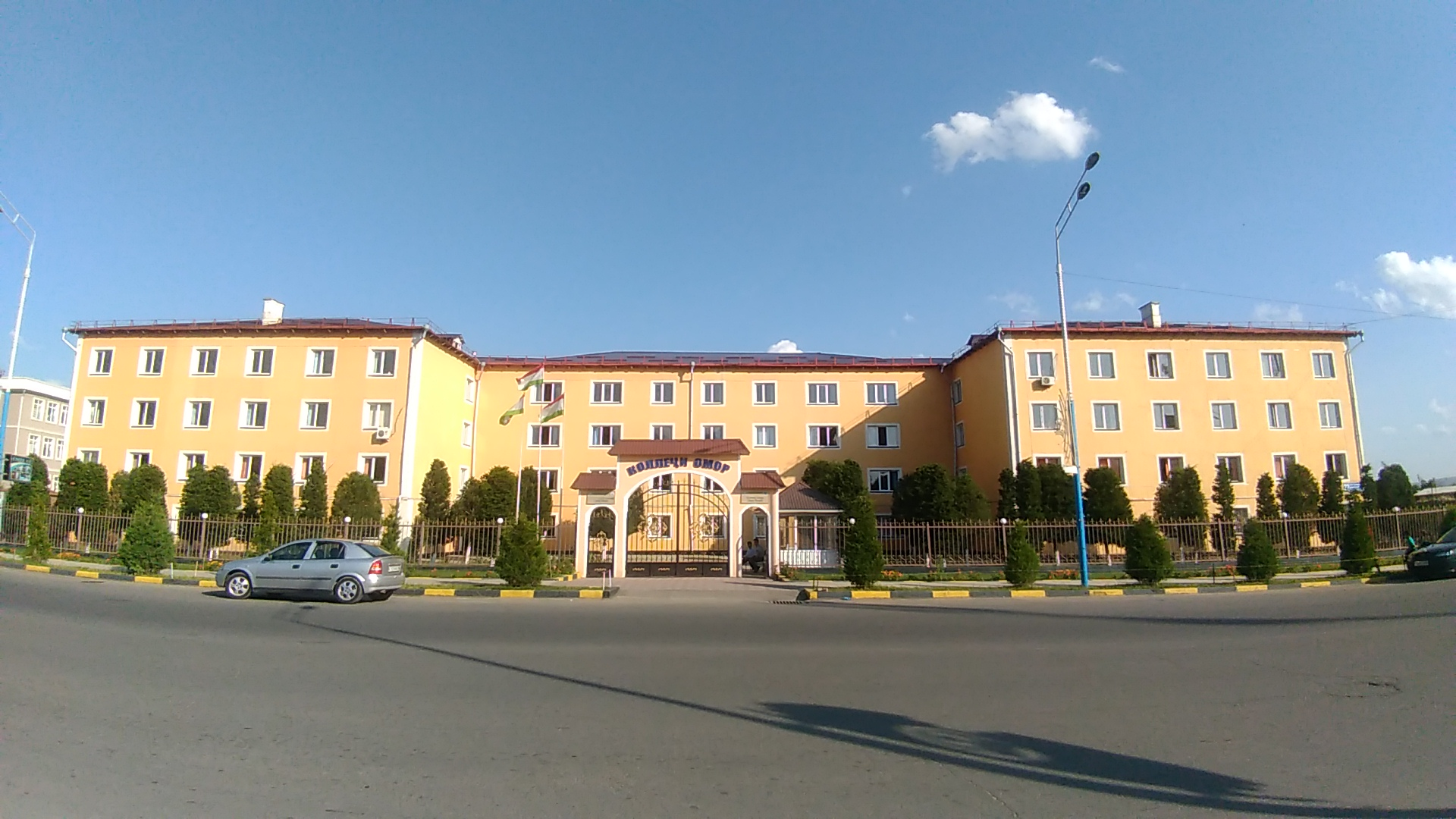
Vahdat Statistical College

The Vahdat Statistical College specializes in courses on finance, accounting and economics.

== Infrastructure ==
Vahdat is the location of a prison which included those convicted of terrorist crimes, mainly associated with membership in Islamic State (ISIS/ISIL) and the Islamic Renaissance Party of Tajikistan (IRPT). In 2019, a prison riot saw three guards and 29 inmates killed, 24 of whom were said to be Islamic militants. One of those killed was Behruz Gulmurod, a son of Gulmurod Halimov, previously a commander of Tajik Interior Ministry special forces who joined ISIS/ISIL in 2015.

== Climate ==
Climate data for Vahdat
Month	Jan	Feb	Mar	Apr	May	Jun	Jul	Aug	Sep	Oct	Nov	Dec	Year
Daily mean °C (°F)	0.9 (33.6)	2.6 (36.7)	8 (46)	14.3 (57.7)	18.5 (65.3)	23.6 (74.5)	26 (79)	24.4 (75.9)	19.7 (67.5)	14 (57)	8.5 (47.3)	3.9 (39.0)	13.7 (56.6)
Average precipitation mm (inches)	71.1 (2.80)	82.3 (3.24)	117.8 (4.64)	114.1 (4.49)	80.9 (3.19)	10.8 (0.43)	5.2 (0.20)	1 (0.0)	3.3 (0.13)	36 (1.4)	49.2 (1.94)	64.4 (2.54)	636.1 (25)
Average precipitation days (≥ 0.1 mm)	10.3	11.6	14.4	12.9	10.6	3.3	1.6	0.6	1.2	5.4	7.1	10	89
Average relative humidity (%)	69.5	68.1	64.5	61	54.5	41.3	38	39.3	41.9	51.5	58.8	67	54.6
Source: weatherbase.com
