= List of mosques in Tajikistan =

This is a list of mosques in Tajikistan.

Images	Name	Location	Year/Century	Remarks
	Central Mosque of Dushanbe	Dushanbe	2009—2019	
	Haji Yaqub Mosque	Dushanbe	1905—1910	
	Sheikh Muslihiddin Mosque and Mausoleum	Khujand	12th century	
	Abdullo Khan Mosque	Isfara	1585—1586	
	Ismaili Mosque	Dushanbe		
	Kulob Central Mosque	Kulob		
	Shohmansur Mosque	Dushanbe	20th century	
	Sariosiyo Mosque	Dushanbe	1800	
	Hisor Muhammad Mosque	Hisor	1991	
	Noji Mosque	Hisor	1925—1926	
	Khonaqokh Mosque	Hisor	1912—1913	
	Sangin Mosque	Hisor	7th century	
	Tukhtaqul Mosque	Isfara	19th century	
	Sarihisor Mosque	Isfara	18th century	
	Navgilem Mosque	Isfara	16th century	
	Mavlono Sayid Mosque	Isfara	12th century	
	Burchak Mosque	Istaravshan	12th century	
	Mavlono Yakub Charkhi Mosque	Guliston	15th century	
	Miyona Mosque	Panjakent	19th century	

== See also ==
- Islam in Tajikistan
- Lists of mosques
