= Hoji Yaqub Mosque =

Congregational mosque in Dushanbe, Tajikistan

- Масҷиди Ҳоҷӣ Яъқуб
- The courtyard of the Haji Yaqub Mosque

Religion
- Affiliation: Sunni Islam
- Dedicated in honour of: Haji Yaqub

Location
- Location: Shodmoni and Habib Ahrori Streets, Ismoili Somoni District, Dushanbe, Tajikistan
- Interactive map of Hoji Yaqub Mosque
- Coordinates: 38.58777°N 68.784041°E

Architecture
- Style: Vernacular Central Asian
- Established: 1890 / 1905–1910
- Capacity: 3,000–12,000

Entrance to the Haji Yaqub Mosque

The Hoji Yaqub Mosque (Tajik: Масҷиди Ҳоҷӣ Яъқуб; Russian: Мечеть Ходжи Якуба), commonly referred to as the Madrasa (Tajik: Мадраса), is a historical congregational mosque and Islamic center in Dushanbe, the capital of Tajikistan. The mosque is named in honor of Hoji Yaqub, a prominent Tajik religious figure who later fled to Afghanistan during the Soviet period.

The complex serves as the national headquarters of the Islamic Center of Tajikistan and the Council of Ulema (Tajik: Шӯрои уламо).

== Location ==
The mosque is situated within the historic core of the city (on the site of the former village of Dushanbe) in the Ismoili Somoni District, at the intersection of Shodmoni and Habib Ahrori Streets, just off central Rudaki Avenue. It is located adjacent to the Avesto Hotel, Istiqlol Park, and the Imam Azam Tajik Islamic Institute.

== History ==
While popular accounts trace the origins of a Muslim house of worship on the site back roughly two centuries, academic encyclopedias cite the initial construction of the documented complex in 1890, followed by formal development between 1905 and 1910 when it operated as a neighborhood quarter mosque (Tajik: масҷиди гузар, masjidi guzar) before expanding into a central congregational mosque (Tajik: масҷиди ҷоме, masjidi jome). The original building was relatively modest, covering only the left portion of the contemporary compound.

Between 1920 and 1943, religious activity was suspended under the anti-religious policies of the Soviet government. The mosque reopened for services in 1944 and has functioned continuously ever since. The first major post-war restoration was carried out in 1956. In the 1980s, an additional prayer hall (khanaqah) and open columned porticoes (ayvans) were added.

Historically, the complex housed the regional Muslim judicial authority (qaziyat) and later the Muftiate. An affiliated madrasa operates within the complex, alongside the administrative offices of the Islamic Center and the Council of Ulema. Depending on courtyard usage and layout, estimates of the site's capacity range from 3,000 worshippers inside the main halls to between 10,000 and 12,000 when the entire open perimeter is occupied.

== Architecture ==
The historic core originally consisted of a modest, single-columned square prayer hall with two covered ayvans along the south and east sides. Its central wooden pillar supported a beamed ceiling divided into four quadrants arranged in a traditional intersecting cross pattern (chorchilik). The central pillar was decorated with rough, traditional woodcarving.

Over subsequent decades, the courtyard was expanded, additional porticoes were erected, and auxiliary service buildings were added. An L-shaped columned portico extends north of the older hall, opening into a second L-shaped beamed prayer hall with a single row of columns. On the eastern side of the courtyard stands a two-story administrative building housing a guesthouse and the reception rooms of the imam-khatib, adjacent to an ablution facility (taharatkhana). The courtyard is paved with decorative herringbone-pattern brickwork, and the gatehouse is crowned by a semicircular arch with an ornamental carved-wood screen (panjara).

The complex represents a significant example of vernacular Central Asian religious architecture, integrating traditional decorative wood carving and brick masonry with modern municipal utilities and telecommunications equipment.

=== Reconstruction and expansion ===
In 1994, during the tenure of Mufti Haji Fathullohkhon Sharifzoda, the old structure was dismantled, and in 1995 a new two-story domed central sanctuary was constructed alongside flanking wings. In 1996, decorative restorations of the interior and exterior facades began under master artisan Usto Said Ikrom of Konibodom.

Under the leadership of Chairman of the Islamic Center Amonulloh Nemat-zoda, the ground-floor prayer hall, interior flooring, and exterior walls were thoroughly refurbished by 2009. Between 2010 and 2014, under Grand Mufti Saidmukarram Abdulqodirzoda, renovations were completed on the basement prayer areas, upper gallery, and ablution facilities, and new roofing was installed across the mosque and administrative headquarters.

== See also ==
- Central Mosque of Dushanbe
- Islam in Tajikistan
