= Islam in Tajikistan =

The Central Mosque of Dushanbe, the largest mosque in Tajikistan

Sects of Islam in Tajikistan (2003)
Religions	percent
Sunni Islam	95%
Shia Islam	3%

Sunni Islam is, by far, the most widely practiced religion in Tajikistan. Sunni Islam of the Hanafi school is the recognized religious tradition of Tajikistan since 2009. According to a 2009 U.S. State Department release, the population of Tajikistan is 98% Muslim, (approximately 95% Sunni and 3% Shia), with some Sufi orders.

== Demographics and early history ==
Islam, the predominant religion of all of Central Asia, was brought to the region by the Arabs in the seventh century. Since that time, Islam has become an integral part of Tajik culture. For instance, the Samanid state became a staunch patron of Islamic architecture and spread the Islamo-Persian culture deep into the heart of Central Asia. Also, Ismail Samani, who is considered the father of the Tajik nation, promoted Muslim missionary efforts around the region. The population within Central Asia began firmly accepting Islam in significant numbers, notably in Taraz, now in modern-day Kazakhstan. Hugo Rudolf von Stumm, a lieutenant in the Westphalian Hussars, who was observing Konstantin Petrovich von Kaufmann's Khivan campaign of 1873, noted that the Tajiks were "rather lax in the observance of the religious precepts of the prophet". During the Soviet era, efforts to secularize society were largely unsuccessful and the post-Soviet era has seen a marked increase in religious practice. The number of Muslims who fast during the holy month of Ramadan is high; up to 99% of Muslims in the countryside and 70% in the cities fasted during the latest month of Ramadan (2025). Most Shia Muslims, particularly the Ismaili, reside in the remote Gorno-Badakhshan region as well as certain districts of the southern Khatlon region and in Dushanbe. Among other religions, the Russian Orthodox faith is practiced only by the Russians living therein, although the Russian community shrank significantly in the early 1990s. Some other small Christian groups now enjoy relative freedom of worship. There also is a very tiny Jewish community.

=== Shi'a Islam ===
The Sunni branch of Islam has a 1,200-year-old tradition among the sedentary population of Central Asia, including the Tajiks. A minority group, the Pamiris, are members of a much smaller denomination of Shia Islam, Nizari Ismailism, which first won adherents in Central Asia in the early tenth century. Despite persecution, Ismailism has survived in the remote Pamir Mountains and they are followers of the Aga Khan. According to the Pew Research Center 2009 census, there are over 400,000 Shia in Tajikistan, representing 7% of Tajikistans population.

== Soviet era ==
The traditional veil in Tajikistan worn before modern times was the faranji but during the Hujum, the Soviet Communists gave women civil rights equal to men, and prohibited the wearing of "oppressive clothing" like veils.

During the course of seven decades of political control, Soviet policy makers were unable to eradicate the Islamic tradition. The harshest of the Soviet anti-Islamic campaigns occurred from the late 1920s to the late 1930s as part of a unionwide drive against religion in general. In this period, many Muslim functionaries were killed, and religious instruction and observance were curtailed sharply. After the German Invasion of the Soviet Union in 1941, official policy toward Islam moderated. One of the changes that ensued was the establishment in 1943 of an officially sanctioned Islamic hierarchy for Central Asia, the Muslim Board of Central Asia. Together with three similar organizations for other regions of the Soviet Union having large Muslim populations, this administration was controlled by the Kremlin, which required loyalty from religious officials. Although its administrative personnel and structure were inadequate to serve the needs of the Muslim population of the region, the administration made possible the legal existence of some Islamic institutions, as well as the activities of religious functionaries, a small number of mosques, and religious instruction at two seminaries in Uzbekistan.

In the early 1960s, Nikita Khrushchev's rule escalated anti-Islamic propaganda. Then, on several occasions in the 1970s and 1980s, the Kremlin leadership called for renewed efforts to combat religion, including Islam. Typically, such campaigns included conversion of mosques to secular use; attempts to reidentify traditional Islamic-linked customs with nationalism rather than religion; and propaganda linking Islam to backwardness, superstition, and bigotry. Official hostility toward Islam grew in 1979 with Soviet military involvement in nearby Afghanistan and the increasing assertiveness of Islamic revivalists in several countries. From that time through the early post-Soviet era, some officials in Moscow and in Tajikistan warned of an extremist Islamic menace. Despite all these efforts, Islam remained an important part of the identity of the Tajiks and other Muslim peoples of Tajikistan through the end of the Soviet era and the first years of independence.

== Recent developments ==
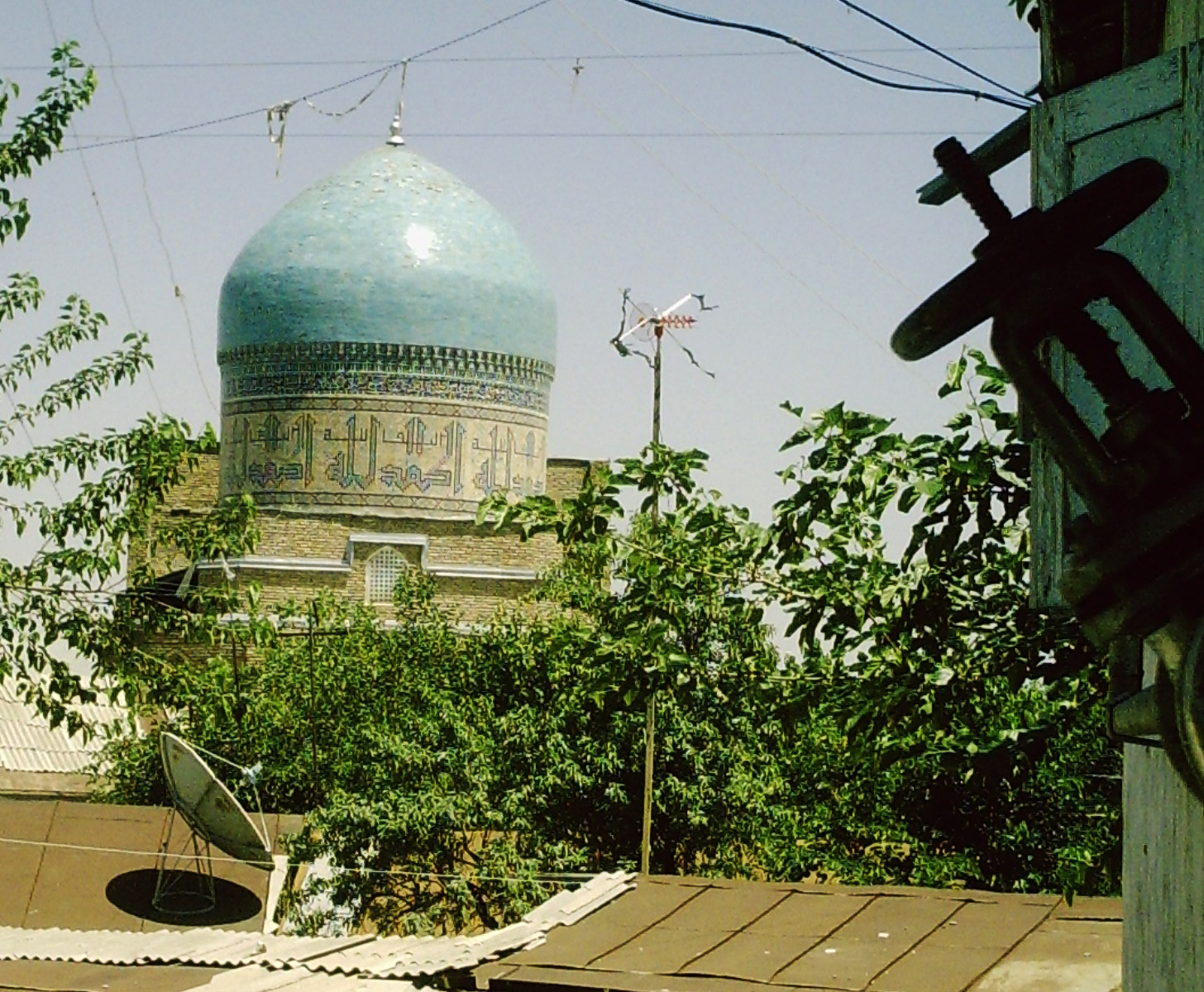
A madrassa in Istarawshan.

In October 2005, Tajikistan's Ministry of Education banned female students from wearing Islamic headscarves in secular schools. Wearing the hijab, or head scarf traditionally worn by Muslim women, and other religious symbols "is unacceptable in secular schools and violates the constitution and a new law on education," Education Minister Abdudjabor Rahmonov said. He expressed concern that pupils spent too much time in mosques at the expense of their education. "Many spend evenings in mosques and do not do their homework," Rahmonov said, adding that during the Islamic holy month of Ramadan many did not attend classes after Friday prayers.

More recently, according to an unconfirmed report, the Tajik government has closed hundreds of unregistered mosques, drawing locals to believe that the crackdown is actually against the religion of Islam. According to reports, some mosques have been destroyed while others have been converted into beauty parlors. Some have speculated that the crackdown is a result of governmental concerns of mosques being "unsafe," or that the imams may not act "responsible."

Tajikistan marked 2009 as the year to commemorate the Sunni Muslim jurist Abu Hanifa, as the nation hosted an international symposium that drew scientific and religious leaders. The construction of one of the largest mosques in the world, funded by Qatar, was announced in October 2009. The mosque was planned to be built in Dushanbe, and construction was finished by 2014. In 2010, Tajikistan hosted a session of the Organisation of the Islamic Conference with delegations from 56 members states gathering at Dushanbe.

Mosques are not permitted to allow women in, only state-controlled religious education is approved for children and long beards are banned in Tajikistan.

In Tajikistan, mosques are banned from allowing Friday prayers for those younger than 18 years old.

The government has shut down mosques and forbids foreign religious education. From the beginning of 2011, 1,500 mosques were shut down by the Tajik government, in addition to banning the hijab for children, banning the use of loudspeakers for the call of prayer, forbidding mosques from allowing women to enter, and monitoring imams and students learning an Islamic education abroad, having sermons in the mosque approved by the government and limiting the mosque sermons to 15 minutes. Muslims experienced the most negative effects from the "Religion Law" enacted by the government of Tajikistan, curtailing sermons by imams during weddings, making the "Cathedral mosques" the only legal place for sermons to be given by imams with sermons not being allowed in five-fold mosques, the five-fold mosques are small mosques and serve a limited number of people while the medium and big mosques are categorized as Cathedral mosques, girls who wore the hijab have been expelled from schools and hijabs and beards are not permitted on passport photos. Mosques have been demolished and shut down by the Tajikistan government on the excuses that they were not registered and therefore not considered as mosques by the government. Tajikistan has targeted religious groups like Jehovah's Witnesses, Jews, Christians, and Muslims who try to evade control by the government, synagogue, churches, and mosques have been shut down and destroyed, only a certain amount of mosques are allowed to operate and the state must approve all "religious activity", in which those younger than 18 years old are not allowed to join in. Buildings for religious worship for Jehovah's Witnesses, Protestant churches, the Jewish Synagogue, and Muslim mosques have been targeted, destroyed, and shut down; and prayers are forbidden to take place in public halls, with severe restrictions placed on religion. Tajikistan forced religious communities to re-register with the government and shut down mosques and churches that refused re-registration in 2009. Churches, a synagogue, and mosques have been destroyed by the Tajikistan government. Government approval is required for Tajiks seeking to engage in religious studies in foreign countries, and religious activities of Muslims in particular are subjected to controls by the Tajikistan government. State control has been implemented on Islamic madrasahs, imams, and mosques by Tajikistan. A list of sermon "topics" for imams has been created by the Tajikistan government. Towns are only allowed to have a certain number of mosques, and only religious buildings sanctioned by the government are allowed to host religious activities. Schools have banned hijab, religious studies in private have been forbidden, mosque religious services are not allowed to admit children and non-registered mosques have been closed. Religious matters are banned for those under 18 year olds, public buildings do not allow beards, schools ban hijabs, unregistered mosques are shut down, and sermons are subjected to government authority. Only if "provided the child expresses a desire to learn" can a family teach religion to their own children, while the Tajik government banned all non-family private education. Islam and Muslims have been subjected to controls by the Tajikistan government, the states decides what sermons the imams give, the government discharges the salaries of imams and there is only a single madrasah in Tajikistan.

Jehovah's Witnesses have been declared illegal in Tajikistan. Abundant Life Christian Centre, Ehyo Protestant Church, and Jehovah's witnesses have accused Tajikistan of lying about them not being declared illegal at a Warsaw OSCE conference for human rights.

Among increasingly religious Tajiks, Islamic-Arabic names have become more popular over Tajik names.

The Tajik government has used the word "prostitute" to label hijab-wearing women and enforced shaving of beards, in addition to considering the outlawing of Arabic-Islamic names for children and making people use Tajik/Persian names. Tajik President Rakhmon (Rahmon) has said that the Persian epic Shahnameh should be used as a source for names, with his proposed law hinting that Muslim names would be forbidden after his anti hijab and anti beard laws.

The black colored Islamic veil was attacked and criticized in public by Tajik President Emomali Rahmon.

The Islamic Renaissance Party of Tajikistan has been banned by the Tajik government and was labeled as a terrorist organization. However, an Islamic Renaissance Party member subsequently visited Iran by the Iranian government, which was turned into a diplomatic protest by Tajikistan.

Tajikistan's restrictions on Islam has resulted in a drastic decrease of big beards and hijabs. Tajikistan bans Salafism under the name "Wahhabi", which is applied to forms of Islam not permitted by the government. To promote a better secular state, 160 Islamic clothing stores were shuttered and 13,000 men were forcibly shaved by the Tajik police and Arabic names were banned by the parliament of Tajikistan as part of a secularist campaign by President Emomali Rajmon.

In Uzbekistan and Tajikistan, women were required at times to wear veils which covered their entire face and body like the paranja and faranji, although this was mostly adhered to only in urban areas. The traditional veil in Central Asia, the faranji, was banned by the Soviets.

== See also ==
- Bibliography of Tajikistani history
- Islam by country
- Shi'a Islam in Tajikistan
- Demographics of Tajikistan
- Religion in Tajikistan
- Mir Sayyid Ali Hamadani
