= Shia Islam in Tajikistan =

Shi'a Islam is practiced by a small percentage of the population of Tajikistan. According to the 2009 U.S. State Department report, the proportion of Shi'a Islam practitioners in Tajikistan is 3%, compared to 95% for Sunni Islam. The base of the Shi'a population in Tajikistan are the Pamiris, who practice Nizari Ismailism. This variant of Shi'a Islam holds that there is an unbroken chain of living imams down to the present day, currently represented by the Aga Khan, the 49th imam. The Pamiri Ismaili homeland is in Gorno-Badakhshan in Tajikistan's mountainous east alongside the border with Xinjiang, with their spiritual and cultural capital in the city of Khorugh.
