= Imam Abu Hanifa Cathedral Mosque =

Mosque in Dushanbe, Tajikistan

Imam Abu Hanifa Cathedral Mosque of Dushanbe
- Масҷиди марказии ҷомеи шаҳри Душанбе ба номи Абуҳанифа Имоми Аъзам Нӯъмон ибни Собит (Tajik); Центральная соборная мечеть Душанбе им. Абуханифа Имам Аъзам (Russian)
- The mosque in 2025

Religion
- Affiliation: Sunni Islam
- Rite: Hanafi
- Ownership: Government of Tajikistan
- Status: Active
- Named after: Abu Hanifa

Location
- Location: Dushanbe, Tajikistan
- Interactive map of Imam Abu Hanifa Cathedral Mosque of Dushanbe
- Coordinates: 38°35′44.401″N 68°45′47.099″E

Architecture
- Architect: Eng. Adnan Saffarini Office
- Type: Islamic architecture
- Groundbreaking: 5 October 2009
- Completed: 8 June 2023
- Construction cost: $100 million
- Capacity: 133,000

The Central Mosque of Dushanbe, officially the Imam Abu Hanifa Cathedral Mosque of Dushanbe (Tajik: Масҷиди марказии ҷомеи шаҳри Душанбе ба номи Абуҳанифа Имоми Аъзам Нӯъмон ибни Собит, Russian: Центральная соборная мечеть Душанбе им. Абуханифа Имам Аъзам), is a congregational mosque on the northern outskirts of Dushanbe, Tajikistan. It is the largest religious building constructed in Tajikistan since independence in 1991, and is often described as the largest mosque in Central Asia.

It was officially opened on 8 June 2023, by the President of Tajikistan, Emomali Rahmon, and the Emir of Qatar, Tamin bin Hamad Al-Thani. It can accommodate more than 133,000 congregants at a time.

== History ==
In 2007, Qatar and Tajikistan signed an initial agreement to build a mosque in Tajikistan. President Emomali Rahmon laid the foundation stone for the mosque on 5 October 2009, during commemorations of the 1,310th anniversary of the birth of Abu Hanifa, founder of the Hanafi school of jurisprudence.

Construction by OJSC STS Inshot and OJSC Somon Equipment began on 5 October 2011, under the guidance of Tajik and Qatari specialists. The project costed almost US$100 million, of which the Government of Qatar contributed US$70 million, and the remainder was provided by the Government of Tajikistan. An inauguration attended by Rahmon and the Emir of Qatar was initially scheduled for August 2020, but was postponed because of the COVID-19 pandemic. The mosque was eventually officially opened on 8 June 2023.

== Description ==
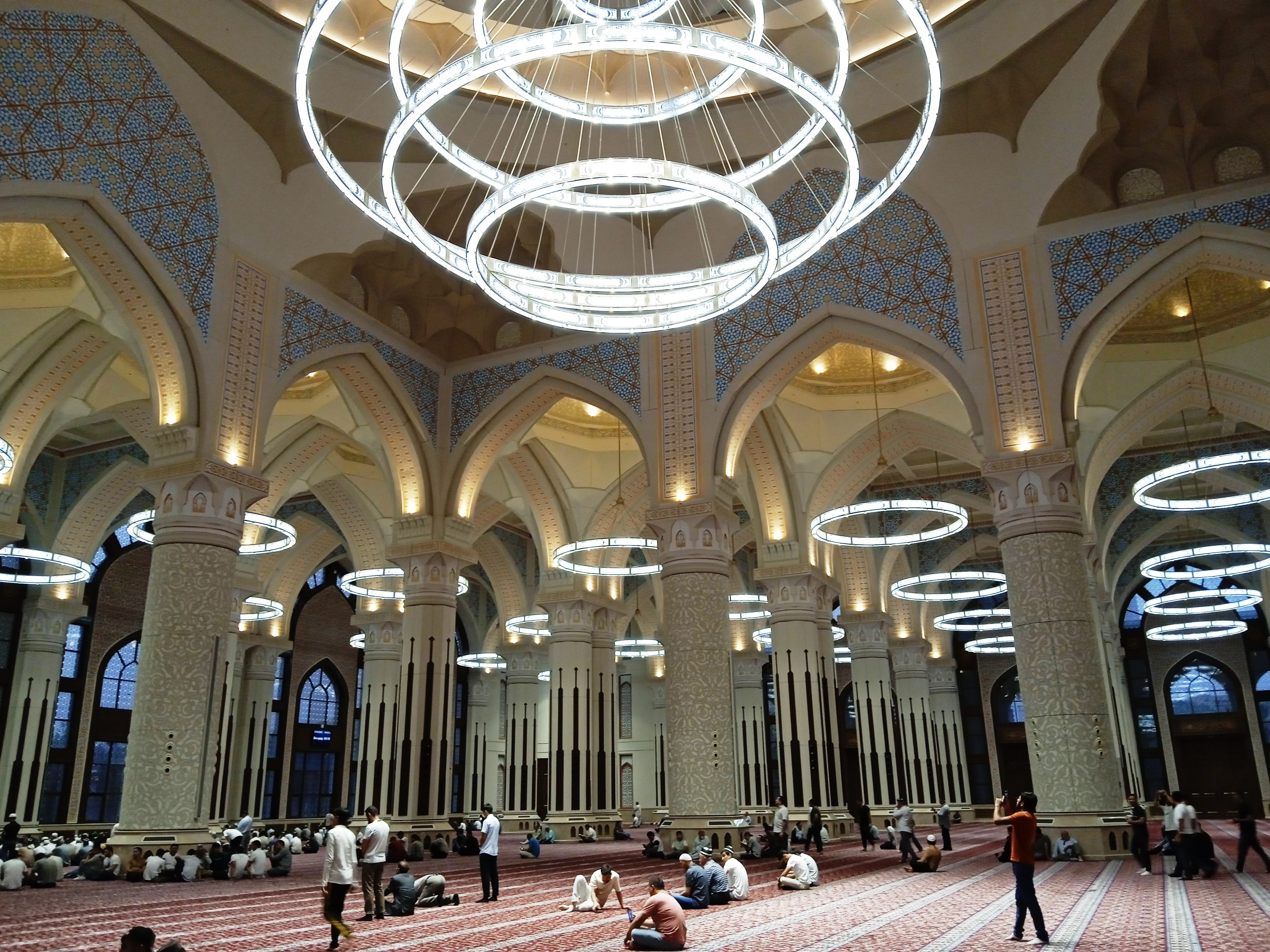
The interior of the mosque, taken in 2023

The mosque can accommodate 133,000 worshippers at a time, 43,000 of whom can be inside the mosque and the rest around it. The mihrab (a niche in the mosque wall indicating the direction of Mecca) is located in the southwest corner of the prayer hall.

The mosque stands within a complex of around 12 hectares. In addition to the prayer halls, the complex contains two libraries, a museum, a conference hall, administrative buildings, a dining hall, and a car park for around 4,000 vehicles. The mosque has four 75m high minarets, and is surrounded by 20 smaller domes, with its main dome rising to a height of 47m.
