= Tajikistan =

Landlocked country in Central Asia

Republic of Tajikistan Ҷумҳурии Тоҷикистон (Tajik) Республика Таджикистан (Russian)
- Flag Emblem
- Motto: Истиқлол, Озодӣ, Ватан (Tajik); Istiqlol, Ozodī, Vatan; Независимость, Свобода, Родина (Russian); Nezavisimost', Svoboda, Rodina "Independence, Freedom, Homeland"
- Anthem: Суруди Миллӣ (Tajik); Surudi Milli "National Anthem"
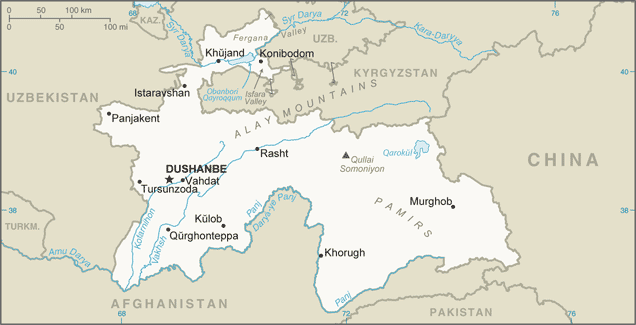
- Capital and largest city: Dushanbe; 38°33′N 68°48′E
- Official languages: Tajik; Russian (Note: Article 2 of Constitution: The state language of Tajikistan shall be Tajik. Russian is the language of communication between the nationalities. All nations and nationalities living on the territory of the Republic have the right to freely use their native language.)
- Common languages: Uzbek
- Ethnic groups (2020): 86.1% Tajiks; 11.3% Uzbeks; 0.4% Kyrgyz; 0.3% Russians; 1.9% other
- Religion (2025): 97.58% Islam; 87.86% Sunni; 9.72% Shi’a; 0.58% Christianity; 1.64% irreligion; 0.2% others
- Demonyms: Tajikistani; Tajik
- Government: Unitary presidential republic (Note: Even though an executive president co-exists with a prime minister, multiple sources have still described Tajikistan as a presidential republic with the president serving as both head of state and head of government.) under an authoritarian dictatorship
  - President: Emomali Rahmon
  - Prime Minister: Qohir Rasulzoda
- Legislature: Supreme Assembly
  - Upper house: National Assembly
  - Lower house: Assembly of Representatives

Independence from the Soviet Union
  - Soviet annexation: 5 December 1929
  - Independence declared: 9 September 1991
  - Independence recognised: 26 December 1991

Area
  - Total: 143,100 km^{2} (55,300 sq mi) (94th)
  - Water: 2,575 km^{2} (994 sq mi)
  - Water (%): 1.8

Population
  - 2025 estimate: ▲10,786,734
  - Density: 75.4/km^{2} (195.3/sq mi)
- GDP (PPP): 2026 estimate
  - Total: ▲$69.67 billion (121th)
  - Per capita: ▲$6,616 (148th)
- GDP (nominal): 2026 estimate
  - Total: ▲$20.41 billion (133th)
  - Per capita: ▲$1,930 (156th)
- Gini (2015): 34 medium inequality
- HDI (2023): ▲0.691 medium (128th)
- Currency: Somoni (TJS)
- Time zone: UTC+5 (TJT)
- Date format: dd.mm.yyyy
- Calling code: +992
- ISO 3166 code: TJ
- Internet TLD: .tj

Tajikistan, (Note: /tɑːˈdʒiːkɪstɑːn/, /tə-, tæ-/; Tajik: Тоҷикистон, romanized: Tojikiston, lit. 'Land of the Tajiks', pronounced [tʰɔdʒɪkʰɪsˈtʰɔn]) officially the Republic of Tajikistan, (Note: Tajik: Ҷумҳурии Тоҷикистон, romanised: Jumhurii Tojikiston, pronounced [dʒʊmhʊˈɾijɪ tʰɔdʒɪkʰɪsˈtʰɔn]) is a landlocked country in Central Asia. Dushanbe, its capital, is its largest and most populous city, with a population of over 1.2 million. Tajikistan borders Afghanistan to the south, Uzbekistan to the west, Kyrgyzstan to the north, and China to the east; it is narrowly separated from Pakistan by Afghanistan's Wakhan Corridor. Its total population exceeds 11 million.

The territory was previously home to cultures of the Neolithic and the Bronze Age, including the Oxus civilisation in the west. Parts of the country formed part of the Sogdian and Bactrian civilisations and were ruled by the Achaemenids, Alexander the Great, the Greco-Bactrians, the Kushans, the Kidarites, the Hephthalites, the First Turkic Khaganate, the Umayyad and Abbasid Caliphates, the Samanid Empire, the Kara-Khanids, the Seljuks, the Khwarazmians, the Mongols, the Timurids, and the Khanate of Bukhara. The region was later conquered by the Russian Empire, before becoming part of the Soviet Union. Within the Soviet Union, the country's borders were drawn while it was part of Uzbekistan as the Tajik ASSR, before it became a constituent republic of the Soviet Union on 5 December 1929.

On 9 September 1991, Tajikistan declared itself an independent sovereign state as the Soviet Union was disintegrating. A civil war was fought after independence, lasting from May 1992 to June 1997. Since the end of the war, newly established political stability and foreign aid have allowed the country's economy to grow. The country has been led since 1994 by Emomali Rahmon, who heads an authoritarian regime and whose human rights record has been criticised.

Tajikistan is a presidential republic consisting of four provinces. Tajiks form the ethnic majority in the country, and their national language is Tajik. Russian is used as the official inter-ethnic language. While the state is constitutionally secular, Islam is nominally adhered to by 97.5% of the population. In the Gorno-Badakhshan oblast, there is considerable linguistic diversity, with languages such as Rushani, Shughni, Ishkashimi, Wakhi, and Tajik being spoken. Mountains cover more than 90% of the country. It is a developing country with a transitional economy that is dependent on remittances and on the production of aluminium and cotton. Tajikistan is a member of the United Nations, CIS, OSCE, OIC, ECO, SCO, and CSTO, and is a NATO PfP partner.

== Etymology ==
The term 'Tajik' ultimately derives from the Middle Persian Tāzīk, the Turkic rendition of the Arabic ethnonym Ṭayyi’, denoting a Qahtanite Arab tribe that migrated to the Transoxiana region of Central Asia in the 7th century CE. Before 1991, Tajikistan appeared in English as Tadjikistan or Tadzhikistan. This is owing to a transliteration from the Russian: "Таджикистан". In Russian, there is no single letter 'j' to represent the phoneme /d͡ʒ/; instead, дж (transliterated as dzh) is used. Tadzhikistan is an alternative spelling and is found in English‑language literature derived from Russian sources.

== History ==
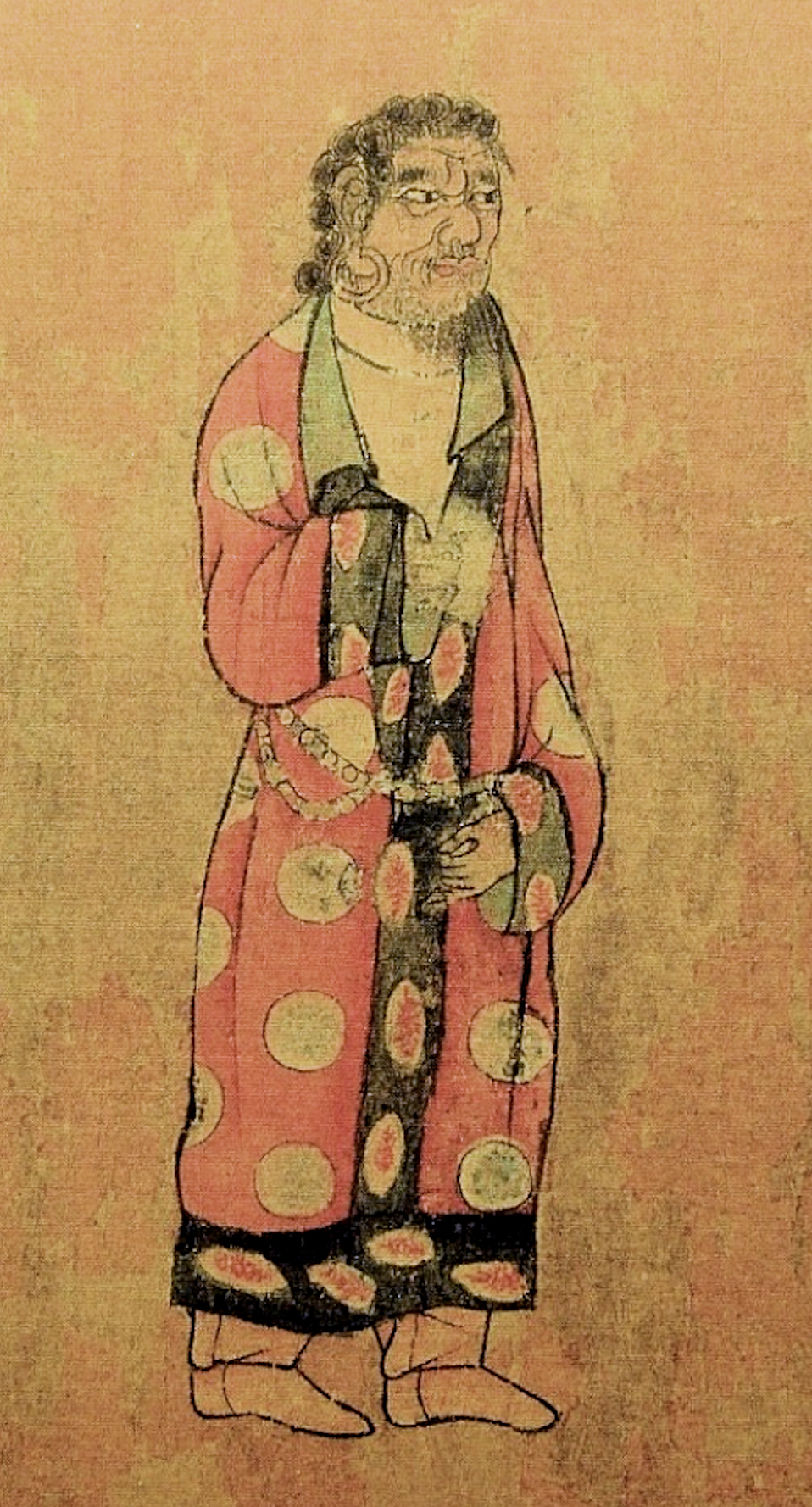
Ambassador to the Tang dynasty, coming from Kumedh (胡密丹). Wanghuitu circa 650 CE.

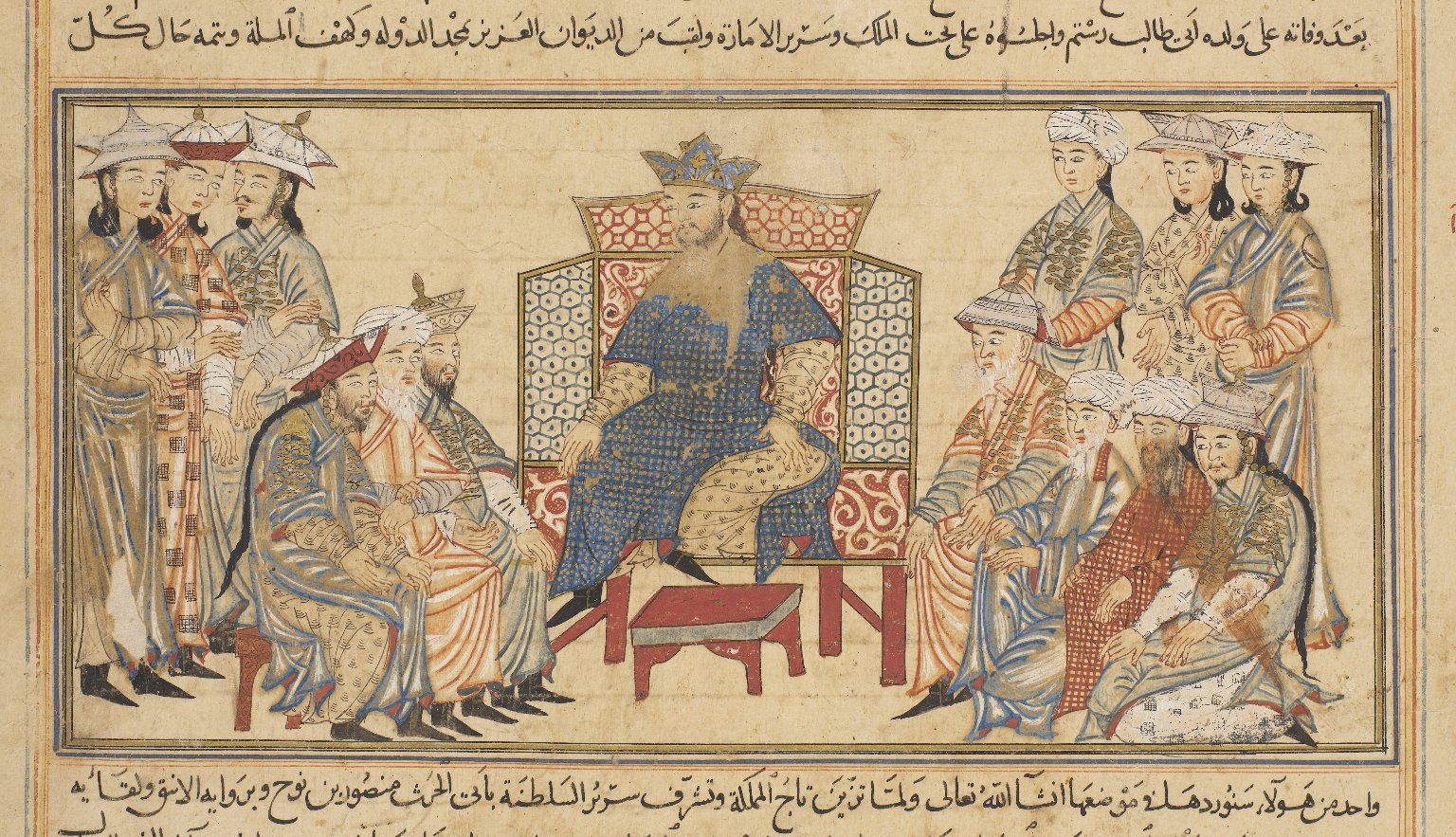
The Samanid ruler Mansur I (961–976)

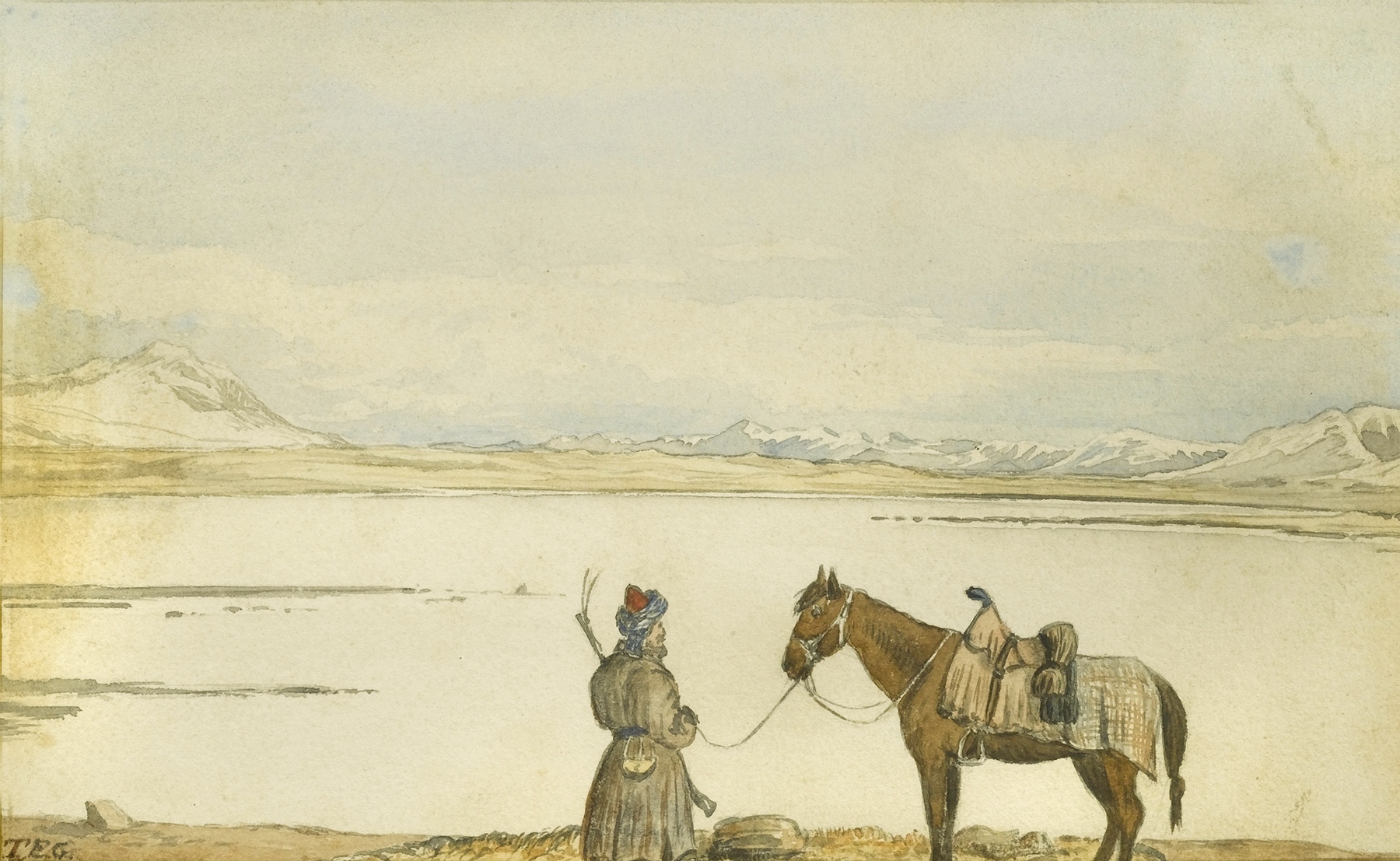
19th-century painting of lake Zorkul and a local Tajik inhabitant

Cultures in the region have been dated back to at least the fourth millennium BCE, including the Bronze Age Bactria–Margiana Archaeological Complex, the Andronovo culture and the pro-urban site of Sarazm, a UNESCO World Heritage Site.

The earliest recorded history of the region dates back to about 500 BCE when most, if not all, of Tajikistan was a part of the Achaemenid Empire. Some authors have suggested that in the seventh and sixth centuries BC parts of Tajikistan, including territories in the Zeravshan Valley, formed part of the Kambojas before they became part of the Achaemenid Empire. After the conquest by Alexander the Great the region became part of the Greco-Bactrian Kingdom, a successor state of Alexander's empire. Northern Tajikistan (the cities of Khujand and Panjakent) was a part of Sogdiana, a collection of city-states which were overrun by Scytho-Siberians and Yuezhi nomadic tribes around 150 BCE. The Silk Road passed through the region and following the expedition of Chinese explorer Zhang Qian during the reign of Wudi (141 BCE – 87 BCE) commercial relations between Han Empire and Sogdiana flourished. Sogdians played a role in facilitating trade and worked in other capacities, as farmers, carpetweavers, glassmakers, and woodcarvers.

The Kushan Empire, a collection of Yuezhi tribes, took control of the region in the first century CE and ruled until the fourth century CE during which time Buddhism, Nestorian Christianity, Zoroastrianism, and Manichaeism were practised in the region. Later the Hephthalite Empire, a collection of nomadic tribes, moved into the region, and the Arabs propagated Islam in the eighth century.

=== Medieval ===
Four brothers – Nuh, Ahmad, Yahya, and Ilyas – founded the Samanid Empire. Each of them ruled territory under Abbasid suzerainty. In 892, Ismail Samani (892–907) united the Samanid state under a single ruler, thereby putting an end to the feudal system that had previously prevailed. It was under his rule that the Samanids became independent of Abbasid authority. The Samanid Empire (819–999) restored Persian control of the region and developed the cities of Samarkand and Bukhara, which became the cultural centres of the Iranian world; the region was known as Khorasan. The empire was centred on Khorasan and Transoxiana, and at its greatest extent encompassed Afghanistan, parts of Iran, Tajikistan, Turkmenistan, Uzbekistan, Kyrgyzstan, parts of Kazakhstan, and Pakistan.

The Samanids revived Persian culture by patronising Rudaki, Bal'ami, and Daqiqi. The Samanids actively promoted Sunni Islam and suppressed Isma'ili Shi'ism, but were more tolerant of Twelver Shi'ism. Islamic architecture and Perso‑Islamic culture were spread deep into the heartlands of Central Asia by the Samanids. Following the first complete translation of the Qur'an into Persian in the 9th century, populations under the Samanid Empire began to accept Islam in significant numbers.

The Karluk Turkic Kara-Khanid Khanate conquered Transoxania (which corresponded approximately to what would later become Uzbekistan, Tajikistan, southern Kyrgyzstan, and south‑west Kazakhstan) and ruled there from 999 to 1211. Their arrival in Transoxania marked a definitive shift from Iranian to Turkic predominance in Central Asia. Over time, the Kara‑Khanids became assimilated into the Perso‑Arab Muslim culture of the region.

The region was later ruled by the Ghurid and Kart dynasties, both of Tajik origin. While the Kart dynasty ruled in present‑day Afghanistan, Muhammad of Ghor, a ruler of the Ghurid dynasty, conquered large parts of India.

In the 13th century, the Mongol Empire swept through Central Asia, invaded the Khwarezmian Empire, and sacked its cities, looting and massacring their inhabitants. The Turco‑Mongol conqueror Tamerlane founded the Timurid Empire, becoming the first ruler of the Timurid dynasty in what later became Tajikistan and Central Asia.

=== Early modern ===
The territory that later became Tajikistan came under the rule of the Khanate of Bukhara during the 16th century. Following the khanate's collapse in the 18th century, the region fell under the control of the Emirate of Bukhara and the Khanate of Kokand. The Emirate of Bukhara remained intact until the 20th century.

=== Modern ===
==== Imperial Russia ====
During the 19th century, the Russian Empire began to conquer parts of the region. Russian Imperialism led to the Russian Empire's conquest of Central Asia during the 19th century's Imperial Era. Between 1864 and 1885, Russia gradually took control of the entire territory of Russian Turkestan, the Tajikistan portion of which had been controlled by the Emirate of Bukhara and Khanate of Kokand. Russia was interested in gaining access to a supply of cotton and in the 1870s attempted to switch cultivation in the region from grain to cotton (a strategy later copied and expanded by the Soviets).

During the 19th century, the Jadidists established themselves as an Islamic social movement throughout the region. While the Jadidists were pro-modernisation and not necessarily anti-Russian, the Russians viewed the movement as a threat because the Russian Empire was predominantly Christian. Russian troops were required to restore order during uprisings against the Khanate of Kokand between 1910 and 1913. Further violence occurred in July 1916 when demonstrators attacked Russian soldiers in Khujand over the threat of forced conscription during World War I. While Russian troops brought Khujand back under control, clashes continued throughout the year in various locations in Tajikistan.

==== Soviet period ====
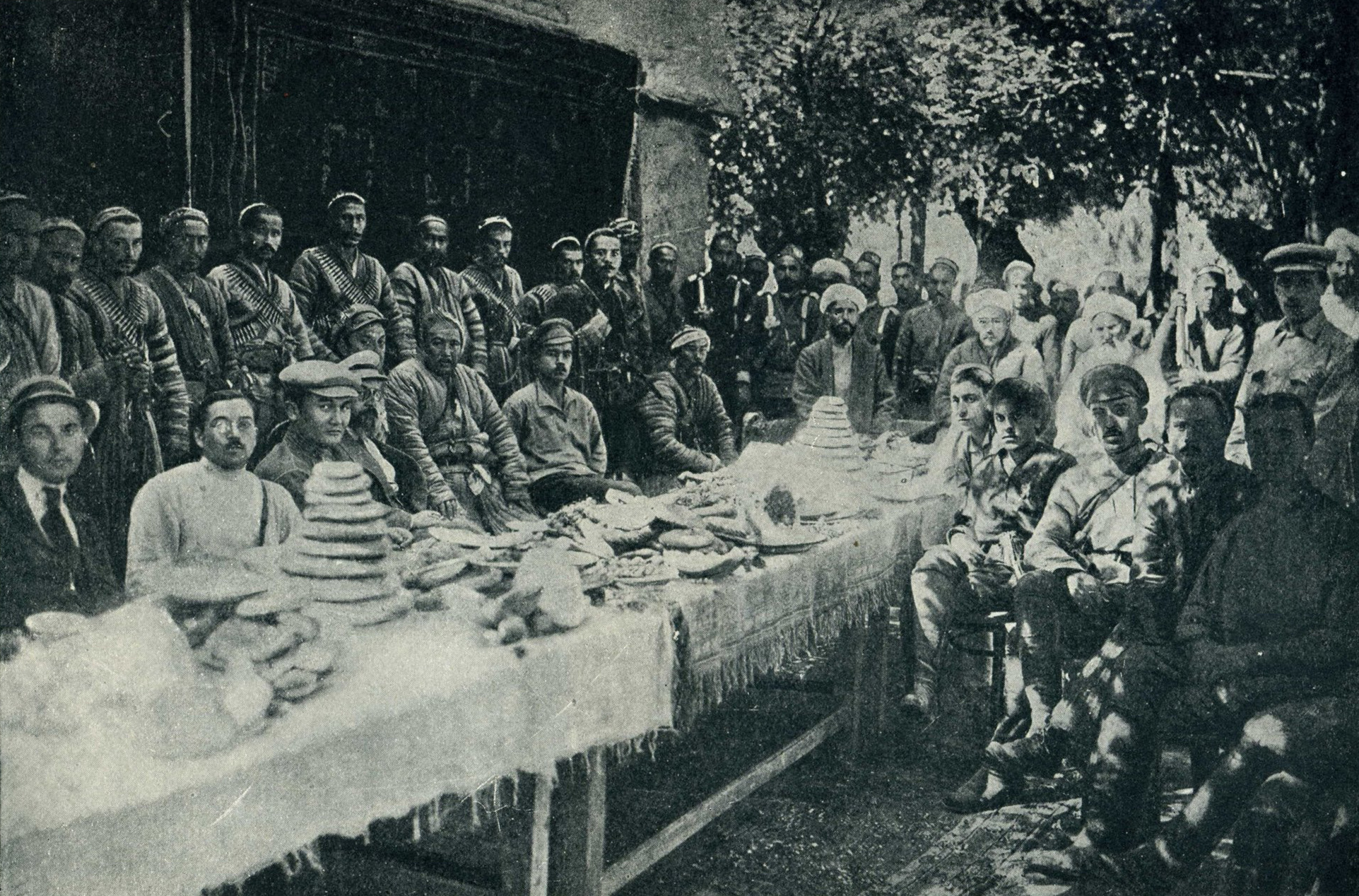
Soviet negotiations with basmachi, 1921

After the Russian Revolution of 1917, guerrillas throughout Central Asia, known as basmachi, waged a war against Bolshevik armies in an attempt to maintain independence. The Bolsheviks prevailed after a four‑year war, during which mosques and villages were burned down and the population was suppressed.

Between 1928 and 1941, Soviet authorities began an anti‑religious campaign of secularisation. Practising Christianity, Islam, or Judaism was discouraged and repressed; under Soviet anti-religious legislation, several churches, mosques, and synagogues were closed. As a consequence of the conflict and Soviet agricultural policies, Central Asia, including Tajikistan, suffered a famine that claimed many lives.

Tajikistan was first created in 1924 as the Tajik Autonomous Soviet Socialist Republic (abbreviated as the Tajik ASSR), an autonomous republic within the Uzbek Soviet Socialist Republic. Despite their historical status as Tajik cities and their largely Tajik populations, none of the regional urban centres – such as Bukhara, Samarkand, Tirmiz, Qarshi, and Khojand – were included in Tajikistan. Instead, the Tajikistani capital was established in Dushanbe, a mountain town with approximately 1,000 residents.

A specific Persian dialect, with vocabulary and pronunciation distinct from formal written Persian, was deliberately made the national language of Tajikistan by the Soviets and renamed 'Tajiki' in order to forcibly separate it from the common variant of Persian spoken from Istanbul to Calcutta. The Tajiks were also excluded from the enormous global world of Persian literature, both past and present, by the creation of a new phonetic alphabet – first Latin‑based in 1928 and later Cyrillic in 1940. With Persian confined to Tajikistan and replaced by Russian as Central Asia's common language, the unity of the Persianate world was broken, steering Soviet and post‑Soviet Central Asia on to a developmental path distinct from that of Iran and Afghanistan. In 1929, the Tajik ASSR was elevated to its own full union republic, the Tajik Soviet Socialist Republic. The Sughd Region, including Khojand, was added to Tajikistan in the same year.

Between 1927 and 1934, collectivisation of agriculture and an expansion of cotton production took place, especially in the southern region. Soviet collectivization policy brought violence against farmers and peasants, classified as anti-Soviet categories of "enemies of the people", and forced resettlement occurred throughout Tajikistan. Consequently, some peasants fought collectivisation and revived the Basmachi movement. Some industrial development occurred during this time along with the expansion of irrigation infrastructure.

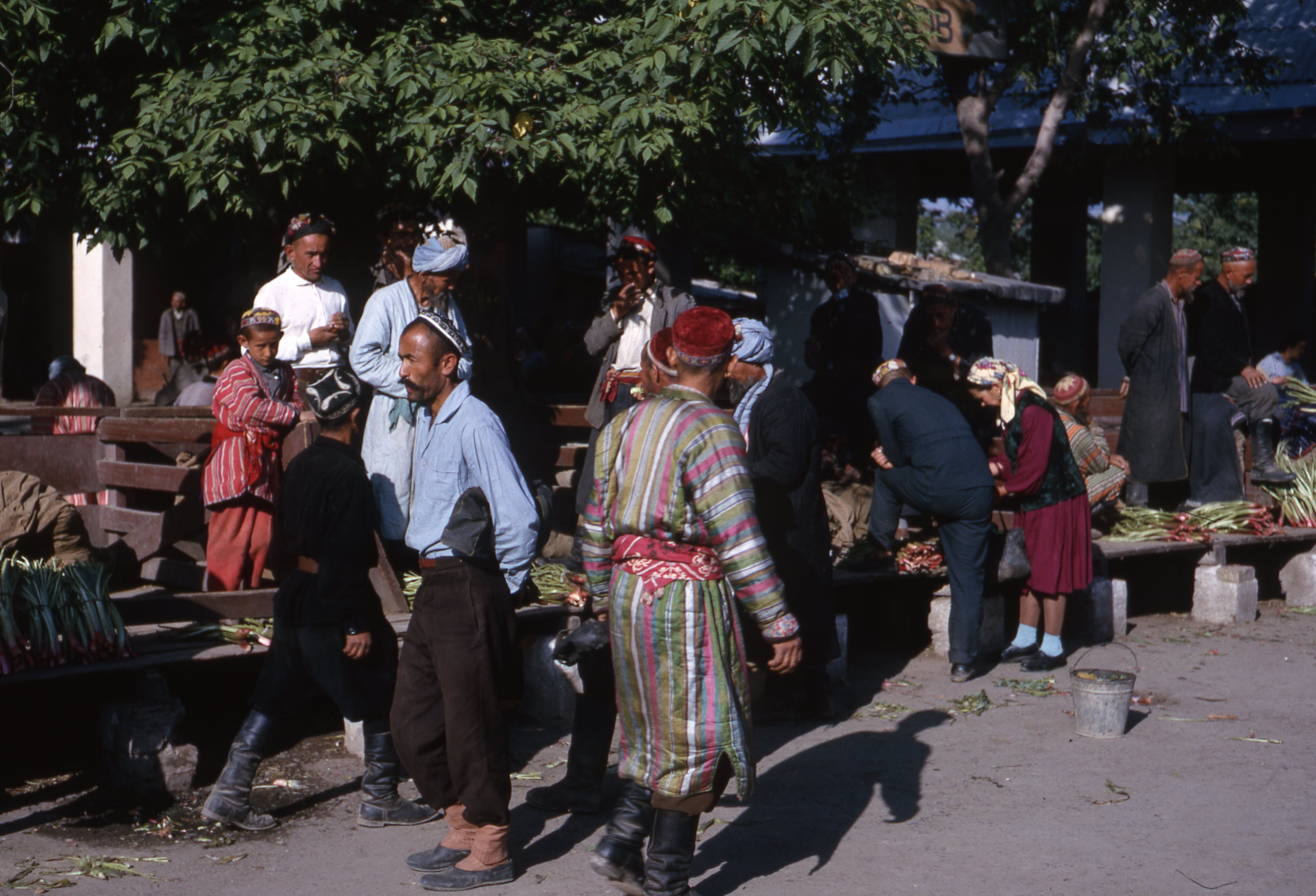
Soviet Tajikistan in 1964

Two rounds of Stalin's purges (1927–1934 and 1937–1938) resulted in the expulsion of nearly 10,000 people from all levels of the Communist Party of Tajikistan. Ethnic Russians were sent in to replace those expelled and subsequently Russians dominated party positions at all levels, including the top position of first secretary. Between 1926 and 1959 the proportion of Russians among Tajikistan's population grew from less than 1% to 13%. Bobojon Ghafurov, First Secretary of the Communist Party of Tajikistan from 1946 to 1956, was the only Tajik politician of significance outside of the republic during the Soviet Era.

Tajiks began to be conscripted into the Red Army in 1939, and during the Second World War around 260,000 Tajik citizens fought against Nazi Germany, Finland, and the Empire of Japan. Between 60,000 (4%) and 120,000 (8%) of Tajikistan's 1,530,000 citizens were killed during the war.

Following the war and the end of Stalin's rule, attempts were made to further expand the agriculture and industry of Tajikistan. During 1957–58, Nikita Khrushchev's Virgin Lands Campaign focused attention on Tajikistan, where living conditions, education, and industry lagged behind those of the other Soviet republics. In the 1980s, Tajikistan had the lowest household saving rate in the USSR, the lowest percentage of households in the two top per capita income groups, and the lowest rate of university graduates per 1,000 people.

By the 1980s, Tajik nationalists were calling for increased rights. Real disturbances did not occur within the republic until 1990. The following year, the Soviet Union collapsed, and Tajikistan declared its independence on 9 September 1991, a day which is celebrated as the country's Independence Day.

=== Independence ===
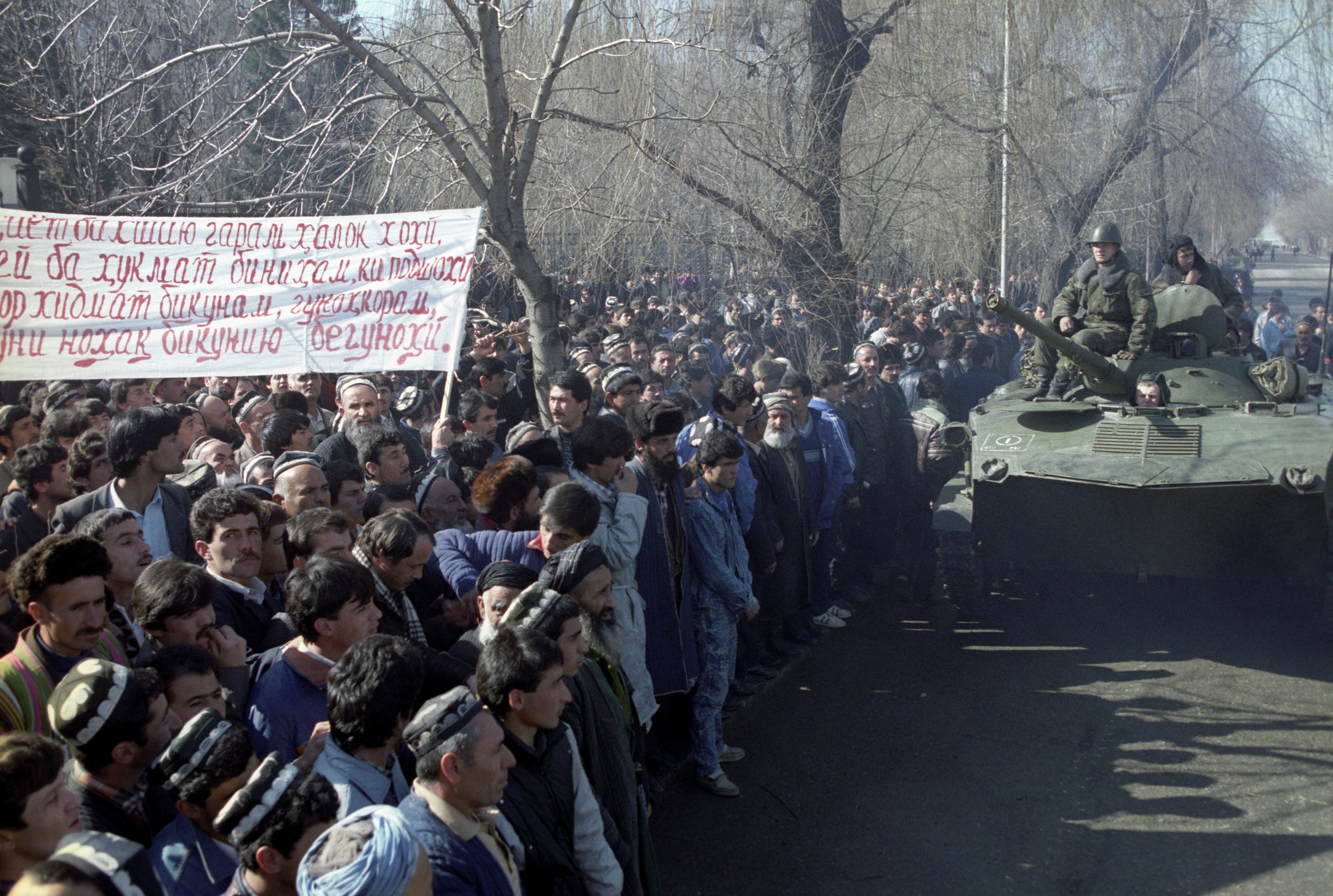
1990 Dushanbe riots

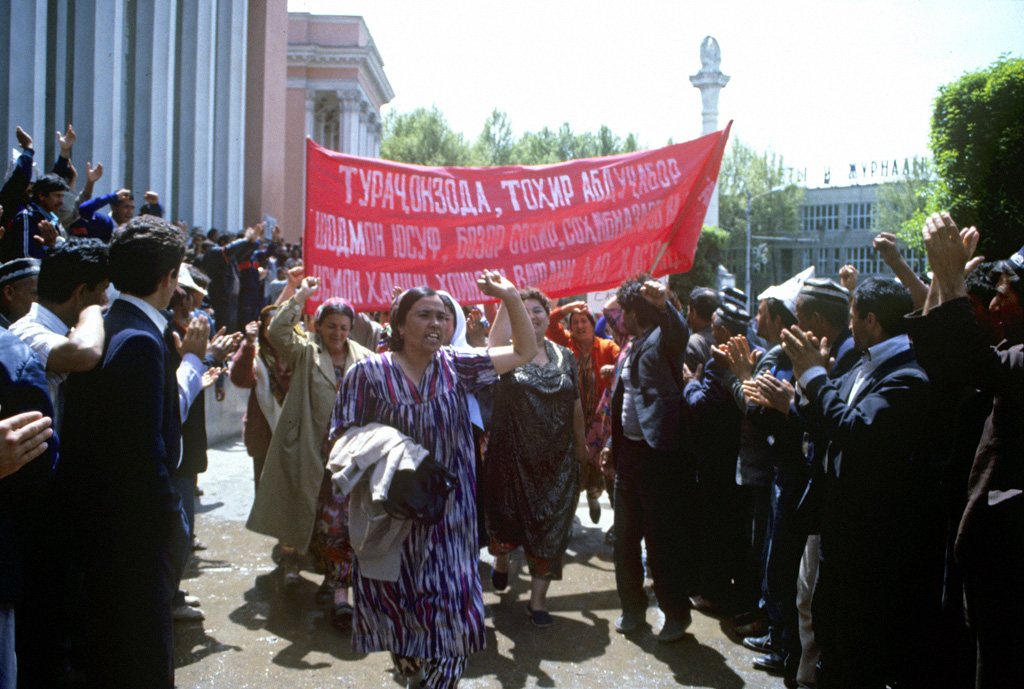
Tajik men and women rally on Ozodi square in Dushanbe after independence, 1992.

In February 1990, riots and strikes in Dushanbe and other cities began because of the difficult socio‑economic situation, a shortage of housing, and youth unemployment. The nationalist and democratic opposition, along with supporters of independence, joined the strikes and began to demand the independence of the republic and democratic reforms. Islamists also began to hold strikes to demand respect for their rights and independence. The Soviet leadership introduced Internal Troops in Dushanbe to put an end to the unrest.

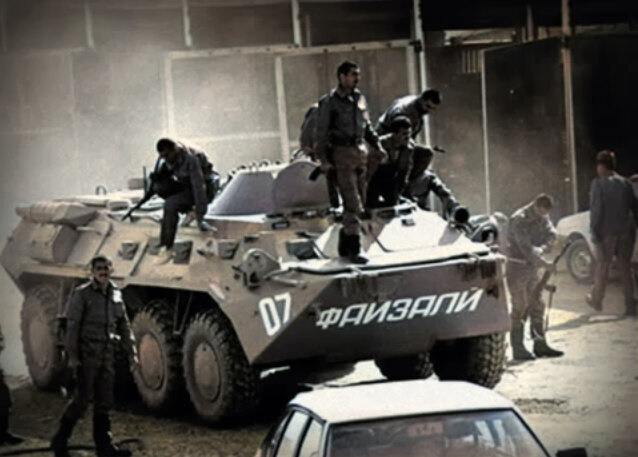
Spetsnaz soldiers during the civil war, 1992

Following independence, the nation fell into civil war among factions distinguished by clan loyalties. Regional groups from the Gharm and Gorno-Badakhshan regions of Tajikistan, led by a combination of liberal democratic reformers and Islamists, who eventually became the United Tajik Opposition, rose up against the newly formed government of President Rahmon Nabiyev, which was dominated by people from the Khujand and Kulob regions.

The war lasted until 1997. More than 500,000 residents fled during this time because of persecution and increased poverty, seeking better economic opportunities in the West or in other former Soviet republics. The estimated number of dead exceeded 100,000. Around 1.2 million people were refugees, both inside and outside the country.

Emomali Rahmon came to power in the early part of this conflict in 1992, after Nabiyev was forced at gunpoint on 7 September 1992 to resign from office. Rahmon defeated the former prime minister Abdumalik Abdullajanov in a presidential election in November with 58% of the vote.

In 1997, a ceasefire was reached between Rahmon and opposition parties under the guidance of Gerd D. Merrem, Special Representative to the Secretary General, a result praised as a successful United Nations peacekeeping initiative. The ceasefire guaranteed 30% of ministerial positions would go to the opposition. Elections were held in 1999 and were criticised by opposition parties and foreign observers as unfair; Rahmon was re-elected with 98% of the vote. Elections in 2006 were again won by Rahmon (with 79% of the vote) and he began his third term in office. Opposition parties boycotted the 2006 election and the Organization for Security and Cooperation in Europe (OSCE) criticised it, while observers from the Commonwealth of Independent States claimed the elections were legal and transparent.

Rahmon's administration came under further criticism from OSCE in October 2010 for its censorship and repression of the media. OSCE claimed that the Tajik Government censored Tajik and foreign websites and instituted tax inspections on independent printing houses that led to the cessation of printing activities for a number of independent newspapers.

Russian border troops were stationed along the Tajik–Afghan border until summer 2005. Since the September 11, 2001 attacks, French troops have been stationed at Dushanbe Airport in support of air operations of NATO's International Security Assistance Force in Afghanistan. United States Army and Marine Corps personnel periodically visit Tajikistan to conduct joint training missions of up to several weeks' duration. The Government of India rebuilt the Ayni Air Base, a military airport located 15 km southwest of Dushanbe, at a cost of $70 million, completing the repairs in September 2010. It is the main base of the Tajikistan Air Force. There have been talks with Russia concerning use of the Ayni facility, and Russia continues to maintain a base on the outskirts of Dushanbe.

In 2010, there were concerns among Tajik officials that Islamic militarism in the east of the country was on the rise following the escape of 25 militants from a Tajik prison in August, an ambush that killed 28 Tajik soldiers in the Rasht Valley in September, and another ambush in the valley in October that killed 30 soldiers, followed by fighting outside Gharm that left three militants dead. The country's Interior Ministry insisted that the central government maintained full control over the country's east, and the military operation in the Rasht Valley was concluded in November 2010.

Fighting erupted again, this time in and around Gorno-Badakhshan, in July 2012. In 2015, Russia sent more troops to Tajikistan.

In May 2015, Tajikistan's national security underwent a setback when Colonel Gulmurod Khalimov, commander of the special-purpose police unit (OMON) of the Interior Ministry, defected to the Islamic State. Khalimov was allegedly killed on 8 September 2017 during a Russian airstrike near Deir ez-Zor, Syria, although Tajikistan authorities express doubts whether he has died.

In 2021, following the Fall of Kabul, Tajikistan allegedly got involved in the Panjshir conflict against the Taliban on the side of the National Resistance Front of Afghanistan.

In September 2022 armed clashes, including the use of artillery, erupted along most of the border between Kyrgyzstan and Tajikistan.

== Politics ==
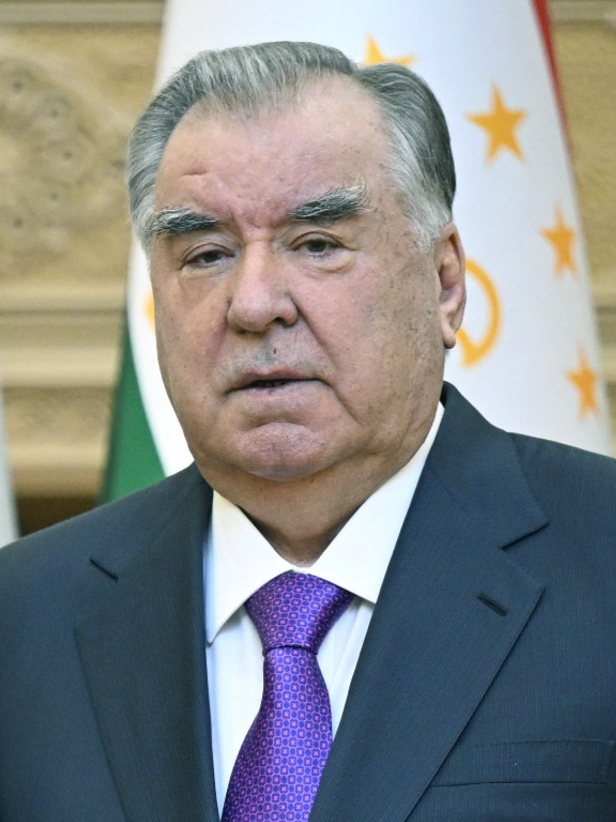
Emomali Rahmon
President

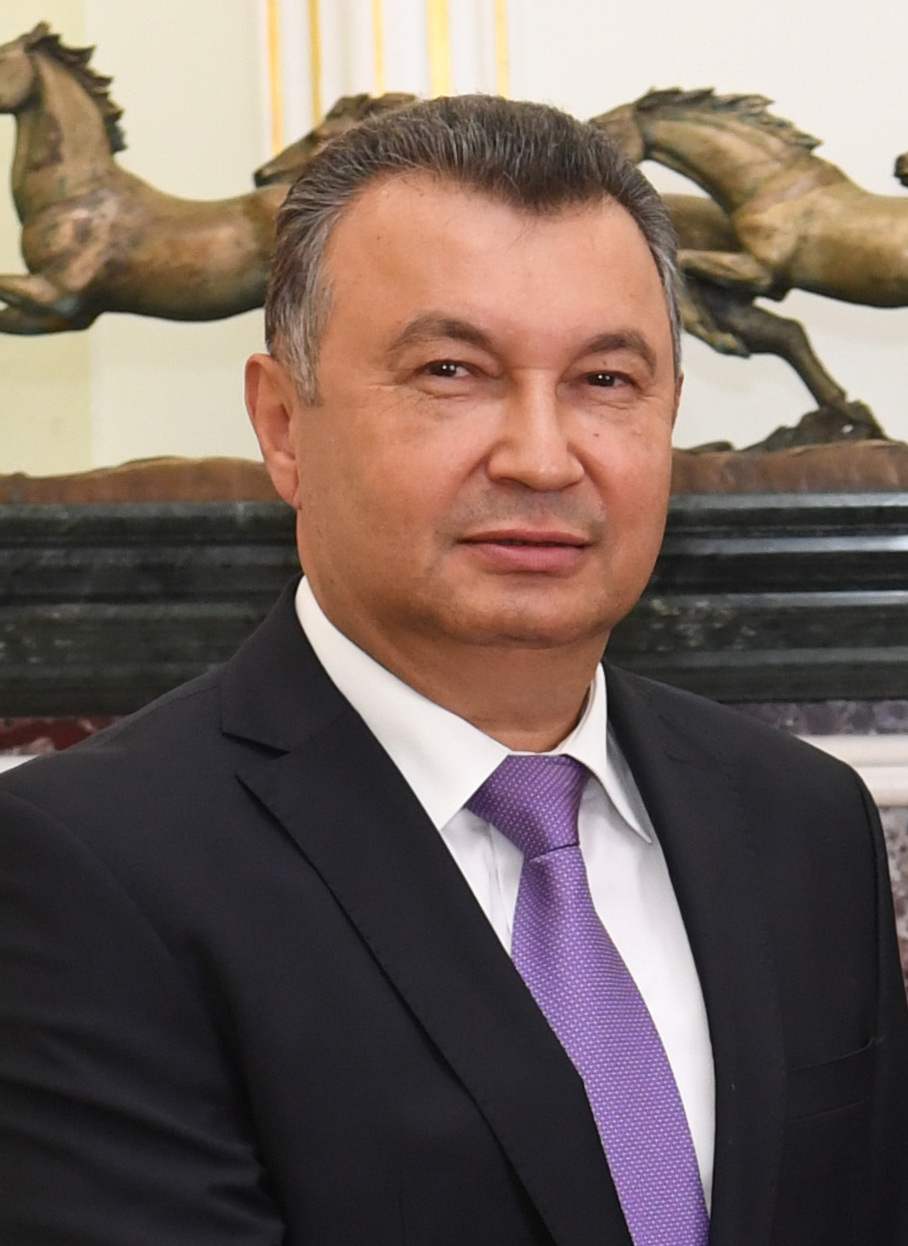
Qohir Rasulzoda
Prime Minister

The Palace of Nations in Dushanbe

After independence, Tajikistan was plunged into a civil war. Factions were supported by foreign countries including Afghanistan, Iran, Pakistan, Uzbekistan and Russia. Russia and Iran focused on keeping peace in the warring nation to decrease the chances of U.S. or Turkish involvement. Russia backed the pro-government faction and deployed troops from the Commonwealth of Independent States to guard the Tajikistan-Afghan border. All but 25,000 of the more than 400,000 ethnic Russians, who were mostly employed in industry, fled to Russia. By 1997, the war had ended after a peace agreement between the government and the Islamist-led opposition, and a central government began to take form, with peaceful elections in 1999.

"Longtime observers of Tajikistan often characterize the country as profoundly averse to risk and skeptical of promises of reform, a political passivity they trace to the country's ruinous civil war," Ilan Greenberg wrote in a news article in The New York Times before the country's November 2006 presidential election.

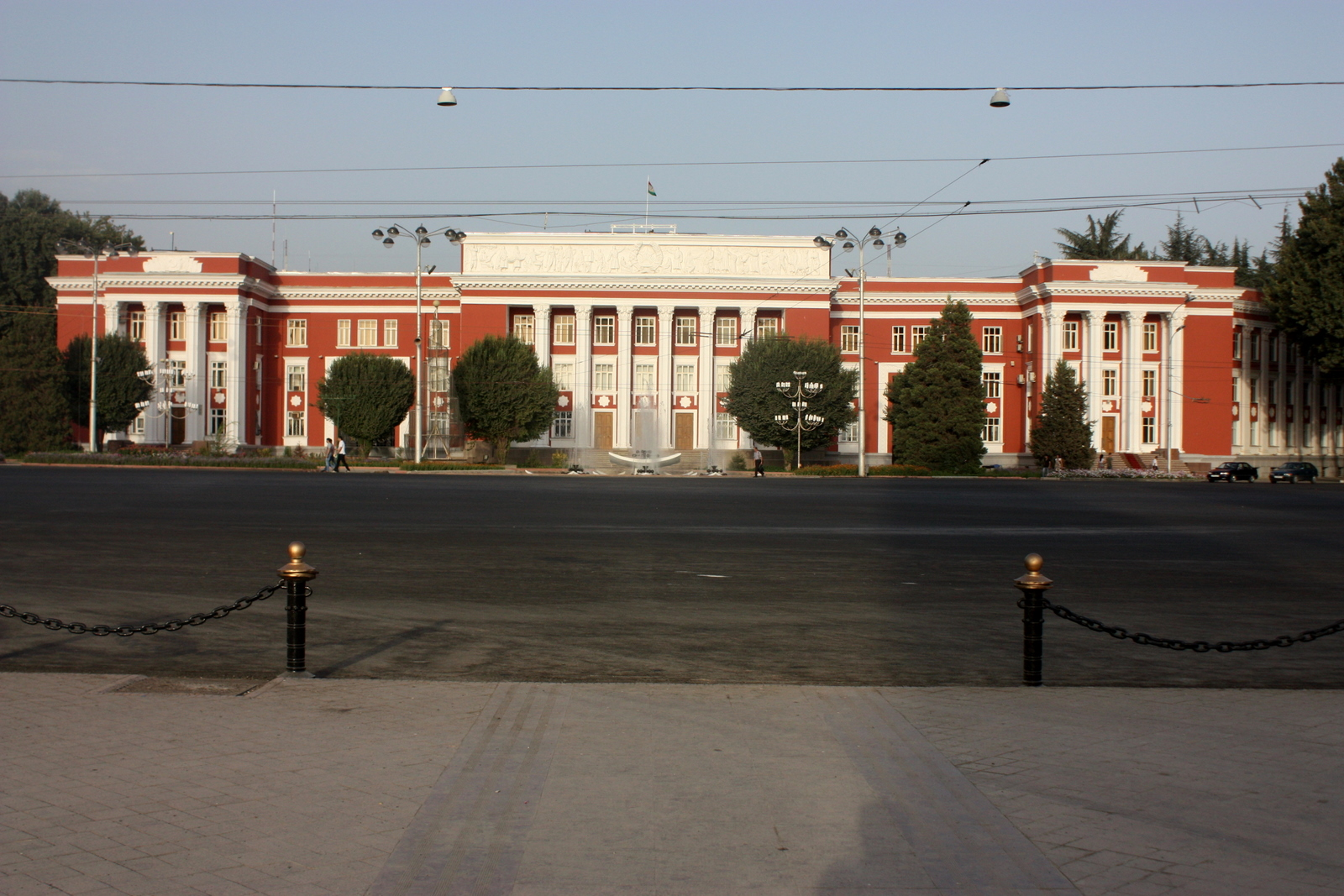
Supreme Assembly in Dushanbe.

The parliamentary elections of 2005 aroused accusations from opposition parties and international observers that President Emomali Rahmon corruptly manipulated the election process and unemployment. Elections in February 2010 saw the ruling PDPT lose four seats in Parliament, yet still maintain a majority. The Organization for Security and Co-operation in Europe election observers said the 2010 polling "failed to meet many key OSCE commitments" and that "these elections failed on many basic democratic standards." The government insisted that only minor violations had occurred, which would not affect the will of the Tajik people.

The Tajik government has reportedly clamped down on facial hair as part of a crackdown on Islamic influence and due to its perceived associations with Islamic extremism, which is evident in bordering Afghanistan.

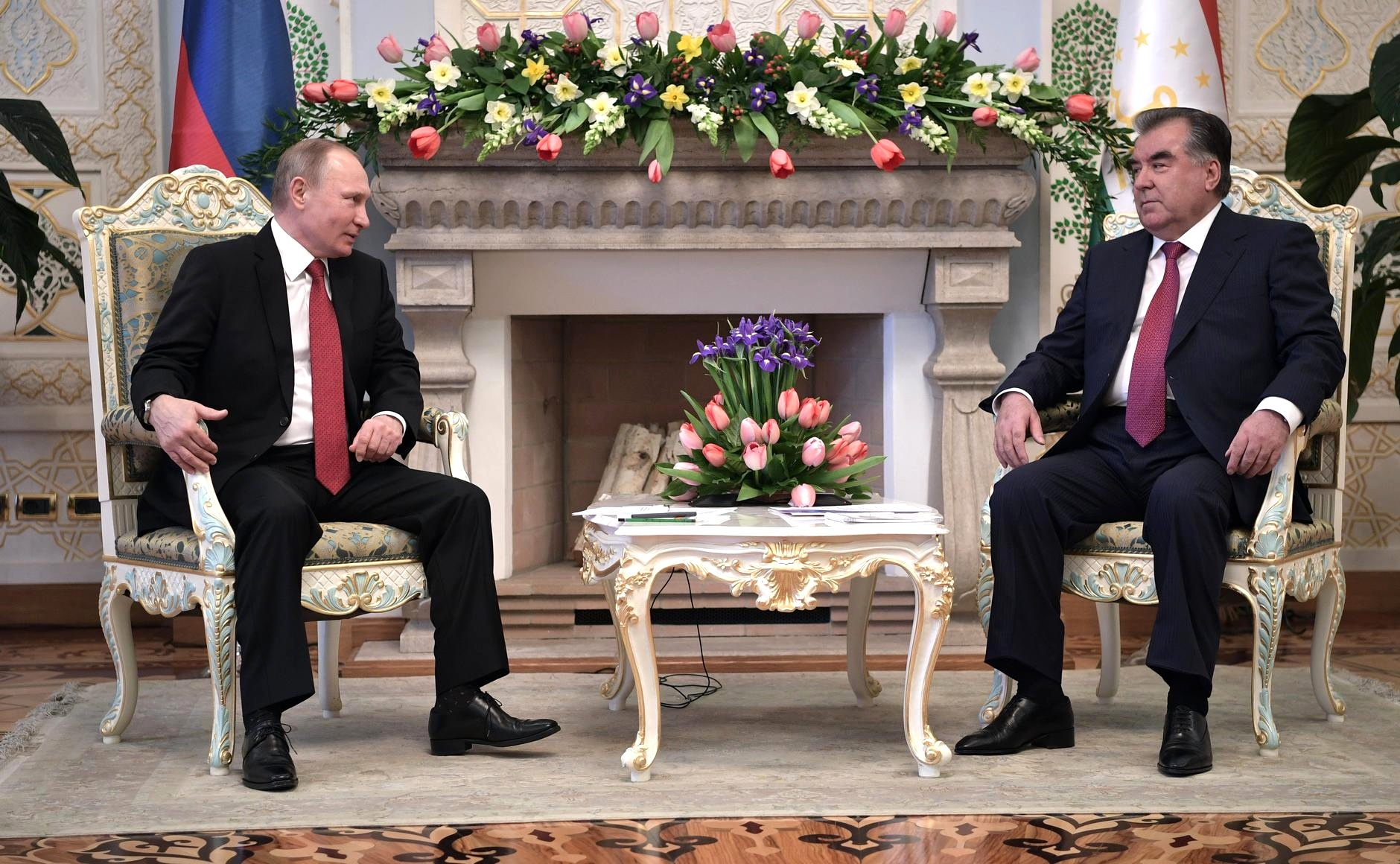
President of Tajikistan Emomali Rahmon with Russian president Vladimir Putin.

The presidential election held on 6 November 2006 was boycotted by "mainline" opposition parties, including the 23,000-member Islamic Renaissance Party. Four remaining opponents "all but endorsed the incumbent", Rahmon.

Freedom of the press is officially guaranteed by the government, and independent press outlets remain restricted, as does an amount of web content. According to the Institute for War & Peace Reporting, access to local and foreign websites is blocked, and journalists are sometimes obstructed from reporting on some events. In practice, no public criticism of the regime is tolerated and all direct protest is suppressed and denied coverage in the local media.

In the 2020 Democracy Index by the Economist Intelligence Unit, Tajikistan was ranked 160th, after Saudi Arabia, while receiving the designation of "authoritarian regime".

In July 2019, UN ambassadors of 37 countries, including Tajikistan, signed a joint letter to UNHRC defending China's treatment of Uyghurs in the Xinjiang region.

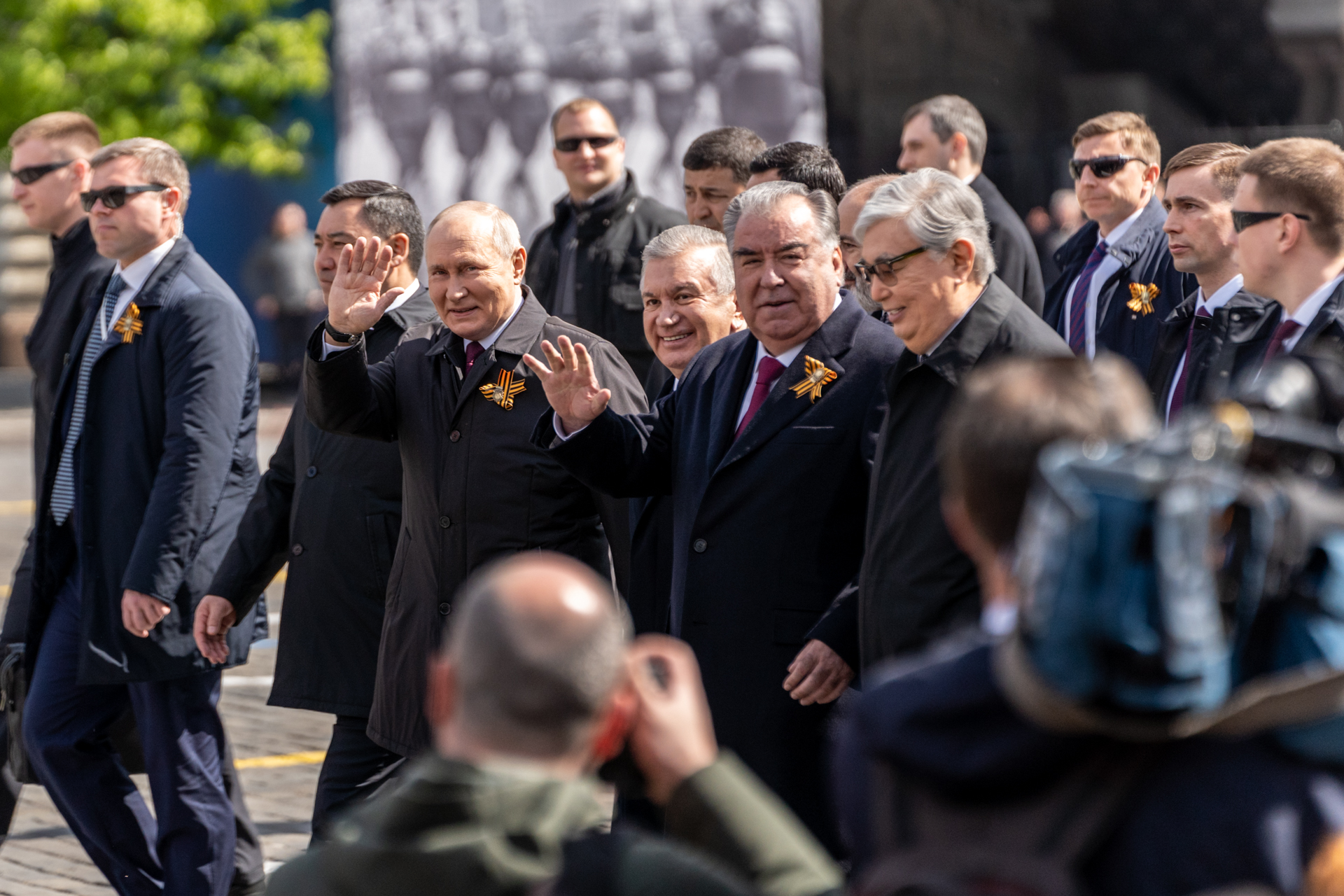
Rahmon, Mirziyoyev, Tokayev and other post-Soviet leaders at the 2023 Moscow Victory Day Parade

In October 2020, President Emomali Rahmon was re-elected for another seven-year term with 90% of the vote, following a largely ceremonial election.

In April 2021, a conflict over water with Kyrgyzstan escalated into one of the border clashes between the two countries since independence.

In July 2021, Tajikistan appealed to members of a Russian-led Collective Security Treaty Organization (CSTO) of ex-Soviet states for help in dealing with security challenges emerging from neighbouring Afghanistan. The safety concerns emerged as foreign troops such as the US and British army exited the country, causing over 1,000 Afghan civilians and servicemen to flee to neighbouring Tajikistan after Taliban insurgents took control of parts of Afghanistan.

== Geography ==
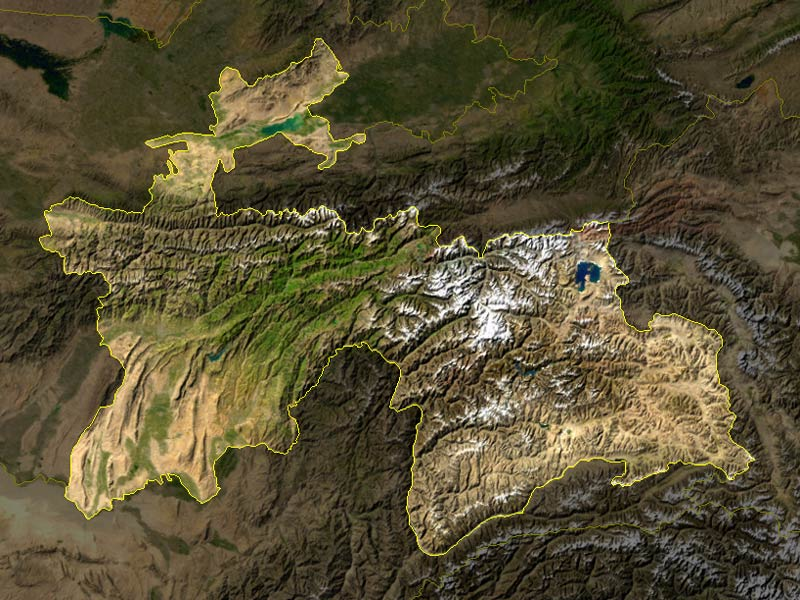
Satellite photograph

Map of Köppen climate classification

Tajikistan is landlocked and is the smallest nation in Central Asia by area. It lies mostly between latitudes 36° and 41° N, and longitudes 67° and 75° E. It is covered by mountains of the Pamir range, and most of the country is over 3,000 metres (9,800 ft) above sea level. The areas of lower land are in the north (part of the Fergana Valley) and in the southern valleys of the Kofarnihon and Vakhsh rivers, which form the Amu Darya. Dushanbe is located on the southern slopes above the Kofarnihon valley.

Mountain	Height		Location
Ismoil Somoni Peak (highest)	7,495 m	24,590 ft	North-western edge of Gorno-Badakhshan (GBAO), south of the Kyrgyz border
Ibn Sina Peak (Lenin Peak)	7,134 m	23,537 ft	Northern border in the Trans-Alay Range, north-east of Ismoil Somoni Peak
Peak Korzhenevskaya	7,105 m	23,310 ft	North of Ismoil Somoni Peak, on the south bank of Muksu River
Independence Peak (Revolution Peak)	6,974 m	22,881 ft	Central Gorno-Badakhshan, south-east of Ismoil Somoni Peak
Academy of Sciences Range	6,785 m	22,260 ft	North-western Gorno-Badakhshan, stretches in the north–south direction
Karl Marx Peak	6,726 m	22,067 ft	GBAO, near the border to Afghanistan in the northern ridge of the Karakoram Range
Garmo Peak	6,595 m	21,637 ft	Northwestern Gorno-Badakhshan.
Mayakovskiy Peak	6,096 m	20,000 ft	Extreme south-west of GBAO, near the border to Afghanistan.
Concord Peak	5,469 m	17,943 ft	Southern border in the northern ridge of the Karakoram Range
Kyzylart Pass	4,280 m	14,042 ft	Northern border in the Trans-Alay Range

The Amu Darya and Panj rivers mark the border with Afghanistan, and the glaciers in Tajikistan's mountains are the source of runoff for the Aral Sea. There are over 900 rivers in Tajikistan longer than 10 kilometres.

=== Administrative divisions ===
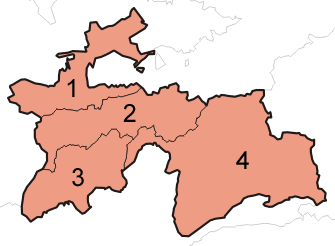
A clickable map of Tajikistan exhibiting its four provinces.

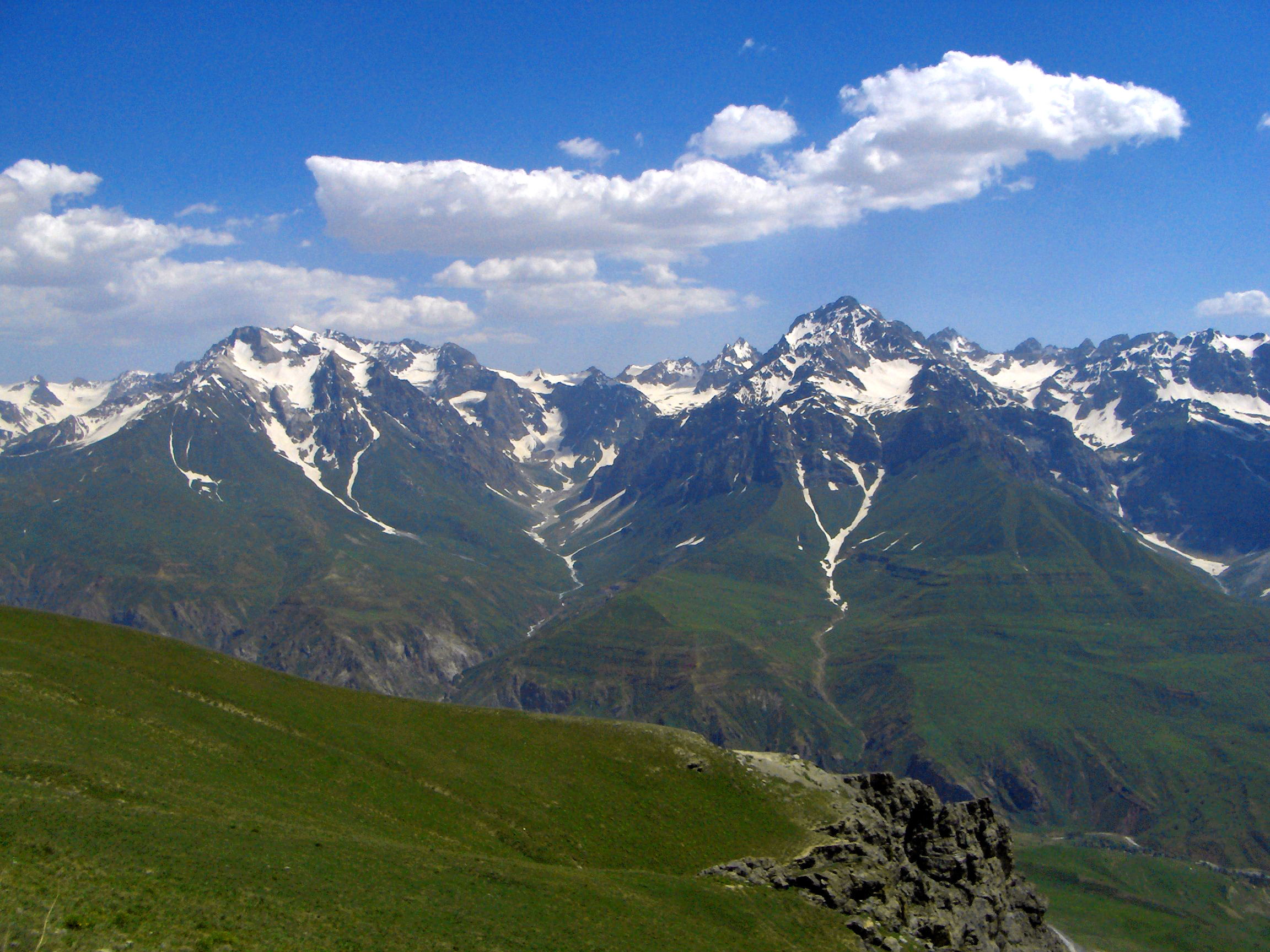
Mountains

Tajikistan consists of four administrative divisions. These are the provinces (viloyat) of Sughd and Khatlon, the autonomous province of Gorno-Badakhshan (abbreviated as GBAO), and the Regions of Republican Subordination (RRP – Raiony Respublikanskogo Podchineniya in transliteration from Russian or NTJ – Ноҳияҳои тобеи ҷумҳурӣ [Nohiyahoi tobei jumhurii] in Tajik). Each region is divided into districts (Tajik: Ноҳия, nohiya or raion), which in turn are subdivided into jamoats (village-level self-governing units) and then villages (qyshloqs). As of 2006, there were 58 districts and 367 jamoats in Tajikistan.

Division	ISO 3166-2	Map No	Capital	Area (km^{2})	Pop. (2019)
Sughd	TJ-SU	1	Khujand	25,400	2,658,400
Region of Republican Subordination	TJ-RR	2	Dushanbe	28,600	2,122,000
Khatlon	TJ-KT	3	Bokhtar	24,800	3,274,900
Gorno-Badakhshan	TJ-GB	4	Khorugh	64,200	226,900
Dushanbe			Dushanbe	124.6	846,400

=== Biodiversity ===
Tajikistan contains five terrestrial ecoregions: Alai-Western Tian Shan steppe, Gissaro-Alai open woodlands, Pamir alpine desert and tundra, Badghyz and Karabil semi-desert, and Paropamisus xeric woodlands.

== Economy ==
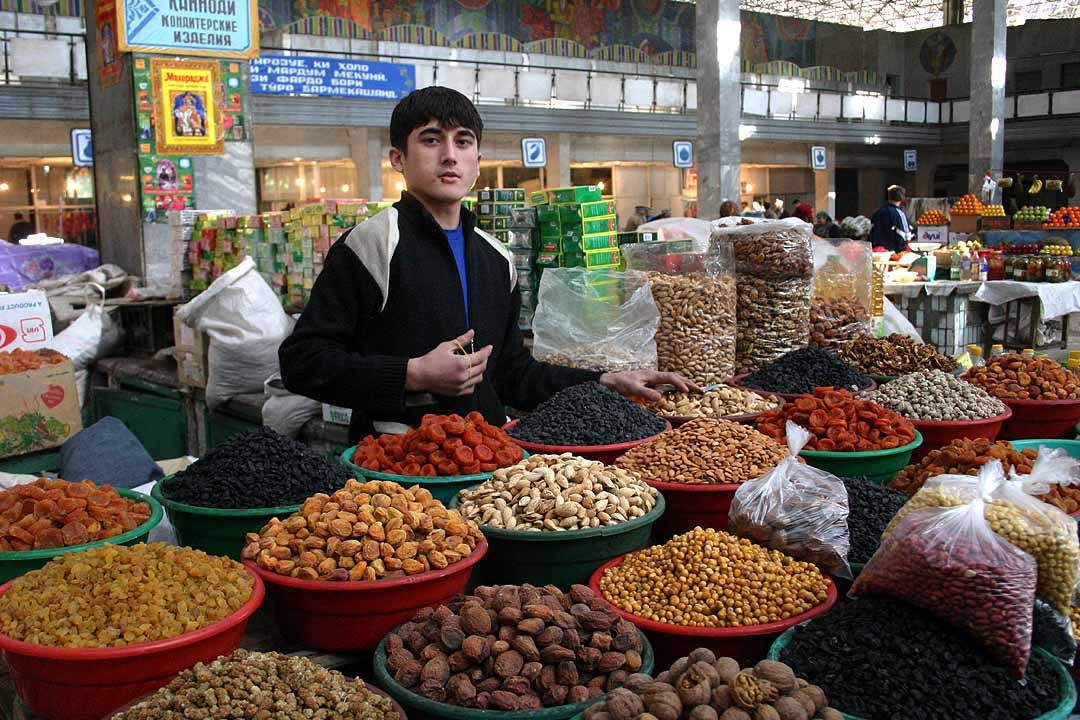
A Tajik dry fruit seller

In 2019, nearly 29% of Tajikistan's GDP came from immigrant remittances (mostly from Tajiks working in Russia). With foreign revenue precariously dependent on remittances from migrant workers overseas and on exports of aluminium and cotton, the economy is vulnerable to external shocks. In fiscal year 2000, international assistance remained an essential source of support for rehabilitation programmes that reintegrated former civil‑war combatants into the civilian economy, which helped to maintain peace. International assistance was also necessary to address the second year of drought, which resulted in a continued shortfall in food production. On 21 August 2001, the Red Cross announced that a famine was striking Tajikistan, and called for international aid for the country. In January 2012, 680,152 people in Tajikistan were living with food insecurity. Of these, 676,852 were at risk of Phase 3 (Acute Food and Livelihoods Crisis) food insecurity, and 3,300 were at risk of Phase 4 (Humanitarian Emergency). Those at the highest risk of food insecurity were living in the Murghob District of GBAO.

The malnutrition rate in Tajikistan will reach 30% in 2023 according to the United Nations World Food Programme (WFP). As in the rest of Central Asia, soils are deteriorating and water resources are diminishing, particularly as a result of climate change.

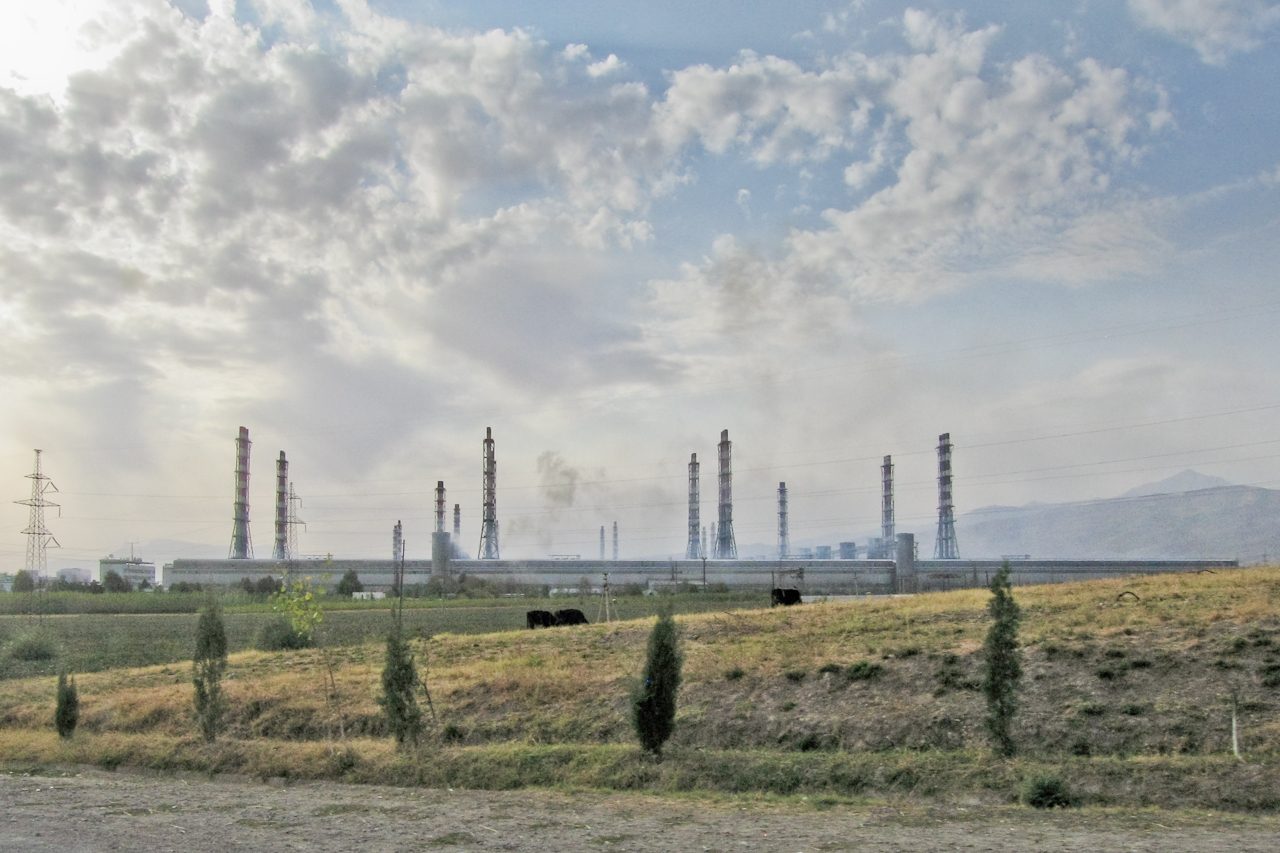
The TadAZ aluminium smelting plant, in Tursunzoda, is the largest aluminium manufacturing plant in Central Asia, and Tajikistan's chief industrial asset.

Tajikistan's economy grew after the war. The GDP of Tajikistan expanded at an average rate of 9.6% over the period of 2000–2007 according to the World Bank data. This "improved" Tajikistan's position among other Central Asian countries (namely Turkmenistan and Uzbekistan), which seem to have degraded economically ever since. The primary sources of income in Tajikistan are aluminium production, cotton growing and remittances from migrant workers. Cotton accounts for 60% of agricultural output, supporting 75% of the rural population, and using 45% of irrigated arable land. The aluminium industry is represented by the state-owned Tajik Aluminum Company – the biggest aluminium plant in Central Asia and one of the biggest in the world.

Tajikistan's rivers, such as the Vakhsh and the Panj, have hydropower potential, and the government has focused on attracting investment for projects for internal use and electricity exports. Tajikistan is home to the Nurek Dam, the second highest dam in the world. Russia's RAO UES has been working on the Sangtuda-1 hydroelectric power station (670 MW capacity) which commenced operations on 18 January 2008. Other projects at the development stage include Sangtuda-2 by Iran, Zerafshan by the Chinese company SinoHydro, and the Rogun power plant that, at a projected height of 335 metres (1,099 ft), would supersede the Nurek Dam as highest in the world if it is brought to completion. A planned project, CASA-1000, will transmit 1000 MW of surplus electricity from Tajikistan to Pakistan with power transit through Afghanistan. The total length of transmission line is 750 km while the project is planned to be on Public-Private Partnership basis with the support of WB, IFC, ADB and IDB. The project cost is estimated to be around US$865 million. Other energy resources include coal deposits and smaller reserves of natural gas and petroleum.

In 2014 Tajikistan was the world's most remittance-dependent economy with remittances accounting for 49% of GDP and expected to fall by 40% in 2015 due to the economic crisis in the Russian Federation. Tajik migrant workers abroad, mainly in the Russian Federation, have become the main source of income for millions of Tajikistan's people and with the 2014–2015 downturn in the Russian economy the World Bank warned that numbers of Tajik men would return home and face "few" economic prospects.

According to some estimates about 47% of the population lives on less than US$1.25 per day. Migration from Tajikistan and the consequent remittances have been unprecedented in their magnitude and economic ramifications. In 2010, remittances from Tajik labour migrants totalled an estimated $2.1 billion US dollars, an increase from 2009. Tajikistan has shifted from a planned economy to a market economy without "substantial and protracted" recourse to aid, exporting cheap labour as its main commodity. The World Bank Tajikistan Policy Note 2006 concludes that remittances have played a role as one of the drivers of Tajikistan's economic growth during the past years, have increased incomes, and as a result helped reduce poverty.

Drug trafficking is an illegal market in Tajikistan, yet due to its positioning it's able to sell Afghan narcotics to Russian, and, to a lesser extent, Western European markets; opium poppy is also cultivated for its domestic market. International organisations such as the UNODC, and US, Russian, EU and Afghan authorities have worked with Tajik officials in order to curb these practices. Tajikistan has the third most heroin and raw opium confiscations in the world (1216.3 kg of heroin and 267.8 kg of raw opium in the first half of 2006). Drug money corrupts the country's government; according to some experts the personalities that fought on both sides of the civil war and have held the positions in the government after the armistice was signed are involved in the drug trade. UNODC is working with Tajikistan to strengthen border crossings, provide training, and set up joint interdiction teams. It helped to establish Tajikistani Drug Control Agency.

Besides Russia, China is one of the economic and trade partners of Dushanbe. Tajikistan belongs to the group of countries associated with Chinese investment within the Belt and Road Initiative.

== Transportation ==
As a landlocked country, Tajikistan has no ports, and the majority of transportation is via road, air, and rail. Over the years, Tajikistan has pursued agreements with Iran and Pakistan to gain port access in those countries via Afghanistan. In 2009, an agreement was made between Tajikistan, Pakistan, and Afghanistan to improve and build a 1,300 km (810 mi) highway and rail system connecting the three countries to Pakistan's ports. The proposed route would go through the Gorno-Badakhshan Autonomous Province in the eastern part of the country. In 2012, the presidents of Tajikistan, Afghanistan, and Iran signed an agreement to construct roads and railways, as well as oil, gas, and water pipelines to connect the three countries.

=== Rail ===
The railroad system totals only 680 kilometres (420 mi) of track, all of it 1,520 mm (4 ft 11 27/32 in) broad gauge. The principal segments are in the southern region and connect the capital with the industrial areas of the Hisor and Vakhsh valleys, and with Uzbekistan, Turkmenistan, Kazakhstan, and Russia. Most international freight traffic is carried by train. The Bokhtar–Kulob railway connects the Kulob District with the central area of the country.

=== Air ===
In 2009, Tajikistan had 26 airports, 18 of which had paved runways, of which two had runways longer than 3,000 metres.

=== Roads ===
The total length of roads in the country is 27,800 kilometres. Automobiles account for more than 90% of the total volume of passenger transportation and more than 80% of domestic freight transportation.

In 2004, the Tajik–Afghan Friendship Bridge between Afghanistan and Tajikistan was built, improving the country's access to South Asia. The bridge was built by the United States.

As of 2014, highway and tunnel construction projects are either under way or have been completed. Projects include the rehabilitation of the Dushanbe–Chanak (Uzbek border), Dushanbe–Kulma (Chinese border), and Kurgan‑Tube–Nizhny Pyanj (Afghan border) highways, and the construction of tunnels under the mountain passes of Anzob, Shakhristan, Shar‑Shar, and Chormaghzak. These projects have been supported by international donor countries.

== Demographics ==
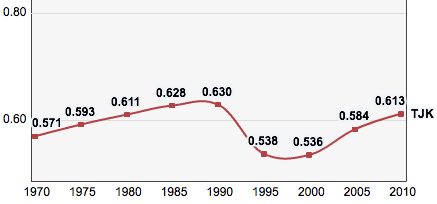
Tajikistan: trends in its Human Development Index indicator 1970–2010

Population in Tajikistan
Year	Million
1926	0.83
1950	1.5
2000	6.2
2021	9.8

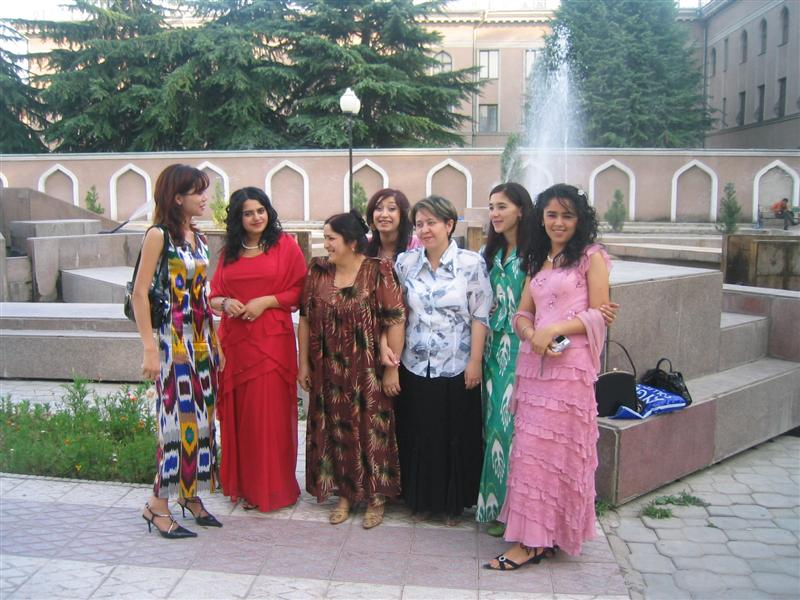
Group of Tajik women

In 2023, Tajikistan was estimated to have a population of 10,389,799, according to World Bank data. The Tajiks, who speak Tajik, are the main ethnic group, while there are minorities of Uzbeks and Russians, whose numbers are declining owing to emigration. This makes Tajikistan the only country in Central Asia to have a minority of Turkic people and a majority of Iranic people. The Pamiris of Badakhshan, the Yaghnobi people, and a minority of Ismailis are considered to belong to the larger group of Tajiks. Citizens of Tajikistan are called Tajikistanis.

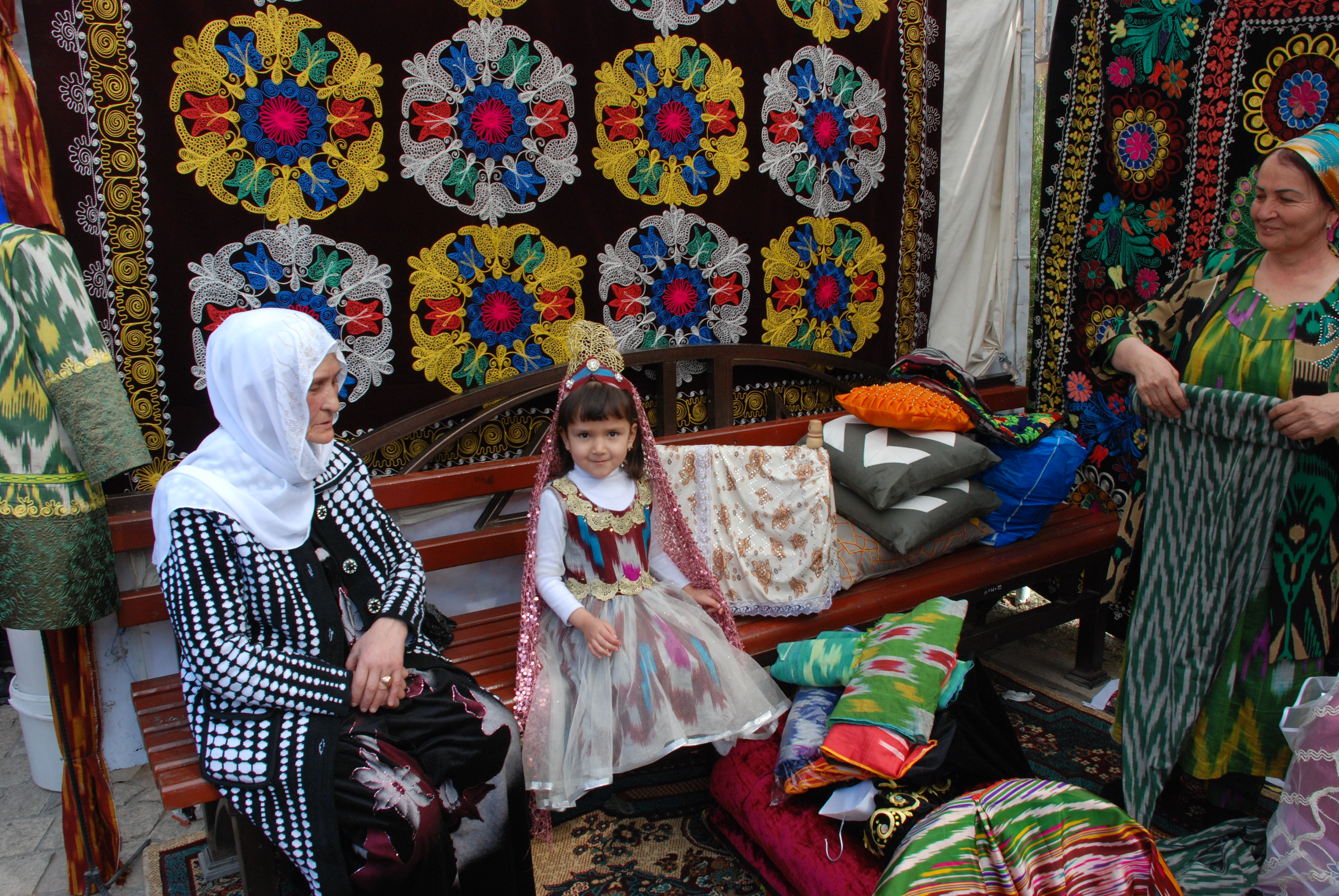
Nowruz celebrations

In 1989, ethnic Russians in Tajikistan made up 7.6% of the population; by 1998, the proportion had fallen to approximately 0.5% following the Tajikistani Civil War, which had displaced the majority of ethnic Russians. After the end of the war, Russian emigration continued. The ethnic German population of Tajikistan has also declined owing to emigration: having peaked at 38,853 in 1979, it has "almost vanished" since the collapse of the Soviet Union.

The Tajiks are the principal ethnic group in most of Tajikistan and in northern and western Afghanistan; there are more Tajiks in Afghanistan than in Tajikistan. Tajiks are a minority in Uzbekistan. Approximately 2.4 million Tajik citizens were officially registered in Russia in 2021.

=== Languages ===
The official languages of Tajikistan are Tajik as the state language and Russian as the interethnic language, as understood in Article 2 of the Constitution: "The state language of Tajikistan shall be Tajik. Russian shall be the language of international communication."

The state (national) language (Tajik: забони давлатӣ, romanised: zaboni davlatí, Russian: государственный язык, romanised: gosudarstvennyy yazyk) of the Republic of Tajikistan is Tajik, which is written in the Tajik Cyrillic alphabet. Millions of native Tajik speakers live in neighbouring Uzbekistan and in Russia.

According to article 2 of the Constitution of the Republic of Tajikistan, Russian is recognised as the second official language of Tajikistan; the official language of inter-ethnic communication (Russian: язык межнационального общения; Tajik: забони муоширати байни миллатҳо) in the country.

Approximately 90% of the population of Tajikistan speaks Russian at varying levels. The varieties of Russian spoken in Tajikistan are referred to by scholars as Tajik(istani) Russian and it shares some similarities with Uzbek(istani) Russian, such as morphological differences and lexical differences such as the use of word урюк for a wild apricot or кислушка for rhubarb.

Both Russian and Tajik speakers in the country use the following words in common in addressing unfamiliar people and acquaintances.

Words of familial relation
Tajikistani Russian	Standard Russian	English translation
апа	старшая сестра	older sister
ака	старший брат	older brother
хола	тетя	aunt
янга	жена брата, невестка	daughter-in-law; sister-in-law

The "highly educated" part of the population of Tajikistan, and the intelligentsia, prefer to speak Russian and Persian, the pronunciation of which in Tajikistan is called the "Iranian style".

Native Uzbek speakers live in the north and west of Tajikistan. In fourth place (after Tajik, Russian and Uzbek) by number of native speakers are Pamir languages, whose native speakers live in Kuhistani Badakshshan Autonomous Region. The majority of Zoroastrians in Tajikistan speak one of the Pamir languages. Native speakers of the Kyrgyz language live in the north of Kuhistani Badakshshan Autonomous Region. Yagnobi language speakers live in the west of the country. The Parya language of local Romani people (Central Asian Gypsies) is spoken in Tajikistan. Tajikistan has communities of native speakers of Persian, Arabic, Pashto, Armenian, Azerbaijani, Tatar, Turkmen, Kazakh, Chinese, and Ukrainian.

=== Employment ===
In 2009 nearly 1 million Tajiks worked abroad (mainly in Russia). More than 70% of the female population lives in traditional villages.

=== Religion ===
Religion in Tajikistan, 2020
Religion	Percent
Islam	97.5%
Christianity	0.7%
Unaffiliated	1.7%
others	0.2%

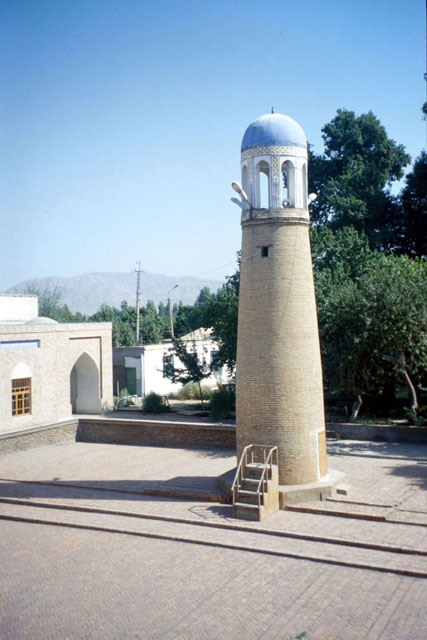
A mosque in Isfara

Tajikistan is a secular state with a constitution providing for freedom of religion, but nevertheless it heavily regulates the practices of its Muslim majority. Sunni Islam of the Hanafi school has been officially recognised by the government since 2009. The government has declared two Islamic holidays, Eid ul-Fitr and Eid al-Adha, as state holidays. According to a US State Department release and Pew research group, the population of Tajikistan is 98% Muslim. Approximately 87–95% of them are Sunni and roughly 3% are Shia and roughly 7% are non-denominational Muslims. The Shia part of the population predominantly live in the Gorno-Badakhshan Autonomous Region and are followers of the Ismaili branch of Shia Islam. The remaining 2% of the population are followers of Russian Orthodoxy, Protestantism, Zoroastrianism and Buddhism. Muslims fast during Ramadan, while about one third in the countryside and 10% in the cities observe daily prayer and dietary restrictions.

As of January 2016, as part of an "anti-radicalisation campaign", police in the Khatlon region reportedly shaved the beards of 13,000 men and shut down 160 shops selling the hijab. Shaving beards and discouraging women from wearing hijabs is part of a government campaign targeting trends that are deemed "alien and inconsistent with Tajik culture", and "to preserve secular traditions".

There is a concern for religious institutions becoming active in the political sphere. The Islamic Renaissance Party (IRP), a combatant in the 1992–1997 Civil War and then-proponent of the creation of an Islamic state in Tajikistan, constitutes no more than 30% of the government by statute. Membership in Hizb ut-Tahrir, a militant Islamic party which aims for an overthrow of secular governments and the unification of Tajiks under one Islamic state, is illegal and members are subject to arrest and imprisonment.

By law, religious communities must register with the State Committee on Religious Affairs (SCRA) and with local authorities. Registration with the SCRA requires a charter, a list of ten or more members, and evidence of local government approval for the prayer site location. Religious groups that do not have a physical structure are not allowed to gather publicly for prayer. Failure to register can result in fines and closure of a place of worship. There are reports that registration at the local level is sometimes difficult to obtain. People under the age of 18 are barred from public religious practice.

Approximately 1.6% of the population in Tajikistan is Christian, mostly Orthodox Christians. The territory of Tajikistan is part of the Dushanbe and Tajikistan Diocese of the Central Asian Metropolitan District of the Russian Orthodox Moscow Patriarchate. The country is home to communities of Catholics, Armenian Christians, Protestants, Lutherans, Jehovah's Witnesses, Baptists, Mormons, and Adventists.

Bukharan Jews have lived in Tajikistan since the 2nd century BC. In the 1940s, the Jewish community of Tajikistan numbered nearly 30,000 people. Most were Persian‑speaking Bukharan Jews who had lived in the region for millennia, along with Ashkenazi Jews from Eastern Europe who resettled there in the Soviet era. As of 2011, the Jewish population was estimated at fewer than 500, with roughly half living in Dushanbe.

=== Health ===
A hospital in Dushanbe

The state's Ministry of Labour and Social Welfare reported that 104,272 disabled people were registered in Tajikistan in 2000. The government of Tajikistan and the World Bank considered activities to support this part of the population, as described in the World Bank's Poverty Reduction Strategy Paper. Public expenditure on health was 1% of GDP in 2004.

Life expectancy at birth was estimated at 69 years in 2020. The infant mortality rate was approximately 30.42 deaths per 1,000 live births in 2018. In 2014, there were 2.1 physicians per 1,000 people, higher than in any other low‑income country except North Korea.

Tajikistan has experienced a decrease in hospital beds per capita since 1992, following the dissolution of the USSR, although the number remains at 4.8 beds per 1,000 people, above the world average of 2.7.

According to the World Bank, 96% of births are attended by skilled health staff, up from 66.6% in 1999.

In 2010, the country experienced an outbreak of polio that caused more than 457 cases in both children and adults and resulted in 29 deaths, before being brought under control.

In the summer of 2021, the coronavirus ravaged the country, and the Tajik president's sister reportedly died of COVID-19 in a hospital. According to local media, the president's sister's sons physically assaulted the health minister and a senior doctor.

In 2023, according to the World Health Organization, Tajikistan received certification declaring it a malaria‑free country.

=== Education ===
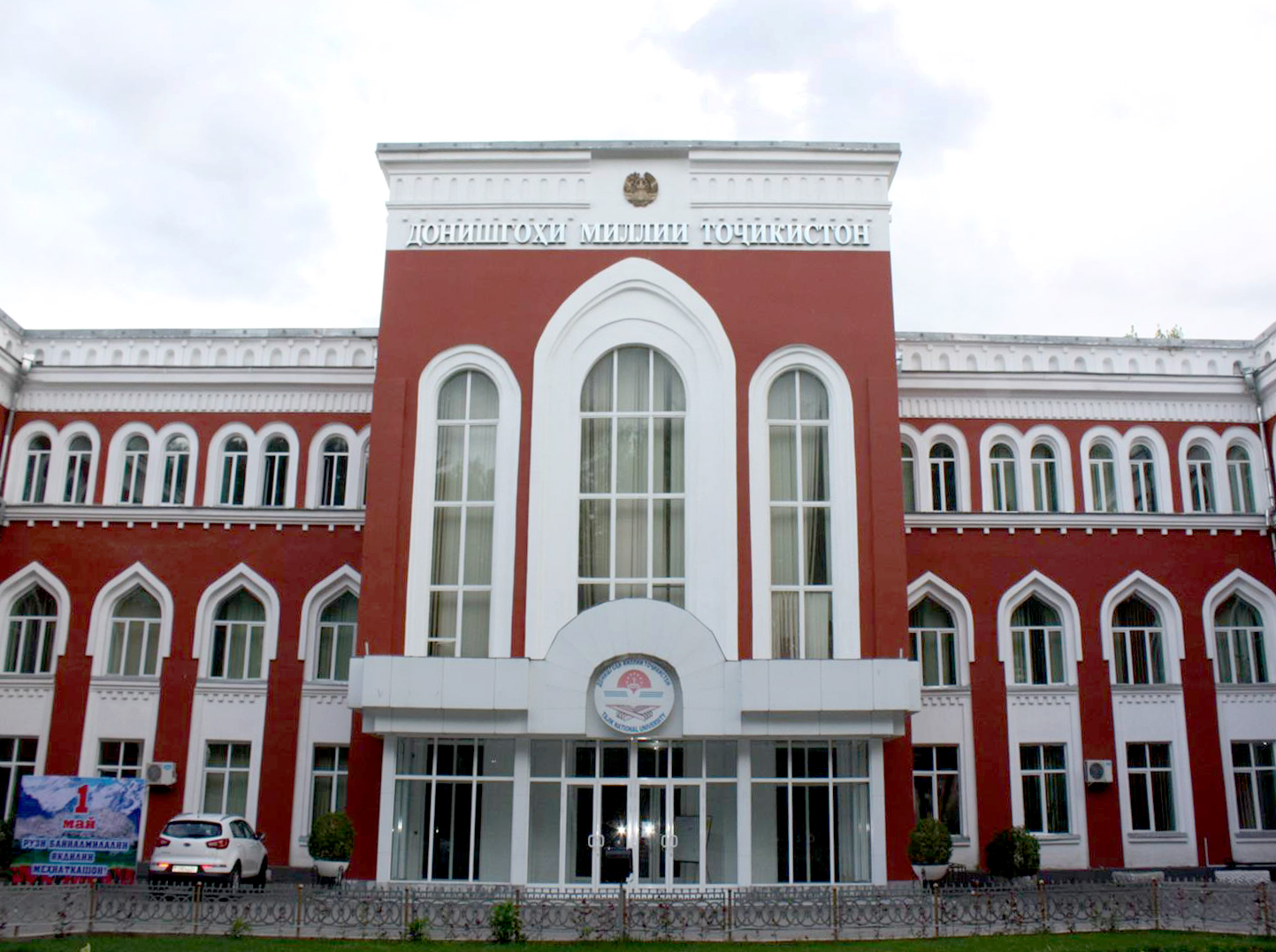
Tajik National University in Dushanbe

An estimated 99.8% of the population of Tajikistan have the ability to read and write.

Public education in Tajikistan consists of 11 years of primary and secondary education, with the government planned to implement a 12-year system in 2016. There are a number of tertiary education institutions, including Khujand State University, which has 76 departments in 15 faculties, Tajikistan State University of Law, Business, & Politics, Khorugh State University, Agricultural University of Tajikistan, Tajik National University, and other institutions. Universities were established during the Soviet Era. As of 2008, tertiary education enrollment was 17%, below the sub-regional average of 37%, while higher than any other low-income country after Syria. Tajiks left the education system due to "low" demand in the labour market for people with "extensive" educational training or professional skills.

Public spending on education was relatively constant between 2005–2012 and fluctuated from 3.5% to 4.1% of GDP below the OECD average of 6%. The United Nations reported that the level of spending was "severely inadequate to meet the requirements of the country's high-needs education system."

According to a UNICEF-supported survey, about 25% of girls in Tajikistan fail to complete compulsory primary education because of poverty and gender bias, while literacy is "generally high" in Tajikistan. Estimates of out of school children range from 4.6% to 19.4% with the majority being girls.

In September 2017, the University of Central Asia launched its second campus in Khorog, Tajikistan, offering majors in Earth & Environmental Sciences and Economics. Tajikistan was ranked 108th in the Global Innovation Index in 2025.

Science in the territory of Tajikistan achieved "success" in the Middle Ages, and the Soviet period inspired the creation of scientific organisations. During the period of independence, the scientific sphere has experienced a "crisis": the annual number of patent applications for inventions decreased in 1994–2011 from 193 to 5. A contribution to science is made by universities, where in 2011 6707 researchers worked, of which 2450 had academic degrees.

== Culture ==
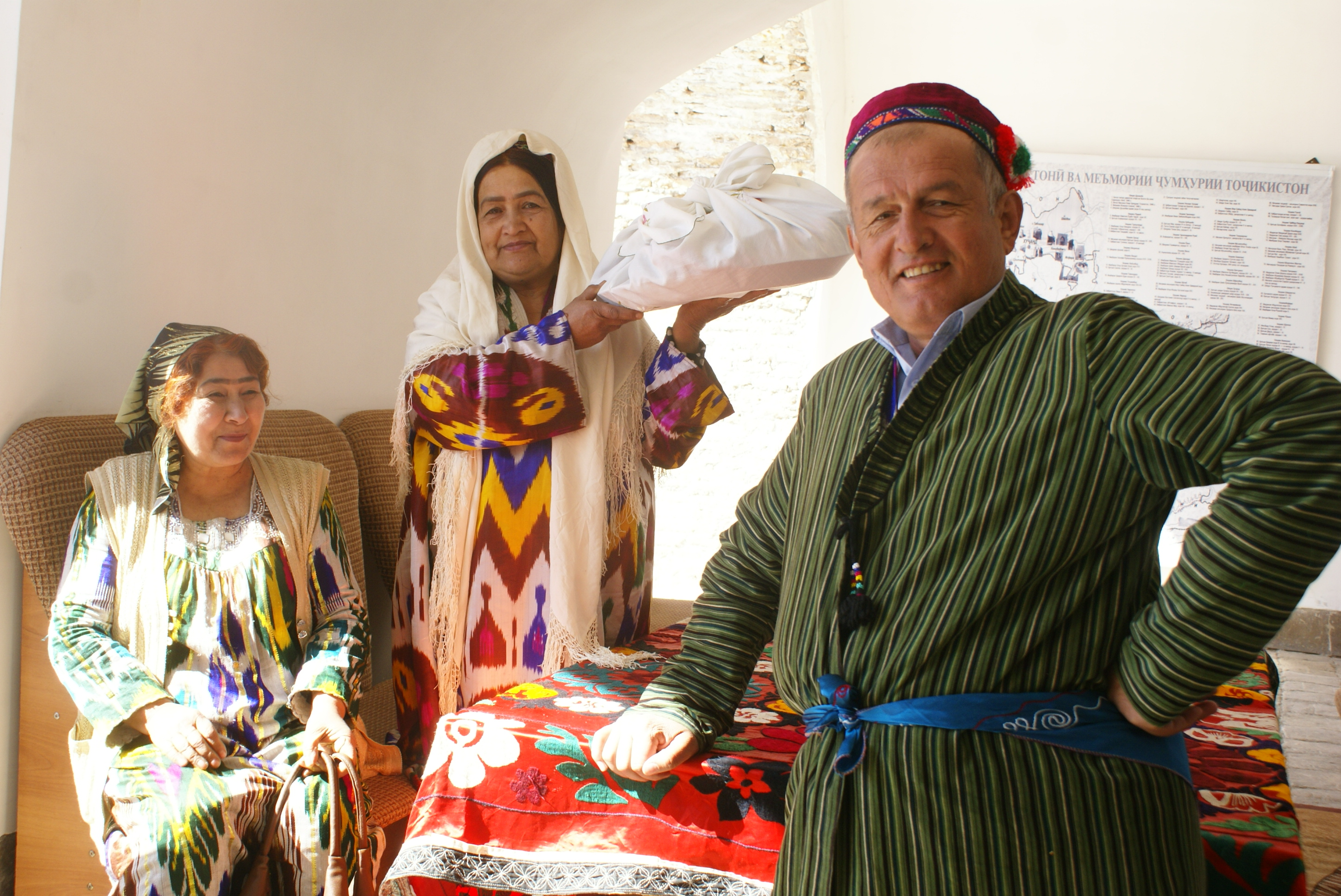
Tajik traditional dress

The Tajik language is the mother tongue of around 80% of the citizens of Tajikistan. Urban centres in Tajikistan include Dushanbe (the capital), Khujand, Kulob, Panjakent, Bokhtar, Khorugh and Istaravshan. There are Uzbek, Kyrgyz and Russian minorities.

The Yaghnobi people live in areas of northern Tajikistan, the estimated number being about 25,000. Forced migrations in the 20th century decimated their numbers. They speak the Yaghnobi language, which is the only direct descendant of the Sogdian language.

Tajikistan artisans created the Dushanbe Tea House, which was presented in 1988 as a gift to the sister city of Boulder, Colorado.

In the country, especially among women from the indigenous population, the wearing of traditional national clothing is preserved. The seamstresses and embroiderers of regions of Tajikistan use factory fabrics and local needlework embroidery for home decoration and women's clothing. The practice of Chakan embroidery is preserved among women in certain areas, passing the knowledge down from one generation to the next.

=== Sport ===
The national sport of Tajikistan is gushtigiri, a form of wrestling.

Another sport is buzkashi, a game played on horseback, like polo. Buzkashi may be played as an individual sport and as a team sport. The aim of the game is to grab a 50 kg dead goat, ride clear of the other players, get back to the starting point and drop it in a designated circle. It is played at Nowruz celebrations.

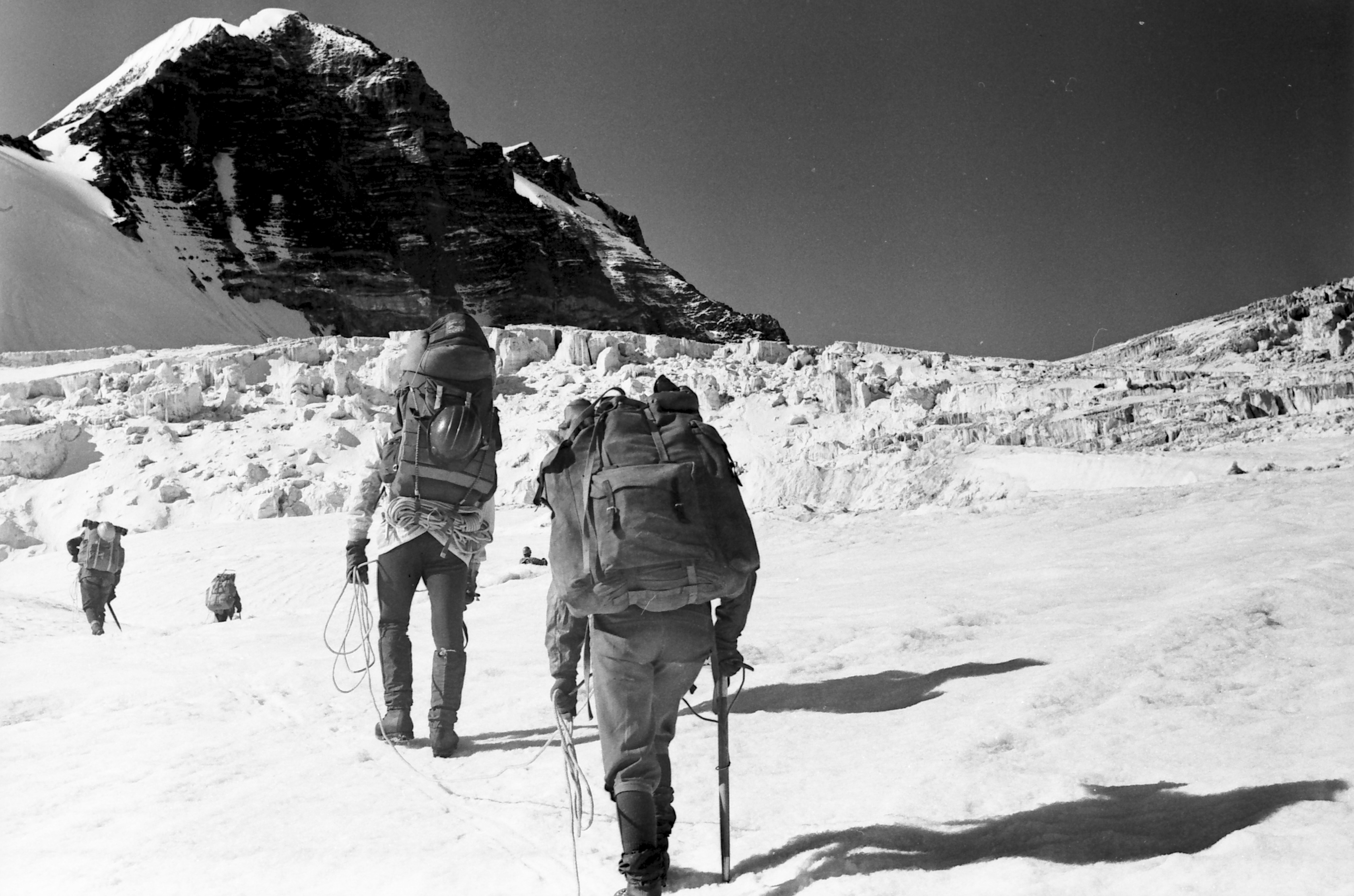
Tajikistan is a destination amongst mountaineers. 1982 expedition to Tartu Ülikool 350.

Tajikistan has sent athletes to every Summer Olympic Games and four Winter Olympic Games since gaining independence and has enjoyed limited success. (Note: Tajikistani athletes competed as part of the Unified Team in 1992.) The country's best results have come in the hammer throw, with Andrey Abduvaliyev and Dilshod Nazarov each winning gold in the men's event in 1992 and 2016 respectively (albeit with Abduvaliyev participating as part of the Unified Team). Tajikistan's highest medal haul at an Olympic Games came in the 2024 Summer Olympics, where its athletes won three medals.

The Tajikistan Football Federation is the governing body of football in Tajikistan. While neither the men's nor the women's teams have qualified for a World Cup, the men's side qualified for the 2023 AFC Asian Cup, in which they unexpectedly reached the quarter finals. The men's team participated in the AFC Challenge Cup on four occasions, winning the inaugural edition in 2006. The women's side has twice participated in the CAFA Women's Championship, finishing third in the 2018 edition and hosting the tournament in 2022.

The Tajikistan Cricket Federation was formed in 2012 as the governing body for the sport of cricket in Tajikistan, and it was granted affiliate membership of the Asian Cricket Council in the same year.

In 2012, the Tajik rugby union was officially registered with the Ministry of Justice, having three men's clubs.

Khorugh, capital of Gorno-Badakhshan Autonomous Region, is the location of highest altitude where bandy has been played.

Tajikistan has one ski resort, called Safed Dara (formerly Takob), near the town of Varzob.

== See also ==
- 2006 Tajikistan earthquake
- Central Asian Union
- Ittihodi Scouthoi Tojikiston
- List of cities in Tajikistan
- LGBT rights in Tajikistan
- Mount Imeon
- Outline of Tajikistan
- Mass media in Tajikistan
- Yaghnob Valley

== Sources ==
- Allworth, Edward A. (2003). The Personal History of a Bukharan Intellectual: The Diary of Muḥammad Sharīf-i Ṣadr-i Ziyā. Brill Publishers. ISBN 978-9004131613.
- Arjomand, Saïd Amir (2025). Persianate Historical Sociology: Collected Essays. Brill. ISBN 978-9004742529.
- Atkin, Muriel (2019). "Modern Tajikistan". Oxford Research Encyclopedia of Asian History. doi:10.1093/acrefore/9780190277727.013.246. ISBN 978-0-19-027772-7.
- Battis, Matthias (2015). "Soviet Orientalism and Nationalism in Central Asia: Aleksandr Semenov's Vision of Tajik National Identity". Region. 48 (5): 729–745. doi:10.1080/00210862.2015.1058632. (registration required)
- Clark, James D. (2019). "New Nation, New History: Promoting National History in Tajikistan". Iran and the Caucasus. 11 (2). Brill: 224–239. doi:10.1163/18747167-12341322.
- Foltz, Richard (2019). A History of the Tajiks: Iranians of the East. New York: Bloomsbury Publishing. ISBN 978-1784539559.
- Heathershaw, John; Herzig, Edmund (2013). "From Resettlement to Conflict: Development-Induced Involuntary Displacement and Violence in Tajikistan". In Heathershaw, John; Herzig, Edmund (eds.). The Transformation of Tajikistan: The Sources of Statehood. New York, NY: Routledge. p. 1991. ISBN 978-1138209749.
- Kılavuz, Idil Tunçer (2014). Power, Networks and Violent Conflict in Central Asia: A Comparison of Tajikistan and Uzbekistan (1st ed.). Taylor & Francis. ISBN 978-0815377931.
- Perry, John (2009). "Tajik i. The Ethnonym: Origins and Application". In Yarshater, Ehsan (ed.). Encyclopædia Iranica (Online ed.). Encyclopædia Iranica Foundation. ISBN 978-0710090959.
- Rakowska-Harmstone, Teresa (1970). Russia and Nationalism in Central Asia: The Case of Tadzhikistan. Johns Hopkins University Press. ISBN 978-0801810213.
- Roy, Olivier (2000). The New Central Asia: Geopolitics and the Birth of Nations. New York University Press. ISBN 978-0814775554.
