= Economy of Tajikistan =

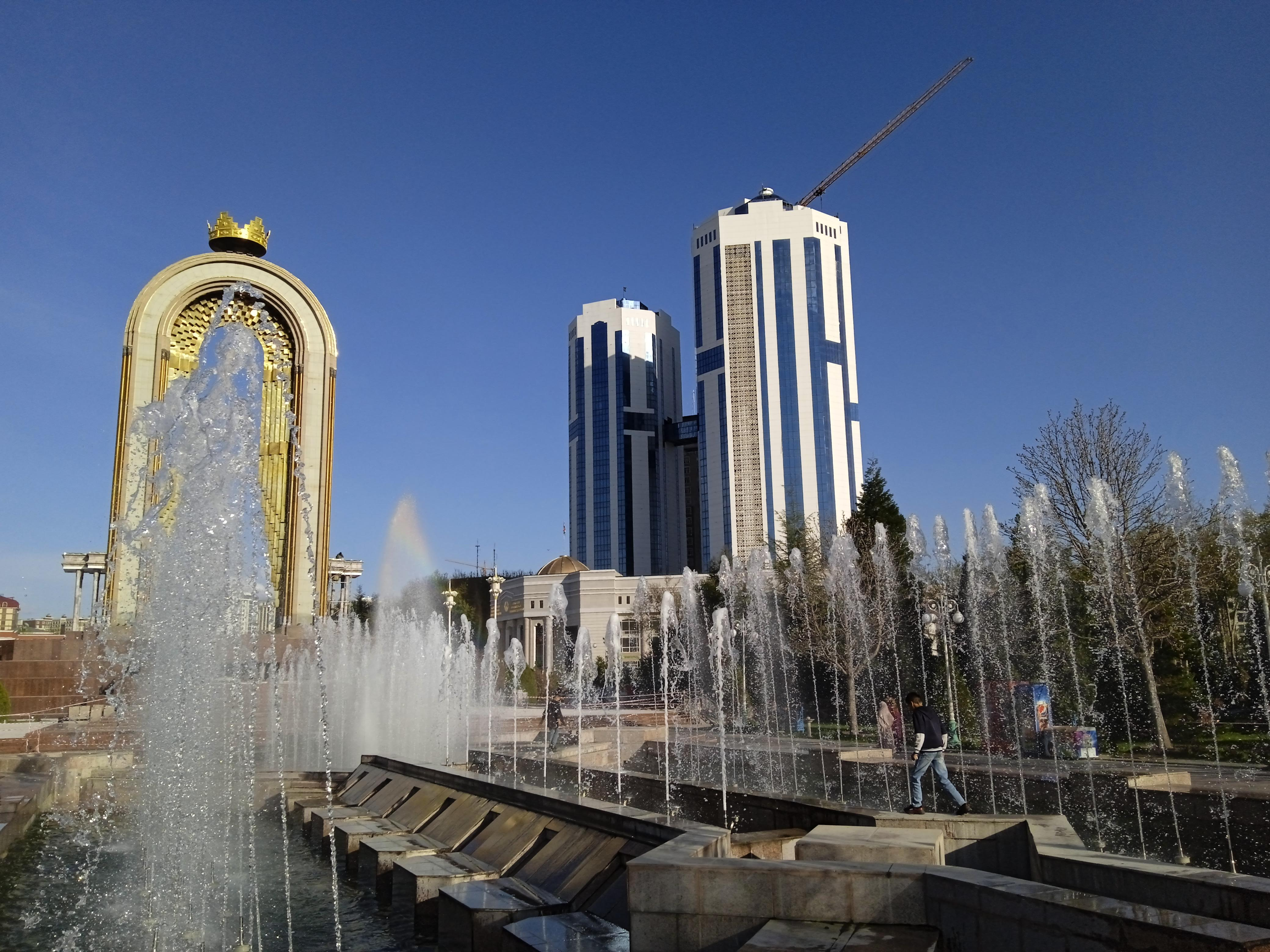
- Dushanbe, the capital of Tajikistan
- Currency: Somoni (ISO code: TJS abbreviation: SM)
- Fiscal year: calendar year
- Trade organisations: IMF, World Bank, CIS, SCO, WTO, CISFTA
- Country group: Developing/Emerging; Lower-middle income economy

Statistics
- GDP: ▲$21.114 billion (nominal, 2026); ▲$70.835 billion (PPP, 2026)
- GDP rank: 133rd (nominal, 2026); 121th (PPP, 2026)
- GDP growth: ▲8.4% (2025); ▲6.0% (2026); ▲4.8% (2027f)
- GDP per capita: ▲$2,005 (nominal, 2026); ▲$6,727 (PPP, 2026)
- GDP per capita rank: 157st (nominal, 2026); 148th (PPP, 2026)
- GDP by sector: agriculture: 23.3%, industry: 22.8%, services: 53.9% (2012 est.)
- Inflation (CPI): ▲4.0% (2026 est.)
- Population below national poverty line: ▼27.4% (2018); ▲2.7% on less than $1.90/day (2020f)
- Gini coefficient: 34.0 medium (2015)
- Human Development Index: ▲0.691 medium (2023) (128th); 0.594 medium IHDI (2023)
- Labour force: labor: ▲2.5 million (2023)
- Labour force by occupation: agriculture: 47.9%, industry: 10.9%, services: 41.2% (2012 est.)
- Unemployment: unemployment: ▼2.0% (2025)
- Informal employment: 63.6% (2016)
- Main industries: aluminium, cement, vegetable oil

External
- Exports: ▲$1.69 billion (2024)
- Export goods: aluminium, electricity, cotton, fruits, vegetable oil, textiles
- Main export partners: China 20.3%; Switzerland 20.3%; EU 19.38%; France 6.70%; Belgium 6.53%; Italy 3.75%; EEU 12.99%; Kazakhstan 12.9%; Turkey 14.6%; Uzbekistan 8.61%; Taiwan 1.71% (2024)
- Imports: ▼$6.29 billion (2024)
- Import goods: petroleum products, aluminium oxide, machinery and equipment, foodstuffs
- Main import partners: China 55.8%; EEU 15.91%; Kazakhstan 15.8%; Uzbekistan 6.06%; Turkey 5.93%; Switzerland 5.81%; EU 4.59%; Italy 0.86%; South Korea 3.00% (2024)

Public finance
- Government debt: ▼US$3.2 billion (2024)
- Revenue: US$2.046 billion (2012 est.)
- Spending: US$2.066 billion (2012)
- Economic aid: recipient: US$67 million from US (2005)
- All values, unless otherwise stated, are in US dollars.

Tajikistan has a developing economy. The economy is heavily dependent on remittance from Tajik labor migrants in Russia, making up nearly half of Tajikistan's GDP. Since independence, it has gradually followed the path of transition economy, reforming its economic policies. With foreign revenue precariously dependent upon exports of cotton and aluminium, the economy is highly vulnerable to external shocks. Tajikistan's economy also incorporates a massive black market, primarily focused on the drug trade with Afghanistan. Heroin trafficking in Tajikistan is estimated to be equivalent to 30-50% of national GDP as of 2012.

In the fiscal year (FY) 2000, international assistance remained an essential source of support for rehabilitation programs that reintegrated former combatants of the Tajikistani Civil War into the civilian economy, thus helping maintain the peace. International assistance also was necessary to address the second year of severe drought that resulted in a continued shortfall of food production. Tajikistan's economy grew substantially after the war. The gross domestic product (GDP) of Tajikistan expanded at an average rate of 9.6% over the period of 2000-2007 according to the World Bank data. This improved Tajikistan's position among other Central Asian countries (namely Turkmenistan and Uzbekistan), which have degraded economically ever since. As of August 2009, an estimated 60% of Tajikistani citizens live below the poverty line. The 2008 financial crisis hit Tajikistan hard, both domestically and internationally. Tajikistan has been hit harder than many countries because it already has a high poverty rate and because many of its citizens depend on remittances from expatriate Tajikistanis.

== Economic history ==
This is a chart of trend of gross domestic product of Tajikistan at market prices estimated by the International Monetary Fund with figures in millions of ruling currency.

Year	Gross Domestic Product	US Dollar Exchange
1995	65,000	123.33 Tajik roubles
2000	1,807	1.82 somoni
2005	7,201	3.11 somoni

For purchasing power parity comparisons, the US Dollar is exchanged at SM 0.82 only.

The Tajikistani economy has been gravely weakened by six years of civil conflict and loss of markets for its products. Tajikistan thus depends on international humanitarian assistance for much of its basic subsistence needs. Even if the peace agreement of June 1997 is honoured, the country faces major problems in integrating refugees and former combatants into the economy. The future of Tajikistan's economy and the potential for attracting foreign investment depend upon stability and continued progress in the peace process.

In 2006 GDP per capita of Tajikistan was 85% of 1990s level. While population has increased from 5.3 million in 1991 to 7.3 million in 2009.

Despite resistance from vested interests, the Government of Tajikistan continued to pursue macroeconomic stabilization and structural reform in FY 2000. In December 1999, the government announced that small-enterprise privatization had been successfully completed, and the privatization of medium-sized and large-owned enterprises (SOEs) continued incrementally. The continued privatization of medium-sized and large SOEs, land reform, and banking reform and restructuring remain top priorities. Shortly after the end of FY 2000, the Board of the International Monetary Fund gave its vote of confidence to the government's recent performance by approving the third annual Poverty Reduction and Growth Facility Loan for Tajikistan. Improved fiscal discipline by the Government of Tajikistan has supported the return to positive economic growth. The government budget was nearly in balance in 2001 and the government's 2002 budget targets a fiscal deficit of 0.3% of GDP, including recent increases in social sector spending.

The following table shows the main economic indicators in 1997–2024. Inflation below 5% is in green.

Year	GDP (in billion US$ PPP)	GDP per capita (in US$ PPP)	GDP (in billion US$ nominal)	GDP growth (real)	Inflation (in Percent)	Gov. debt (Percentage of GDP)
1993	6.43	1,154	0.68	▼−11.1%	▲2,600.7%	n/a
1994	▼5.17	▼921	▲0.83	▼−21.4%	▲350.4%	n/a
1995	▼4.61	▼814	▼0.57	▼−12.5%	▲612.5%	n/a
1996	▼4.49	▼784	▲1.05	▼−4.4%	▲418.5%	n/a
1997	▲4.65	▲798	▲1.12	▲1.7%	▲88.0%	n/a
1998	▲4.95	▲834	▲1.32	▲5.3%	▲43.2%	▲96.6%
1999	▲5.21	▲851	▼1.09	▲3.7%	▲27.5%	▲107.8%
2000	▲5.77	▲928	▼0.99	▲8.3%	▲32.9%	▲111.4%
2001	▲6.50	▲1,027	▲1.06	▲10.2%	▲38.6%	▼99.4%
2002	▲7.20	▲1,116	▲1.21	▲9.1%	▲12.2%	▼98.3%
2003	▲8.09	▲1,230	▲1.56	▲10.2%	▲16.4%	▼69.8%
2004	▲9.19	▲1,369	▲2.07	▲10.6%	▲7.2%	▼49.4%
2005	▲10.11	▲1,475	▲2.31	▲6.7%	▲7.3%	▼45.8%
2006	▲11.15	▲1,593	▲2.81	▲7.0%	▲10.0%	▼36.8%
2007	▲12.35	▲1,726	▲3.71	▲7.8%	▲13.2%	▼34.3%
2008	▲13.58	▲1,858	▲5.14	▲7.9%	▲20.4%	▼30.2%
2009	▲14.20	▲1,900	▼4.98	▲3.9%	▲6.4%	▲36.9%
2010	▲15.30	▲2,002	▲5.64	▲6.5%	▲6.5%	▼36.8%
2011	▲16.77	▲2,146	▲6.52	▲7.4%	▲12.4%	▼35.5%
2012	▲18.37	▲2,297	▲7.59	▲7.5%	▲5.8%	▼32.5%
2013	▲20.06	▲2,453	▲8.51	▲7.4%	▲5.0%	▼29.3%
2014	▲21.78	▲2,604	▲9.24	▲6.7%	▲6.1%	▼27.9%
2015	▲23.30	▲2,726	▼7.86	▲6.0%	▲5.8%	▲35.0%
2016	▲25.15	▲2,879	▼6.99	▲6.9%	▲5.9%	▲42.2%
2017	▲27.41	▲3,073	▲7.54	▲7.1%	▲7.3%	▲46.3%
2018	▲28.57	▲3,137	▲7.76	▲7.6%	▼3.8%	▲46.6%
2019	▲32.97	▲3,549	▲8.30	▲7.4%	▲7.8%	▼43.5%
2020	▲35.62	▲3,760	▼8.13	▲4.4%	▲8.6%	▲51.8%
2021	▲39.73	▲4,114	▲8.93	▲9.4%	▲9.0%	▼42.1%
2022	▲45.96	▲4,673	▲10.49	▲8.0%	▲6.6%	▼32.5%
2023	▲51.55	▲5,148	▲11.86	▲8.3%	▼3.7%	▼30.9%
2024	▲56.37	▲5,533	▲13.00	▲6.8%	▼4.5%	▼30.7%

== Gross domestic product ==
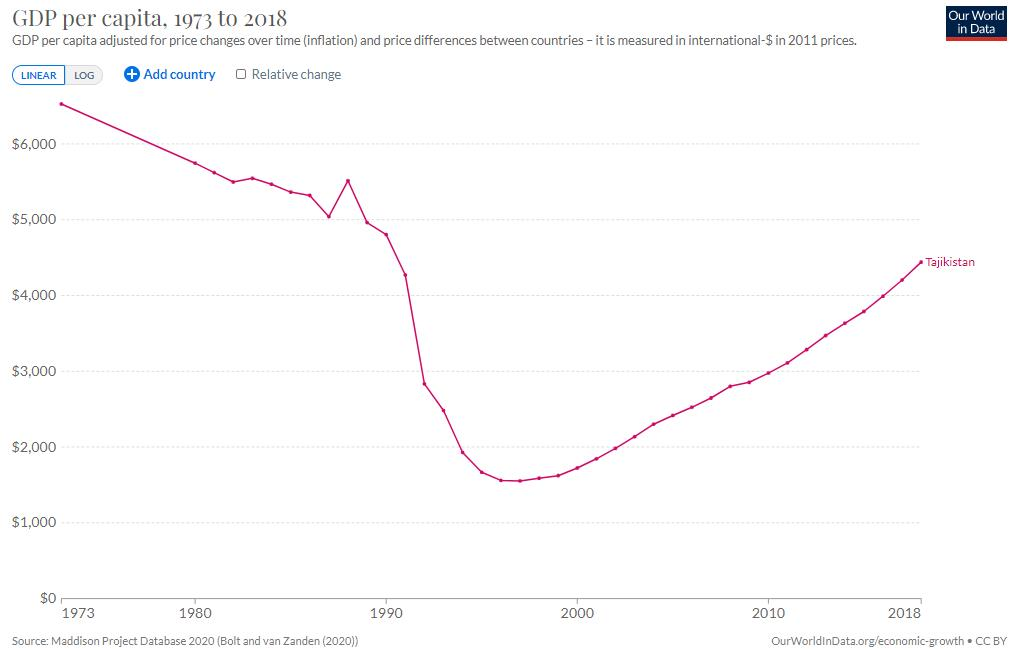
Real GPD per capita development of Tajikistan

In 2005 Tajikistan's GDP grew by 6.7%, to about US$1.89 billion, and growth for 2006 was about 8%, marking the fifth consecutive year of annual growth exceeding 6%. The official forecast for GDP growth in 2007 is 7.5%. Per capita GDP in 2005 was US$258, lowest among the 15 countries of the former Soviet Union. In 2005 services contributed 48%, agriculture 23.4%, and industry 28.6% to GDP. The recent global recession has reduced Tajikistan's GDP growth rate to 2.8% in the first half of 2009. Remittances from expatriate Tajikistanis is estimated to account for 30-50% of Tajikistan's GDP.

== Sectors ==
=== Agriculture ===
Although the government has announced an expedited land reform program, many Soviet-era state farms still existed in 2006, and the state retains control of production and harvesting on privatized Dehkan farms. Privatization of cotton farms has been especially slow, and unresolved debts of cotton farmers remained a problem in 2006. In the early 2000s, the major crops were cotton (which occupied one-third of arable land in 2004 but decreased after that date), cereals (mainly wheat), potatoes, vegetables (mainly onions and tomatoes), fruits, and rice. Cotton makes an important contribution to both the agricultural sector and the national economy. Cotton accounts for 60 percent of agricultural output, supports 75 percent of the rural population, and uses 45 percent of irrigated arable land. More than 80% of the 8,800 square kilometers of land in use for agriculture depends on irrigation. Tajikistan must import grain from Kazakhstan and Uzbekistan.

Tajikistan produced in 2018:

- 964 thousand tons of potato;
- 778 thousand tons of wheat;
- 680 thousand tons of onion;
- 641 thousand tons of watermelon;
- 443 thousand tons of tomato;
- 356 thousand tons of carrot;
- 308 thousand tons of vegetable;
- 300 thousand tons of cotton;
- 241 thousand tons of grape;
- 238 thousand tons of apple;
- 237 thousand tons of maize;
- 211 thousand tons of cucumber;
- 116 thousand tons of cabbage;
- 108 thousand tons of barley;
- 90 thousand tons of rice;

In addition to smaller productions of other agricultural products, like apricot (31 thousand tons).

=== Forestry ===
3% of Tajikistan is forested, mainly at elevations between 1,000 and 3,000 meters. No forest region is classified as commercially usable; most are under state protection. Wood production is negligible, but local inhabitants harvest non-wood forest products.

=== Fishing ===
Streams and lakes produce a limited amount of fish, and some fish is produced by aquaculture. In 2003 some 158 tons of fish were caught and 167 tons raised on fish farms.

=== Mining and minerals ===
Tajikistan has rich deposits of gold, silver, and antimony. The largest silver deposits are in Sughd Province, where Tajikistan's largest gold mining operation is also located. Russia's Norilsk nickel company has explored a large new silver deposit at Bolshoy Kanimansur. Tajikistan also produces strontium, salt, lead, zinc, fluorspar, and mercury. Uranium, an important mineral in the Soviet era, remains in some quantity but is no longer extracted. Fossil fuel deposits are limited to coal, of which about 30,000 tons are mined annually. Tajikistan's extensive aluminium processing industry depends entirely on imported ore.

=== Industry and manufacturing ===
The output of most industries declined sharply during the mid-1990s; despite widespread privatization, in the early 2000s industry rallied very slowly. In 2006 an estimated one-third of Tajikistan's 700 major industrial enterprises were completely idle, and the remainder were operating at 20 or 25% of capacity. The causes are outmoded equipment, low investment levels, and lack of markets. To revitalize the sector, in 2006 the government was considering renationalizing some enterprises. Tajikistan's only major heavy industries are aluminium processing and chemical production. The former, which provided 40% of industrial production in 2005, is centered at the Tursunzoda processing plant, the latter in Dushanbe, Qurghonteppa, and Yovon. Aluminium production increased by 6% in 2005. Some small light industrial plants produce textiles and processed foods, using mainly domestic agricultural products. The textile industry processes about 20% of domestically grown cotton. The expansion of light industry output contributed significantly to GDP growth in 2005. The construction industry, about half of which is state-owned, has suffered from low investment in capital projects and from shoddy workmanship that has discouraged international contracts. However, new infrastructure projects and increased housing construction brought a 60% increase in output from 2004 to 2005. As of 2009, one third of industrial plants and factories are inactive, according to Tajikistan's Institute of Economic Studies. Industrial output has fallen by 13% in the first six months of 2009, leading to a fall in export revenues of 48%.

=== Energy ===
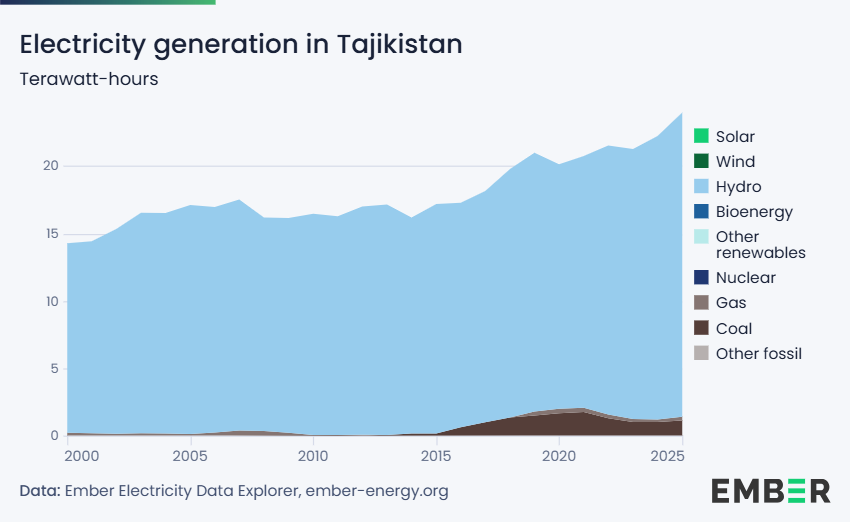
Electricity generation in Tajikistan in terawatt-hours

The rivers of Tajikistan, such as the Vakhsh and the Panj, have great hydropower potential, and the government has focused on attracting investment for projects for internal use and electricity exports. Tajikistan is home to the hydroelectric power station Nurek, the second highest dam in the world. Sangtuda 1 Hydroelectric Power Plant of 670 megawatts (MW) capacity, operated by Russian Inter RAO UES, commenced operations on 18 January 2008 and was officially commissioned on 31 July 2009.

Other projects at the development stage include Sangduta 2 by Iran, Zerafshan by Chinese SinoHydro and Rogun power plant, which, at 335 metres (1,099 ft), is projected to supersede the Nurek Dam as tallest in the world if completed. The Rogun Dam was originally planned to be built by Russia's Inter RAO UES, but following disagreements, Russia pulled out. In 2010, production resumed with Iranian investment and Chinese assistance.

Besides hydropower, other energy resources include sizable coal deposits and smaller reserves of natural gas and petroleum. In December 2010, Russian Gazprom announced discovery of significant natural gas reserves in Sarikamysh gas field with 60 bcm of natural gas, enough for 50 years of Tajikistan's domestic consumption. The national power company is Barqi Tojik.

Tajikistan is a partner country of the EU INOGATE energy programme, which has four key topics: enhancing energy security, convergence of member state energy markets on the basis of EU internal energy market principles, supporting sustainable energy development, and attracting investment for energy projects of common and regional interest.

=== Services ===
Throughout the early 2000s, the overall output of the services sector has increased steadily.

=== Banking ===
The Tajik banking system has improved significantly because of strengthened oversight by the National Bank of Tajikistan, relaxed restrictions on participation by foreign institutions, and regulatory reform. The system includes 16 commercial banks and the central bank, or National Bank. The state controls the system, although in principle most banks have been privatized. An internationally assisted restructuring program was completed in 2003. Banks provide a narrow range of services, concentrating on providing credit to state-owned enterprises. Only an estimated 10% of the capital in Tajikistan moves through the banking system, and small businesses rarely borrow from banks.

Abdujabbor Shirinov, Chairman of the National Bank of Tajikistan announced 142 credit organizations, including 16 banks and 299 their branches, two non-bank financial institutions and 124 microfinance organizations functioned in Tajikistan at the first of 2013.

=== Education ===
Education in Tajikistan consists of four years of primary school followed by two stages of secondary school (lasting five and two years, respectively). Attendance at school is mandatory from age seven to seventeen. In accordance with the Law on Higher Education and Professional Postgraduate Education the country provides for the following levels of higher education:

- Specialist degree (darajai mutakhassis), with studies lasting five years. Five years university degree is equivalent to bachelor (four years) and master's degree (one year).
- Bachelor's degree (darajai bakalavr), with studies lasting not less than four years except for medicine (no less than five years);
- Master's degree (darajai magistr), with studies lasting minimum of one year.

Some higher education institutions still apply an old system by providing specialists degree (darajai mutakhassis) where upon graduation a specialist diploma is awarded, which is equivalently recognized as a master's degree by Higher Education and Professional Postgraduate Education of Tajikistan. On the other hand, some higher education institutions award bachelor's degrees after four years of studying. Thus, those who do not have a bachelor's degree in a specialty cannot start a master's degree. Tajik is the main language of instruction through secondary school, but in 2003 Russian was restored as a mandatory second language.

The Human Rights Measurement Initiative (HRMI) finds that Tajikistan is fulfilling 98.9% of what it should be fulfilling for the right to education based on the country's level of income. HRMI breaks down the right to education by looking at the rights to both primary education and secondary education. While taking into consideration Tajikistan's income level, the nation is achieving 97.9% of what should be possible based on its resources (income) for primary education and 100.o0% for secondary education.

=== Healthcare ===
A diagnostic center in Tajikistan

The Tajikistan health system is influenced by the former Soviet legacy. It is ranked as the poorest country within the WHO European region, including the lowest total health expenditure per capita. Tajikistan is ranked 129th as Human Development Index of 188 countries, with an Index of 0.627 in 2016. In 2016, the SDG Index value was 56. In Tajikistan health indicators such as infant and maternal mortality rates are among the highest of the former Soviet republics. In the post-Soviet era, life expectancy has decreased because of poor nutrition, polluted water supplies, and increased incidence of cholera, malaria, tuberculosis, and typhoid. Because the health care system has deteriorated badly and receives insufficient funding and because sanitation and water supply systems are in declining condition, Tajikistan has a high risk of epidemic disease.

The Human Rights Measurement Initiative finds that Tajikistan is fulfilling 78.1% of what it should be fulfilling for the right to health based on its level of income. When looking at the right to health with respect to children, Tajikistan achieves 96.2% of what is expected based on its current income. In regards to the right to health amongst the adult population, the country achieves 97.5% of what is expected based on the nation's level of income. Tajikistan falls into the "very bad" category when evaluating the right to reproductive health because the nation is fulfilling only 40.8% of what the nation is expected to achieve based on the resources (income) it has available.

=== Retail ===
The Tajik retail sector are largely dominated by traditional open-air bazaars and small independent grocery stores (known locally as maghozai khurokvori). However, shopping malls and supermarkets are rapidly expanding in major urban centers such as Dushanbe.

=== Transport ===
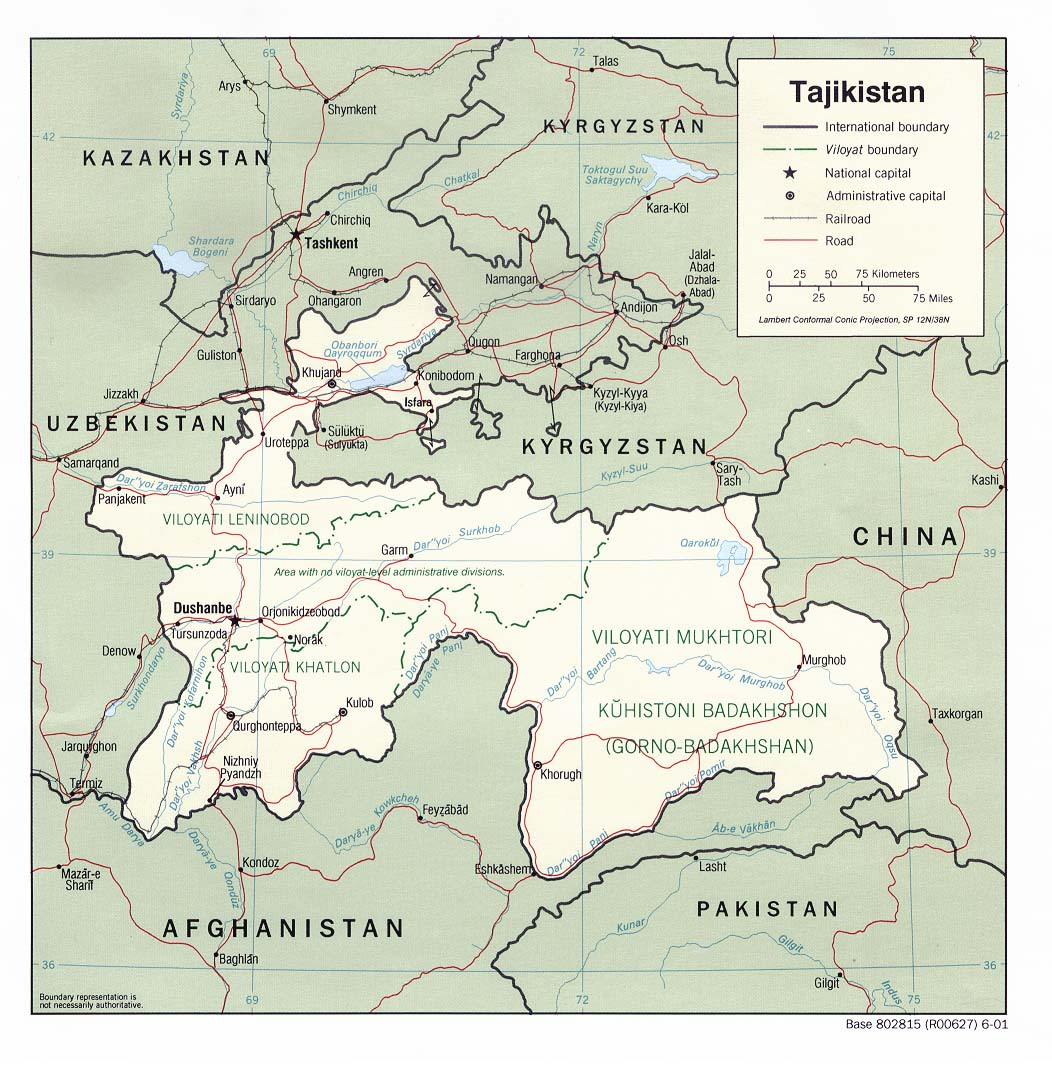
2001 map of Tajikistan including road and rail network

Most of rugged Tajikistan's transportation system was built during the Soviet era, and since that time the system has deteriorated badly because of insufficient investment and maintenance. In 2013, Tajikistan, like many of the other Central Asian countries, was experiencing major development in its transportation sector. Beginning in 2005, a series of major transportation projects begun. The first such project, the Anzob Tunnel, was inaugurated in 2006, providing a year-round road link from Dushanbe to northern Tajikistan.

=== Tourism ===
The tourism industry was devastated by the civil war, but has been re-established in recent years. In 2018, the British Backpacker Society ranked Tajikistan as the 7th best adventure travel destination on earth.

== Labour ==
In 2003 Tajikistan's active labour force was estimated at 3.4 million, of whom 64% were employed in agriculture, 24% in services, and 10% in industry and construction. After declining in the early 2000s, the real wages of state employees were raised in 2004 and 2005. Because of the continued dominance of state farms, the majority of workers are government employees, although only a small number rely completely on wages. Driven by high unemployment, in 2006 an estimated 700,000 workers found seasonal or permanent employment in Russia and other countries. Their remittances, estimated at US$600 million in 2005, are an important economic resource in Tajikistan; in 2004 an estimated 15% of households depended mainly on those payments. In May 2009 remittances to Tajiks had fallen to $525 million, a 34% decline from the previous year. Immediately before the 2008 financial crisis, there were an estimated 1.5 million foreign workers sending remittances back to Tajikistan. In 2006 the average wage was US$27 per month. The national unemployment rate was estimated unofficially as high as 40% in 2006, but in rural areas, unemployment has exceeded 60%. Unemployment has been higher in the southern Khatlon Province than in the northern Soghd Province. Mean wages were $0.66 per man-hour in 2009.

Tajikistan's informal employment sector has been reported to use both child labour and forced labour in the country's cotton industry according to the U.S. Department of Labor's List of Goods Produced by Child Labor or Forced Labor.

== Currency, exchange rate, and inflation ==
The somoni (SM) was introduced in 2000 to replace the Tajikistani rouble, which had been the currency since 1995. In December 2015, some 7 somoni equaled US$1. Throughout the post-Soviet era, inflation has been a serious obstacle to economic growth and improvement of the standard of living. For the years 2001–3, Tajikistan's inflation rates were 33%, 12.2%, and 16.3%, respectively, but in 2004 the rate fell to 6.8%, and the rate for 2005 was 7.1%. In late 2006, inflation approached the 10% level. The official forecast for 2007 is 7%.

== Government budget ==
The year 2004 was the first year of budget deficit after three consecutive years of budget surpluses, which in turn had followed four years of deficits between 1997 and 2000. In 2005 revenues totalled US$442 million (aided by improvements in tax collection), and expenditures were US$542 million, a deficit of US$100 million. The approved 2007 state budget calls for revenues of US$926 million and expenditures of US$954 million, leaving a deficit of US$28 million.

== Foreign economic relations and trade ==
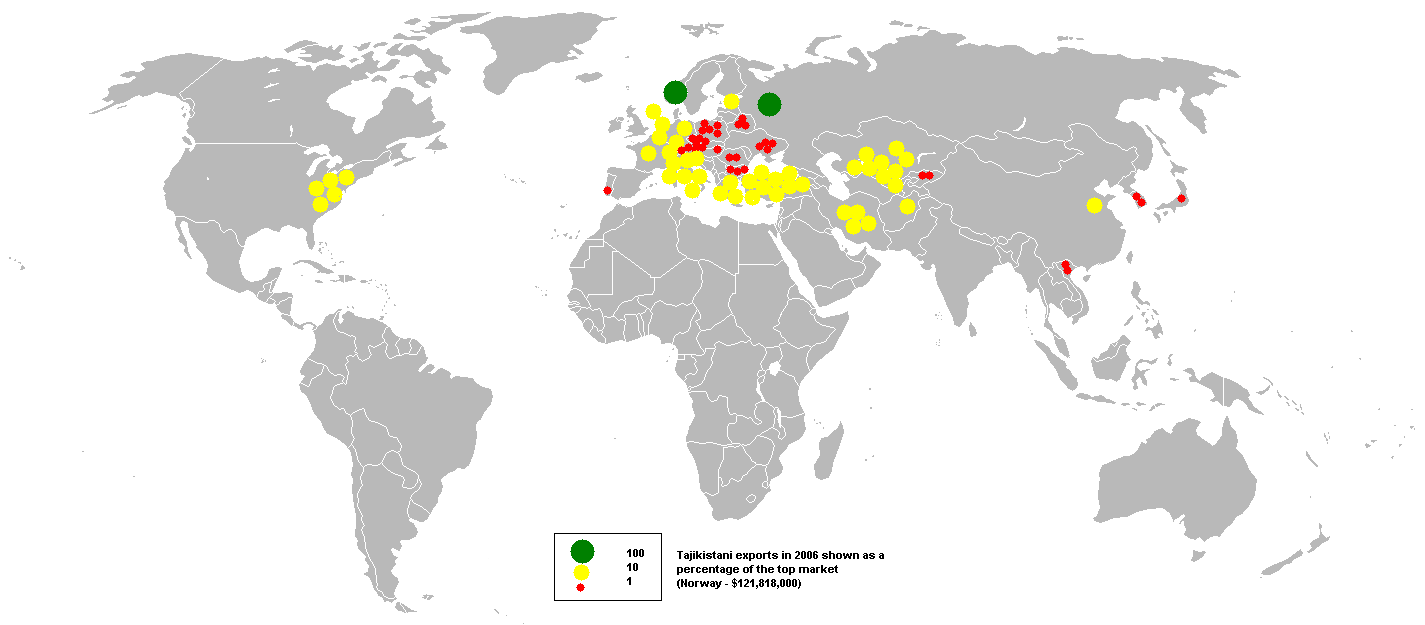
Tajikistani exports in 2006

Exports of Tajikistan by product category (2019) Chemical products Transportation Machines Mineral products Plastics and rubbers Metals Foodstuffs Precious metals Textiles Instruments Animal products Vegetable products Paper goods Footwear and headwear Miscellaneous Stone and glass Wood products Animal and vegetable bi-products Animal hides Arts and antiques Weapons

In the post-Soviet era, Tajikistan has substantially shifted its markets away from the former Soviet republics; in 2005, more than 80% of total exports went to customers outside the Commonwealth of Independent States (CIS), including more than 70% to countries of the European Union (EU) and Turkey. However, because most of Tajikistan's food and energy are imported from CIS countries, in 2005 only about 53% of total trade activity was outside the CIS. In 2005, the top overall buyers of Tajikistan's exports, in order of value, were the Netherlands, Turkey, Russia, Uzbekistan, Latvia, and Iran. Besides aluminium, which accounts for more than half of export value, the main export commodities are cotton, electric power, fruits, vegetable oils, and textiles. In 2005 the largest suppliers of Tajikistan's imports, in order of value, were Russia, Kazakhstan, Uzbekistan, Azerbaijan, China, and Ukraine. Those import rankings are determined largely by the high value of fuels and electric power that Tajikistan buys from its neighbours. Another significant import is alumina (aluminium oxide) to supply the aluminium industry. The major suppliers of alumina are Azerbaijan, Kazakhstan, and Ukraine.

Tajikistan has suffered trade deficits throughout the post-Soviet era. In 2003, the deficit was US$97 million, based on exports of US$705 million and imports of US$802 million. In 2004, exports were worth US$736 million and imports, US$958 billion, creating a trade deficit of US$222 million. The deficit increased again in 2005, to US$339 million, mainly because cotton exports decreased and domestic demand for goods increased.

In 2005, the current account deficit was US$86 million, having shown a general downward trend since the late 1990s. The estimated current account deficit for both 2006 and 2007 is 4.5% of GDP, or about US$90 million in 2006. In 2005 the overall balance of payments was US$14 million. The estimated overall balance of payments for 2006 is US$8 million.

At the end of 2006, Tajikistan's external debt was estimated at US$830 million, most of which was long-term international debt. This amount grew steadily through the 1990s and early 2000s because of state borrowing policy. In 2004 Tajikistan eliminated about 20% of its external debt by exchanging debt to Russia for Russian ownership of the Nurek space tracking station, and by 2006, rescheduling negotiations had reduced the debt by about two-thirds as a percentage of gross domestic product.

In the early 2000s, foreign direct investment has remained low because of political and economic instability, corruption, the poor domestic financial system, and Tajikistan's geographic isolation. The establishment of businesses nearly always requires bribing officials and often encounters resistance from entrepreneurs with government connections. To attract foreign investment and technology, Tajikistan has offered to establish free economic zones in which firms receive advantages on taxes, fees, and customs. In 2004, the parliament passed a law on free economic zones and in 2008 passed a decree creating two zones: the Panj Free Economic Zone and the Sughd Free Economic Zone.

In 2003 foreign direct investment totaled US$41 million; it increased to US$272 million in 2004 because of the debt-reduction transaction with Russia. In the first half of 2005, the figure was US$16 million. Beginning in 2005, the Russian Rusal aluminium company resumed operations to complete the hydroelectric station at Rogun on the Vakhsh River and expand aluminium production at the Tursunzade plant. That plant was scheduled for possible sale to Rusal in 2007. Also in 2005, Russia and Iran resumed work on the Vakhsh River Sangtuda hydroelectric project. Gazprom, the Russian natural gas monopoly, allocated US$12 million for oil and gas exploration in Tajikistan in 2007 after spending US$7 million in 2006. In 2005 the Russian telecommunications company VimpelCom bought a controlling share of Tajikistan's Tacom mobile telephone company. As of 2006, Turkey tentatively planned to invest in a luxury hotel and a cotton processing plant.

=== WTO ===
Tajikistan joined the World Trade Organization (WTO) on 2 March 2013, becoming the 159th country to join the organization. The Working Party on the accession of Tajikistan was established by the General Council on 18 July 2001. Tajikistan completed its membership negotiations on 26 October 2012, when the Working Party adopted the accession package. The General Council approved the accession on 10 December 2012. The Working Party held its sixth meeting in July 2011 to continue the examination of Tajikistan's foreign trade regime. As part of bilateral market access negotiations, Tajikistan agreed to lower tariffs on cooking equipment, refrigerators, ovens and water heaters in discussions to gain Thailand's backing. Earlier, the government of Tajikistan confirmed that it had concluded negotiations with Japan, and had received support from the nation for its accession in an agreement signed on July 31, 2012.

== See also ==
- List of companies of Tajikistan
- Corruption in Tajikistan
- Ministry of Finance of Tajikistan
- Ministry of Economic Development and Trade (Tajikistan)
- National Bank of Tajikistan
- Science and technology in Tajikistan
- Tajikistan and the World Bank
- Visa policy of Tajikistan
- Economy of Central Asia
