= List of banks in Tajikistan =

This is a list of banks in Tajikistan. In addition to the central bank, there are 17 licensed commercial banks as of September 30, 2018, including branches of foreign banks. Other deposit-taking and credit extending institutions in the country consist of 25 microcredit deposit organizations, 6 microcredit organizations and 31 microcredit funds.

== Central bank ==
- National Bank of Tajikistan

== Commercial banks ==
Full name	Call name	Established	Majority Owner	Capital	Website
OJSC "Orienbank"	Orienbank	1921		(Tajikistan)	orienbank.tj
SSB of RT "Amonatbank"	Amonatbank	1885	Ministry of Finance	(Tajikistan)	new.amonatbonk.tj/en
OJSC "Eskhata bank"	Bank Eskhata	29 November 1994	Nosirov family	(Tajikistan)	eskhata.com/en
OJSC "Tawhidbank"	Tawhidbank	24 August 1999		(Tajikistan)	tawhidbank.tj/en
CJSC "The First MicroFinanceBank"	ICB	August 2003	Aga Khan Development Network	(Pakistan)	fmfb.tj/en
CJSC "Bonki Rushdi Tojikiston"	BRT	2006		(Tajikistan)	brt.tj/en
CJSC "Halyk Bank Tajikistan"	Halyk Bank	2017	Halyk Bank	(Kazakhstan)	halykbank.tj/en
CJSC “Kafolatbank”	Kafolat Bank	2005	Sarmayeh Bank	(Iran)	kafolatbank.tj/en
CJSC Bank “Arvand”	Bank Arvand	2002	MLC Frontiers, LLC	(Kyrgyzstan)	arvand.tj/en
CJSC "Spitamen Bank"	Spitamen Bank	2008	Spitamen Insurance	(Tajikistan)	spitamenbank.tj/en
CJSC "International Bank of Tajikistan"	IBT	April 2014	Tajik Catering Service	(Tajikistan)	ibt.tj/en
OJSC "Commerce Bank of Tajikistan"	CBT	2000	Sughurtai Avvalini Milli	(Tajikistan)	cbt.tj
Alif Bank OJSC	Alif	2014	Alif Capital Holdings Limited	(Tajikistan)	alif.tj
CJSC "Dushanbe city bank"	Dushanbe City Bank	no data	private	(Tajikistan)	dc.tj
SUEIEBT "Sanoatsodirotbonk"	SSB	August 2020	Ministry of Finance	(Tajikistan)	ssb.tj
Foreign bank branch(es)
"Tijorat" Bank Branch IRI in Dushanbe	Tejarat Bank Dushanbe	10 August 1995	Tejarat Bank	(Iran)	tejaratbank.tj/en

== Commercial banks in the process of liquidation ==
- Agroinvestbank
- Tojiksodirotbank
- Tajprombank
- Fononbank
- Bank Asia (formerly Kont Investment Bank)
- NBP Pakistan Subsidiary Bank in Tajikistan
