= List of companies of Tajikistan =

Location of Tajikistan

Tajikistan is a country located in Central Asia. Tajikistan's economy is largely directed by agriculture and has a dependency on the production of cotton and aluminum. In 2021, Tajikistan was one of the world's largest producers of antimony. The three main import partners of Tajikistan in 2019 were Kazakhstan, Turkey, and Luxembourg and the three main export partners of Tajikistan in 2019 were Turkey, Switzerland, and Uzbekistan.

== Notable firms ==
This list includes notable companies with a primary headquarters located in the country. The industry and sector both follow the Industry Classification Benchmark taxonomy and organizations that have discontinued operations are included and noted as defunct.

Notable companies Status: P=Private, S=State; A=Active, D=Defunct
Name	Industry	Sector	Headquarters	Founded	Notes	Status	
AccessBank Tajikistan	Financials	Banks	Dushanbe	2010	Defunct 2019	P	D
Asia Airways	Consumer services	Airlines	Dushanbe	2007	Defunct 2015	P	D
Bank Eskhata	Financials	Banks	Khujand	1994	Provides banking services	P	A
First MicroFinance Bank	Financials	Banks	Dushanbe	2003	Offers microfinance services	P	A
National Bank of Tajikistan	Financials	Banks	Dushanbe	1991	Central bank of Tajikistan	S	A
Orienbank	Financials	Banks	Dushanbe	1925	One of the oldest banks of Tajikistan	P	A
Somon Air	Consumer services	Airlines	Dushanbe	2007	International airline	P	A
Spitamen Bank	Financials	Banks	Dushanbe	2008	Operates under license from the National Bank of Tajikistan	P	A
Tajik Air	Consumer services	Airlines	Dushanbe	1924	Owned by the Government of Tajikistan	S	A
Tajik Post	Industrial transportation	Delivery services	Dushanbe	1991	The postal service of Tajikistan	S	A
