= Corruption in Tajikistan =

Corruption in Tajikistan is a widespread phenomenon that is found in all spheres of Tajik society. The situation is essentially similar to that in the other former Soviet republics of Central Asia. Reliable specifics about corruption can be difficult to come by, however, as can hard information about the effectiveness of supposed anti-corruption initiatives.

Corruption, according to a 2015 article in The Diplomat, is present in every aspect of Tajikistan's culture. Examples include students paying bribes for better grades, bribes for the release of prisoners, and “smugglers tipping border guards to look the other way” as well as many others. Freedom House said much the same thing in 2016, calling corruption a problem affecting every aspect of Tajik society.

According to Transparency International, citizens of Tajikistan consider government bureaucrats and services to be the most corrupt institutions, with police, customs, and tax-collection authorities at the top of the list, followed by college and hospital administrators. In a 2010 survey, Tajikistanis said they were most likely to be confronted with bribery during dealings with the traffic police (53.6%), followed closely by land purchases (53.3%) and dealings with universities (45.4%). Almost two-thirds believed that the level of corruption in the country was high and unlikely to change soon; about half thought that most officials take bribes; and about half viewed corruption negatively.

== Background ==
It originated as part of the Corruption in the Soviet Union.

Tajikistan gained independence in 1991, when the Soviet Union collapsed, and the ensuing civil war, waged from 1992 to 1997, left the people largely apathetic and passive in the face of a government authority. Landlocked and poor in natural resources, Tajikistan remains the poorest and least developed of the former Soviet republics, with half of the inhabitants living on less than US$2 a day. Many Tajiks have emigrated to Russia or Kazakhstan, and the large amounts of money they send back home make Tajikistan one of the more remittance-dependent countries on earth. There are, moreover, major problems with organized crime, drug trafficking, religious extremism, and drug abuse.

== Scale of corruption ==
Transparency International's Corruption Perceptions Index scores 182 countries according to the perceived corruption of the public sector and then ranks those countries by their score. In the 2025 Index, the country whose public sector was perceived to be most honest received a score of 89 (out of 100) and a rank of 1; the country whose public sector was perceived as most corrupt, a score of 9 and a rank of 181 (in a two-way tie). The average score was 42. Tajikistan received a score of 19 and a rank of 166. For comparison with regional scores, the best score among Eastern European and Central Asian countries (Note: Albania, Armenia, Azerbaijan, Belarus, Bosnia and Herzegovina, Georgia, Kazakhstan, Kosovo, Kyrgyzstan, Moldova, Montenegro, North Macedonia, Russia, Serbia, Tajikistan, Turkey, Turkmenistan, Ukraine, Uzbekistan) was 50, the average score was 34 and the worst score was 17.

Tajikistan received a score of 9 out of 100, for control of corruption on the World Bank’s 2009 Worldwide Governance Indicators (WGI). This score represented a drop from 18 in 2007.

=== Perceptions ===
In a 2010 survey by the United Nations Development Programme, almost 80% of respondents said their country was corrupt.

== Government corruption ==
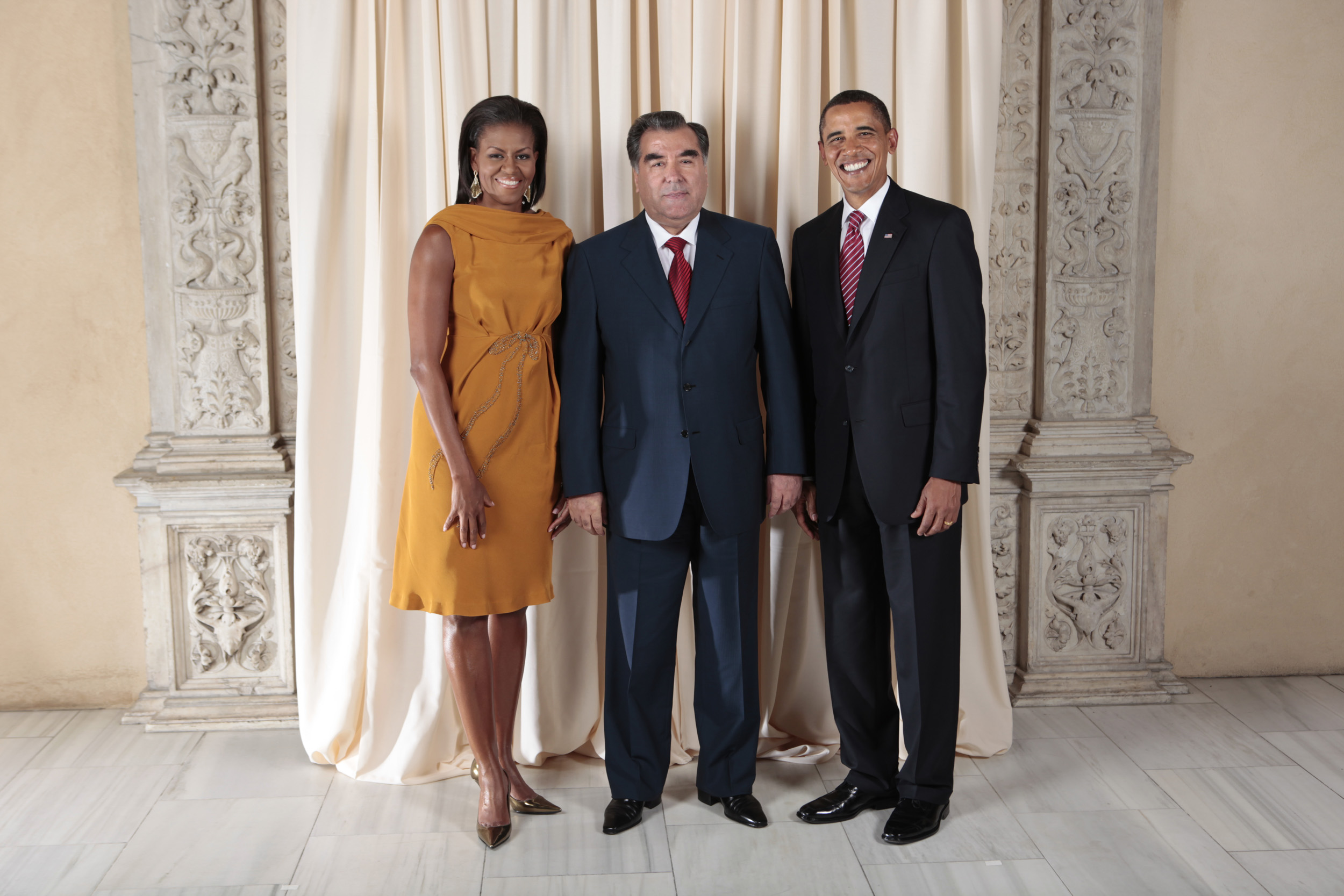
President Emomali Rakhmon with President Barack Obama and wife Michelle Obama

Tajikistan is not considered a free country; Freedom House has called the country's multi-party system a "democratic façade." Government employees and officials often extort money from citizens, especially from civil servants. For instance, some public employees were required to buy shares in the Rogun Dam in order to keep their jobs.

Owing to corruption, incompetence, and a lack of public resources and facilities, the country's government administration is highly inefficient, and bribery is common. Farmers and entrepreneurs in particular have to deal with corrupt officials on a regular basis.

The current regime is awash in patronage, cronyism, and self-enrichment. Political and economic power is concentrated in the hands of the family of Emomali Rakhmon, president since 1992. The government has ties to organized crime and accountability is rarely present.

U.S. diplomatic cables leaked in 2010 noted that members of Rakhmon's family and inner circle are widely viewed as being the most corrupt people in the country. An example of the problem of nepotism at the highest level is Rakhmon's son Rustam Emomali, who by his mid-20s had already been a member of the Dushanbe city council, head of the Tajikistan Football Federation, owner of a major football club, head of the Customs Service, and head of the country's anti-corruption agency. In January 2017, Rustam Emomali was appointed Mayor of Dushanbe, a key position, which is seen by some analysts as the next step to the top of the government. Similarly, the president made his daughter Ozoda Emomali the deputy minister of foreign affairs in 2009, and five years later appointed her as first deputy minister. Her husband, Jamoliddin Nuraliyev, became first deputy finance minister in 2008 and a deputy chairman of the National Bank in 2015.

Generally speaking, details of government budgets are not made available to the public. Government officials and high-level employees are required by law to disclose their assets, but their declarations are never audited.

Corrupt Tajik officials have siphoned billions of dollars from state-owned banks and enterprises into offshore accounts. According to the IMF, about $3.5 billion, or more than a third of the country's annual GDP, has ended up in such accounts. The state-run Talco aluminum smelter is owned by British Virgin Islands-based firms, and its revenue, instead of being returned to the state budget, has been used as a slush fund for Tajik officials.

=== Elections ===
Elections are characterized by massive fraud, and members of opposition parties are routinely bought off, threatened, exiled, or imprisoned. While the law limits donations allowed to be made to political parties from a person and candidates, the financial accounts of parties and politicians are not audited.

=== Judiciary ===
Although the judiciary is nominally independent, in practice it is under the control of the president, who has the power to hire and fire judges at will. President Rakhmon's power over the courts has intensified over time. Judges are widely viewed as incompetent, and many of them solicit illegal payments in order to settle cases or release inmates from prison. Conflicts of interest in legal cases are common, with no safeguards readily available.

=== Impunity ===
The degree to which corrupt leaders in Tajikistan enjoy impunity is reflected in the case of Muradali Alimardon. Despite being found in 2009 to have made $550 million in illicit loans to family-related projects, Alimardon was promoted from National Bank chairman to deputy prime minister, after which, according to The Economist, he took $120 million more in unauthorized loans from state-owned Agroinvestbank.

== Police ==
Police officers, especially traffic police, are viewed as being highly corrupt. In particular, they are seen as catering to elites, who are virtually immune from arrest and prosecution, rather than serving citizens. Police salaries, moreover, are low, and officers routinely solicit bribes to supplement their incomes. Many members of the police force also collaborate with organized criminals, notably drug smugglers. As of 2012, about a third of Tajikistan's GDP came from heroin trafficking, which, according to the U.S. State Department, occurs with the aid of law enforcement and government officials.

== Business ==
Business executives in Tajikistan, according to the World Economic Forum’s 2013 Global Competitiveness Report, view corruption as the fourth largest obstacle to business in Tajikistan, behind tax rates, government regulations, and poor access to financing. In 2015, Tajikistan ranked 166th out of 189 countries on the World Bank's Ease of Doing Business ranking place, placing it at the bottom of the Europe and Central Asia region. According to a 2008 World Bank survey, over 44% of business people say they were expected to present civil servants with “gifts,” and over a third had experienced bribery demands during the previous year.

== Healthcare ==
Health workers are generally not well paid and rely on gifts and bribes to supplement their income. Many citizens must pay bribes in order to receive supposedly free medical care or to secure a hospital bed. Since many healthcare professionals received their degrees as a result of payment instead of education, the quality of care is often poor, and the best practitioners can demand an even higher bribe than might otherwise be asked. Conventional knowledge is that those who can afford it would better spend their money bribing a customs official for a visa to Russia to access healthcare there.

== Universities ==
As a rule, young people must pay sizeable bribes to get into universities and receive better grades. A salient example of this is the Tajikistani healthcare system. Many healthcare professionals in Tajikistan receive their degrees in medicine via a two-year university correspondence course, at the end of which there is a single in-person exam. It is understood that the cash turned in to the proctor determines the grade rather than the actual exam result. This is one of numerous factors contributing to the low quality of healthcare in Tajikistan.

The universal corruption in Tajikistani universities is part of the reason that no universities in the country are internationally accredited. Unfortunately, it is also common in secondary and even elementary schools. Teachers or professors who require more bribes from their students are able to bribe their supervisors more and receive promotions whereas teachers or professors who do not accept or offer bribes can be overlooked for promotion or simply fired to be replaced with someone who has bribed school officials. Since all university qualifications are merely purchased, professors and teachers often have no knowledge of their field or teaching ability.

== Anti-corruption activities ==
U.S. diplomatic cables written in 2006 and 2007 and leaked in 2010 called “anti-corruption” a new buzzword in Tajikistan, but suggested that there was little substance to the government's purported efforts on this front. A law passed in 2008 professes to set in place strong safeguards and to protect whistleblowers, but in practice corruption continues to flourish. Similarly, another law professes to guarantee access to government information, but in practice, it is difficult for most citizens to gain such access. The Office of the Human Rights Ombudsman was established in 2008, but the government and judiciary pay little heed to complaints submitted to it. Although the Ombudsman is nominally independent, he is personally appointed by the president and can be replaced by him.

There are laws supposedly requiring transparency in political party financing, but they tend to be ineffective. Other laws require that announcements and tenders be published and that public procurement officials declare their assets, but they are not properly enforced.

The Anti-Corruption Network (ACN) for Eastern Europe and Central Asia was founded by the OECD, European Union, and several banking and business organizations in 1998 to support anti-corruption efforts in the region. In 2003, the ACN launched an initiative which involves producing country reviews for Tajikistan and seven other countries. Tajikistan has been a member of the United Nations Convention against Corruption (UNCAC) since 2006. Since 2012, the OSCE's Tajikistan office has contained a Good Governance Unit, which seeks to work with the government to fight corruption. Also, Tajikistan is one of four countries in the region chosen by the World Bank to test its Country Governance and Anti-Corruption process.

The ineffectiveness of purported anti-corruption efforts is reflected in the fact that the nation's agency for the state's control of its budget and opposing corruption is generally viewed as one of the country's most corrupt institutions. Most of those who are prosecuted for corruption by the agency are employed in the lower rungs of the civil service, with the bulk of prosecutions occurring in the health, education, and agriculture sectors. This agency, formed in 2007, is under Rakhmon's control, not parliament's, guaranteeing that no one will be prosecuted for corruption without his personal approval. In an example of the high-level nepotism that is well-nigh ubiquitous in Tajikistan, the agency has been headed since March 2015 by Rakhmon's son Rustam.

A June 2015 report noted that Rustam had just arrested Hasan Rajabov (sometimes transliterated as Khasan Radzhabov), an adviser to the president, on corruption charges. Rajabov was accused of massive embezzlement and soliciting bribes. Also arrested was Izzattullo Azizov, a member of the state religious affairs committee, who was accused of soliciting $2,000 in bribes from Muslims wanting to travel to Mecca for the hajj. In addition, Rustam has arrested several other senior officials for corruption.

One problem with anti-corruption efforts is that persons in power routinely use corruption allegations to try to bring down their political opponents. In June 2016, a government newspaper accused Muhiddin Kabiri, the exiled leader of the opposition, of illicit property purchases, and he has avoided prosecution only by staying abroad. Zaid Saidov, a former industry minister who had attempted to establish an opposition party, was targeted with corruption charges in 2013 and was arrested and sentenced to 51 years in prison.

A May 2014 OECD report called on Tajikistan to step up its fight against corruption. While praising the country for passing anti-corruption laws, the OECD urged the regime to enforce those laws.

== See also ==
- International Anti-Corruption Academy
- Group of States Against Corruption
- International Anti-Corruption Day
- ISO 37001 Anti-bribery management systems
- United Nations Convention against Corruption
- OECD Anti-Bribery Convention
- Transparency International
