= Rogun Dam =

Under-construction dam in southern Tajikistan

Roghun Dam
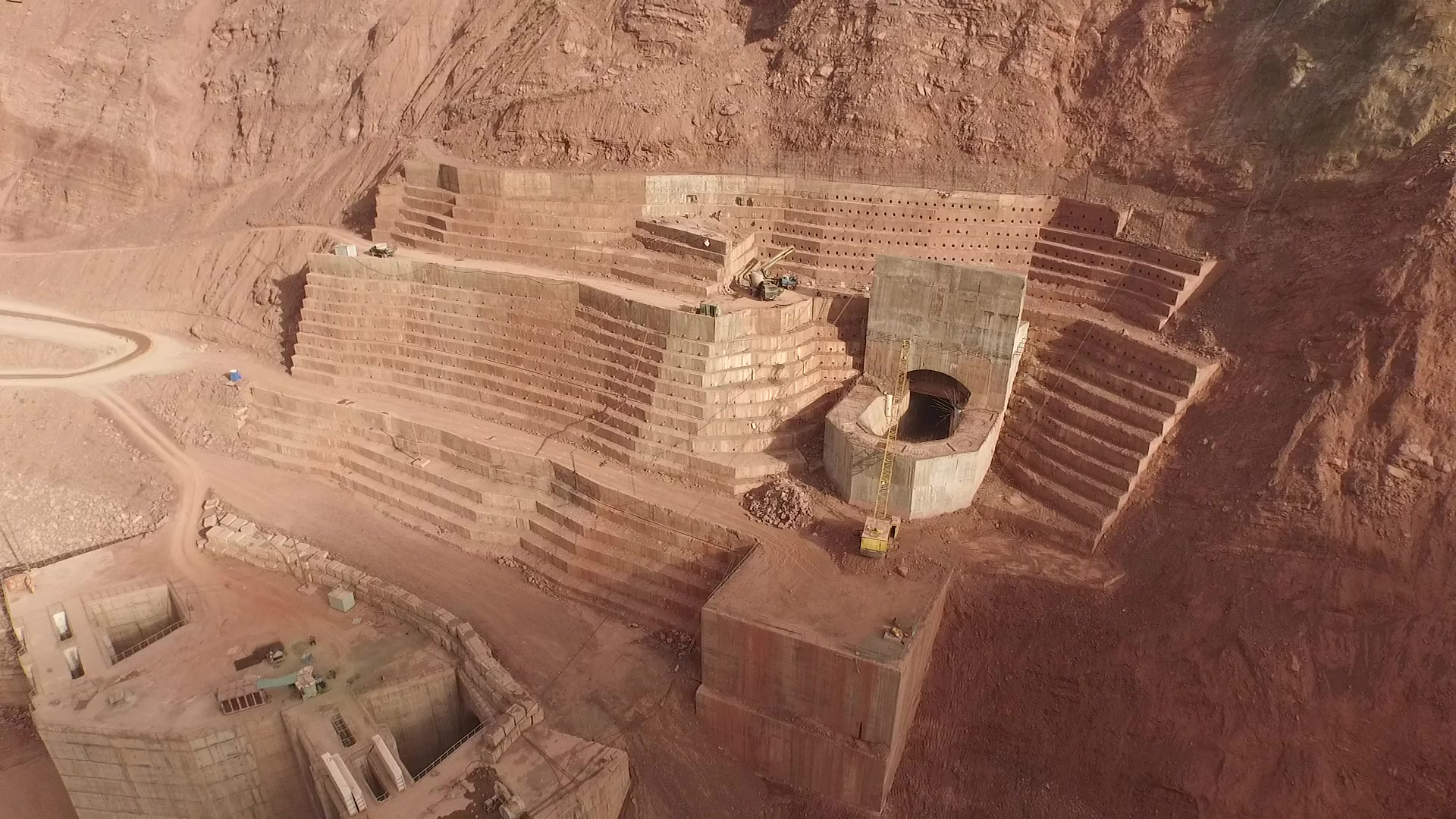

- Location within Tajikistan
- Location: Southern Tajikistan
- Coordinates: 38°40′59″N 69°46′19″E
- Status: Under construction
- Construction began: 1976
- Opening date: 2018-2029
- Construction cost: US$2–5billion
- Built by: Webuild SpA
- Owner: Government of Tajikistan

Dam and spillways
- Impounds: Vakhsh River
- Height: 335 metres (1,099 ft)
- Elevation at crest: 1,232 metres (4,042 ft)

Reservoir
- Total capacity: 13.3 km^{3} (10,782,485 acre⋅ft)
- Surface area: 110.7 km^{2} (27,400 acres)

Power Station
- Turbines: 6 x 600 MW (planned)
- Installed capacity: 240 MW (installed); 3,600 MW (planned)
- Annual generation: 17 TWh (61 PJ)

The Roghun Dam (Russian: Рогунская ГЭС; Tajik: Нерӯгоҳи барқи обии Роғун) is an embankment dam under construction on the Vakhsh River in southern Tajikistan. The dam is situated 110 km from Dushanbe. It is one of the planned hydroelectric power plants of Vakhsh Cascade.

Construction of the dam began in the Soviet era, in 1976, but was abandoned in 1993 after the collapse of the Soviet Union. Over three decades only preliminary construction had been carried out on the dam. Due to its controversial state, construction was suspended in August 2012 pending World Bank reports. The project was restarted by the Tajik government in 2016. The power plant's first unit was commissioned in November 2018 and second in September 2019, both on lower hydraulic head.

Since the time both were part of the USSR, the dam has been steadily opposed by the government of the neighbouring Uzbekistan, which fears it will negatively impact its lucrative cotton crops. The dispute over the project has contributed significantly to bitter relations between the two former Soviet republics.

== History ==
The Roghun Dam was first proposed in 1959 and a technical scheme was developed by 1965. Construction began in 1976, however the project stalled after the collapse of the Soviet Union. An agreement on finishing the construction was signed between Tajikistan and Russia in 1994. Since the agreement was not implemented, it was denounced by Tajikistan parliament. In October 2004, an agreement was signed with RUSAL in which RUSAL agreed to complete the Rogun facility, to build a new aluminum plant and to rebuild the Tursunzade Aluminum Smelter. In February 2007, a new partnership between Russia and Tajikistan to complete the dam was announced, but later was refused by Russia because of disagreement concerning the controlling stake in the project. In May 2008, Tajikistan announced that construction of the dam had resumed. By December 2010, one of the river diversion tunnels was renovated and the second expected to commence in June or July 2011. Construction of the dam was suspended in August 2012 pending the World Bank assessment.

In 2010, Tajikistan launched an IPO to raise US$1.4billion to finish construction of the dam. By April 26 of that year the Tajik government had raised just US$184 million, enough for two years of construction. On July 1, 2016 the state commission in charge of the project had chosen the Italian company Salini Impregilo to carry out the construction for $3.9 billion. The project is broken down into four components, with the most expensive one involving the building of a 335-meter-high rockfill dam which will entail costs of around $1.95 billion. On October 29, 2016 Tajik president Emomali Rahmon officially launched the construction of the dam. At the ceremony, the river's flow was ceremonially diverted through the reconstructed diversion tunnels. The power plant's first unit was commissioned in November 2018 and second in September 2019.

In mid-July 2022 concrete pouring commenced on the main dam core.

== Technical description ==
Rogun was listed as the highest dam in the world for many years — 335 metres (1,099 ft) high — but this was only ever a projected height. In reality the dam was only circa 60.96 metres (200.0 ft) high until 1993 when it was destroyed in a flood. As of 2014 three projects were under consideration: the original, 335-metre (1,099 ft), and two alternatives, 300-metre (980 ft) and 265-metre (869 ft), all having their advantages and drawbacks.

The hydroelectric power plant is expected to have six turbines with combined capacity of 3600 MW. When complete, it is expected to produce 17.1 TWh of electrical work per year.

== Impact assessment ==
In response to the request of the bordering countries and especially Uzbekistan, the World Bank has financed the Techno-Economic Assessment Study (TEAS) conducted by consortium of Coyne et Bellier, Electroconsult and IPA Energy + Water Economics, and Environmental and Social Impact Assessment (ESIA) conducted by Pöyry. The reports, originally slated to be released in February 2012, were delayed until mid-2014. The ESIA was published on 16 June 2014 and the TEAS in July 2014. Overall, the ESIA stated that "Most impacts are rather small and easily mitigated, if mitigation is required at all." and that "There is no impact of the category "strong negative, mitigation not possible", which would have to be considered as a no-go for the project." All parties, including Central Asian states met in Almaty in July 2014 for the 5th Riparian Meeting to discuss findings within the TEAS and ESIA.

== Gallery ==
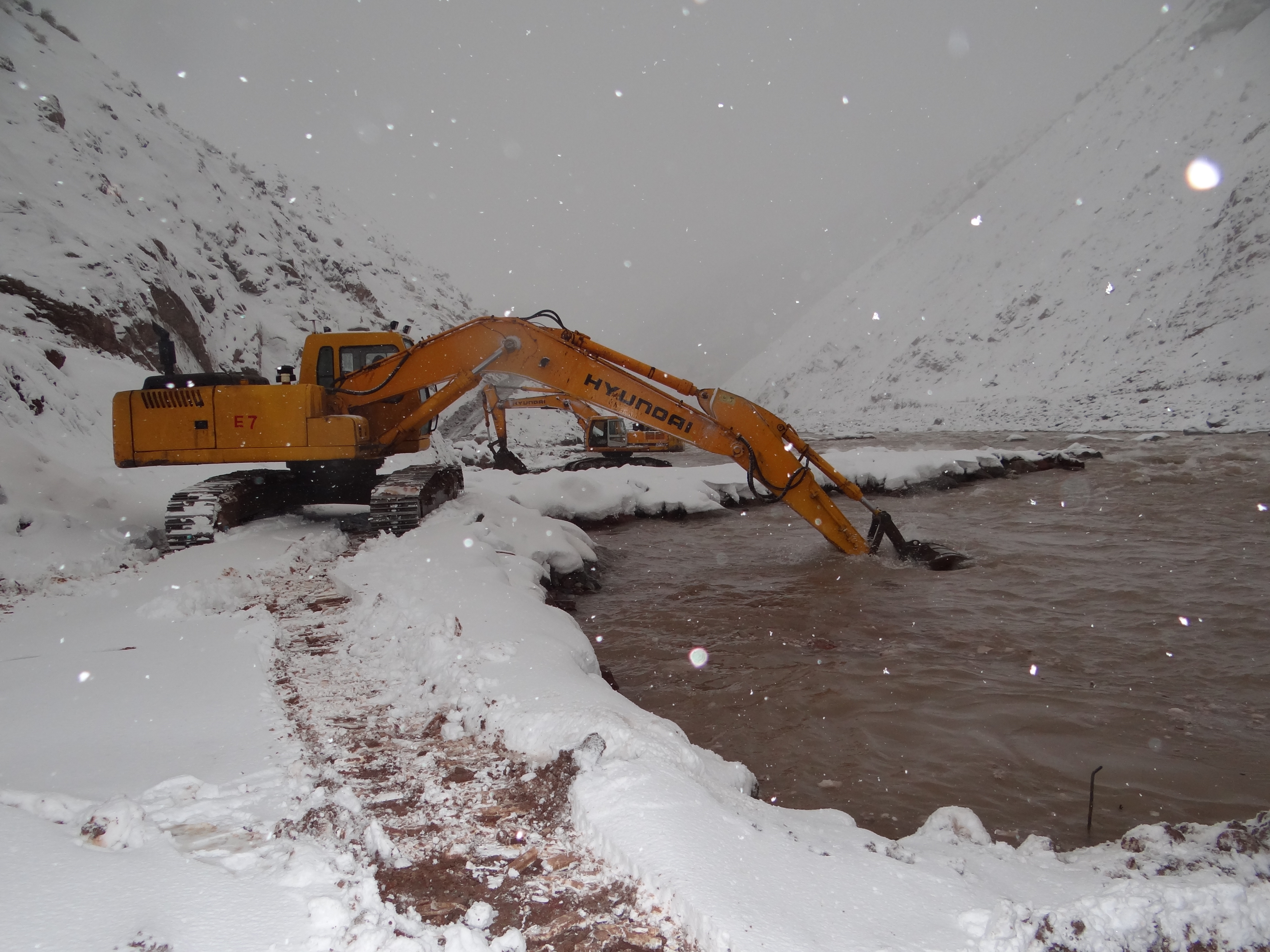
Vakhsh river dredging

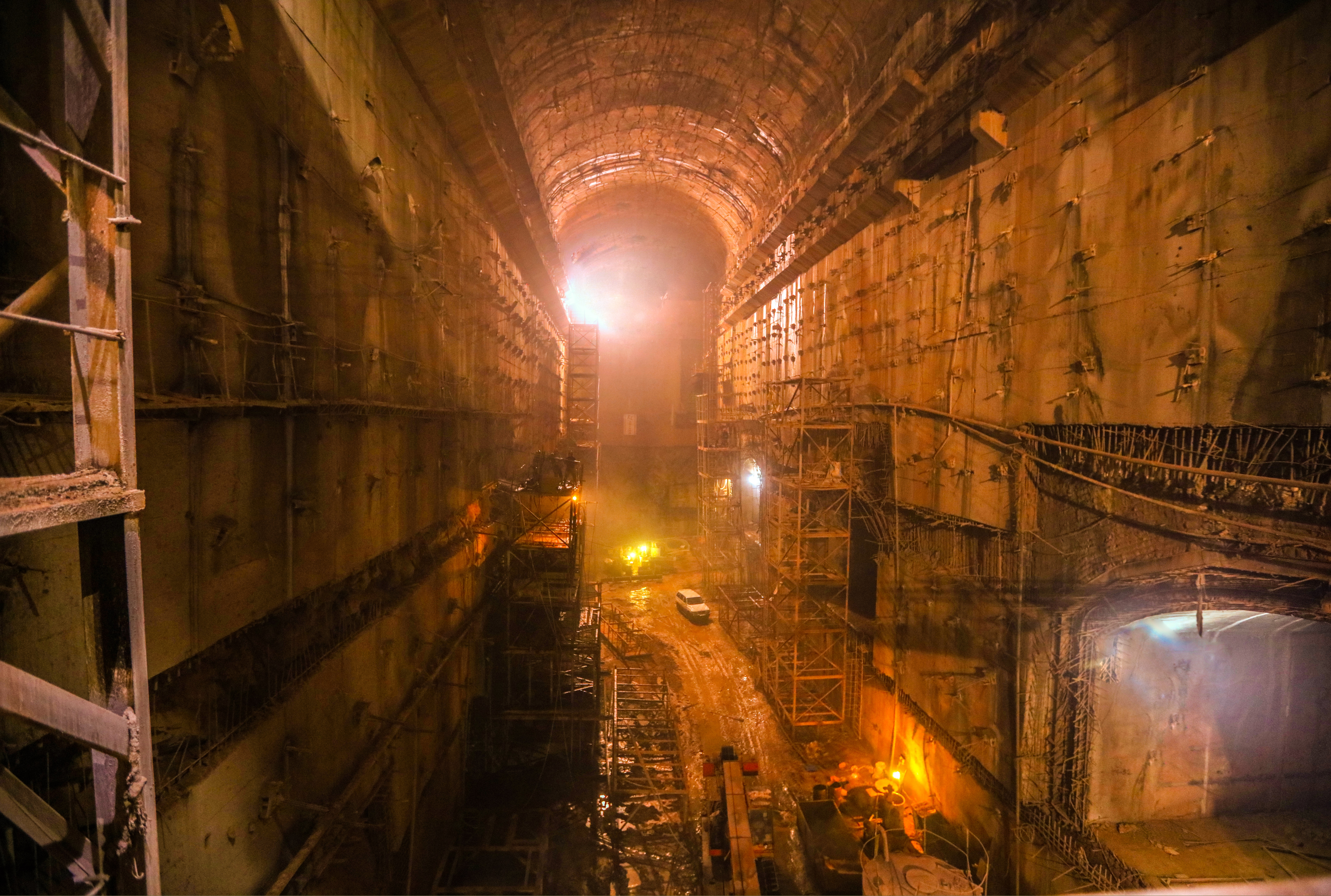
Cavern Construction

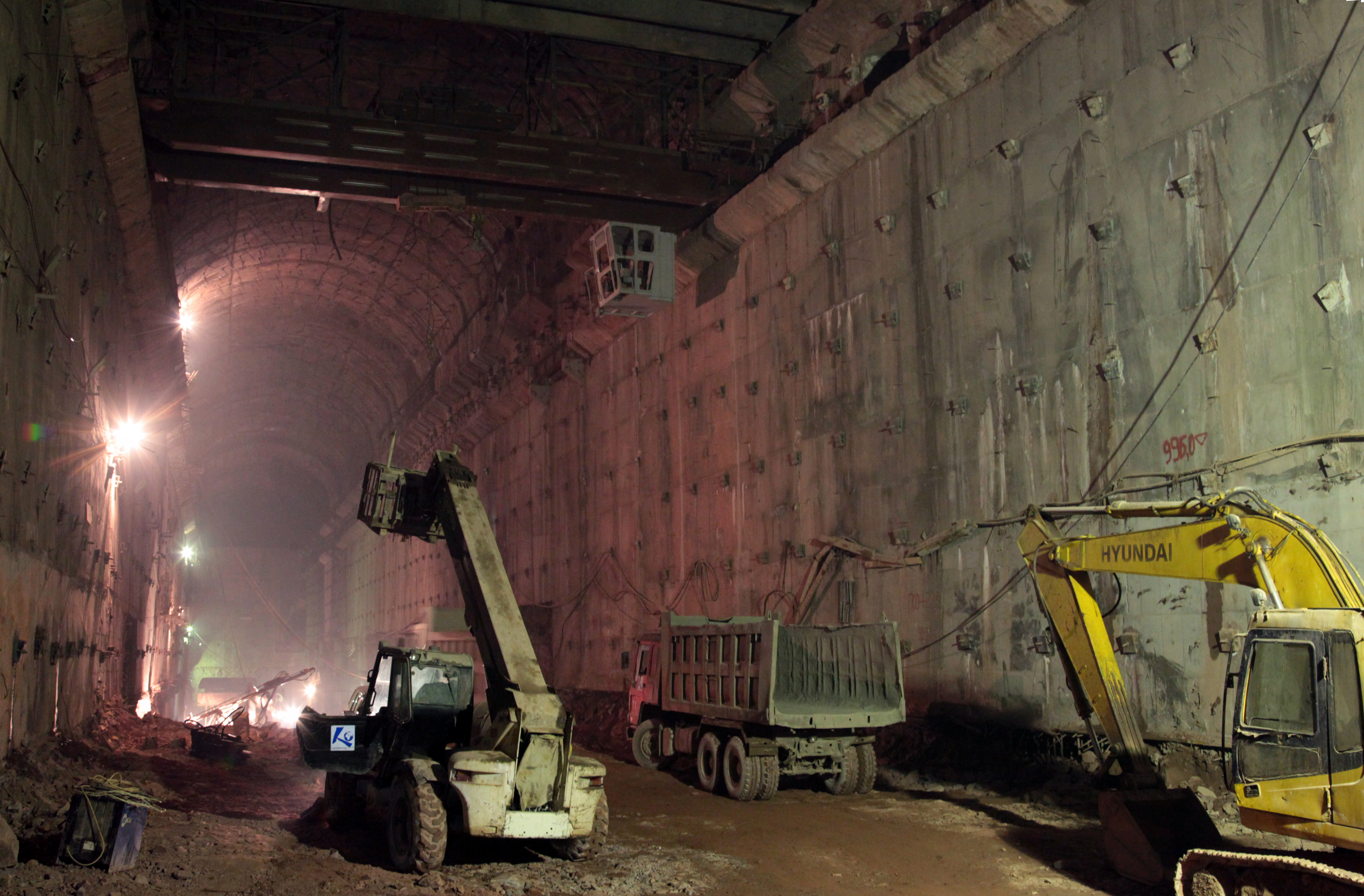
Construction of main caverns

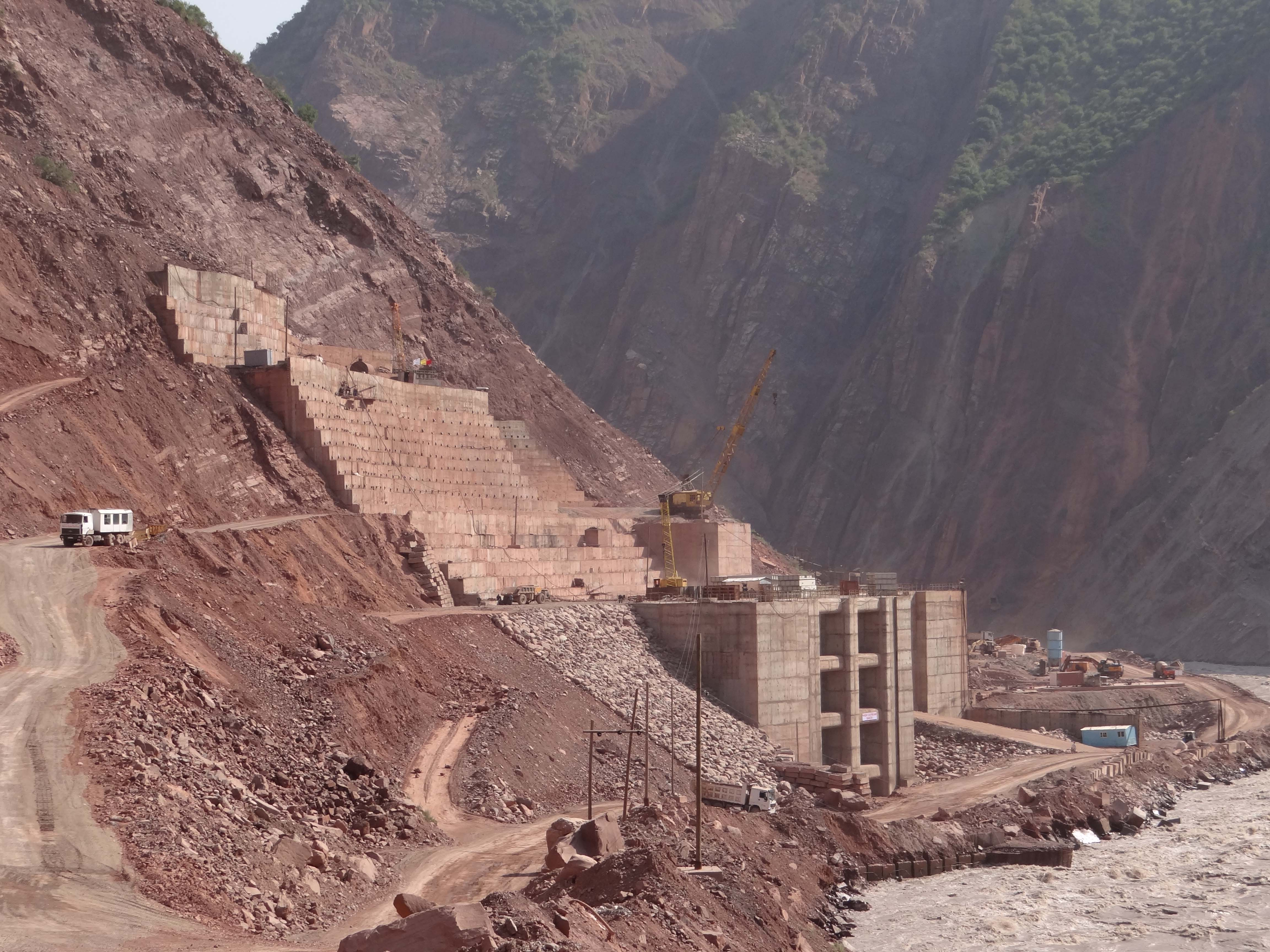
Water intake of Rogun Dam

== International tensions ==
The project has raised tensions with Uzbekistan over a decrease in the downstream water flow the country needs for its irrigated agriculture (particularly cotton). In February 2010, Uzbek Prime Minister Shavkat Mirziyoyev sent a letter to his Tajik counterpart demanding an independent examination of the possible consequences of the dam. During October 2010, Uzbek President Islam Karimov called the Rogun hydropower plants a "stupid project."

However, in 2018 Uzbekistan dropped its opposition to the Rogun Dam. "Go ahead and build it, but we hold to certain guarantees in accordance with these conventions that have been signed by you," Uzbek Foreign Minister Abdulaziz Komilov said in a televised appearance on July 5, 2018.

== Further information ==
- Fred Mills (19 November 2025). The World's Tallest Mega Dam Will Block Central Asia. The B1M. nv22uPAHgCw; Video on YouTube.
- Tim Gibson (18 November 2025). "Building the World's Tallest Megadam". The B1M.
