= Spitamen Bank =

Bank of Tajikistan

CJSC Spitamen Bank
- Native name: ҶСП Спитамен Бонк
- Formerly: Spitamen Capital
- Type: Private
- Industry: Banking
- Founded: 2008
- Headquarters: Dushanbe, Tajikistan
- Area served: Tajikistan
- Key people: Rakhmonov Rakhmatulloevich (Supervisory Board Chairman); Samandarzoda Nowrz (Board Chairman)
- Website: spitamenbank.tj

CJSC Spitamen Bank (Tajik: ҶСП “Спитамен Бонк”) is a Tajikistani bank that is licensed and regulated by the National Bank of Tajikistan. It is headquartered in Dushanbe, Tajikistan. As of 2026, it has 26 branches and over 70 banking service centres across the country. It is also the 7th largest bank in Tajikistan by assets, with total assets valued at TJS 2,943 million. The bank primarily focuses on retail and commercial banking services.

== History ==
=== Foundation ===
Spitamen Bank traces its origins to Spitamen Capital a microcredit deposit organisation which was established in 2008. A year later, the company established Spitamen Insurance to expand its services into the insurance sector. It subsequently broadened its operations and obtained a banking licence from the National Bank of Tajikistan in 2014, enabling it to conduct banking activities in both local and foreign currencies.

=== Since 2014 ===
In 2016, Spitamen Bank participated in a financial literacy initiative aimed at enhancing the financial knowledge and awareness of the population. The program was implemented with the support of the Swiss Government through SECO and the International Finance Corporation (IFC).

Since 2019, the bank has supported cross-border transfer services linking the national Korti Milli payment system with several Russian banks, including Alfa-Bank. The service enables customers to transfer funds between the two countries with no remittance fees.

However, in November 2025, during the Russo-Ukrainian conflict, the European Union (EU) imposed sanctions on Spitamen Bank. The sanctions were introduced under the EU's 19th package of sanctions against Russia and also targeted other Tajikistani banks, including Dushanbe City Bank and Commerce Bank of Tajikistan. The sanctions were related to concerns over alleged assistance in sanctions circumvention and support for the Russian economy. Subsequently, in April 2026, the three banks were removed from the sanctions list as part of the EU's 20th sanctions package, following the EU's assessment that the banks had cooperated in strengthening compliance measures and alignment with international anti-money laundering and regulatory standards.

== Corporate identity ==
The bank’s logo features two interconnected semicircles forming a continuous ring, symbolizing an unbroken and enduring business process. An upward pointing arrow represents the bank’s aspirations for growth and development, while the gold and silver colour palette reflects the branding of the bank. The name “Spitamen” is derived from Spitamenes, the ancient Sogdian leader who led an uprising in Sogdiana and Bactria against Alexander the Great.

== Awards ==
The bank has received numerous awards throughout its history of operation. However, the level of industry recognition associated with these awards varies, with some being regarded as vanity awards.

List of Awards
Year	Department	Name & Category	Issuing Organisation
2013	Spitamen Capital	Brand of the Year - Bronze Microfinance Category	Ministry of Economic Development and Trade
2017	Spitamen Bank	Brand of the Year - Best Bank Category	Ministry of Economic Development and Trade
2019	Spitamen Bank	Brand of the Year - Best Bank Category	Ministry of Economic Development and Trade
2022	Spitamen Insurance	Brand of the Year - Insurance Category	Ministry of Economic Development and Trade
2024	Spitamen Bank	Global Frontier Award	Boston Brand Research & Media

== Financial indicators ==
Credit Rating
Agency	Fitch Ratings	Moody's Investors Service	Standard & Poor's	MicroFinanza Rating	
Current Ratings	NR	NR	NR	BBB- Stable	Since 2020

== See also ==
- List of banks in Tajikistan
