= Science and technology in Tajikistan =

Science and technology in Tajikistan examines government efforts to develop a national innovation system and the impact of these policies.

== Socio-economic context ==
GDP growth trends in Central Asia, 2000−2013. Source: UNESCO Science Report: towards 2030 (2015), figure 14.1.

Tajikistan has the fastest-growing population in Central Asia (2.42% in 2014) and ranks lowest among the Central Asian republics on the Human Development Index (133rd in 2013). It also has the lowest GDP per capita in the region, although this rose from $1,788 to $2,512 (in current purchasing power parity dollars) between 2008 and 2013.

Tajikistan has recorded strong growth in recent years, thanks to various economic reforms, including the development of new sectors such as hydropower and tourism and effective measures to promote macro-economic stability. The country has considerable assets: in addition to freshwater and diverse mineral resources, including gold, it has relatively large expanses of undeveloped land suitable for agriculture and environmentally friendly crops, a relatively inexpensive labour force and occupies a strategic geographical position, thanks to its border with China, making it a place of transit for merchandise and transportation networks.

Although both exports and imports have grown impressively over the past decade, Tajikistan remains vulnerable to economic shocks, owing to its reliance on exports of raw materials, a restricted circle of trading partners and a negligible manufacturing capacity. The economy has encountered fluctuating global demand for cotton, aluminium and other metals (except gold) in recent years. Aluminium and raw cotton are its chief exports and the Tajik Aluminium Company is the country's primary industrial asset. In January 2014, the Minister of Agriculture announced the government's intention to reduce the land cultivated by cotton to make way for other crops.

GDP in Central Asia by economic sector, 2005 and 2013. Source: UNESCO Science Report: towards 2030, figure 14.2.

Like the other four Central Asian republics, Tajikistan is implementing structural reforms to improve competitiveness, as it gradually moves from a state-controlled economy to a market economy. In particular, the government has been striving to modernize the industrial sector and foster the development of service industries to reduce the share of agriculture in GDP. Between 2005 and 2013, however, the share of agriculture in the Tajik economy actually grew from 24% to 27% of GDP. Although the services sector expanded from 45% to 51% of GDP, the share of industry receded from 31% to 22% of GDP. Within the industry, the share of manufacturing halved to 11% of GDP.

In addition to widespread poverty, the country faces other challenges: the need to develop the rule of law; the high cost of combating drug trafficking and terrorism on its border; low Internet penetration (16% of the population in 2013) and a small domestic market. The government sector is not structured to meet the demands of a market economy and development plans and strategies are neither interconnected nor vertically integrated. Potential partners in the private sector and civil society are insufficiently implicated in the development process. To compound matters, the modest allocation of financial resources is frequently inadequate to reach the goals set forth in national strategic documents. The country is also plagued by inadequate statistics. These factors affect the implementation of the National Development Strategy for 2005−2015, which was designed by President Emomalii Rahmon to help the country meet the Millennium Development Goals.

== Education ==
In education, the National Development Strategy for 2005−2015 focuses on an institutional and economic reform of the education system and on boosting the education sector's potential to provide services. Key problems to overcome include widespread malnutrition and illness among children, leading to absenteeism; poorly qualified teaching staff; lowly paid teachers, which affects morale and encourages corruption; a shortage of up-to-date textbooks; ineffective evaluation methods; and inadequate curricula at all levels of education for meeting the demands of the modern world, including an absence of science-based curricula at some levels.

According to projections, the number of secondary school pupils could rise by 40% between 2005 and 2015. A recent survey revealed a lack of 600,000 places for schoolchildren, no heating or running water in one-quarter of schools and no toilets in 35%. Internet access is rare, even in schools equipped with computers, owing to frequent electricity cuts and a shortage of trained staff. In recent years, the gender gap in school attendance has increased for pupils in grades 9−11 particularly, in favour of boys.

Tajikistan has been increasing its investment in education since 2003. In 2014, the government invested 5.23% of GDP in education, up from 4.10% of GDP in 2008 and 2.77% of GDP in 2003. The share of GDP devoted to higher education has also progressed from 0.15% of GDP in 2003 to 0.49% of GDP in 2008 and 0.52% of GDP in 2014. Government spending on education nevertheless remains well beneath 1991 levels (8.9% of GDP) when Tajikistan was still part of the Soviet Union.

In order to compensate for the funding shortfall and satisfy urgent needs, the education system is becoming increasingly dependent on ‘unofficial payments’ and international aid. Moreover, administrative barriers hamper the establishment of effective public−private partnerships, limiting private sector participation at pre-school and vocational and university levels, in particular. It seems unlikely that Tajikistan will reach the target ensconced in its National Development Strategy of privatizing 30% of these institutions by 2015.

Other targets to 2015 include providing all pupils with adequate textbooks, involving local communities more in problem-solving, decentralizing education funding, retraining 25% of teachers annually and founding at least 450 new schools, all of which are to be equipped with heating, water and sanitation, along with the renovated schools. At least 50% of schools are also to be given access to the internet.

== Policy issues in science and technology ==
=== Research relevance ===
Tajikistan can still count on a fairly strong core of human resources in science but the meagre resources available for research and development are spread too thinly across a wide range of areas. In addition, research is disconnected from problem-solving and market needs. Research institutions also have weak linkages to educational institutions, making it hard to share facilities such as laboratories. The poor distribution of information and communication technologies also hampers international scientific co-operation and information-sharing.

Conscious of these problems, the government intends to reform the science sector. In 2015, there were plans to conduct an inventory and analysis of research topics at scientific institutions in order to enhance their relevance. Targeted programmes are to be adopted for basic and applied research in critical areas for scientific and economic development, and at least 50% of scientific projects will have some practical application. Scientists are being encouraged to apply for competitive grants proposed by the government and international organizations and foundations, and contract research will be gradually introduced for high-priority research in all the sciences. Related scientific facilities will be renovated and equipped, including with internet access. A scientific information database is also being set up.

Tajikistan hosted its first forum of inventors in October 2014 in Dushanbe, entitled From Invention to Innovation. Run by the National Centre for Patents and Information of the Ministry of Economic Development and Trade, in partnership with international organizations, the forum discussed the private sector's needs and fostered international ties.

=== Gender issues ===
Although policies are in place to give women equal rights and opportunities, these policies are underfunded and poorly understood by public employees at all levels of government. There is also little co-operation among the state, civil society and the business world when it comes to implementing the national gender policy. As a result, women often find themselves excluded from public life and decision-making processes, even though they are increasingly a household breadwinner.As part of current administrative reform within the National Development Strategy, gender considerations are to be taken into account in the drafting of future budgets. Existing legislation will be amended to support gender equality objectives and ensure equal access for men and women to secondary and higher education, loans, information, consulting services and, in the case of entrepreneurs, to venture capital and other resources. The policy will also focus on eliminating gender stereotypes in the public consciousness and preventing violence against women.

=== Policy issues, 2015–2019 ===
==== Empowering the private sector ====
Tajikistan has been promoting the emergence of micro-enterprises and SMEs by making it easier for entrepreneurs to access finance, especially for returning migrants, and by promoting exports in the agribusiness sector. These reforms would seem to have worked, since 300 such businesses opened in 2016–2017. According to the OECD, the country has made ‘visible progress’ on the demand side, running training programmes for returning migrants and supporting financial literacy. On the supply side, though, moves to facilitate the banking of remittances and introduce public support funds have been delayed by external and internal shocks.

Deeper reforms are needed to empower the private sector. A literature review conducted by the Institute of Development Studies found that many of the challenges faced by the private sector in Tajikistan 'have their root in weak governance', particularly in the financial sector, in state-owned enterprises and business-related divisions of the public administration. The fiscal system was also in urgent need of reform.

==== Research activity ====
According to Mamadsho Ilolov, President of the Academy of Sciences, some public–private and non-governmental initiatives have emerged but traditional structures remain dominant. The Academy of Sciences is the epicentre for science in the country; it organizes research activity across smaller institutes and implements related legislation.

As of 2014, 100 institutions were involved in R&D. They employed 18 000 general staff and 20 756 researchers, according to national statistics. Three main mechanisms regulate the distribution of funding: core funding goes to institutes and centres to support research infrastructure; targeted funding supports large-scale research involving industry and SMEs; and thematic funding offers competitive grants for research projects by topic.

==== National Development Plan ====
Science remains a priority for the National Development Strategy to 2030 (2016), which divides implementation into three five-year phases. Its main goals are to ensure energy security, develop connectivity in terms of telecommunications and transportation, guarantee food security and expand productive employment.

The strategy has broad ambitions. At the level of economic reform, it favours export promotion, import substitution and investment, to be accomplished by empowering the public administration, removing barriers to private enterprise, legally protecting property rights and improving vocational training. These reforms are expected to drive an average economic growth rate of 6–7% per year, nearly halving poverty to 15% of the population by 2030.

Trends in research expenditure in Central Asia, as a percentage of GDP, 2001−2013. Source: UNESCO Science Report: 2030 (2015), figure 14.3.

== Research trends ==
=== Financial investment ===
Central Asian researchers by sector of employment (HC), 2013. Source: UNESCO Science Report: towards 2030 (2015), figure 14.5.

Domestic spending on research and development increased by 157% between 2007 and 2013 (to PPP$20.9 million, in constant 2005 PPP$) but this barely pushed up Tajikistan's research intensity, which rose only from 0.07% to 0.12% of GDP over the same period. It is harder to improve the ratio of research spending to GDP when economic growth is strong: Tajikistan's economy grew by more than 6% a year for most of the period between 2007 and 2013.

In 2018, Tajikistan devoted 0.1% of GDP to research and development.

=== Human resources ===
Tajikistan counted 262 researchers (in head counts) per million inhabitants in 2013, compared to a world average of 1,083 per million inhabitants (in full-time equivalents). Researchers were fairly evenly spread among the different fields of science but gravitated most towards natural sciences (24% of all researchers) and agricultural sciences (22%). Researchers were either employed by the government (70%) or by the higher education sector (30%), suggesting that industrial research is non-existent.

In 2018, Tajikistan counted 292 researchers per million inhabitants (in head counts).

Among university graduates, Tajikistan had a similar ratio of PhD graduates in science (3.9 per million population) in 2012 to Kazakhstan (4.4 per million).

Kazakhstan, Uzbekistan and Kyrgyzstan have all maintained a share of women researchers above 40% since the fall of the Soviet Union but only one in three Tajik scientists (34%) was a woman in 2013, down from 40% in 2002. Women accounted for 11% of PhDs in science in 2012, the lowest ratio in Central Asia. Data are unavailable for engineering.

Central Asian researchers by field of science, 2013. Source: UNESCO Science Report: towards 2030 (2015), figure 14.4.

Table: PhDs obtained in science and engineering in Central Asia, 2013 or closest year

| | PhDs | | PhDs in science | | | | PhDs in engineering | | | |
| | Total | Women (%) | Total | Women (% | Total per million population | Women PhDs per million population | Total | Women (% | Total per million population | Women PhDs per million population |
| Kazakhstan (2013) | 247 | 51 | 73 | 60 | 4.4 | 2.7 | 37 | 38 | 2.3 | 0.9 |
| Kyrgyzstan (2012) | 499 | 63 | 91 | 63 | 16.6 | 10.4 | 54 | 63 | – | – |
| Tajikistan (2012) | 331 | 11 | 31 | – | 3.9 | – | 14 | – | – | – |
| Uzbekistan (2011) | 838 | 42 | 152 | 30 | 5.4 | 1.6 | 118 | 27.0 | – | – |

Source: UNESCO Science Report: towards 2030 (2015), Table 14.1

Note: PhD graduates in science cover life sciences, physical sciences, mathematics and statistics, and computing; PhDs in engineering also cover manufacturing and construction. For Central Asia, the generic term of PhD also encompasses Candidate of Science and Doctor of Science degrees. Data are unavailable for Turkmenistan.

Table: Central Asian researchers by field of science and gender, 2013 or closest year

| | | Total researchers (head counts) | | | Researchers by field of science (head counts) | | | | | | | | | | | |
| | | Total researchers (head counts) | | | Natural Sciences | | Engineering and technology | | Medical and health sciences | | Agricultural sciences | | Social sciences | | Humanities | |
| | Total researchers | Per million pop. | Number of women | Women (% | Total | Women (% | Total | Women (%) | Total | Women (%) | Total | Women (%) | Total | Women (%) | Total | Women (%) |
| Kazakhstan 2013 | 17 195 | 1 046 | 8 849 | 51.5 | 5 091 | 51.9 | 4 996 | 44.7 | 1 068 | 69.5 | 2 150 | 43.4 | 1 776 | 61.0 | 2 114 | 57.5 |
| Kyrgyzstan 2011 | 2 224 | 412 | 961 | 43.2 | 593 | 46.5 | 567 | 30.0 | 393 | 44.0 | 212 | 50.0 | 154 | 42.9 | 259 | 52.1 |
| Tajikistan 2013 | 2 152 | 262 | 728 | 33.8 | 509 | 30.3 | 206 | 18.0 | 374 | 67.6 | 472 | 23.5 | 335 | 25.7 | 256 | 34.0 |
| Uzbekistan 2011 | 30 890 | 1 097 | 12 639 | 40.9 | 6 910 | 35.3 | 4 982 | 30.1 | 3 659 | 53.6 | 1 872 | 24.8 | 6 817 | 41.2 | 6 650 | 52.0 |

Source: UNESCO Science Report: towards 2030 (2015), Table 14.1. Data are unavailable for Turkmenistan.

Scientific publications from Central Asia catalogued by Thomson Reuters' Web of Science, Science Citation Index Expanded, 2005–2014, UNESCO Science Report: towards 2030 (2015), figure 14.6.

=== Research output ===
Tajik scientific output remains low. Tajik scientists published 32 articles in internationally calatogued journals in 2005 and 46 in 2014. This corresponds to five articles per million inhabitants in 2014. For the purposes of comparison, the global average in 2013 was 176 per million and the average for sub-Saharan Africa was 20 per million. Kazakhstan published 36 articles per million inhabitants in 2014. Language may play a role in the low count of Central Asian articles in international journals, as the Thomson Reuters' database tends to favour articles written in English.

Between 2008 and 2014, the three main partners of Tajik scientists were based in Pakistan (99 co-authored articles), the Russian Federation (58), United States of America (44), Germany (26) and United Kingdom (20), according to Thomson Reuters' Web of Science.

Between 2008 and 2013, no Kyrgyz, Tajik or Turkmen patents were registered at the US Patent and Trademark Office, compared to five for Kazakh inventors and three for Uzbek inventors.

Tajikistan was ranked 108th in the Global Innovation Index in 2025.

== International co-operation ==
Cumulative total of articles by Central Asians between 2008 and 2013, by field of science. Source: UNESCO Science Report: towards 2030 (2015), figure 14.6.

Like the other four Central Asian republics, Tajikistan is a member of several international bodies, including the Organization for Security and Co-operation in Europe, the Economic Cooperation Organization and the Shanghai Cooperation Organisation. Tajikistan and the other four republics are also members of the Central Asia Regional Economic Cooperation (CAREC) Programme, which also includes Afghanistan, Azerbaijan, China, Mongolia and Pakistan. In November 2011, the 10 member countries adopted the CAREC 2020 Strategy, a blueprint for furthering regional co-operation. Over the decade to 2020, US$50 billion is being invested in priority projects in transport, trade and energy to improve members’ competitiveness. The landlocked Central Asian republics are conscious of the need to co-operate in order to maintain and develop their transport networks and energy, communication and irrigation systems.

Tajikistan has been involved in a project launched by the European Union in September 2013, IncoNet CA. The aim of this project is to encourage Central Asian countries to participate in research projects within Horizon 2020, the European Union's eighth research and innovation funding programme. The focus of this research projects is on three societal challenges considered as being of mutual interest to both the European Union and Central Asia, namely climate change, energy and health. IncoNet CA builds on the experience of earlier projects which involved other regions, such as Eastern Europe, the South Caucasus and the Western Balkans. IncoNet CA focuses on twinning research facilities in Central Asia and Europe. It involves a consortium of partner institutions from Austria, the Czech Republic, Estonia, Germany, Hungary, Kazakhstan, Kyrgyzstan, Poland, Portugal, Tajikistan, Turkey and Uzbekistan. In May 2014, the European Union launched a 24-month call for project applications from twinned institutions – universities, companies and research institutes – for funding of up to €10,000 to enable them to visit one another's facilities to discuss project ideas or prepare joint events like workshops.

The International Science and Technology Center (ISTC) was established in 1992 by the European Union, Japan, the Russian Federation and the US to engage weapons scientists in civilian research projects and to foster technology transfer. ISTC branches have been set up in the following countries party to the agreement: Armenia, Belarus, Georgia, Kazakhstan, Kyrgyzstan and Tajikistan. The headquarters of ISTC were moved to Nazarbayev University in Kazakhstan in June 2014, three years after the Russian Federation announced its withdrawal from the centre.

Tajikistan has been a member of the World Trade Organization since 2013.

== See also ==
- Bibliography of Tajikistan

== Sources ==
This article incorporates text from a free content work. Licensed under CC-BY-SA IGO 3.0. Text taken from UNESCO Science Report: towards 2030, 365-377, UNESCO, UNESCO Publishing.

This article incorporates text from a free content work. Licensed under CC BY-SA 3.0 IGO Text taken from UNESCO Science Report: the Race Against Time for Smarter Development, UNESCO, UNESCO publishing. To learn how to add open license text to Wikipedia articles, please see this how-to page. For information on reusing text from Wikipedia, please see the terms of use.
