= Bank Eskhata =

Bank of Tajikistan

- Native name: ҶСК Бонки Эсхата
- Formerly: Eskhata Commercial Bank
- Type: Public
- Industry: Banking
- Founded: November 16, 1993; 32 years ago
- Headquarters: Khujand, Tajikistan
- Key people: Rainer Müller-Hanke, Chairman of the Supervisory Board; Akmaljon Sayfidinov, Chairman of the Board
- Operating income: TJS 1,117 million (2025)
- Number of employees: 2617 (2025)
- Subsidiaries: Eskhata Leasing, Eskhata Leasing (Uzbekistan)
- Website: www.eskhata.com

OJSC Eskhata Bank (Tajik: ҶСК "Бонки Эсхата") is an open joint-stock Tajikistani bank that is licensed and regulated by the National Bank of Tajikistan. It is headquartered in Khujand, Tajikistan. As of December 2025, it has 32 branches and 105 banking service centres across the country. It is also the 2nd largest bank in Tajikistan by assets, with total assets valued at TJS 8,485 million. The bank primarily focuses on retail and commercial banking services.

== History ==
=== Foundation ===
Established on 16 November 1993 as OJSC Eskhata Bank, the bank was reconstituted as JSC Eskhata Commercial Bank on 28 May 1999, before being re-registered as OJSC Eskhata Bank on 12 September 2002.

=== Since 2002 ===
In 2009, Zulfiqor Azizov, a former director of a local Eskhata Bank branch in Chkalovsk embezzled funds from the bank and its clients, before fleeing to Russia. The bank subsequently repaid US$200,000 to 39 depositors who had valid transaction records with the bank.

In 2018, the bank's CEO, Khurshed Nosirov, was suspended, while at least 10 other employees were dismissed. The bank was also fined TJS 3.6 million. The measures were linked to purported systemic deficiencies in the bank's controls relating to money laundering and terrorism financing, although critics have attributed the actions to political interference in the banking sector.

In 2026, the European Bank for Reconstruction and Development (EBRD) provided the bank with US$15 million in financing, comprising up to US$12 million under its Youth in Business programme and US$3 million under the Central Asian Women in Business Programme. This followed an earlier EBRD equity investment in December 2005, which helped the bank meet the National Bank of Tajikistan’s revised US$5 million minimum capital requirement.

Eskhata Bank does not operate Russia's Mir payment system. It was consequently not among the three Tajikistani banks subjected to European Union (EU) sanctions in connection with the Russo-Ukrainian conflict over alleged assistance in sanctions circumvention and support for the Russian economy.

== Operations ==
Bank Eskhata operates two wholly owned subsidiaries that are engaged in leasing services. Eskhata Leasing LLC was registered on 25 December 2018, while Eskhata Leasing (Uzbekistan) LLC was registered in May 2025.

== Financial indicators ==
Credit Rating
Agency	Fitch Ratings	Moody's Ratings		Standard & Poor's
Current Ratings	NR	B2/stable	Since Mar 2026	NR

== See also ==
- List of banks in Tajikistan
