= Sarikamysh gas field =

Natural gas field in Sughd Region, Tajikistan

Sarikamysh
- Country: Tajikistan
- Region: Sughd Province
- Offshore/onshore: onshore
- Operator: Gazprom

Field history
- Discovery: 2010
- Start of production: 2012

Production
- Current production of gas: 5.5×10^{6} m^{3}/d 192.5×10^{6} cu ft/d 2×10^{9} m^{3}/a (71×10^{9} cu ft/a)
- Estimated gas in place: 60×10^{9} m^{3} 2.1×10^{12} cu ft

The Sarikamysh gas field is a natural gas field located in the Sughd Region of Tajikistan. It was discovered in 2010 and developed by and Gazprom. It began production in 2012 and produces natural gas and condensates. The total proven reserves of the Sarikamysh gas field are around 2.1 trillion cubic feet (60 billion m^{3}), and production is slated to be around 192.5 million cubic feet/day (550,000 m^{3}).
