= Alif Bank =

Bank and fintech company in Tajikistan

Alif Bank OJSC
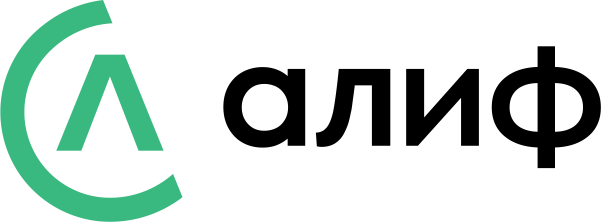
- Native name: ҶСК «Алиф Бонк»
- Formerly: MDO Alif Capital / Alif Sarmoya
- Type: Open joint-stock company
- Industry: Financial services
- Founded: 2014; 12 years ago
- Headquarters: Dushanbe, Tajikistan
- Number of locations: 3 branches and 14 service centers
- Key people: Firdavs Mirzoev (Chairman of the Supervisory Board, co-founder); Gulanor Atobek (Chairman); Abdullo Kurbanov (Co-founder); Zuhursho Rahmatulloev (Co-founder)
- Products: corporate banking; car loan; credit cards; fintech products; marketplace
- Total equity: 257,300,000 somoni (31.12.2025)
- Number of employees: 1,000 (2026)
- Parent: Alif Capital Holdings Limited
- Website: alif.tj

Alif Bank (full name Alif Bank Open Joint Stock Company, Tajik: Ҷамъияти саҳомии кушодаи «Алиф Бонк»; former name MDO Alif Capital) is a commercial bank and fintech company in Tajikistan. The bank is headquartered in Dushanbe and has three branches and 14 service centers in various cities of Tajikistan.

== History ==
After several years of studying and working abroad, Abdullo Kurbanov, Zuhursho Rahmatulloev, and Firdavs Mirzoev founded Alif in Tajikistan in 2014. According to the company's website, it initially started with three people, offering microloans to the public, and later expanded its workforce significantly.

On 19 December 2019, MDO Alif Capital LLC was transformed into Alif Bank OJSC. Then, by decision of the Board of the National Bank of Tajikistan dated 3 January 2020, under No. 1, Alif Bank OJSC was granted a License to conduct banking operations in national and foreign currencies.

== Timeline ==
=== 2014 ===
- April 29 — Alif Capital was founded by three co-founders and signed a car loan agreement with its first client.

=== 2015 ===
- October 7 — The first Customer Relationship Management (CRM) software was designed, which was later launched in 2016.
- During its nine months of operation, Alif tripled its loan portfolio and became the fifth-largest microcredit organization among members of AFOT (Association of Finance Organizations of Tajikistan).

=== 2016 ===
- March 14 — Alif Capital was granted a banking license, which enabled it to open savings accounts and carry out financial transactions both domestically and internationally.
- April 1 — The first savings account was opened.

=== 2017 ===
- January 1 — Alif launched its core banking system, developed by its in-house programming team. Writing and launching its own core banking system allowed Alif to take an important step toward becoming a financial and technology company.
- March 17 — Joined the National Payment System Korti milli and began issuing its payment cards.
- June 3 — Alif Shop, one of the first marketplaces in Tajikistan offering purchases by installments, was launched.
- August 1 — Alif Academy was established, offering free programming courses to promote IT development in Tajikistan.
- October 16 — Alif Capital opened its first banking service center in Khujand.
- November 4 — Alif launched its first online acquiring platform, Alif Pay, enabling Korti milli cardholders to make online payments.

=== 2018 ===
- January 6 — Alif Mobi, a mobile wallet, was launched.
- January 29 — Alif Capital joined the international money transfer system.
- March 15 — The company introduced an overdraft card with a 10-day installment feature for its clients.
- August 20 — Alif launched the Salom installment card, which allows customers to purchase goods and services online and offline.
- October 26 — Alif Online's website was developed with a personal account feature for tracking operations and services used.

=== 2019 ===
- November 13 — Khofiz Shakhidi acquired 25% of Alif Bank's shares and became the chairman of the supervisory board.

=== 2020 ===
- January 3 — Alif Capital received a banking license under No. 0000114 from the National Bank of Tajikistan and became Alif Bank.
- June — The Italian rating agency MicroFinanza Rating confirmed Alif Bank's operational capacity and assigned it a BBB/Stable financial rating.
- July 7 — Alif Bank and Visa became strategic partners to develop the digital payment ecosystem in Tajikistan.

=== 2021 ===
- August 13 — Alif Business Internet banking passed an information security test (pentest) from the Swiss company ImmuniWeb.

=== 2022 ===
- November 2 — Gulanor Atobek was appointed as the new Chairman of Alif Bank.

=== 2023 ===
- July–August — Following a comprehensive analysis and assessment, the international rating agency MicroFinanza Rating (Italy) assigned Alif an organizational rating of α- "Medium".
- Alif received three licenses for operations in the securities market, thereby broadening its range of services.
- Alif Bank established investment agreements with Mashreq Bank (UAE) and Aktif Bank (Türkiye).

=== 2024 ===
- Alif Mobi passed cybersecurity tests by the international company Snapsec (UK), reaffirming Alif's commitment to digital security.
- Alif Bank and Mastercard signed an agreement to expand cashless payments in Tajikistan, launching Mastercard issuance.
- Alif Bank celebrated its 10th anniversary, reflecting on a decade of achievements and growth.
- Alif Bank and Visa introduced Google Pay services in Tajikistan for the first time, advancing digital payment options.

=== 2025 ===
- In July 2025, Alif Bank launched Visa Direct to Account — commercial payments and transfers without commission.
- In August 2025, the Alif app began offering transfers to China via Alipay and WeChat without commission or double conversion.
- In September 2025, a new currency exchange service became available in the Alif app, allowing users to exchange U.S. dollars, euros, and Russian rubles without visiting a bank.

== Activities ==
Alif Bank's service centers are located in a number of cities and districts of Tajikistan: Istaravshan, Buston, Jabbor Rasulov, Bobojon Ghafurov, Kanibadam, Isfara, Panjakent, Spitamen, Bokhtar, Kulob, Danghara, Yovon, Vose, Jaloliddini Balkhi, Hisor, Vahdat, Tursunzoda, and Rudaki.

== Holding structure ==
Alif Capital Holdings Limited is the holding company and principal shareholder of Alif Bank, with its head office located in the United Kingdom.

As of 31 December 2025, the paid-up authorized capital of Alif Bank OJSC amounted to 257,300,000 somoni.

== Management ==
- The Chairman of Alif Bank is Gulanor Atobek.
- Deputy Chairmen — Akbardzhon Mamadzhonov, Khushvaktmurod Sharifov.

== Shareholders ==
The sole shareholder of Alif Bank OJSC is Alif Capital Holdings Limited, a legal entity established under the laws of the United Kingdom. As of 31 December 2025, the paid-up authorized capital of Alif Bank OJSC amounted to 257,300,000 somoni.

== Owners ==
According to the Alif Capital Holdings Limited website, the company's co-founders and supervisors are Abdullo Kurbanov, Zuhursho Rahmatulloev, and Firdavs Mirzoev; Khofiz Shakhidi, Firdavs Shakhidi, Rajabbek Sulaymonbekov, and Nasim Alibhai are registered as supervisors.

== Banking products ==
As a growing financial company, Alif offers various projects to the public in the areas of finance, technology, and education:

- Alif Shop — an online store for purchasing by installment or cash. One of the first marketplaces in the Republic of Tajikistan, uniting stores in the capital and regional districts.
- Alif Business — an Internet bank where corporate clients can carry out banking operations directly from their phone or computer. Alif Business also supports international commercial payments via Visa Direct to Wallet and Visa Direct to Account.
- Salom card — Alif Bank's installment card, enabling purchases in installments throughout Tajikistan.
- Alif app (formerly Alif Mobi) — a mobile wallet used in Tajikistan and Uzbekistan. With this app, customers can pay for utilities and other services, transfer money, make purchases via QR code, and manage their funds online.
- Alif Pay — an online payment system using Korti milli cards from all banks in Tajikistan.

== Issues ==
On 20 June 2020, the National Bank of Tajikistan imposed a fine of 500,000 somoni on Alif Bank due to shortcomings in its personnel policy. Abdullo Kurbanov emphasized the bank's "transparency in operations" and its "responsibility to society".

In 2021, the Tax Committee under the Government of the Republic of Tajikistan demanded additional tax payments from Alif Bank amounting to approximately 1.6 million somoni (including fines) for the year 2019. As a result of legal proceedings, the bank was required to pay the specified amount.

== Awards and Recognitions ==
=== 2019 ===
- Certificate of Honor from the Tax Committee under the Government of the Republic of Tajikistan for the honest fulfillment of tax legislation and a significant contribution to the revenue side of the state budget.
- Gold prize "Brand of the Year — 2019" in the nomination "Peak of Glory".

=== 2020 ===
- Winner in the categories Fastest Growing Retail Bank in Tajikistan 2020 and Best Digital Wallet 2020 by Global Banking & Finance.

=== 2021 ===
- Alif Bank received the ICD's Global Finnovation Award 2020 for its Alif Mobi app and Salom installment card at the annual meeting of the Islamic Development Bank Group.

=== 2022 ===
- Award from the international payment system Visa — "Promotion of Visa Infinite and Platinum in the Republic of Tajikistan".
- Received the GENStarters Award 2022 at the annual Global Entrepreneurship Network award event in Riyadh, Saudi Arabia.

=== 2023 ===
- Alif Shop became the only marketplace from the CIS to be included in the top 100 of EWC 2022 out of 30,000 startups.
- The Golden Award "Brand of the Year — 2022" in the nomination Banking Financial Organizations; a silver award for the Alif Shop online store and a bronze award for Alif Academy.
- First place in the competition "Best Financial Credit Organization for Serving Women Entrepreneurs 2022" in the nomination "Opening and Maintaining a Bank Account".

=== 2024 ===
- Winner of Global Islamic Finance Awards 2024 in the category Islamic Debit Card Of The Year by The Digital Banker.
- Alif Bank received the Tajikistan National Digital Commerce Award in the categories Best Fintech Project and Best Marketplace.

=== 2025 ===
- Alif Bank took first place in the competition "Best Financial and Credit Organization for Serving Women Entrepreneurs" in the nomination "Installation and Use of Electronic Payment Tools".
- Alif Bank received three awards from Mastercard: "Sustainable Development Leader", "Creative Marketing Campaign 2025", and "Successful Mastercard Send Initiative 2025".
- Alif Bank received four gold awards at the national "Brand of the Year 2025" competition in the categories "Financial Organization", "Modern Technologies", and "Culture and Education".
- Alif Bank received eight awards from Visa: "Best Visa Direct Acquirer", "Best Issuer of Visa Commercial Cards", "Best Card Issuer in the Domestic Market", "Google Pay Advertising Campaign", "Launch and Promotion of the VDA/W Solution", "Implementation of Visa Risk Manager", "ALM Implementation", and "Cyber Source Integration in Visa".

=== 2026 ===
- In March 2026, Alif Bank received the international PCI DSS version 4.0.1 certificate from the independent company Compliance Control Ltd (Tallinn, Estonia).
