= Tajikistan and the World Bank =

Tajikistan did not join in the World Bank until 1993. Before the collapse of USSR in 1991, Tajikistan was experiencing planned economy which was dominated by Moscow. Right after the dissolution, different from other nations which experienced a relatively stable transition from planned economy to market economy, Tajikistan fell into a serious civil war. As a result, the first mission after Tajikistan became the official member of the World Bank, was to recover its economy from bullets and blood. In 1997. $10 million credit was grant for Post-Conflict Rehabilitation Project. The proposed credit was used to conduct necessary imports and to restore production. Under different time periods, the World Bank and Tajikistan worked together in response to various problems. Later on, the economic crisis of 2008 caused the inflation of food prices in Tajikistan. In response to the crisis, the World Bank issued $6.25 million for the Emergency Food Security and Seed Imports Project in order to help at least 28000 households to release the food price pressure. Coming into the 21st century, Tajikistan received financing from IDA and IBRD of the World Bank with respect to programs of healthcare, education, irrigation and agriculture. Over the past years, Tajikistan has received over 130 projects of which 17 are active and a total of over $1.4 billion from the World Bank. With the help of those projects, from 2000 to 2017, the poverty rate in Tajikistan had been decreased from 83% to 29.5%. Besides, current GDP growth rate in Tajikistan is around 7%. Nevertheless, with a stable GDP growth rate, Tajikistan is still one of the poorest countries in Central Asia.

== Voting power ==
Tajikistan due to its low economic development, does not hold very strong voting power in the World Bank. Belonging to the constituency led by Switzerland, Tajikistan has 53918 votes which contributes to only 0.19 percent of voting power in IDA

== International finance cooperation ==
IFC, one of the sub-organization of the World Bank Group, is mainly responsible for funding projects in developing economies with respect to private sectors. Tajikistan joined the IFC in 1994, one year after it became the member of the World Bank. Starting from 1997, $133 million has been allocated from IFC to fund 40 projects in Tajikistan in private sector. Apart from direct financing support, IFC also builds cooperative relationship with local organizations. Ever since 2008, IFC has already started to provide fund for IMON International, the largest microcredit institution in Tajikistan. In 2015, IFC helped to collect a total of $16.5 million with $5 million from itself again for IMON International in order to boost Tajikistan's domestic private sectors. In 2016, IMON International and the World Bank formed partnership in one of the World Bank Project - Agriculture Commercialization Project, providing advisory support and financing for small business and newly agriculture enterprises.

== Development of agriculture industry ==
According to the World Bank report of Tajikistan in 2017, 21% of total annual GDP and 45% of total employment could be attributed to agriculture sector. In order to better exploit the potential of this industry, the World Bank had come up with multiple projects. Second Tajikistan Public Employment for Sustainable Agriculture and Water Resources Management Project with $18 million from IDA helped approximately 43000 rural households in southern Khatlon region of Tajikistan in terms of higher crop production in 2013. In 2014, the World Bank approved another $22 million for the Agriculture Commercialization Program which allocated $6.7 million to provide with technical support for produce marketing, $15.32 million to small business financing funds and $3.9 million to institutional reform. Up until now, 80 technical advisors had already been trained and over 16000 farmers had received fund or advisory help from the World Bank.

== NDS2030 ==
The National Development Strategy of the Republic of Tajikistan - 2030 (NDS 2030) is the development goal proposed by current government up until 2030. NDS 2030 claims to increase domestic incomes by up to 3.5% times and decrease current poverty rate by 50% in 2030 i. In order to better help with this development goal, the World Bank suggests that NDS should transform its growth model giving more space for private investment. Besides, it is also necessary to reform the banking sector and promote a more fair and transparent business environment. In addition, Tajikistan and the World Bank Group also work together under the new Country Partnership Framework for 2019 - 2023 as part of the steps for realizing NDS 2030. In this partnership strategy, the World Bank states that it will work with Tajikistan in terms of labor market improvement, job creation, private sector development, human capital cultivation and environment protection.

== Recent History ==
Post the collapse of the Soviet Union, Tajikistan received $1.4 billion investment from the World Bank to improve people's lives and reduce poverty. Over the past decades, the partnership with the World Bank has helped Tajikistan to evolve in line with changes in the global economy and local needs. Initially, the World Bank only helped the country in the reconstruction process after the civil war and provided funding in response to natural disasters and food security. At the beginning of 2000, the World Bank started making investments in Tajikistan to create job opportunities through better access to healthcare, safe drinking water, improved education, diversification of agriculture, improved business environment, enhanced land rights, and restore productivity led growth.

After the economic shock between 2008 and 2014, which affected Tajikistan through lower prices for export commodities and reduced remittances, The World Bank invested in the country to promote income generation opportunities and protecting the poorest households in the rural regions. The World Bank subsequently provided funding to Tajikistan to support the reforms of the second generations in energy, education, agriculture, and health, to improve the quality of services accessed by the population. During the same period, the World Bank worked together with the private sectors, development partners, civil society, and the government of Tajikistan to promote private investment to increase job opportunities, improve the business environment and establish a condition for sustainable economic growth of the country. The World Bank currently aims to support the transition of Tajikistan to a new growth model led by export and investments. The active portfolio of the World Bank in Tajikistan includes 18 regional projects with an income generation of $560 million.

The World Bank portfolio with the largest share in Tajikistan is the energy sector with 44%, then water with 16%, and finally rural and urban development with 12%. Other sectors that the World Bank support in the country include health education, social protection, governance, transport, and agriculture. Currently, the World Bank and Tajikistan discuss the strategic priorities to be jointly addressed and implemented under the new Country Partnership Framework for 2019-23. These strategic priorities aim to support the efforts of the country to transform its industrial innovations and its economy under Tajikistan’s National Development Strategy to 2030.

Tajikistan joined International Finance Corporation (IFC) in 1994. IFC is the largest global development institute under the membership of the World Bank Group. Since 1997, Tajikistan has received over $152 million investment from IFC to support regional projects in the retail, financial, manufacturing, hydropower, and tourism sectors. The IFC's advisory activities aim to promote the development of private sectors, improve the business environment, promote electronics, support agribusiness, strengthen financial sectors, involve private sectors in infrastructure development, and promote digital financial services. The investment portfolio in Tajikistan is estimated at $32 million. The current portfolio involves 37% in telecommunication and 45% in the financial market, while the rest is channeled to agribusiness, food, and retail.

World Bank has greatly invested in research to understand Tajikistan concerning its development experiences and share it with advisory and analytical services. Since 2000, over 100 publications have been produced in Tajikistan. Additionally, the advisory services of the World Bank have brought international experience to Tajikistan regarding development in the health, agricultural, education, and energy sectors.
