= Sughd Free Economic Zone =

Sughd free economic zone of industrial-innovative type
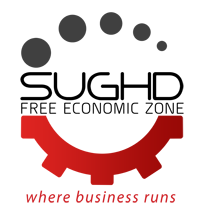
- Company type: State enterprise
- Founded: 2009
- Headquarters: Sughd region, Khujand city, Republic of Tajikistan
- Key people: Firdavs Alimov (Head of FEZ Administration)
- Number of employees: 450
- Website: http://www.fezsughd.tj

The Sughd free economic zone (Sughd FEZ) is an industrial-innovative type region established in 2009 according to the Decree of the Government of the Republic of Tajikistan passed on May 2, 2008.

Sughd FEZ is located on the Southwest Industrial Area of Khujand with a total area of 320 hectares. Geological and geodetic surveys were made in this area as well as the design work was carried out. In this part of the city there is a possibility to expand the territory of Sughd FEZ for up to 2,000 hectares of land at the expense of free space in the future.

Choosing a location Sughd FEZ was due to the presence of the industrial and communications infrastructure in this area relatively close proximity of residential areas of Khujand city, the presence of new bridge over Syr-Darya River, international highway access, and construction of a branch railway to Sughd FEZ in the future.

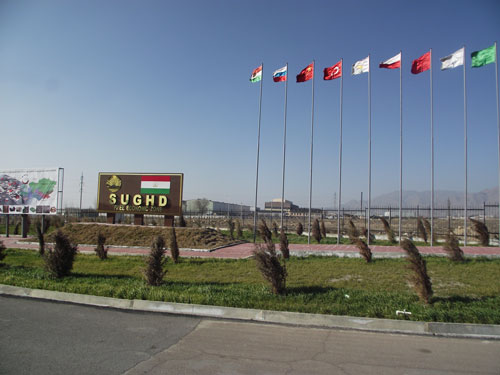

One of the most important criteria in choosing a site to start a business is the geographical location. Sughd FEZ provides with a favorable site for export-oriented enterprises. Developed transport network system of Khujand provides with a wide range of opportunities for export and trade with near- and far abroad countries.

== Transport and logistic ==
- The distance to the border with Uzbekistan is 70 km and to Kyrgyzstan - 15 km.
- New international transit highway “Dushanbe-Khujand-Chanak” runs directly near the main entrance of Sughd Free Economic Zone.
- The nearest railway station and the international airport of “Khujand” are located in a distance of 18 kilometers from Sughd FEZ.
- Nowadays the project of construction of the railway line Sughd FEZ station – “Spitamen” station with total length of 22 km is developed.

== Development timeline ==
The Decree on creation of Sughd FEZ was adopted on May 2, 2008

Regulation of free economic zone “Sughd” approved by the Parliament on 29 October 2008

The administration began operating on August 18, 2009, and a year later, on August 18, 2010, the first subjects have been registered. Since 2011 and in subsequent years, the opening ceremony of large enterprises of Sughd FEZ was held with the participation of Founder of Peace and National Unity - Leader of the Nation, President of the Republic of Tajikistan Emomali Rahmon.

== The purposes and objectives of Sughd FEZ ==
The purpose of the Sughd FEZ activity is to provide favorable conditions for local and foreign investors to implement investment projects in the field of industrial-innovative production.

The overall economic goal and objective of FEZ Sughd is to attract foreign and domestic investment capital, modern technology and managerial expertise in order to reduce production costs, maximize the use of free labor and natural resources, and stimulate the growth of Tajikistan's economic potential.

Sughd FEZ is also meant to involve the economy of Sughd and Tajikistan into the international division of labor, to develop trade with foreign countries and to stimulate the production of competitive goods for the domestic and foreign markets.

The social objective of Sughd FEZ is new job formation and improvement of the living standards and purchasing power of the population in order to ensure a sustainable development of the region.

The following is also expected on the territory of Sughd FEZ: creation of a modern engineering, transport, telecommunications and industrial infrastructure that conforms to international standards, introduction of domestic scientific and technological designs and inventions, as well as establishment of an environmentally-friendly network of industries that protect the environment.

== Advantages of Sughd FEZ ==
The tax and customs preferences, which are provided to the FEZ subjects, are the other attractive investment factor in addition to geographical location.

Entrepreneurship activity of subjects on FEZ territory regardless the type of ownership is exempt from 8 of 10 kinds of taxes provided in the Tax code of Tajikistan.

FEZ subjects are the tax agents in withholding and payment of social tax (25% from payroll budget) and income tax (from 8 to 13%) for the employees of FEZ subjects, that are taxpayers.

Profit received by the foreign investors and salary of foreign employees given in foreign currency can be transferred without difficulties to abroad and while transferring will not be not taxed.

Sughd FEZ is a part of the customs territory of the Republic of Tajikistan. Goods placed on Sughd FEZ territory are considered as being outside the customs territory of the Republic of Tajikistan makes it possible to import goods without customs duty and VAT payment.

Import into the territory of the free economic zone of foreign and domestic goods shall be carried out without collection of customs duties and taxes.

Export from the territory of the free economic zone of the goods outside of the Republic of Tajikistan shall not be subject to taxes and customs duties, except for the fees for customs clearance, and the bans and the restrictions of economic nature shall not apply.

== FEZ subjects ==
The status of subject can obtain both Tajik and foreign companies, which are engaged in the industrial-innovative manufacture of products, export-import activities or rendering different types of services. The minimum investment for production activities is 500 thousand US dollars, for export-import operations - 50 thousand US dollars, for rendering services - 10 thousand US dollars.

The priority kind of activity in Sughd FEZ is an activity which is not presented on the territory of the Republic of Tajikistan or less known.

As at 1 November 2016, 26 companies in total have been registered as subjects. The operating subjects are involved in the production of electrical cables, plastic pipes, aluminum and PVC profiles, construction materials, paint and varnishes, plastic packages, assembly and installation of solar collectors and subsurface pumps, recycling of metals. It is planned to launch enterprises for the production of natural juices and nectars, energy saving lamps, furniture and others.

== Modernization and Capacity Building ==
The Sughd Free Economic Zone (FEZ) has entered into a two-year strategic agreement with Leansolutions.company aimed at strengthening the zone's institutional and operational capacity on 13 January 2026. The project focuses on the modernization of the FEZ through the digitalization of services, including the implementation of a "single window" system, Customer Relationship Management (CRM) tools, and online platforms for residents.

Key objectives of the initiative include the integration of green economy and Environmental, Social, and Governance (ESG) principles, as well as the alignment of the zone's activities with national industrialization and export policies. The program also establishes training and acceleration initiatives for entrepreneurs, women, and youth, alongside the development of new mechanisms for investment attraction and transparent monitoring systems (MEL).
