= Agroinvestbank =

Bank in Tajikistan

- Type: Private/Cooperative
- Industry: Banking
- Founded: 1992
- Defunct: May 21, 2021
- Headquarters: Dushanbe, Tajikistan
- Website: www.agroinvestbank.tj

OJSC Agroinvestbank (Tajik: ҶСК “Агроинвестбонк”) was the second-largest commercial bank in Tajikistan. The bank had been led by chairman Murodali Alimardon since April 1, 2015, who was the former deputy prime minister of Tajikistan. It was initially known as the Tajik Agroindustrial Bank, and then as Shark up until 2002. It was liquidated in 2021.

The bank has faced allegations in the past of being corrupt, for example with allegations that the employees of the bank helped a person borrow huge amounts of money, even though his companies were liquidated.

== History ==
After the end of the Tajikistani Civil War, the Tajik government which was in debt entered a sovereign debt agreement where they channeled their loans to the Agroinvestbank for cotton purveyor Paul Reinhart of Credit Suisse First Boston. Thus, the bank became heavily invested in cotton production. In the early 2000s, the bank's loan portfolio mostly consisted of cotton producers, which were 90% of the portfolio and 11% of their total GDP. However, due to falling cotton costs, the government pressured the bank into splitting in two. The first of these is with Kreditinvest, an asset management company, which garnered the liabilities and the second was Agroinvestbank which was the commercial bank.

In 2009, the European Bank for Reconstruction and Development acquired a 25% stake in the company with 1 share for $12 million. Amid a banking crisis in December 2016, the bank was bailed out by the government along with others for $490 million to avoid bankruptcy.

On May 21, 2021, the license of the bank was revoked by the National Bank of Tajikistan following its liquidation.
