= Tajik Aluminium Company =

Enterprise in Tajikistan

Coordinates: 38.5485°N 68.2278°E

- Native name: Ширкати Алюминийи Тоҷик
- Industry: Aluminium manufacturing
- Headquarters: Tursunzoda, Tajikistan
- Website: http://www.talco.com.tj/en/

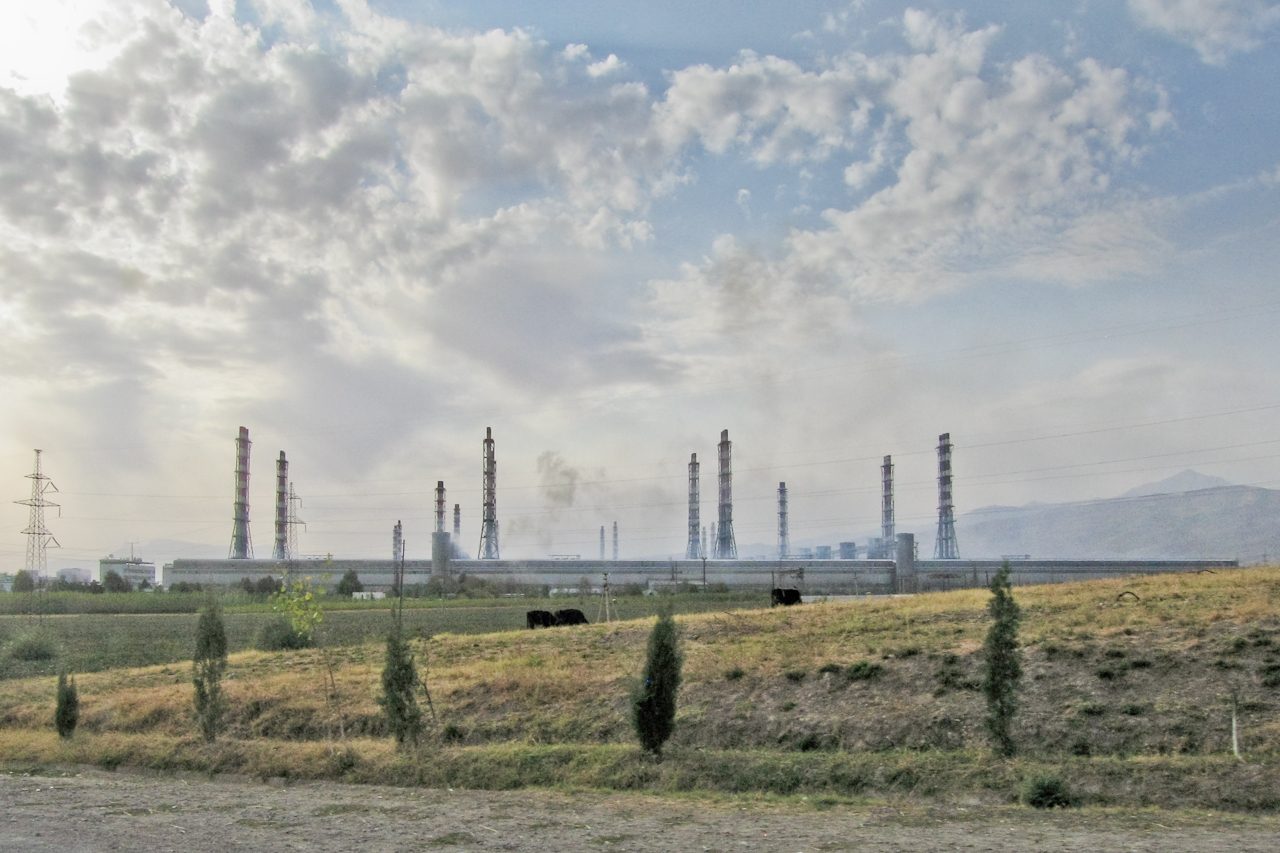
The TALCO plant in Tursunzoda

The Tajik Aluminium Company (Tajik: Ширкати Алюминийи Тоҷик, romanized: Shirkati Alyuminiyi Tojik; Russian: Таджикская алюминиевая компания), abbreviated as TALCO (Tajik/Russian: ТАЛКО) headquartered in Tursunzoda, Tajikistan, runs the largest aluminium manufacturing plant in Central Asia, and is Tajikistan's chief industrial asset.

The President of Tajikistan, Emomali Rahmon, personally oversees TALCO and according to The Economist, "Each year, TALCO produces hundreds of millions of dollars in profits that are routed to a shell company in the British Virgin Islands". According to a leaked cable written by the US ambassador in Tajikistan, this shell company is controlled by Rahmon.

Tajikistan has no native aluminium ore, so the raw material for the plant must be imported. Construction of the plant proper began in 1972, and the first pouring of aluminium took place on 31 March 1975.

Tajik news agency AVESTA reported that the plant produced a total of 416,000 tonnes (409,000 long tons; 459,000 short tons) of aluminium in 2006. In 2012, TALCO is sticking to its plan to produce 332,500 tonnes of primary aluminium, which would restore production approximately to 2010 levels after a 20% decline to 277,584 tonnes in 2011. In 2024 TALCO produced 82,225 tonnes.

TALCO consumes roughly 40% of the country's electrical power, and a 2002 study found it responsible for notable fluorine water pollution in the region.
